= List of English Schools Foundation schools =

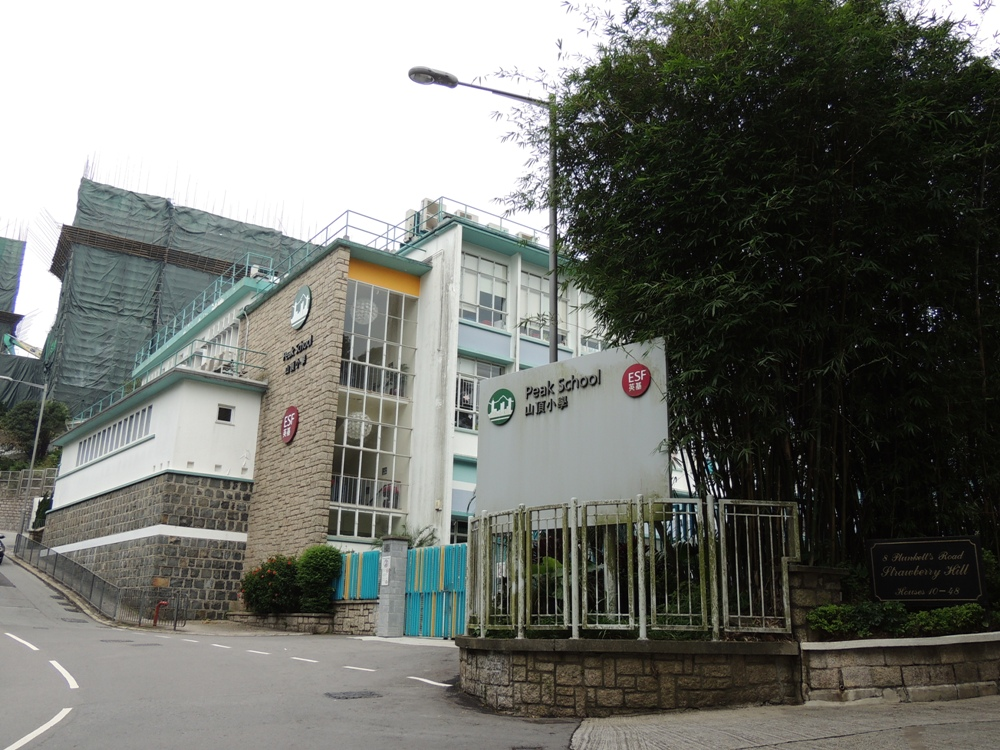
Peak School is a coeducational preparatory school, located at Plunkett's Road on Victoria Peak

The English Schools Foundation (ESF) manages 22 schools in Hong Kong: five secondary schools, nine primary schools, two "all through" schools, five kindergartens and one school for children with special needs.

== Kindergartens ==
- Abacus International Kindergarten
- Hillside International Kindergarten
- Tsing Yi Kindergarten
- Tung Chung Kindergarten
- Wu Kai Sha Kindergarten

== Primary schools ==
- Beacon Hill School
- Bradbury School
- Clearwater Bay School
- Glenealy School
- Kennedy School
- Kowloon Junior School
- Peak School
- Quarry Bay School
- Sha Tin Junior School

== Secondary schools ==
- Island School
- King George V School
- Sha Tin College
- South Island School
- West Island School

== All through schools ==
Note: these schools are run as private independent schools with no subvention from the Hong Kong Government.

- Discovery College
- Renaissance College

== Special needs schools ==
- Jockey Club Sarah Roe School
