= South Island School =

International school in Hong Kong

Coordinates: 22.2539°N 114.1831°E

- 50 Nam Fung Road; Aberdeen, Hong Kong

Information
- Type: Private, comprehensive, international, Secondary, co-educational.
- Motto: Making a Difference
- Established: 1977
- Principal: Ms. Helen Thew
- Enrollment: approx. 1,400
- Language: English
- Houses: Bahay, Casa, Shtepi, Namas, Kuca, Maison
- Colours: Green, white and blue
- Mascot: Stingray
- Year: 7 - 13
- Website: http://www.sis.edu.hk/

South Island School
- Traditional Chinese: 南島中學
- Simplified Chinese: 南岛中学
Transcriptions
Standard Mandarin
- Hanyu Pinyin: Nán Dǎo Zhōngxué
Yue: Cantonese
- Yale Romanization: Nàahm dóu jūng hohk
- Jyutping: Naam4 dou2 zung1 hok6

South Island School is a private international school founded by the English Schools Foundation of Hong Kong, located at 50 Nam Fung Road, Aberdeen, Hong Kong, with about 1,400 students enrolled and 107 teachers. Students come from diverse backgrounds, with over 38 nationalities represented.

The school offers the GCSE/IGCSE syllabus, IB Diploma Programme, IB Career-related Programme and the BTEC qualification.

The school is one of three ESF secondary schools on Hong Kong Island, the others being West Island School and Island School.

== History ==
In 1977, South Island School was founded as an annex of Island School, a fellow English Schools Foundation School. Mike Taylor was the first principal.

The school moved to its current location at 50 Nam Fung Road in 1983. It consisted of the Ching Ling Soong Block and an outdoor swimming pool.

As the school grew in size, more facilities were required. The next big change to the school came with the construction of the Stephen Hawking Building (named after physicist Stephen Hawking), and the swimming pool became an indoor one with the Sports Block being built on top of it, allowing for year-round swimming lessons. In 2004, another new block was completed called the Da Vinci Block.

In the school year of 2007–2008, the school was accredited to teach the IB Diploma programme. The IB Centre was opened, a section of the school designated for International Baccalaureate students in Years 12 and 13. This was renamed the Diploma Centre in the school year of 2009–2010.

In November 2010, the new John Wray Atrium, named after previous principal, John Wray, opened for all students.

In the following years, many of the school facilities underwent renovations. The library in the C Block was renovated in the summer holidays of 2012 and re-opened in late September the same year, and was renamed as the "Learning Resource Center". In November 2012, the renovation of the library was completed and was reopened as the Learning Resources Centre (LRC).

In February 2014, additional floors were added to the Sports Block to create The Space, a multipurpose learning space. There was also an astroturf on top of the Space which was completed in the same year. In November, the school completed a redesigned School Hall with state-of-the-art facilities and a 400-seat auditorium.

In 2016, South Island School adopted the Middle Years Program and the IBCP (career-related) programme. The IBCP was offered in addition to the IB Diploma programme, which places a greater emphasis on developing vocational skills. The programme combines academic courses from the IB Diploma programme with the career-related experiences of the BTEC courses to create a personalised and career-focused pathway for students. Also in the same year, the School Foyer and the Refectory were renovated.

In 2017, South Island School celebrated its 40th anniversary. Students and staff walked down to Deep Water Bay Beach for charity and participated in activities commemorating the event, such as a time capsule and an art mural. A birthday cake was also made, with enough cake for every teacher and student in the school. Later that October, an exhibition was shown in the Atrium commemorating the school's history, and an alumni gathering was held in Hong Kong.

== Academics ==
=== Curriculum ===
Between Year 7 and Year 9, students take the Middle Years Programme (MYP) offered by the International Baccalaureate. The MYP is usually a 5-year programme, but the programme was shortened to 3 years so that the IGCSE programme could still be offered. During Year 7 and 8, all students follow a common curriculum, which includes English, Maths, Science, Chinese, a modern foreign language (French or Spanish), Individuals and Societies, Global Thinking, design, and the arts. At the end of Year 9, all students participate in the Community Project. Students work in groups to investigate, propose, plan and implement a project that serves a need within the school community or the wider Hong Kong community.

During Year 10 and 11, students follow the IGCSE curriculum. All students must take English, Mathematics, Sciences (Biology, Chemistry, Physics), PE (examined or non-examined), a language, a humanities subject, an arts subject, and Global Citizenship. In addition, students can choose to take either another language, or another humanities subject.

In Year 12 and 13, students can either choose to do the IB Diploma or the IB Career-related Programme. For the Diploma Programme, students must choose 3 Higher Level subjects and 3 Standard Level subjects, where subjects in the student's first language, additional language, the humanities, the sciences, and mathematics are required. Students also need to complete the Extended Essay, CAS, and the Theory of Knowledge course. Students in the Career-related Programme can choose to substitute some of their IBDP subjects with more applied BTEC subjects, but must still complete the CP core.

=== Higher education ===
South Island School

In 2019, 40% of South Island School students matriculated to the United Kingdom, 19% to Hong Kong, 13% to the United States, 9% to Canada, 6% to either Australia or New Zealand, and the remainder matriculated to countries such as Korea and Japan. In Hong Kong, 17 students chose to study at the University of Hong Kong, five at HKUST and six at the Chinese University of Hong Kong, while in the UK, 6 students matriculated to Imperial College and UCL. In addition, the most popular universities in Canada were the University of British Columbia and the University of Toronto with five students each.

South Island School graduates usually apply to a range of courses. Fields such as Economics, and Business and Management have been consistently popular among South Island School graduates. Ten students each have matriculated to the traditionally popular Law and Psychology courses. The social sciences remain popular: a particular favourite is Psychology, with 11 students choosing this as their major. 20 students pursued creative degrees such as Design, Film and Performing Arts as well.

=== Examinations ===
In South Island School, students take a selection of IGCSE, GCSE, IBDP or IBCP examinations.

In 2022, for IGCSE/GCSE, 61% of students achieved an A*-A grades. 94% of all grades were A*-C.

For IB, 98% of students passed and the cohort achieved an average Diploma score of 37.1 points, 4.1 points above the world average. Three DP students achieved the maximum 45 points. Almost 40% of the cohort achieved 40 points or more – another truly remarkable result.

== Student backgrounds ==
Students come from diverse backgrounds, with 38 nationalities represented as of 2019. In 2019, the most represented nationality was the United Kingdom. As of that year, 50% of the students were ethnic Chinese, 14% were Caucasian, 8% were Eurasian, 7% were Indian, and 21% were of other races.

== Student inclusion ==
The school is non-selective towards academic ability. It reserves 24 places in the Learning Support Unit for students with additional learning needs. Each individual needs student has their own Individual Education Plan (IEP) and an Individual Needs teacher who is responsible for coordinating with teachers, tutors and parents. The school has a specialised curriculum that provides for the student's social, emotional, and physical needs with an opportunity to gain qualifications.

Students with English as an additional language (EAL) are assessed when joining the school and placed in small-group, intensive English classes which aim to boost reading and writing skills. In the senior years, there is a focus on academic English for the IGCSE and the IB Diploma programme. Students have the opportunity to self-study their native language during the IB Diploma programme with school support.

== Student leadership ==
=== Prefect Team ===
The school has a prefect system in which the Year 12 and Year 13 students are assigned positions of responsibility to help with the day-to-day operations of the school. Serving as chief representatives of the student body is the Head Prefect team, led by the Head Boy and Head Girl.

=== Student Council ===
The Student Council is led by two Year 13 heads and consists of representatives ranging from Year 9 to 13. The council is split up into six House Councils, which are led by select Year 12 heads who are also part of their House Leadership Team. The Council provides the main body for student discussion and represents the student voice in some developmental decisions.

=== Sustainability Council ===
The Sustainability Council, or SusCo in short, are a student group that promotes environmental awareness in South Island School. Aside from installing water fountains and recycling bins around the school, they have installed solar panels on the roof of the D Block.

=== Making a Difference Council ===
The MaD Council are a student group that promotes the school's philosophy of 'Making A Difference'. They are responsible for organising and making decisions for MaD Week, a week where students go overseas or stay in Hong Kong to make a difference to themselves and the community around them. In addition, they work with the house councils to organise school events and initiatives, such as each house's MaD Week, as well as other student-led events.

=== Digital Leadership Council ===
The Digital Leadership Council (formally the Digital Literacy Council, or DLC for short) is a student group involved in organising technology-related initiatives at South Island School. They have worked with Year 8 students, supporting them in the media literacy unit, and have supported the School Laptop Induction evenings for new incoming Year 7s. They have also organised a photography club and coding a club, as well as an annual 'Internet Safety Week'. The Digital Leaders have also collaborated with Quarry Bay School and Bradbury School to advocate digital literacy and safety for primary students. The Tech Bubble, a podcast about technology, was launched in 2020.

== Sports and activities ==
Extra-curricular activities at the school include debating, MUN, squash, netball, basketball, football, swimming, chess, tennis, singing, rugby, field hockey, cricket and more. Student take part in inter-house activities in year group competitions, athletics, swimming, music and dance competitions, and more.

South Island School competes in various inter-school competitions including: basketball, badminton, sailing, golf, netball, football, rugby, table tennis, bowling, swimming, athletics, cross country, and volleyball. There are also musical activities culminating in a range of performances throughout the year.

In 2019, South Island School beat Island School to win the All Hong Kong Schools Jing Ying Football Tournament. This was the first time that the school has won.

The school aims to make a difference to the local and global community by organising an annual 'Making a Difference' (MaD) week, where students undertake service and action projects both within Hong Kong and overseas. Students also can participate in the Hong Kong Award for Young People program (HKAYP), as well as engage in various student-led events, such as Nightfest, International Evening, the Innovation Fashion Show, Diwali Night, the ICM yearly fundraiser, SIS Chef etc. Each house has a Making a Difference council, along with a whole-school MaD council that plans and implements these events.

== Campus and Facilities ==
The school's campus is in the south side of Hong Kong Island against the backdrop of Mount Nicholson, facing the South China Sea. It is in a semi-rural location. Students have their own locker and form room. For Years 12 to 13, there is a dedicated study facility and common room space.

South Island School's facilities include multi-purpose facilities such as The Space, The John Wray Atrium which includes a cafeteria, and the Hall. Learning facilities include the Diploma Centre, science laboratories, food technology workshop rooms, design technology workshop rooms, 2 drama studios, art rooms, music and 3 Media Studies rooms. In addition, the school has sports facilities such as a 25-metre indoor swimming pool, a Sports Hall with a climbing wall, an artificial Astro Turf, 2 outdoor playgrounds as well as a covered playgrond. There are three catering facilities within the school: the Refectory, the Atrium, and a café called Cafe Five O.

The school's Learning Resources Centre, a library, has a wide variety of resources ranging from print materials to online resources. Workshops and tutorials are provided to all students, such as a bi-weekly lesson for Year 7. The annual Readathon event is also a sponsorship event to support Orbis International, a non-governmental organisation that aims to raise awareness of eye disease in developing countries.

== Governance ==
South Island School is part of the English Schools Foundation of 22 schools in Hong Kong that operates within the ESF government ordinance.

The school is accountable to the Board of Governors (executive committee) of the English Schools Foundation and its local governing body, the School Council. The council meets around six times per year. It has two sub-committees, namely Finance & Personnel (FP) and Learning and Professional Development (LPD) both chaired by community representatives. Among other matters, the FP sub-committee reviews the school's annual budget and recommends acceptance to the full council. It also reviews personnel matters and considers health & safety issues. The LPD subcommittee's work is aimed at among other things, curriculum development, teaching methods and examination performance.

== Notable alumni ==
- Joey Wong, singer, actress

== See also ==
- English Schools Foundation
- List of English Schools Foundation schools
- List of international schools in Hong Kong
