= BOCHK Bauhinia Bowl =

The Bank of China (Hong Kong) Bauhinia Bowl Award (中銀香港紫荊盃) is an annual award given by the Hong Kong Schools Sports Federation to member secondary schools of the Hong Kong Island and Kowloon Secondary Schools Regional Committee (HKSSRC). The award was established to encourage participation in inter-school sports competitions organised by the Regional Committee. In the 2018–19 season, 265 secondary schools with over 6,000 teams and 44,000 students participated in the 17 sporting competitions organised by the Regional Committee.

The BOCHK Bauhinia Bowl Award is sponsored by Bank of China (Hong Kong) Limited, previously by Omega. The trophy was previously known as the Omega Rose Bowl which dated back to 1965, but has been known as the BOCHK Bauhinia Bowl since the 2002–03 season.

== Type of schools ==
The BOCHK Bauhinia Bowl Awards are awarded separately to boys' schools, girls' schools, and co-educational schools. They are divided into two sections.

The BOCHK Bauhinia Bowl trophies are awarded to schools achieving the best all-round performance from all sporting events organised by the Regional Committee during the year. A total of 10 trophies will be awarded each year: Champion, Second place, and Most Progressed for girls' and boys' schools, and the same with an extra third-place trophy for co-educational schools.

The BOCHK Bauhinia Bowl Sportsboy/Sportsgirl of the Year statuette trophies are awarded to individuals who have contributed greatly to school sport in general and shown outstanding sporting ability during the year, with consideration given to sporting behaviour, character, and commitment to sport. Trophies are given to the Sportsboy and Sportsgirl of the year from single-sex boys' and girls' schools, and from co-ed schools. Scholarships are awarded by Bank of China (Hong Kong).

In case of doubt in classifying a member school to one of the above categories because of a special situation, the Regional Committee makes the final decision on classification. However, schools concerned are welcomed to express their views to the Regional Committee either by letter or presence at a Committee Meeting for this purpose.

== The award ==
The award is divided into two sections:

=== Section One – BOCHK Bauhinia Bowl ===
Trophies will be awarded to schools achieving the best all-round performance from all sporting events organised by the Regional Committee each year. A total of 10 trophies will be awarded each year.

The trophies are all follows:-

1. BOCHK Bauhinia Bowl (Champion) – Boys Schools
2. BOCHK Bauhinia Bowl (Second) – Boys Schools
3. BOCHK Bauhinia Bowl The Most Progressive Boys School – Boys Schools
4. BOCHK Bauhinia Bowl (Champion) – Girls Schools
5. BOCHK Bauhinia Bowl (Second) – Girls Schools
6. BOCHK Bauhinia Bowl The Most Progressive Girls School – Girls Schools
7. BOCHK Bauhinia Bowl (Champion) – Co-educational Schools
8. BOCHK Bauhinia Bowl (Second) – Co-educational Schools
9. BOCHK Bauhinia Bowl (Third) – Co-educational Schools
10. BOCHK Bauhinia Bowl The Most Progressive Co-educational School – Co-educational Schools

In addition to the above awards, the following trophies will also be awarded commencing 2006 – 2007 season

1. BOCHK Bauhinia Bowl (Third) – Boys' Schools
2. BOCHK Bauhinia Bowl (Third) – Girls Schools
3. BOCHK Bauhinia Bowl (Fourth) – Co-educational Schools
4. BOCHK Bauhinia Bowl (Fifth) – Co-educational Schools
5. BOCHK Bauhinia Bowl (Sixth) – Co-educational Schools
6. BOCHK Bauhinia Bowl (Seventh) – Co-educational Schools
7. BOCHK Bauhinia Bowl (Eighth) – Co-educational Schools

And the following trophies will be awarded commencing 2024 – 2025 season

1. BOCHK Bauhinia Bowl The Progressive Boys School (Second) – Boys Schools
2. BOCHK Bauhinia Bowl The Progressive Boys School (Third) – Boys Schools
3. BOCHK Bauhinia Bowl The Progressive Girls School (Second) – Girls Schools
4. BOCHK Bauhinia Bowl The Progressive Girls School (Third) – Girls Schools
5. BOCHK Bauhinia Bowl The Progressive Co-educational School (Second) – Co-educational Schools
6. BOCHK Bauhinia Bowl The Progressive Co-educational School (Third) – Co-educational Schools

=== Section Two – BOCHK Bauhinia Bowl Sportsboy/Sportsgirl of the Year ===
These statuette trophies are awarded to the individual who has contributed greatly to his or her schools' sports in general and has shown outstanding ability in the field of sport during the year. In addition to good all-round achievement in sports, the candidate for the trophy must show a high standard of sportsmanship on and off the field. The candidate must have shown a willingness to help others, some kind of organising capacity, a sense of fair play and must be genuinely interested in furthering the spirit of competition and esprit-de-corps between member schools and Hong Kong Sports in general. Bank of China (Hong Kong) Limited has very generously offered a scholarship to each Sportsboy/Sportsgirl of the Year. The trophies for Sportsboy/Sportsgirl of the Year are as follows:

1. Sportsboy of the Year – Boys Schools
2. Sportsgirl of the Year – Girls Schools
3. Sportsboy of the Year – Co-educational Schools
4. Sportsgirl of the Year – Co-educational Schools

=== Teaming and scoring system ===
The Teaming and Scoring System is at the official home page of the Hong Kong Schools Sports Federation.

== Honour roll ==
=== Boys' Schools ===
Season	Champion	Second	Third	Most Progressive	Progressive (Second)	Progressive (Third)
2024–2025	Diocesan Boys' School	La Salle College	Ying Wa College	Choi Hung Estate Catholic Secondary School	-	-
2023–2024	Diocesan Boys' School	La Salle College	Ying Wa College	Ying Wa College	-	-
2022–2023	-	-	-	-	-	-
2021–2022	-	-	-	-	-	-
2020–2021	-	-	-	-	-	-
2019–2020	-	-	-	-	-	-
2018–2019	Diocesan Boys' School	La Salle College	Ying Wa College	St. Paul's College	-	-
2017–2018	Diocesan Boys' School	La Salle College	Ying Wa College	Cheung Sha Wan Catholic Secondary School	-	-
2016–2017	Diocesan Boys' School	La Salle College	Ying Wa College	Wah Yan College, Kowloon	-	-
2015–2016	Diocesan Boys' School	La Salle College	Ying Wa College	Wah Yan College, Kowloon	-	-
2014–2015	Diocesan Boys' School	La Salle College	Ying Wa College	Wah Yan College, Kowloon	-	-
2013–2014	Diocesan Boys' School	La Salle College	Ying Wa College	Chong Gene Hang College	-	-
2012–2013	Diocesan Boys' School	La Salle College	Ying Wa College	Wah Yan College, Hong Kong	-	-
2011–2012	Diocesan Boys' School	La Salle College	Ying Wa College	St. Joseph's College	-	-
2010–2011	Diocesan Boys' School	La Salle College	Ying Wa College	Wah Yan College, Hong Kong	-	-
2009–2010	Diocesan Boys' School	La Salle College	Ying Wa College	St. Paul's College	-	-
2008–2009	Diocesan Boys' School	La Salle College	Ying Wa College	Ng Wah Catholic Secondary School	-	-
2007–2008	Diocesan Boys' School	La Salle College	Ying Wa College	Sing Yin Secondary School	-	-
2006–2007	La Salle College	Diocesan Boys' School	Ying Wa College	Cheung Sha Wan Catholic Secondary School	-	-
2005–2006	La Salle College	Diocesan Boys' School	-	St. Joseph's College	-	-
2004–2005	La Salle College	Diocesan Boys' School	-	Chan Sui Ki (La Salle) College	-	-
2003–2004	La Salle College	Diocesan Boys' School	-	Salesian English School	-	-
2002–2003	La Salle College	Diocesan Boys' School	-	Ying Wa College	-	-
2001–2002	La Salle College	Diocesan Boys' School	-	Kwun Tong Maryknoll College	-	-
2000–2001	La Salle College	Diocesan Boys' School	-	Ying Wa College	-	-
1999–2000	La Salle College	Diocesan Boys' School	-	Queen's College	-	-
1998–1999	Diocesan Boys' School	La Salle College	-	St. Paul's College	-	-
1997–1998	Diocesan Boys' School	La Salle College	-	Chong Gene Hang College	-	-
1996–1997	Diocesan Boys' School	La Salle College	-	King's College	-	-
1995–1996	Diocesan Boys' School	La Salle College	-	Wah Yan College, Kowloon	-	-
1994–1995	Diocesan Boys' School	La Salle College	-	Cheung Sha Wan Catholic Secondary School	-	-
1993–1994	La Salle College	Diocesan Boys' School	-	Wah Yan College, Hong Kong	-	-
1992–1993	Diocesan Boys' School	La Salle College	-	Chong Gene Hang College	-	-
1991–1992	Diocesan Boys' School	La Salle College	-	Ying Wa College	-	-
1990–1991	La Salle College	Diocesan Boys' School	-	Wah Yan College, Hong Kong	-	-
1989–1990	La Salle College	Diocesan Boys' School	-	Chan Sui Ki (La Salle) College	-	-
1988–1989	La Salle College	Diocesan Boys' School	-	Kowloon Technical School	-	-
1987–1988	La Salle College	Diocesan Boys' School	-	King's College	-	-
1986–1987	La Salle College	Diocesan Boys' School	-	St. Joseph's College	-	-
1985–1986	La Salle College	Diocesan Boys' School	-	-	-	-
1984–1985	La Salle College	Diocesan Boys' School	-	Chong Gene Hang College	-	-
1983–1984	La Salle College	Wah Yan College, Hong Kong	-	St. Bonaventure College	-	-
1982–1983	La Salle College	Diocesan Boys' School	-	Queen's College	-	-
1981–1982	La Salle College	Diocesan Boys' School	-	Po Chiu College	-	-
1980–1981	La Salle College	Chan Sui Ki (La Salle) College	-	Chan Sui Ki (La Salle) College	-	-
1979–1980	La Salle College	Diocesan Boys' School	-	St. Joseph's College	-	-
1978–1979	La Salle College	Diocesan Boys' School	-	Wah Yan College, Hong Kong	-	-
1977–1978	La Salle College	Diocesan Boys' School	-	Chong Gene Hang College	-	-
1976–1977	La Salle College	Diocesan Boys' School	-	Ng Wah College	-	-
1975–1976	La Salle College	Diocesan Boys' School	-	Cheung Sha Wan Catholic Secondary School	-	-
1974–1975	La Salle College	Diocesan Boys' School	-	St. Joseph's College	-	-
1973–1974	Diocesan Boys' School	La Salle College	-	Chan Sui Ki (La Salle) College	-	-
1972–1973	Diocesan Boys' School	La Salle College	-	Wah Yan College, Hong Kong	-	-
1971–1972	Diocesan Boys' School	Ying Wa College	-	King's College	-	-
1970–1971	Ying Wa College	Diocesan Boys' School	-	Queen's College	-	-
1969–1970	Diocesan Boys' School	La Salle College	-	St. Paul's College	-	-
1968–1969	Diocesan Boys' School	La Salle College	-	Ying Wa College	-	-
1967–1968	Diocesan Boys' School	La Salle College	-	-	-	-
1966–1967	Diocesan Boys' School	-	-	-	-	-
1965–1966	Diocesan Boys' School	-	-	-	-	-

=== Girls' Schools ===
Season	Champion	Second	Third	Most Progressive	Progressive (Second)	Progressive (Third)
2024–2025	Heep Yunn School	Diocesan Girls' School	Good Hope School	Good Hope School	Pooi To Middle School	True Light Girls' College
2023–2024	Heep Yunn School	Diocesan Girls' School	Good Hope School	Good Hope School	-	-
2022–2023	-	-	-	-	-	-
2021–2022	-	-	-	-	-	-
2020–2021	-	-	-	-	-	-
2019–2020	-	-	-	-	-	-
2018–2019	Heep Yunn School	Diocesan Girls' School	Good Hope School	Sacred Heart Canossian College	-	-
2017–2018	Heep Yunn School	Diocesan Girls' School	Good Hope School	True Light Middle School of Hong Kong	-	-
2016–2017	Heep Yunn School	Diocesan Girls' School	Good Hope School	Marymount Secondary School	-	-
2015–2016	Heep Yunn School	Diocesan Girls' School	Good Hope School	St. Stephen's Girls' College	-	-
2014–2015	Heep Yunn School	Diocesan Girls' School	Good Hope School	Ying Wa Girls' School	-	-
2013–2014	Heep Yunn School	Diocesan Girls' School	Good Hope School	St. Paul's School (Lam Tin)	-	-
2012–2013	Heep Yunn School	Diocesan Girls' School	Good Hope School	St. Stephen's Girls' College	-	-
2011–2012	Heep Yunn School	Diocesan Girls' School	Sacred Heart Canossian College	Hotung Secondary School	-	-
2010–2011	Heep Yunn School	Diocesan Girls' School	Sacred Heart Canossian College	St. Clare's Girls' School	-	-
2009–2010	Heep Yunn School	Diocesan Girls' School	Sacred Heart Canossian College	St. Paul's Convent School	-	-
2008–2009	Heep Yunn School	Diocesan Girls' School	Sacred Heart Canossian College	Kit Sam Lam Bing Yim Secondary School	-	-
2007–2008	Heep Yunn School	Diocesan Girls' School	Sacred Heart Canossian College	Good Hope School	-	-
2006–2007	Heep Yunn School	Diocesan Girls' School	Sacred Heart Canossian College	Sacred Heart Canossian College	-	-
2005–2006	Heep Yunn School	Diocesan Girls' School	-	St. Paul's Convent School	-	-
2004–2005	Heep Yunn School	Diocesan Girls' School	-	Sacred Heart Canossian College	-	-
2003–2004	Heep Yunn School	Diocesan Girls' School	-	St. Stephen's Girls' College	-	-
2002–2003	Heep Yunn School	Diocesan Girls' School	-	Holy Trinity College	-	-
2001–2002	Heep Yunn School	Diocesan Girls' School	-	St. Mary's Canossian College	-	-
2000–2001	Heep Yunn School	Diocesan Girls' School	-	Sacred Heart Canossian College	-	-
1999–2000	Heep Yunn School	Diocesan Girls' School	-	Hong Kong True Light College	-	-
1998–1999	Heep Yunn School	Diocesan Girls' School	-	St. Catharine's School for Girls, Kwun Tong	-	-
1997–1998	Heep Yunn School	Diocesan Girls' School	-	St. Catharine's School for Girls, Kwun Tong	-	-
1996–1997	Heep Yunn School	Diocesan Girls' School	-	Ho Tung Technical School for Girls	-	-
1995–1996	Heep Yunn School	Diocesan Girls' School	-	Maryknoll Convent School	-	-
1994–1995	Heep Yunn School	Diocesan Girls' School	-	Belilios Public School	-	-
1993–1994	Heep Yunn School	Diocesan Girls' School	-	Belilios Public School	-	-
1992–1993	Heep Yunn School	Diocesan Girls' School	-	Marymount Secondary School	-	-
1991–1992	Heep Yunn School	Diocesan Girls' School	-	Belilios Public School	-	-
1990–1991	Heep Yunn School	Diocesan Girls' School	-	St. Antonius Girls' College	-	-
1989–1990	Heep Yunn School	Diocesan Girls' School	-	-	-	-
1988–1989	Heep Yunn School	Diocesan Girls' School	-	Good Hope School	-	-
1987–1988	Heep Yunn School	Diocesan Girls' School	-	Holy Trinity College	-	-
1986–1987	Heep Yunn School	Diocesan Girls' School	-	St. Clare's Girls' School	-	-
1985–1986	Heep Yunn School	Diocesan Girls' School	-	Heep Yunn School	-	-
1984–1985	Diocesan Girls' School; Heep Yunn School	-	-	-	-	-
1983–1984	Diocesan Girls' School	Ying Wa Girls' School	-	-	-	-
1982–1983	Diocesan Girls' School	St. Antonius Girls' College	-	-	-	-
1981–1982	Diocesan Girls' School	Maryknoll Convent School	-	St. Catharine's School for Girls, Kwun Tong	-	-
1980–1981	Diocesan Girls' School	Maryknoll Convent School	-	Belilios Public School	-	-
1979–1980	Maryknoll Convent School	Diocesan Girls' School	-	Heep Yunn School	-	-
1978–1979	Diocesan Girls' School	Maryknoll Convent School	-	St. Margaret's Girls' College	-	-
1977–1978	Diocesan Girls' School	Maryknoll Convent School; St. Antonius Girls' College	-	Ying Wa Girls' School	-	-
1976–1977	Diocesan Girls' School	Maryknoll Convent School	-	St. Margaret's Girls' College	-	-
1975–1976	Maryknoll Convent School	Diocesan Girls' School	-	St. Paul's Convent School	-	-
1974–1975	Diocesan Girls' School	Maryknoll Convent School	-	Maryknoll Convent School	-	-
1973–1974	Maryknoll Convent School	Diocesan Girls' School	-	-	-	-
1972–1973	Diocesan Girls' School	Maryknoll Convent School	-	Maryknoll Convent School	-	-
1971–1972	Diocesan Girls' School	Maryknoll Convent School	-	Belilios Public School	-	-
1970–1971	Diocesan Girls' School	Maryknoll Convent School	-	-	-	-
1969–1970	Diocesan Girls' School	Maryknoll Convent School	-	St. Mary's Canossian College	-	-
1968–1969	Diocesan Girls' School	Maryknoll Convent School	-	Maryknoll Convent School	-	-
1967–1968	Diocesan Girls' School	St. Paul's Convent School	-	-	-	-
1966–1967	Diocesan Girls' School	-	-	-	-	-
1965–1966	Diocesan Girls' School	-	-	-	-	-

=== Co-educational Schools ===
Season	Champion	Second	Third	Fourth	Fifth	Sixth	Seventh	Eighth	Most Progressive	Progressive (Second)	Progressive (Third)
2024–2025	Pui Ching Middle School	Fukien Secondary School (Kwun Tong)	Hong Kong University Graduates Association College	St. Paul's Co-educational College	West Island School	South Island School	St. Margaret's Co-educational English Secondary and Primary School	St. Stephen's College	The Independent Schools Foundation Academy	St. Stephen's College	Victoria Shanghai Academy
2023–2024	Pui Ching Middle School	Fukien Secondary School (Kwun Tong)	St. Paul's Co-educational College	West Island School	Hong Kong University Graduates Association College	South Island School	St. Margaret's Co-educational English Secondary and Primary School	Sheng Kung Hui Tang Shiu Kin Secondary School	Tsung Tsin Christian Academy		
2022–2023	-	-	-	-	-	-	-	-	-		
2021–2022	-	-	-	-	-	-	-	-	-		
2020–2021	-	-	-	-	-	-	-	-	-		
2019–2020	-	-	-	-	-	-	-	-	-		
2018–2019	St. Paul's Co-educational College	Fukien Secondary School (Kwun Tong)	Pui Ching Middle School	West Island School	South Island School	King George V School	Hong Kong University Graduates Association College	Sheng Kung Hui Tang Shiu Kin Secondary School	St. Margaret's Co-educational English Secondary and Primary School		
2017–2018	Fukien Secondary School (Kwun Tong)	St. Paul's Co-educational College	Pui Ching Middle School	West Island School	South Island School	King George V School	Hong Kong University Graduates Association College; St. Stephen's College	-	Raimondi College		
2016–2017	St. Paul's Co-educational College	Fukien Secondary School (Kwun Tong)	West Island School	Pui Ching Middle School	South Island School	King George V School	Wa Ying College	St. Stephen's College	Shun Tak Fraternal Association Cheng Yu Tung Secondary School		
2015–2016	St. Paul's Co-educational College	Fukien Secondary School (Kwun Tong)	West Island School	Pui Ching Middle School	South Island School	Wa Ying College	King George V School	St. Stephen's College	Cheung Chuk Shan College		
2014–2015	St. Paul's Co-educational College	Fukien Secondary School (Kwun Tong)	West Island School	Pui Ching Middle School	King George V School	South Island School	Wa Ying College	Chinese International School	Hon Wah College		
2013–2014	West Island School	St. Paul's Co-educational College	Pui Ching Middle School	Fukien Secondary School (Kwun Tong)	South Island School	King George V School	Wa Ying College	The Chinese Foundation Secondary School	Hong Kong Chinese Christian Churches Union Logos Academy		
2012–2013	West Island School	Fukien Secondary School (Kwun Tong)	Pui Ching Middle School; St. Paul's Co-educational College	-	King George V School	South Island School	Wa Ying College	St. Stephen's College	South Island School		
2011–2012	Pui Ching Middle School	King George V School	St. Paul's Co-educational College	West Island School	Fukien Secondary School (Kwun Tong)	The Chinese Foundation Secondary School	Wa Ying College	Sheng Kung Hui Tang Shiu Kin Secondary School	Hong Kong University Graduates Association College		
2010–2011	West Island School	King George V School	Pui Ching Middle School	Fukien Secondary School (Kwun Tong)	Sheng Kung Hui Tang Shiu Kin Secondary School	Wa Ying College	St. Paul's Co-educational College	The Chinese Foundation Secondary School	Fukien Secondary School (Kwun Tong)		
2009–2010	King George V School	West Island School	Wa Ying College	Sheng Kung Hui Tang Shiu Kin Secondary School	Pui Ching Middle School	St. Stephen's College	Island School	St. Paul's Co-educational College	Sheng Kung Hui Lui Ming Choi Secondary School		
2008–2009	King George V School	West Island School	Pui Ching Middle School	Island School	The Chinese Foundation Secondary School	St. Paul's Co-educational College	Sheng Kung Hui Tang Shiu Kin Secondary School	Wa Ying College	Fukien Secondary School (Kwun Tong)		
2007–2008	Pui Ching Middle School	Island School	West Island School	St. Paul's Co-educational College	King George V School	South Island School	Wa Ying College	Chinese International School; St. Stephen's College	Fukien Secondary School (Kwun Tong)		
2006–2007	Island School	Pui Ching Middle School	West Island School	King George V School	Chinese International School	The Chinese Foundation Secondary School	St. Paul's Co-educational College	South Island School	St. Stephen's College		
2005–2006	Island School	King George V School	St. Paul's Co-educational College	-	-	-	-	-	South Island School		
2004–2005	Island School	Hong Kong International School	West Island School	-	-	-	-	-	West Island School		
2003–2004	Hong Kong International School	King George V School	Island School	-	-	-	-	-	The Chinese Foundation Secondary School		
2002–2003	Island School	Hong Kong International School	King George V School	-	-	-	-	-	Hoi Ping Chamber of Commerce Secondary School		
2001–2002	Island School	Hong Kong International School	King George V School	-	-	-	-	-	Tung Wah Group of Hospitals Lui Yun Choy Memorial College		
2000–2001	Island School	Hong Kong International School	King George V School	-	-	-	-	-	West Island School		
1999–2000	Island School	King George V School	Hong Kong International School	-	-	-	-	-	United Christian College (Tai Hang Tung)		
1998–1999	Island School	Hong Kong International School	King George V School	-	-	-	-	-	Cognitio College, Kowloon		
1997–1998	Hong Kong International School	Island School	King George V School	-	-	-	-	-	Sheng Kung Hui Lui Ming Choi Secondary School		
1996–1997	Hong Kong International School	Island School	King George V School	-	-	-	-	-	Chinese International School		
1995–1996	Island School	Hong Kong International School	King George V School	-	-	-	-	-	Rosaryhill School		
1994–1995	Island School	Hong Kong International School	King George V School	-	-	-	-	-	Island School		
1993–1994	Island School	Hong Kong International School	-	-	-	-	-	-	South Island School		
1992–1993	Hong Kong International School	Island School	-	-	-	-	-	-	South Island School		
1991–1992	Hong Kong International School	King George V School	-	-	-	-	-	-	Pui Ching Middle School		
1990–1991	King George V School	Island School	-	-	-	-	-	-	Shun Tak Fraternal Association Seaward Woo College		
1989–1990	King George V School	Island School	-	-	-	-	-	-	Rosaryhill School		
1988–1989	Island School	King George V School	-	-	-	-	-	-	-		
1987–1988	King George V School	Island School	-	-	-	-	-	-	Hong Kong International School		
1986–1987	King George V School	Island School	-	-	-	-	-	-	St. Stephen's College		
1985–1986	King George V School	Island School	-	-	-	-	-	-	German Swiss International School		
1984–1985	King George V School	Island School	-	-	-	-	-	-	Man Kiu College		
1983–1984	King George V School	Island School	-	-	-	-	-	-	Delia Memorial School (Mei Foo)		
1982–1983	King George V School; Island School	-	-	-	-	-	-	-	The Church of Christ in China Mong Man Wai College		
1981–1982	Island School	King George V School	-	-	-	-	-	-	South Island School		
1980–1981	Island School	King George V School	-	-	-	-	-	-	Cognitio College, Kowloon		
1979–1980	Island School	King George V School	-	-	-	-	-	-	Delia Memorial School (Yuet Wah)		
1978–1979	Island School	King George V School	-	-	-	-	-	-	Wa Ying College		
1977–1978	Island School	King George V School	-	-	-	-	-	-	Pui Ching Middle School		
1976–1977	Island School	King George V School	-	-	-	-	-	-	New Method College, Hong Kong		
1975–1976	King George V School	Island School	-	-	-	-	-	-	Mongkok Workers' Children School		
1974–1975	King George V School	Island School	-	-	-	-	-	-	-		
1973–1974	King George V School	Island School	-	-	-	-	-	-	St. George's School		
1972–1973	King George V School	Island School	-	-	-	-	-	-	Pui Kiu Middle School		
1971–1972	King George V School	Island School	-	-	-	-	-	-	New Method College, Kowloon		
1970–1971	King George V School	Island School	-	-	-	-	-	-	Rosaryhill School		
1969–1970	King George V School	Hong Kong International School	-	-	-	-	-	-	Island School		
1968–1969	King George V School	Hong Kong International School	-	-	-	-	-	-	Shau Kei Wan Government Secondary School		
1967–1968	King George V School	Pui Ching Middle School	-	-	-	-	-	-	-		
1966–1967	King George V School	-	-	-	-	-	-	-	-		
1965–1966	King George V School	-	-	-	-	-	-	-	-		

=== Sportsboys of the Year (Boys Schools) ===
Season	Winner	School
2024–2025	Lam Lok Shi	Diocesan Boys' School
2023–2024	Wong Yi Hin	Diocesan Boys' School
2022–2023	Wong Yi Hin	Diocesan Boys' School
2021–2022	-	-
2020–2021	-	-
2019–2020	-	-
2018–2019	To Wai Lok	Diocesan Boys' School
2017–2018	Chan Ching Fung	La Salle College
2016–2017	Lin Yun To, Toby	Diocesan Boys' School
2015–2016	Wong Man Hong	Diocesan Boys' School
2014–2015	Wong Man Hong	Diocesan Boys' School
2013–2014	Wong Man Hong	Diocesan Boys' School
2012–2013	Leung Yam Wah, Bryan	Diocesan Boys' School
2011–2012	Chan Chi Wai, Alex	La Salle College
2010–2011	Pang Ying Kit	La Salle College
2009–2010	Pang Ying Kit	La Salle College
2008–2009	Au Yeung Chun Yu	La Salle College
2007–2008	Au Yeung Chun Yu	La Salle College
2006–2007	Chan Ye Ko, Ricco	La Salle College
2005–2006	Chan Ye Ko, Ricco	La Salle College
2004–2005	Chan Ye Ko, Ricco	La Salle College
2003–2004	Chan King Chung, Derwin	Diocesan Boys' School
2002–2003	Chan King Chung, Derwin	Diocesan Boys' School
2001–2002	Tam Wai Yeung	Chong Gene Hang College
2000–2001	Tam Wai Yeung	Chong Gene Hang College
1999–2000	Tam Wai Yeung	Chong Gene Hang College
1998–1999	Tam Wai Yeung	Chong Gene Hang College
1997–1998	Kwok Kar Lok, Kenneth	Wah Yan College, Hong Kong
1996–1997	Mak Ho Nung	La Salle College
1995–1996	Tang Hon Sing	Diocesan Boys' School
1994–1995	Rudy Chung Sing Fook	Diocesan Boys' School
1993–1994	Kevin Liu Chun Ki	La Salle College
1992–1993	-	-
1991–1992	Yang Wing Ning	Ying Wa College
1990–1991	To Sze Wai	Chan Sui Ki (La Salle) College
1989–1990	Wong Pui Hung, William	Diocesan Boys' School
1988–1989	Ernie Tam	Diocesan Boys' School
1987–1988	-	-
1986–1987	Joseph Wong	Diocesan Boys' School
1985–1986	Mark Huang	La Salle College
1984–1985	Yeung Ying Ming	La Salle College
1983–1984	-	-
1982–1983	William Lee Sai Wing	La Salle College
1981–1982	Kenny Yip Hon Keung	Diocesan Boys' School
1980–1981	Bosco Chan Sai Lam	La Salle College
1979–1980	Cheuk Ho Yeung	Diocesan Boys' School
1978–1979	Edward Yan Wai Fu	La Salle College
1977–1978	Miguel Martin Delgado	La Salle College
1976–1977	Bernard Suen	Diocesan Boys' School
1975–1976	Septimus Kwong Nai Bun	La Salle College
1974–1975	Chan Yeuk Yung	Diocesan Boys' School
1973–1974	Alexander Leung Wai Kong	Ying Wa College
1972–1973	Tom Hsiao	La Salle College
1971–1972	Au Yiu Hing, Romeo	Ying Wa College
1970–1971	Alex Ko	Diocesan Boys' School
1969–1970	Yeung Shiu Ling	Salesian English School
1968–1969	Louis Wipuchanin	Diocesan Boys' School
1967–1968	William Ko	Diocesan Boys' School
1966–1967	Maurice Lam Man Ho	Diocesan Boys' School
1965–1966	Harn Kiatfuengfoo	Diocesan Boys' School

=== Sportsgirls of the Year (Girls Schools) ===
Season	Winner	School
2024–2025	Cheung Hoi Yan	Diocesan Girls' School
2023–2024	Cheung Hoi Yan	Diocesan Girls' School
2022–2023	Lee Sum Yuet Charlotte	Heep Yunn School
2021–2022	-	-
2020–2021	-	-
2019–2020	-	-
2018–2019	Wong Cheuk Ning	Heep Yunn School
2017–2018	Lau Fong Ying, Karen	Heep Yunn School
2016–2017	Lau Fong Ying, Karen	Heep Yunn School
2015–2016	Lai Nga Man, Amanda	Heep Yunn School
2014–2015	Cheung Kiu Wai	Diocesan Girls' School
2013–2014	Li Tsz Kwan, Rachel	Heep Yunn School
2012–2013	Leung Ya Yuan, Rachel	Diocesan Girls' School
2011–2012	Ho Yin Chiu	Good Hope School
2010–2011	Tong Tsz Wing	Heep Yunn School
2009–2010	Lai Hiu Tung, Vivian	Heep Yunn School
2008–2009	Woo Wing Tung	Diocesan Girls' School
2007–2008	Woo Wing Tung	Diocesan Girls' School
2006–2007	Woo Wing Tung	Diocesan Girls' School
2005–2006	Woo Wing Tung	Diocesan Girls' School
2004–2005	Chan Yu Ning, Elaine	Heep Yunn School
2003–2004	Lau Janice Chi Kay	Diocesan Girls' School
2002–2003	Lau Janice Chi Kay	Diocesan Girls' School
2001–2002	Sherry Tsai Hiu Wai	Diocesan Girls' School
2000–2001	Sherry Tsai Hiu Wai	Diocesan Girls' School
1999–2000	Sherry Tsai Hiu Wai	Diocesan Girls' School
1998–1999	Kay Wong	Diocesan Girls' School
1997–1998	Kay Wong	Diocesan Girls' School
1996–1997	Wendy Hung	Diocesan Girls' School
1995–1996	Robyn Lamsam	Diocesan Girls' School
1994–1995	Robyn Lamsam	Diocesan Girls' School
1993–1994	Florence Lai	Diocesan Girls' School
1992–1993	Angela Ho	Diocesan Girls' School
1991–1992	Choi Hiu Nam	Heep Yunn School
1990–1991	Florence Lai	Diocesan Girls' School
1989–1990	Wong Lai Yue	St. Catharine's School for Girls, Kwun Tong
1988–1989	Rebecca Chau	Diocesan Girls' School
1987–1988	Malina Ngai	Maryknoll Convent School
1986–1987	Malina Ngai	Maryknoll Convent School
1985–1986	Malina Ngai	Maryknoll Convent School
1984–1985	Ingrid Lai	Diocesan Girls' School
1983–1984	-	-
1982–1983	Sandra Khoo	Diocesan Girls' School
1981–1982	Michele Rosario	Diocesan Girls' School
1980–1981	Krista Ma	Diocesan Girls' School
1979–1980	Margaret Hung	Maryknoll Convent School
1978–1979	Angela Lau	Diocesan Girls' School
1977–1978	Ho Ngar Ying	Belilios Public School
1976–1977	Michelle Remedios	Maryknoll Convent School
1975–1976	Barbara Hung	Maryknoll Convent School
1974–1975	Rita Bendall	Diocesan Girls' School
1973–1974	Barbara Hung	Maryknoll Convent School
1972–1973	Diane U	Diocesan Girls' School
1971–1972	Joan Ling	Maryknoll Convent School
1970–1971	Susan Johnson	Diocesan Girls' School
1969–1970	Kim Fenton	Diocesan Girls' School
1968–1969	Ann Mikel	Diocesan Girls' School
1967–1968	Ann Mikel	Diocesan Girls' School
1966–1967	Barbara Winyard	Diocesan Girls' School
1965–1966	Pamela Baker	Diocesan Girls' School

=== Sportsboys of the Year (Co-educational Schools) ===
Season	Winner(s)	School(s)
2024–2025	Chan Lok Hei Ewan	Pui Ching Middle School
2023–2024	Tang On Kit	Pui Ching Middle School
2022–2023	Li Sing Hoi	Pui Ching Middle School
2021–2022	-	-
2020–2021	-	-
2019–2020	-	-
2018–2019	-	-
2017–2018	Clayton Daisuke Gibb	West Island School
2016–2017	-	-
2015–2016	Miles Jing Williams	West Island School
2014–2015	Lau Kin Hei	Pui Ching Middle School
2013–2014	Ross William Mason	West Island School
2012–2013	Joshua Kriesel	West Island School
2011–2012	Siu Cheong Hung	Wa Ying College
2010–2011	Siu Cheong Hung	Wa Ying College
2009–2010	Dev Dillon	King George V School
2008–2009	Rohit Rathi	West Island School
2007–2008	Lee Chun Lok	Pui Ching Middle School
2006–2007	Tom Owens	West Island School
2005–2006	Alexander McQueen	South Island School
2004–2005	Keith Robertson	West Island School
2003–2004	Keith Robertson	West Island School
2002–2003	Rowan Varty	King George V School
2001–2002	Daniel Bailey	Island School
2000–2001	Daniel Bailey	Island School
1999–2000	Poon Wai King	New Method College
1998–1999	Tom Breen	Island School
1997–1998	Chan Ming Sang; Michael Scott	St. Stephen's College; Island School
1996–1997	James Endicott	Island School
1995–1996	Alex Gibbs	Island School
1994–1995	-	-
1993–1994	James Hartwright; Mok Wing Kwong	King George V School; Pui Ching Middle School
1992–1993	James Wilson	South Island School
1991–1992	Jeremy Carter	King George V School
1990–1991	Simon Billingham	King George V School
1989–1990	Mark Thompson	King George V School
1988–1989	Julian Hart	King George V School
1987–1988	Ian Billingham	King George V School
1986–1987	Brian Neir	King George V School
1985–1986	Robin Bredbury	King George V School
1984–1985	Johnathan Cannon	King George V School
1983–1984	Simon Myles	King George V School
1982–1983	Pat Clunie	King George V School
1981–1982	David Hall	King George V School
1980–1981	David Evans	King George V School
1979–1980	Jan Weddepohi; Dermot Reeve	Island School; King George V School
1978–1979	Tse Chi Hung; G. Claydon	Cheung Sha Wan Catholic Secondary School; Island School
1977–1978	Luke McGuinniety	Island School
1976–1977	Philip Reeve	King George V School
1975–1976	Allan Wood	St. George's School
1974–1975	Jeremy Ozorio	King George V School
1973–1974	William Hunter	Island School
1972–1973	Michael Bentley	King George V School
1971–1972	-	-
1970–1971	A. Ainsworth	King George V School
1969–1970	Grant Osborne	King George V School
1968–1969	Tierry Newbert	King George V School
1967–1968	John Drake	King George V School
1966–1967	R. Barros	King George V School
1965–1966	Danie Hooloy	King George V School

=== Sportsgirls of the Year (Co-educational Schools) ===
Season	Winner	School
2024–2025	Yau Tsoi Man	Creative Secondary School
2023–2024	Ngor Hui Wa Jacqueline	Pui Ching Middle School
2022–2023	Ngor Hui Wa Jacqueline	Pui Ching Middle School
2021–2022	-	-
2020–2021	-	-
2019–2020	-	-
2018–2019	Ng Tsz Ching	Fukien Secondary School (Kwun Tong)
2017–2018	Lucia Mary Pascale Bolton	West Island School
2016–2017	Erin Rose Brown	West Island School
2015–2016	Lau Sheung Hok	Fukien Secondary School (Kwun Tong)
2014–2015	Yue Oi Yan	Tung Wah Group of Hospitals Lui Yun Choy Memorial College
2013–2014	Ng Vanessa	King George V School
2012–2013	Bridget Marie Kriesel	West Island School
2011–2012	Jemima Jones	West Island School
2010–2011	Lui Lai Yiu	Pui Ching Middle School
2009–2010	Huang Meng Yu	Pui Ching Middle School
2008–2009	Ng Hei Man	The Chinese Foundation Secondary School
2007–2008	Cheuk Ting	Tsung Tsin Middle School
2006–2007	Cheng Choi Ling	St. Stephen's College
2005–2006	Christine Joy Bailey	King George V School
2004–2005	Morgan Gibson	Island School
2003–2004	Katherine Mountain	Island School
2002–2003	Katherine Mountain	Island School
2001–2002	Amanda Robertson	Island School
2000–2001	Sandra Frankland	King George V School
1999–2000	Olivia Chiu	Chinese International School
1998–1999	Erin Joy	King George V School
1997–1998	Diana Ong	King George V School
1996–1997	Georgina McFetridge	King George V School
1995–1996	Lorea Solabarrieta	King George V School
1994–1995	Shelley Reid	King George V School
1993–1994	Caroline Ng	South Island School
1992–1993	-	-
1991–1992	Indrani Chakrabati	Island School
1990–1991	-	-
1989–1990	Amanda Noble	King George V School
1988–1989	Katrina Wilson	South Island School
1987–1988	Crystine Lee	King George V School
1986–1987	Katrina Mansfield	Island School
1985–1986	Lynne Caravias	Island School
1984–1985	Lucy Lomas	South Island School
1983–1984	Delnar Talati	Island School
1982–1983	Lynne Huddleston	Island School
1981–1982	Tessaly Stonham	Island School
1980–1981	Sarah Caller	Island School
1979–1980	Evelyn Buckley	King George V School
1978–1979	Sara Robertson	Island School
1977–1978	Evelyn Buckley	King George V School
1976–1977	Brenda Crace	Island School
1975–1976	Louise Everett	St. George's School
1974–1975	Vanessa Neal	King George V School
1973–1974	Vanessa Neal	King George V School
1972–1973	Cathy Ross	King George V School
1971–1972	L. Migo	King George V School
1970–1971	A. Christian	Hong Kong International School
1969–1970	D. D. Murphy	Hong Kong International School
1968–1969	Cathy McCausland	King George V School
1967–1968	Diana Walsh	King George V School
1966–1967	Niv Metrevelli	King George V School
1965–1966	Carol Nelson	King George V School

=== Summary statistics ===
==== Boys Schools Champion (up till the Season 2024 – 2025) ====
School	Number of Champion-year(s)
Diocesan Boys' School	29
La Salle College	26
Ying Wa College	1

==== Girls Schools Champion (up till the Season 2024 – 2025) ====
School	Number of Champion-years
Heep Yunn School	37
Diocesan Girls' School	16
Maryknoll Convent School	4

==== Co-educational Schools Champion (up till the Season 2024 – 2025) ====
School	Number of Champion-years
King George V School	21
Island School	19
Hong Kong International School	5
St. Paul's Co-educational College	4
Pui Ching Middle School	4
West Island School	3
Fukien Secondary School (Kwun Tong)	1

==== Sportsboy of the Year (Boys Schools) (up till the Season 2024 – 2025) ====
School	Number of Year(s) awarded with Sportsboy of the Year (Boys Schools)
Diocesan Boys' School	25
La Salle College	19
Chong Gene Hang College	4
Ying Wa College	3
Salesian English School	1
Chan Sui Ki (La Salle) College	1
Wah Yan College, Hong Kong	1

==== Sportsgirl of the Year (Girls Schools) (up till the Season 2024 – 2025) ====
School	Number of Year(s) awarded with Sportsgirl of the Year (Girls Schools)
Diocesan Girls' School	35
Heep Yunn School	10
Maryknoll Convent School	8
Belilios Public School	1
St. Catharine's School for Girls, Kwun Tong	1
Good Hope School	1

==== Sportsboy of the Year (Co-educational Schools) (up till the Season 2024 – 2025) ====
School	Number of Year(s) awarded with Sportsboy of the Year (Co-educational Schools)
King George V School	25
Island School	10
West Island School	8
Pui Ching Middle School	6
South Island School	2
Wa Ying College	2
St. George's School	1
Cheung Sha Wan Catholic Secondary School	1
St. Stephen's College	1
New Method College	1

==== Sportsgirl of the Year (Co-educational Schools) (up till the Season 2024 – 2025) ====
School	Number of Year(s) awarded with Sportsgirl of the Year (Co-educational Schools)
King George V School	20
Island School	13
West Island School	4
Pui Ching Middle School	4
South Island School	3
Hong Kong International School	2
Fukien Secondary School (Kwun Tong)	2
St. George's School	1
Chinese International School	1
St. Stephen's College	1
Tsung Tsin Middle School	1
The Chinese Foundation Secondary School	1
Tung Wah Group of Hospitals Lui Yun Choy Memorial College	1
Creative Secondary School	1
