= King George V School, Hong Kong =

Coordinates: 22.321540°N 114.182953°E

King George V School
- 英皇佐治五世學校

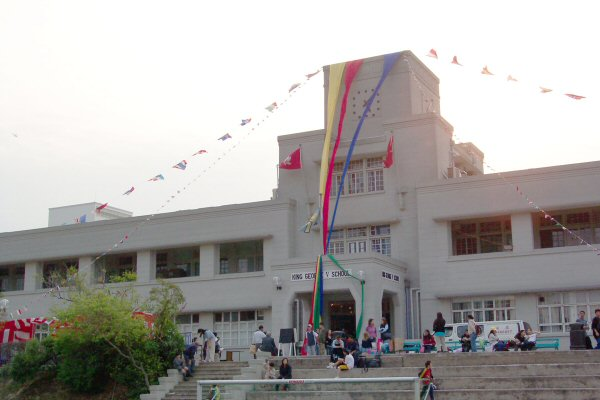
- 2 Tin Kwong Rd., Ho Man Tin, Hong Kong

Information
- Type: International secondary Independent school co-educational
- Motto: Honestas Ante Honores (English: Honesty Before Glory)
- Established: 1894 (as Kowloon College)
- School district: Kowloon City
- Principal: Mark Poulsum (2023-present)
- Years offered: 7-13
- Enrollment: 1900-2100 (approx.)
- Campus size: 10.2 acres (4.1 ha)
- Colours: gold, navy blue, black
- Mascot: Lion
- Publication: The Lion (annual yearbook)
- Website: kgv.edu.hk

Chinese name
- Traditional Chinese: 英皇佐治五世學校
- Simplified Chinese: 英皇佐治五世学校
Transcriptions
Standard Mandarin
- Hanyu Pinyin: Yīnghuáng Zuǒzhì Wǔshì Xuéxiào
Yue: Cantonese
- Yale Romanization: Yīng wòhng jo jih ńgh sai hohk haauh
- Jyutping: Jing1 wong4 zo3 zi6 ng5 sai3 hok6 haau6

King George V School (KGV, pronounced "K-G-Five") is a coeducational international secondary independent school of the English Schools Foundation (ESF), located in Ho Man Tin, Hong Kong. The school has more than 1,900 students and is one of the oldest schools in Hong Kong. Students take IGCSEs/GCSEs followed by the International Baccalaureate Diploma/Career-oriented Programme or the British BTEC programme. The campus has an area of 10.2 acres (4.1 ha). The school is one of three ESF secondary schools in Kowloon and the New Territories, the others being Sha Tin College and Renaissance College.

== History ==
=== Pre-WWII period ===
KGV is the oldest of all schools in the English Schools Foundation, as well as the oldest international school in Hong Kong. It first opened in 1894 on Nathan Road, and originally catered for the children of British people living in Kowloon. At the time, the school occupied just one small building. It was destroyed in a typhoon in 1896, and Kowloon College opened in its place in 1902. A major opening ceremony took place and was attended by many of Hong Kong's elite, including Major General Gascoigne, the Apostolic Vicar of the territory's diocese Louis Piazzoli, and the Colonial Secretary J.H. Stewart Lockhart. The school was built using donations from Hong Kong businessman Sir Robert Hotung. The school was subsequently renamed the Kowloon British School, then the Central British School, and later King George V School.

By 1930, the number of students in the school had grown to 300. Wooden huts were built at the back of the school to create extra classrooms. The playground was only 7 m^{2} (75 sq ft). The then-headmaster, Mr. Nightingale, asked for and acquired a new and bigger school site, designed by teacher Thomas Rowell. Classes at the new site began on 14 September 1936. The first headmaster of KGV was Reverend Upsdell, and the foundation stone for the new building was laid by Sir William Peel, the governor of Hong Kong at the time. The building has subsequently been named the Peel Block in his honor.

=== Sino-Japanese War ===
In 1937, the Japanese invaded China. Many women and children were evacuated from Shanghai to Hong Kong. They needed a place to stay, and the school was used as a refugee camp. However, as the Japanese neared Hong Kong, the government ordered the evacuation of most women and children from Hong Kong. Thereafter, the school was used by British forces as a hospital. When Hong Kong surrendered in the Battle of Hong Kong, the school site was taken over by the Japanese and used as a hospital for prisoners of war.

=== Post-WWII period ===
After the war, the school reopened in 1946, and in 1947 the school opened its doors to students of all nationalities. In 1948, the school's name was officially changed to King George V School.

In 1979, principal Angela Smith decided that KGV should join the English Schools Foundation, and the transfer was complete by 1981. KGV is currently the oldest active school in the ESF.

=== Additional Information ===
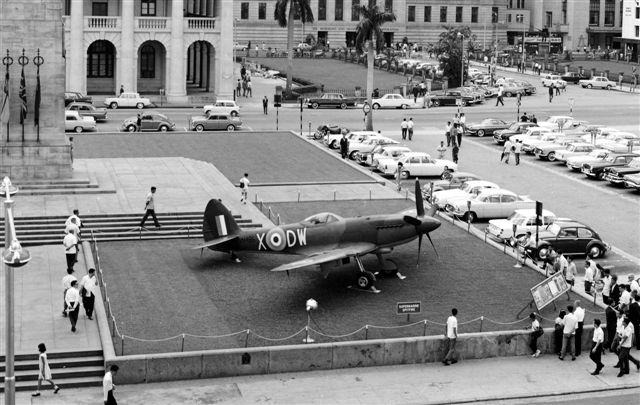
Image of the Spitfire aircraft located on KGV grounds during the 1950s, pictured here in the Cenotaph in Central in 1965

In 2009, musician Mika visited King George V School. He viewed the artwork based on his music (created by Advanced Diploma students) and helped finish a mural on the B-block wall, painting "I am not what you think I am / I am made of gold." He followed by performing Grace Kelly for the students.

A truncated body of a Spitfire aircraft was placed in a classroom of the school up until the 1950s. It was stored in the basement of the pavilion, until the Air Commodore had it removed, restored and later placed it at the Cenotaph in Central for Remembrance Day.

== Students and the house system ==
A group of senior students at KGV

There are more than 1,850 students of around 28 different nationalities enrolled in the school. Students are accepted from many ESF feeder primary schools in the English Schools Foundation such as Kowloon Junior School, Clear Water Bay School and Beacon Hill School.

KGV, like many British schools, has a house system with four colours. This system is used in intra-school events and competitions.

== Curriculum ==
The curriculum adopted by KGV, as an international school, is different from the DSE examination system used in local schools.

=== Middle school curriculum ===
MYP
Subject Group	Subjects taught at KGV
Creative Arts	Art, Drama, Music, Media
Design	Design Technology, Food Technology, ICT, Computer Science
Individual and Societies	Geography, History and Philosophy & Religious Studies
Language Acquisitions	Chinese, French, Spanish and German (or Mother Tongue)
Language and Literature	English and/or Chinese
Maths	Maths
Sciences	Biology, Chemistry, Physics. (Any combination of the 3 is included as well)
Physical and Health Development	PE and Liberal and Personal Studies

=== IGCSE ===
In Years 10 and 11, all students follow a course leading to iGCSE (International General Certificate of Secondary Education) examinations in their chosen subjects. Some subjects are compulsory, but there is a choice to suit the aptitude and interest of students. All students are required to study the core subjects of English, Mathematics, Science (split into Biology, Chemistry and Physics as Single Award and Double Award), PE, and PSHE (Personal, Social and Health Education). Students must choose four further subjects by choosing one of the subjects from each of the boxes. Students cannot choose more than one Design & Technology subject, choose more than one European language, or study both Business and Economics.

Box 1 (languages)	First Language: Chinese (Mandarin), Japanese, Korean Second Language: Chinese (Mandarin) Foreign Language: Chinese (Mandarin), French, German, Spanish Self-taught mother tongue
Box 2 (individuals and societies)	Business Studies, Computer Science, Economics, Geography, History, ICT, Psychology, Religious Studies
Box 3 (creative)	Art, Music, Sports Science, Drama, Media (A BTEC course as of 2017), Computer Science, DT Electronics, DT Resistant Materials, DT Graphics, DT Food, DT Textiles
Box 4 (open option)	Another subject from Boxes 1, 2 or 3.

=== IB Diploma ===
Starting from September 2007, KGV replaced the existing British A-Level Program with the International Baccalaureate diploma, offering the Diploma Programme. All students have to complete the core syllabus, consisting of an Extended Essay, Theory of Knowledge and Creativity, Activity, Service, as well as six subjects, wherein subjects in First Language, Second Language, Individuals and Societies, Science and Mathematics are required. Artistic or creative subjects are also offered, though these are optional.

=== BTEC ===
From September 2011 the school replaced the A-Level Programme (which was an option for students who did not want to take IB) with the BTEC International Diploma, a vocational course.

== Sports ==
The school has an official size AstroTurf playing field for football and rugby. In 2008 and 2009, KGV were back-to-back winners of the Bauhinia Bowl, becoming the best co-educational sporting school in Hong Kong for the academic year.

=== Rugby ===
During the 2007/08 school year, the A-Grade boys' rugby team won the 15s, 10s and 7s rugby tournament. The women's team includes many Hong Kong Bauhinia U16 rugby representatives, as well as players for the Hong Kong U18 Development and U18 Nationals. In 2013 the women's team won the cup against the Hong Kong Standard Charter Select team in the first Bill Williams 7s tournament with a women's section.

=== Football ===
The school often takes part in the Jing Ying Inter-School Football Tournament.

=== Basketball ===
In the 2011–2012 season, the KGV A-Grade boys' basketball team won the HKSSF Division 3 basketball championship for the first time in program history. In the 2023–24 season, the B-Grade boys' basketball team also won the ISSFHK Silver Division 2 championship.

=== Swimming ===
The girls and boys swimming teams compete separately in the annual Hong Kong Schools Sports Foundation (HKSSF) interschool competition, with the girls team achieving a promotion to the Division 1 competition in 2018 and the boys team continuing to perform strongly in Division 2. KGV has produced many swimmers who have won podium places in their events at the HKSSF swimming competitions. KGV swimmers regularly represent the English Schools Foundation at the annual Wheelock Swim for Millions charity race organised by the community chest. 2015 marked KGV's best showing in the competition with the boys opens team winning the school relay and the overall competition while the staff team came third in the corporate relay.

== Facilities ==
KGV School Hall – Speech Day 2001

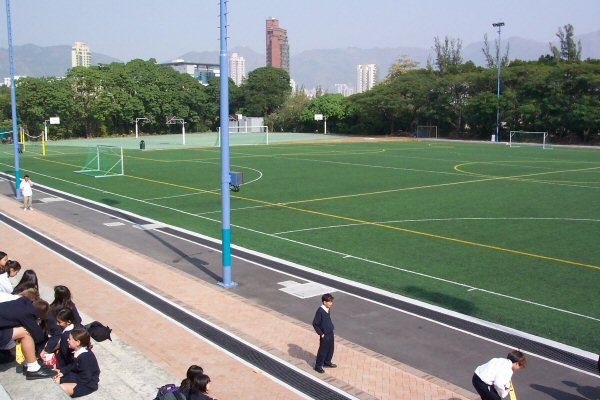
KGV School Field

=== School Field ===
KGV's artificially turfed field is ESF's multipurpose sports facility. It has markings for various sports, such as rugby, football (soccer), hockey, and also has a long & triple jump track running the perimeter of the field. The field itself is 100 metres long, and is flanked on its school side by a 100-metre-long sprint track and seating facilities for students.

The field was reopened on 29 April 2014 after a HK$34 million renovation. On the opening day, 575 students broke the Guinness World Record of 'Most Participants in a Beep Test', previously held by a college in Australia. This is the second world record broken by the school, the other being 'Most People Planking Simultaneously' with 1,549 students on 16 December 2011. In 2014, the field was rebuilt and to celebrate, the school went for the world record of Most People Participating in the Multi-Stage Fitness Test. A then-record of 575 beep test participants out of the 587 participants who started successfully completed the required number of intervals. This record was ratified by the Guinness World Records until it was broken by AFC Harrogate in 2017.

Note that the field was temporarily closed due to property vandalism and misuse.

== Concerns ==
The school has dealt with major issues in the previous years, especially regarding phone misuse and toilet vandalism:

Gate-To-Gate

By 2025, students have consistently shown misbehaviors and misuse regarding mobile devices, leading to the implementation of the Gate-To-Gate policy. On May 23, 2025, King George V School has decided that it the time to officially implement the Gate-To-Gate Policy, strictly banning all student mobile phone use on campus from 8am to 3 in the afternoon.

"I have always seen students misbehaving and being inappropriate in the school campus, and I am really disappointed to see such behavior, especially gaming during lessons. This not only harms student's learning journey but also puts the school's reputation at risk", the principal of the school stated on one afternoon. "I hope the following weeks after the implementation of the Gate-To-Gate Policy, students will be more mature and healthier individuals."

"We will always enforce and adhere to our school values, to ensure stability and high-quality growth within our KGV community", he further added.

KGV has always pursued an important role in fostering healthier lifestyle habits among its student body, actively addressing the physical and psychological toll of excessive screen time. This definite action signals a firm rejection of mobile phone use within the learning environment, reflecting an clear goal of high-quality, uninterrupted academic focus. KGV is also adopting a similar style of Australian school of total youth phone ban. Furthermore, KGV has been repeatedly stressing the importance of a distraction-free education, while praising the Australian Government's bold decision to enforce a total ban on social media for minors under 16.

== Notable alumni ==
See also Category:Alumni of King George V School, Hong Kong

- Kemal Bokhary – former Permanent Judge of the Court of Final Appeal
- Martin Booth – novelist and poet
- Tim Bredbury – professional footballer. Former clubs include Liverpool, Seiko, South China A.A., Sydney Olympic, Selangor and the Hong Kong National Team.
- Loletta Chu – the winner of 1977 Miss Hong Kong Pageant.
- Victor Fung — GBS – Chairman of the Airport Authority Hong Kong, Li & Fung Group, the Hong Kong-Japan Business Co-operation Committee and Co-Chair of the Evian Group.
- Adderly Fong - Canadian-Hong Kong racing driver.
- Kim Gordon – American musician, songwriter, and visual artist.
- Michael Hutchence – lead singer of Australian band INXS.
- Toby Leung — singer and actress
- Shiga Lin – Cantopop singer and actress
- Jaimes McKee – Hong Kong football player.
- David Millar – professional cyclist on the Garmin-Chipotle Team & Tour de France Stage Winner
- Anthony Mosse - Hong Kong born New Zealand swimmer. Attended KGV until age 14.
- Anders Nelsson – singer, songwriter, music producer, and director of music company.
- Aarif Rahman — singer and actor
- Dermot Reeve – England cricketer, known as an unorthodox all-rounder.
- Perry So – former assistant and associate conductor of the Hong Kong Philharmonic Orchestra
- Brigadier Mike Stone – former chief information officer of the British Ministry of Defence
- Stanley Tang – cofounder of DoorDash
- Jason Tobin – British-Chinese actor known for his role as Virgil Hu in Justin Lin's Better Luck Tomorrow.
- Rowan Varty – Hong Kong rugby player.
- Charles Ying — singer and actor
- Aarush Bhagwat – Hong Kong cricketer
