= English Schools Foundation =

Educational organization in Hong Kong

English Schools Foundation 英基學校協會

Address
- 12/F, Island Place Tower, 510 King's Road, North Point Hong Kong

District information
- Established: 1967
- Chief executive officer: Belinda Greer
- Chair of the board: Kim Mak
- Schools: 24

Students and staff
- Students: 18,000
- Teachers: 1,251

Other information
- Website: esf.edu.hk

English Schools Foundation
- Traditional Chinese: 英基學校協會
- Simplified Chinese: 英基学校协会
Transcriptions
Standard Mandarin
- Hanyu Pinyin: Yīngjī Xuéxiào Xiéhuì
Yue: Cantonese
- Yale Romanization: Yīng gēi hohk haauh hip wúi
- Jyutping: Jing1 gei1 hok6 haau6 hip3 wui2

ESF
- Chinese: 英基
Transcriptions
Standard Mandarin
- Hanyu Pinyin: Yīngjī
Yue: Cantonese
- Yale Romanization: Yíng gēi
- Jyutping: Jing1 gei1

The English Schools Foundation (ESF) is an organisation that runs 24 international schools in Hong Kong. It is Hong Kong's largest English-medium organisation of international schools, as well as the largest international school association in Asia. It was founded in 1967 with the passage of the English Schools Foundation Ordinance.

In addition to tuition fees, the foundation receives an ongoing subsidy from the Hong Kong Government, which is being phased out. The schools also receive donations from their parent–teacher associations.

== History ==
In 1965, the Hong Kong government released its "Education Policy" white paper, which recommended that future expansion of English-medium schools should be through aided schools rather than through government schools. In accordance with the white paper's recommendations, ESF was established in 1967 under the English Schools Foundation Ordinance (Cap. 1117). The foundation's initial two schools were Beacon Hill School and Island School. In 1975, Bradbury School opened as Causeway Bay School on Eastern Hospital Road. In 1977, South Island School started as a nucleus of additional classes to Island School. The school moved to its present campus at Nam Fung Road in 1983.

Following a government review, it was determined that English-language grant-aided schools were no longer viable. These schools were subsequently handed over to ESF. Glenealy School, Kennedy School, Kowloon Junior School, Peak School and Quarry Bay School became ESF schools in 1979, followed by King George V School in 1981.

In 1982, Sha Tin College, with about 50 students and six teaching staff, opened on the premises of KGV School, where it was known as Sha Tin Annexe. The school was renamed Sha Tin College in 1983, and moved to its current location in 1985. In 1988, Sha Tin Junior School opened next to Sha Tin College.

== Schools ==
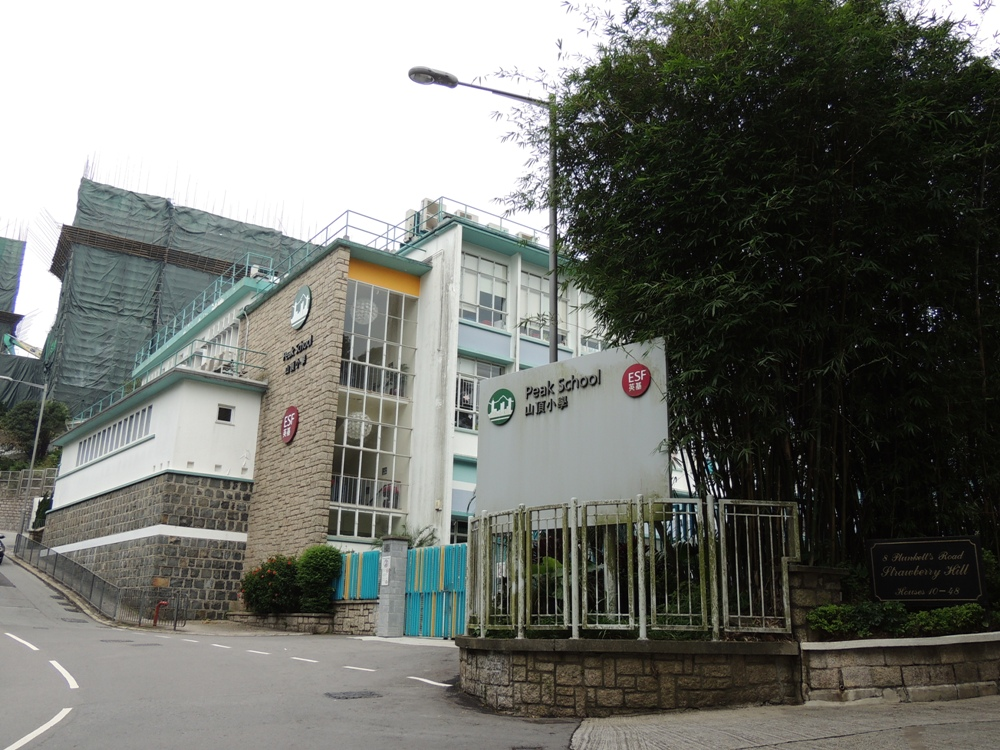
Peak School

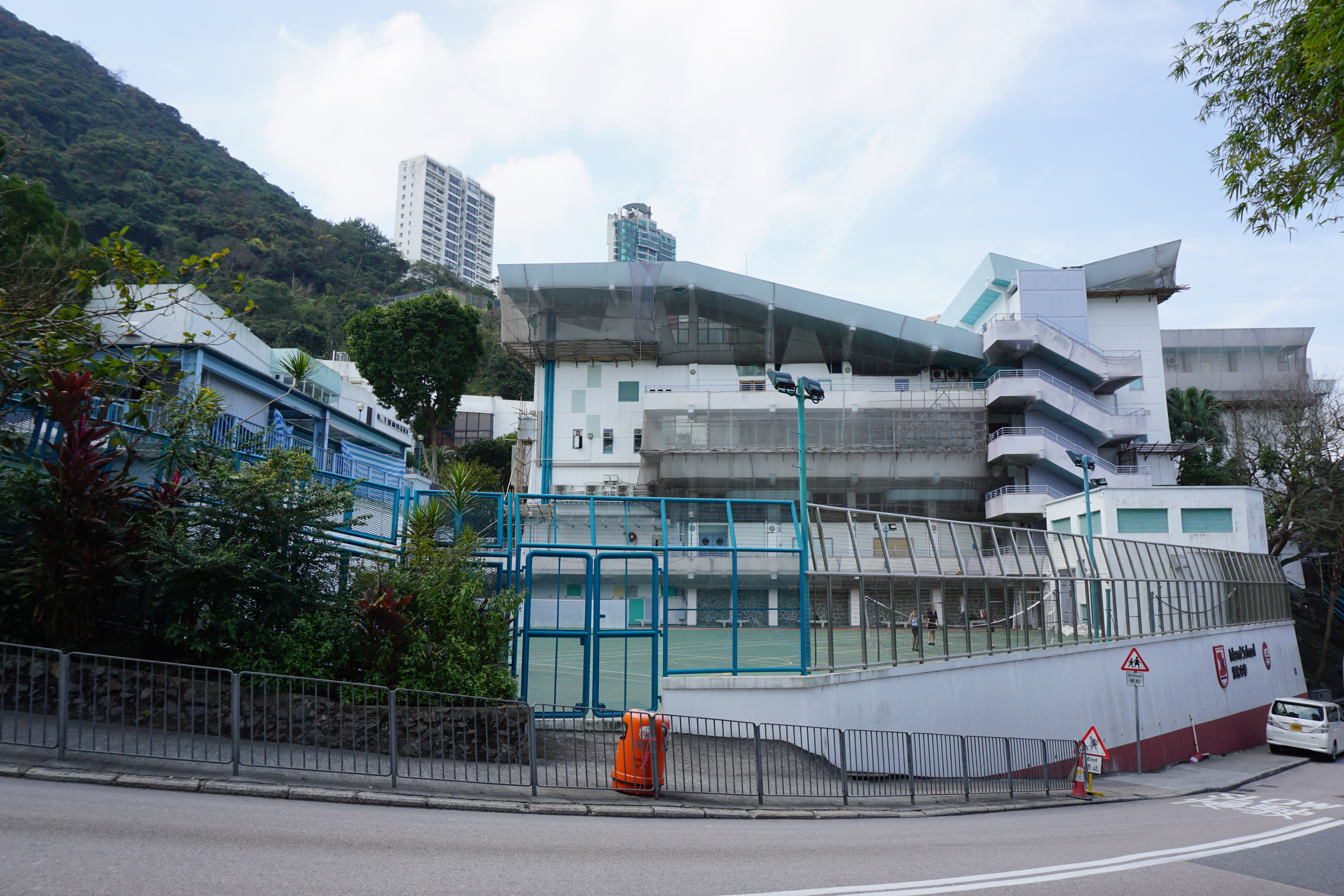
Island School's old Borrett Road campus prior to its demolition

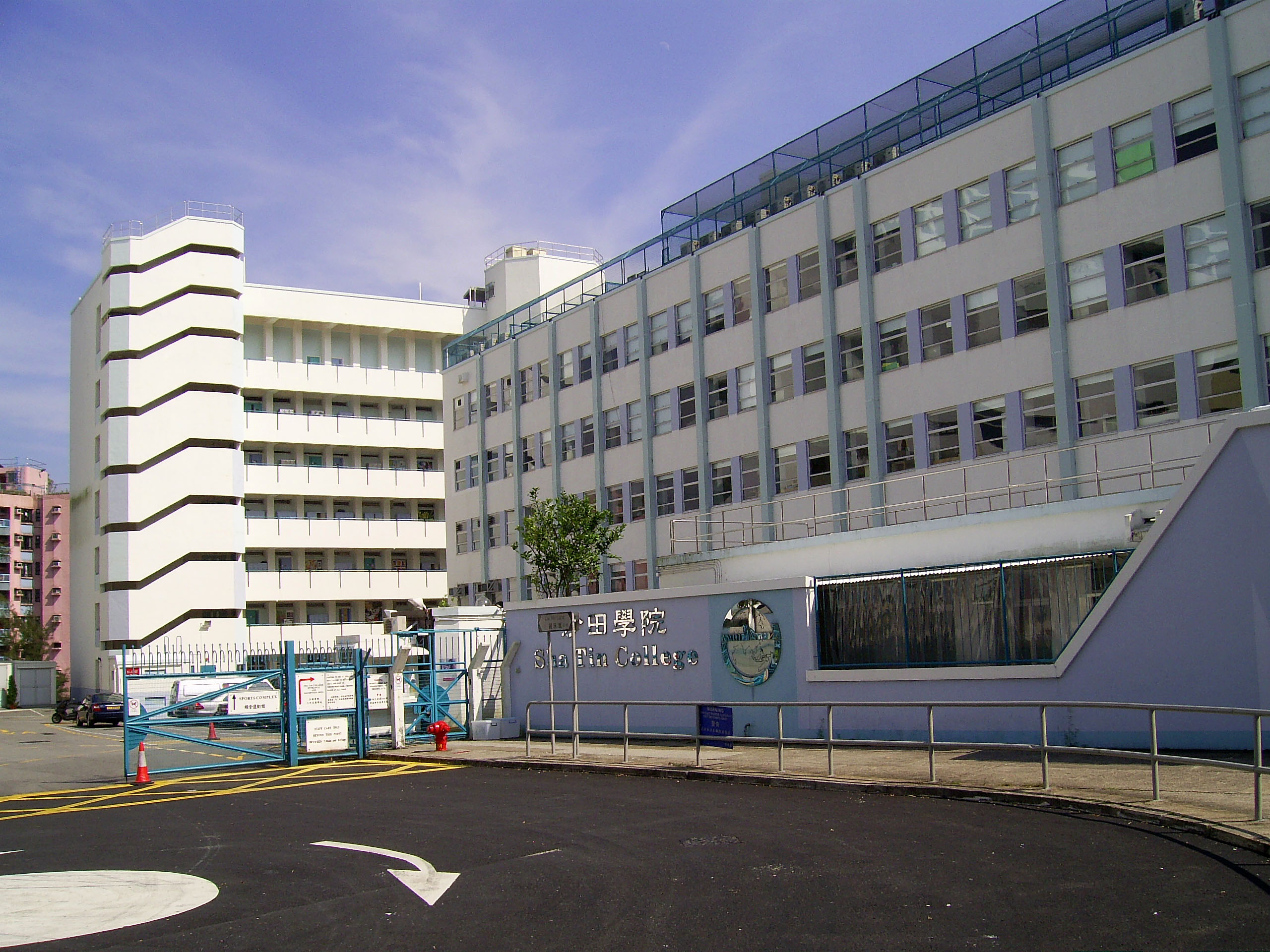
Sha Tin College

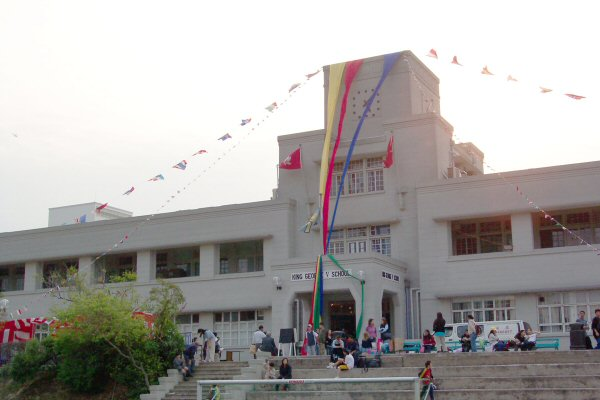
King George V School

Schools that are part of ESF include:

- Discovery College
- Renaissance College
- Island School
- King George V School
- Sha Tin College
- South Island School
- West Island School
- Beacon Hill School
- Bradbury School
- Clearwater Bay School
- Glenealy School
- Jockey Club Sarah Roe School
- Kennedy School
- Kowloon Junior School
- Peak School
- Quarry Bay School
- Sha Tin Junior School
- ESF Abacus International Kindergarten
- ESF Hillside International Kindergarten
- ESF Tsing Yi International Kindergarten
- ESF Wu Kai Sha International Kindergarten
- ESF Tung Chung International Kindergarten

== Admissions ==
Starting from August 2022, ESF has become an all-through educational system. This means that children who join K1 from August 2020 will be guaranteed a place at an ESF primary school, then a secondary school up until Year 13, if they can benefit from a mainstream, English-medium education.

ESF schools are non-selective. However, students must demonstrate sufficient English language skills so that they can benefit from the foundation's English-medium learning environment. Applicants are placed on a waiting list, and will be invited to an interview or assessment when vacancies become available. They will be required to complete age-appropriate assessments to determine if they can engage with an English-medium curriculum.

=== Procedure ===
Each September, children in K1, Year 1 and Year 7 go through a central application procedure in the year before admission. Applications are made online, on the online admission system. The applications are then sorted by priority category, and then each school makes an interview list based on the parent's preferences, availability and Education Bureau requirements. For other applications received throughout the year, they are processed and also placed on the school's waiting list.

Children in kindergarten are assessed based on a play visit in December of each year. The play visit allows the school to observe the children, talk with the parents, and determine if the school is appropriate for the child. For applications to primary and secondary school, students will be invited for an interview and assessment when new places become available. If the student is successful, a place will be offered subject to availability.

Applications to Year 12 for the IB Diploma programme have special requirements: the student must have either achieved or been predicted five grade C's or above, completed the IB Middle Years programme, or completed an equivalent national qualification. Other students will be considered on a case-by-case basis.

Priority consideration is given to children of staff, alumni, elite athletes, and specified visa holders. Priority is also given to siblings of enrolled students, and applicants who have purchased a HK$500,000 nomination right.

ESF has provisions for students that have special educational needs. After SEN students go through the application procedure and are accepted, a moderation team will observe the student, and make recommendations on whether to apply for a learning support place, or a place at the Jockey Club Sarah Roe School.

== Academics ==
Its schools have traditionally provided a curriculum based on the British curriculum, but since 2004 the organisation has transitioned to a more international curriculum from the International Baccalaureate, starting with changing the Year 12 and 13 programme from the British GCE A-Levels to the International Baccalaureate Diploma Programme. As at 2021–22, 21 ESF schools are authorised as International Baccalaureate World Schools, including five kindergartens, nine primary schools, five secondary schools and the two all-through schools.

=== Early years ===
All five of ESF's kindergartens follow the IB Primary Years Programme, designed for students aged between 3 and 5. The curriculum encourages children to learn through inquiry and hands-on experiences. It is focused on early literacy and numeracy, as well as Mandarin Chinese, which is integrated into the curriculum. At Abacus kindergarten, there is a choice between an English stream and a bilingual English–Mandarin stream.

=== Primary education ===
ESF primary schools follow the IB Primary Years Programme, and cater to students from Year 1 to Year 6. The PYP centres on the development of the whole child and provides for children's academic, social, physical, emotional and cultural needs. Students learn the PYP's six transdisciplinary themes, and develop and understanding of concepts, which allows them to make connections both within the subject, and to other subjects. Students are taught using an inquiry-based approach, and are encouraged to be curious and to interact to issues locally and globally. In addition, all students are taught Chinese and the four skills: listening, speaking, reading and writing. They also learn about Chinese culture, and their history and society.

=== Secondary education ===
The curriculum of ESF secondary schools is based on the IB Middle Years Programme between Year 7 and 9. At Years 10 to 11, students follow a curriculum designed by the school, that leads to IGCSE and GCSE qualifications, with the exception of Discovery College and Renaissance college which follow the MYP. At Years 12 and 13, students can either take the IB Diploma programme, or an applied learning pathway such as BTEC or the IB Career-related programme. Students study a range of subjects such as English, mathematics, science, the humanities, creative and performing arts, design technology and an additional language at an appropriate level.

=== Examination results ===
The ESF has received one of its best mean IB Diploma scores among its 969 students graduating in the class of 2021 in its history, at a 38.9 out of a possible 45. Sixty-four of these students received a perfect score of 45, which fewer than 0.01% of IB Diploma students receive.

In May 2021, 1,000 students completed the IGCSE/GCSE programme. For exams using the A*-G system, 40% of students obtained A* and 96% obtained A*-C, and for exams using the 9–1 system, 50% of students obtained a grade 9 or 8, and 97% obtained grades from 9 to 4. This was the fifteenth consecutive year that more than half of students attained either an A or an A* grade.

For Discovery College and Renaissance College which take the IB Middle Years programme, in 2020, the mean grade per subject was 5.7 points, higher than the worldwide average of 4.6 points. The mean number of total points per student was 52.2 points out of a maximum possible score of 63 points.

== Student demographics ==
The ethnic groups of the foundations' students include local residents of Hong Kong, Europeans and other nearby regional countries. As of 2016 the students came from over 60 countries; the ESF schools, except kindergartens, are required to have at least 70% of their students hold foreign passports.

As of 2017, ESF had a total of 17,700 students, of whom 70% had parents who were permanent residents of Hong Kong. The total number of students in 2013 was 13,000, and the same percentage had permanent resident parents.

== Governance ==
The ESF Board of Governors manages ESF's affairs and maintains its educational standards. Its main responsibilities include working with the chief executive officer to establish the foundation's strategic direction, review the overall curriculum strategy for all schools, and ensure the efficient use of resources.

Every ESF school has a school council. The school councils' main responsibilities are to work with the principal to establish the strategic direction for the school; to approve the school's curriculum that aligns with the curriculum strategy approved by the Board of Governors; and to approve the allocation of the school’s annual budget.

ESF was established by government ordinance in 1967. There were no amendments to the ordinance until March 2008, when an amendment to the ESF Ordinance was passed by the Legislative Council.

In response to shortcomings in governance that were highlighted by the Legislative Council in January 2005, the ESF carried out an extensive consultation process to produce an amended ordinance, which provide for a number of changes to the governance and management of ESF. Some of these are in response to the shortcomings identified by the Public Accounts Committee. The most substantial changes were to the structure and composition of ESF's governing body and committees, including the creation of a new Board of Governors to replace the Foundation.

== Government subsidy debate ==
Unlike most other international schools in Hong Kong, schools run by the ESF receive an ongoing subsidy (called a 'subvention') from the Hong Kong Government. The reason for this is historical and lies in the foundation's statutory basis. Before the handover of 1997, it was generally accepted that this subsidy was fair and that the foundation had a reason to be subsidised.

There has been controversy regarding subsidies to the foundation. The fiscal deficit suffered by the Hong Kong Government following the Asian financial crisis forced the government to cut costs. There were also allegations that the foundation has misused funds on entertainment and over-extravagant recruitment procedures. A report criticising the ESF's use of funds was published by the Hong Kong Government in November 2002, resulting in a continuing debate about whether the subsidy should be cut or even suspended. The subvention was cut for several years in line with a general reduction in government expenditure and then frozen.

The ESF has recently addressed concerns about governance by putting forward a new ordinance that will change the way the organisation operates. The foundation imposed a refundable capital levy of HK$25,000 per student in 2011.

The changes culminate in the phasing out of government's annual subsidy (worth HK$283 million) with effect from 2016, tapering to zero in 2028–29. After a comprehensive internal review of financing needs, the foundation decided to introduce one-off non-refundable levy starting in the 2015/16 school year. The will be set at HK$38,000 for first-year students, with lesser amount for those joining higher age groups – HK$3,800 will be charged for Year 13 entrants. The ESF expects to raise an extra HK$50 million every year through the levy, for the replacement of schools.

In 2023/24 government subvention comprised 5% of ESF's operating income. Tuition fees made up 80% while the balance was generated through interest income, renting out property, and other minor sources of income.

== Controversies ==
The ESF was involved in the controversial 2015 Hong Kong heavy metal in drinking water incidents.

Amid the scandal in September 2015, ESF tested the water in its schools, collecting over 300 samples. Four ESF schools were found to have a high amount of lead in their water supplies. The news was announced through the ESF newsletter. It stated that one sample found in each of King George V School, Sha Tin College, South Island School and West Island School was found to have a higher amount of lead than the government's guidelines, and that all the other schools had water that passed the inspection.

The newsletter did not specify where the source of the water containing high lead were in those schools. The individual schools have halted the use of those water sources pending an investigation.

== See also ==
- List of English Schools Foundation schools
- EMI schools
- Education in Hong Kong
