= West Island School =

Secondary school in Hong Kong

Coordinates: 22°16′21″N 114°07′32″E

West Island School

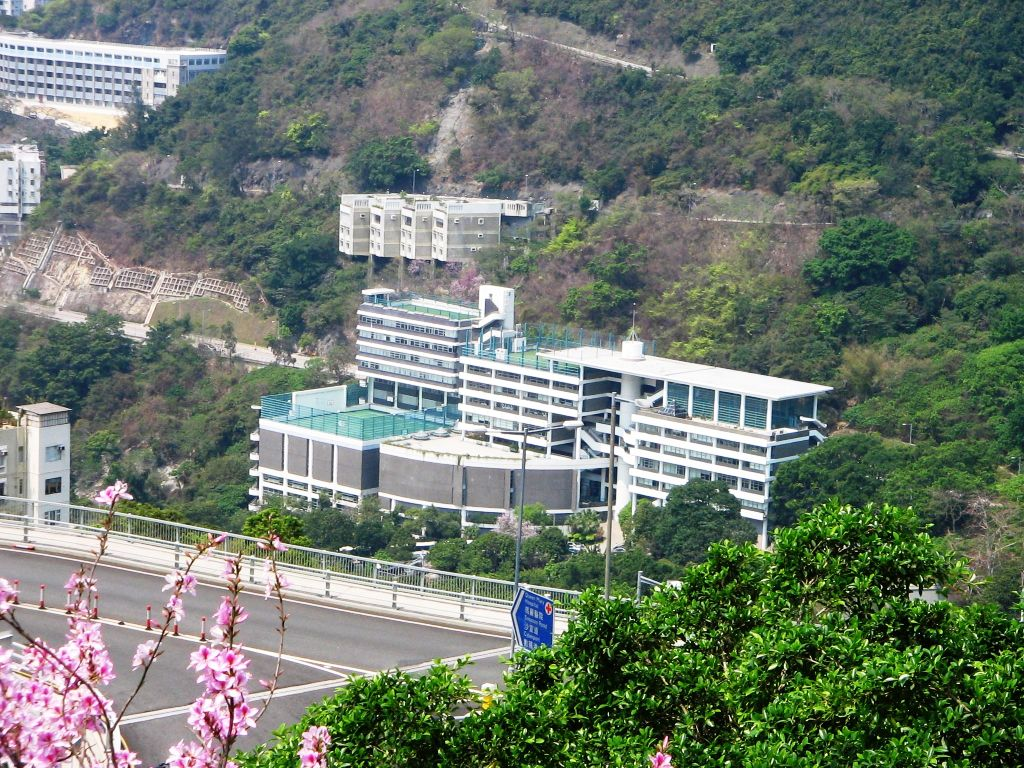
- West Island School as viewed from Queen Mary Hospital on Pok Fu Lam Road
- 250 Victoria Road; Pokfulam; Hong Kong

Information
- Type: Private, international, secondary, co-educational, English Schools Foundation
- Motto: Strength from Diversity
- Established: 1991
- Years: Seven to Thirteen
- Enrolment: 1,200
- Language: English
- Houses: Tang, Yuan, Song, Ming, Qing, Han
- Colours: navy blue, beige
- Yearbook: WISDOM
- Website: www.wis.edu.hk

West Island School
- Traditional Chinese: 西島中學
- Simplified Chinese: 西岛中学
Transcriptions
Standard Mandarin
- Hanyu Pinyin: Xī Dǎo Zhōngxué
Yue: Cantonese
- Yale Romanization: Sāi dóu jūng hohk
- Jyutping: Sai1 dou2 zung1 hok6

West Island School (WIS; Chinese: 西島中學) is an English-language co-educational, private, international secondary school in Hong Kong to students from age eleven to eighteen with a "modern liberal education" based on British-influenced international curricula. The campus is a purpose-built development located at 250 Victoria Road, Pokfulam, on the slopes of Mount Davis on Hong Kong Island. Students from Years Seven to Nine study the West Island School Middle Years Diploma; students in Years Ten to Eleven follow either the IGCSE, or the MYP IB Middle Years Programme; and students in Years Twelve to Thirteen follow the IB Diploma curricula. The school is a member of the English Schools Foundation, and as such still receives a small but symbolic subvention from the Government that has been frozen since the 1997 Handover of Hong Kong.

== History ==
West Island School, began when the English Schools Foundation recognised a need for a new school on Hong Kong Island in the late-1980s; after Island School and South Island School. This was because of the recent residential boom in Discovery Bay, which then had no secondary school to cater for the growing need of English language secondary school education on the outlying islands. After government approval of a site and funding in November 1990, plans for West Island School began in earnest, with the school operating as an offshoot of Island School at a temporary home; the old military hospital in Borrett Road, Mid-Levels.

West Island's first intake was in September 1991, when eighty-four Year 7 students were enrolled in four classes. In the meantime, work progressed on a purpose-built school in Pokfulam, designed by award-winning architect Patrick Lau, who was responsible for two other international schools in Hong Kong, the Lycée Français International Victor Segalen in Tai Hang and the American Hong Kong International School in Tai Tam.

In September 1994, the new purpose-built building opened. This consisted of a ten-storey building consisting of three blocks: housing classrooms, laboratories, an auditorium and a 25-metre indoor pool, linked together by open-air walkways and air-conditioned faculty-corridors.

Over the years, renovations further increased the usability of the building, although by 2001 the school was getting rather crowded with over 1,000 students enrolled; paving the way for the creation of a fourth block. This new addition opened for use in September 2003.

== Curriculum ==
The school offers secondary education from Years 7 to 13, for pupils aged 10–19. West Island School students follow the International General Certificate of Secondary Education program in Years 10-11 and pursue the IB Diploma and BTEC Extended Diploma in Years 12–13.

The grades achieved by West Island students in IGCSE and IB examinations place them generously above similar schools across the world. In 2011, around 60% of IGCSE passes were at A* or A.

West Island also offers extracurricular activities run by both staff and students. Furthermore, students also have the opportunity to compete with other teams from other international schools as well as local schools from across Hong Kong and the region.

West Island School also participates in sports, with the school's track, swimming, field hockey, volleyball, martial arts, and netball teams placing well in HKSSF rankings. West Island School's football team has participated in 4 HKSSF finals in the last 5 years, and won three gold medals. In 2011, the school won the BOCHK Bauhinia Bowl, as the highest ranked co-educational school in Hong Kong.

== School Council ==
WIS is a member school of the English Schools Foundation. WIS is governed by the "School Council" composed of teachers, parents, and management staff.

== See also ==
- English Schools Foundation
- Island School
- South Island School
