= Beacon Hill School, Hong Kong =

Beacon Hill School
- 畢架山小學
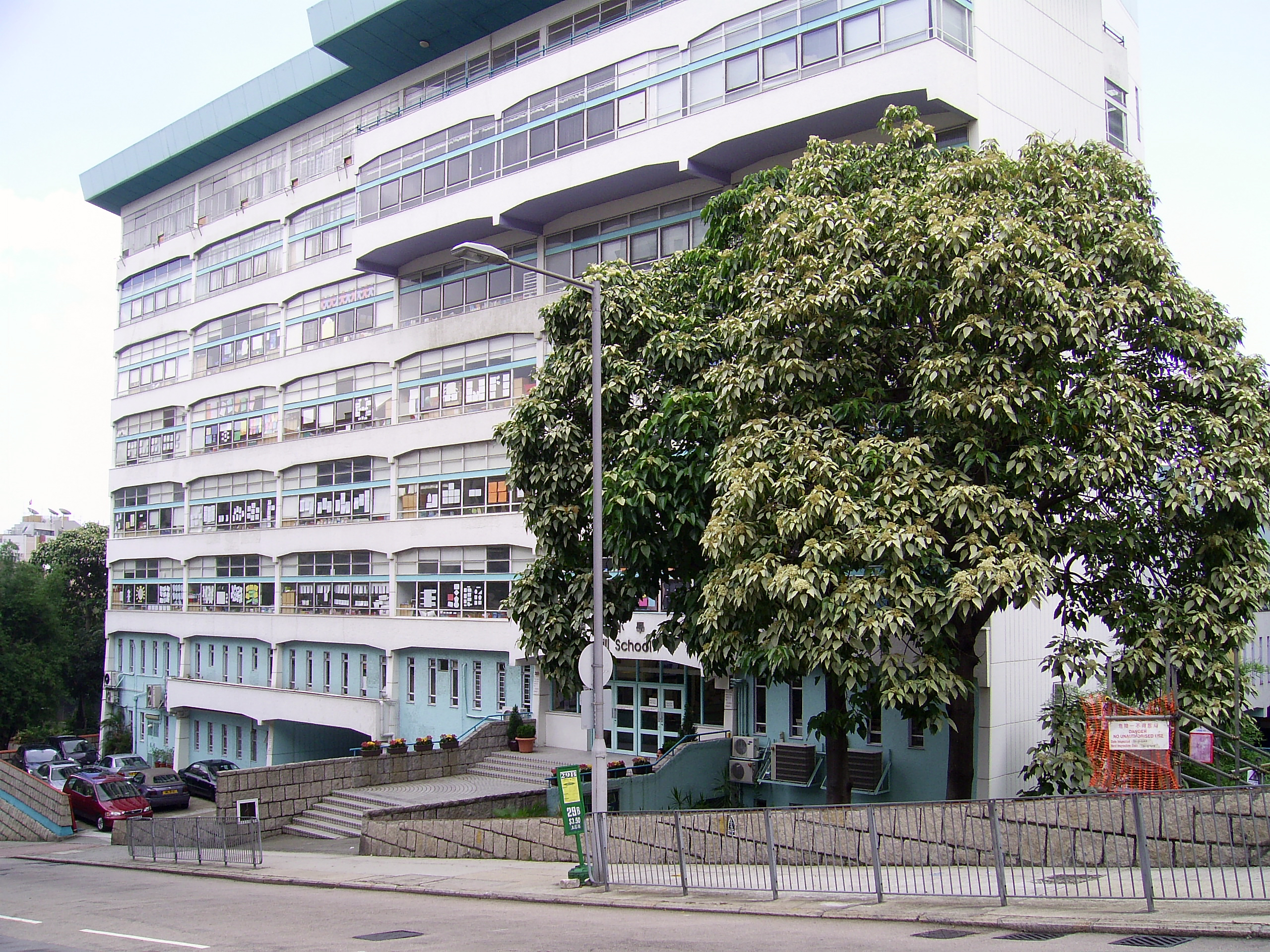
- The exterior of BHS

Location
- 23 Ede Rd, Kowloon Tong; Hong Kong
- Coordinates: 22°20′32″N 114°10′41″E

Information
- Type: Private
- Established: 1967
- Principal: Dr. Jamie Schmitz
- Grades: 1–6
- Enrollment: 540
- Language: English
- Color: Purple
- Website: www.beaconhill.esf.edu.hk

Beacon Hill School (Chinese: 畢架山小學; Jyutping: Baat1 Gaa3 Saan1 Siu2 Hok6; pinyin: Bìjiàshān xiǎoxué) is a co-educational primary school in Kowloon Tong, Hong Kong. The school is one of 22 institutions in Hong Kong operated by the English Schools Foundation (ESF).

BHS teaches students from Year One to Year Six in three classes in each year band, of around thirty students in each class, and offers the International Baccalaureate programme. The principal is Jamie Schmitz.

== History ==
BHS was established in 1966 temporarily in the Tin Kwong Road Police School in Ho Man Tin. In 1967, it and Island School became founding members of the English Schools Foundation. After formal establishment that year, it was built seven stories high on its current site in Kowloon Tong.

== Accreditations and authorizations ==
BHS is accredited of the International Baccalaureate Primary Years Program.

== Notable alumni ==
- Perry So, Hong Kong conductor
- Rowan Varty, Hong Kong international rugby union player
- Vivian Kong, Hong Kong professional fencer, Olympic medalist, and politician
- Michael Hutchence, co-founder, lead singer and lyricist of the rock band INXS
