= Peak School =

- 山頂小學
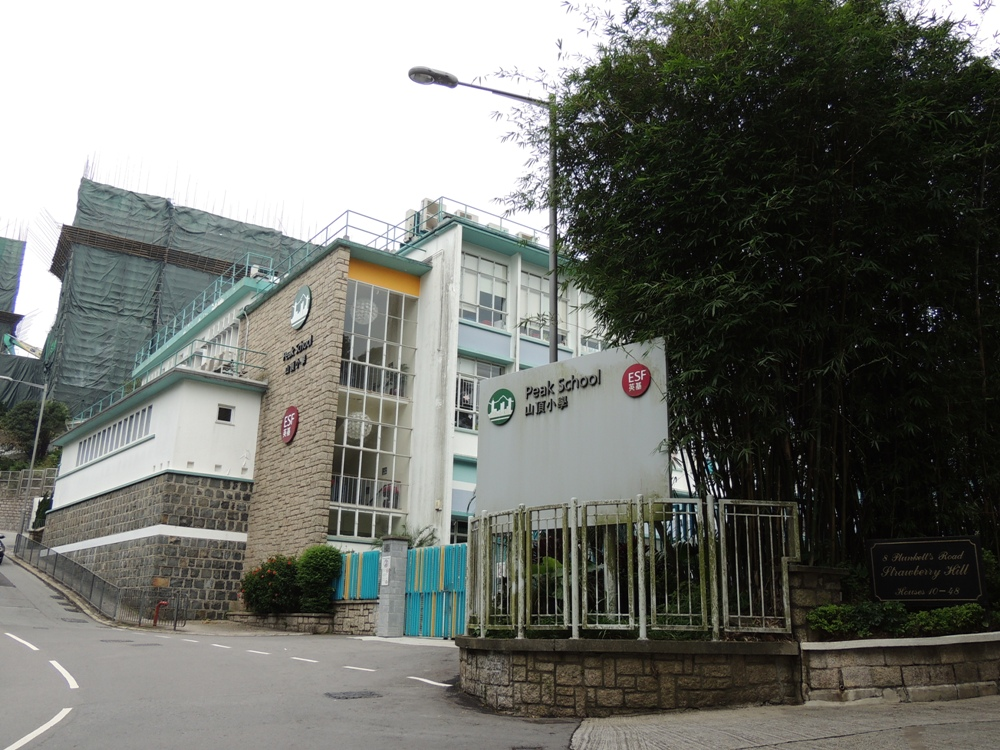
- Main gate of Peak School

Location
- 20 Plunkett's Rd, The Peak; Hong Kong; 22°16′2″N 114°9′10″E

Information
- Type: Private
- Established: 1911
- Principal: Bill Garnett
- Grades: 1–6
- Enrollment: 360
- Language: English
- Website: www.ps.esf.edu.hk

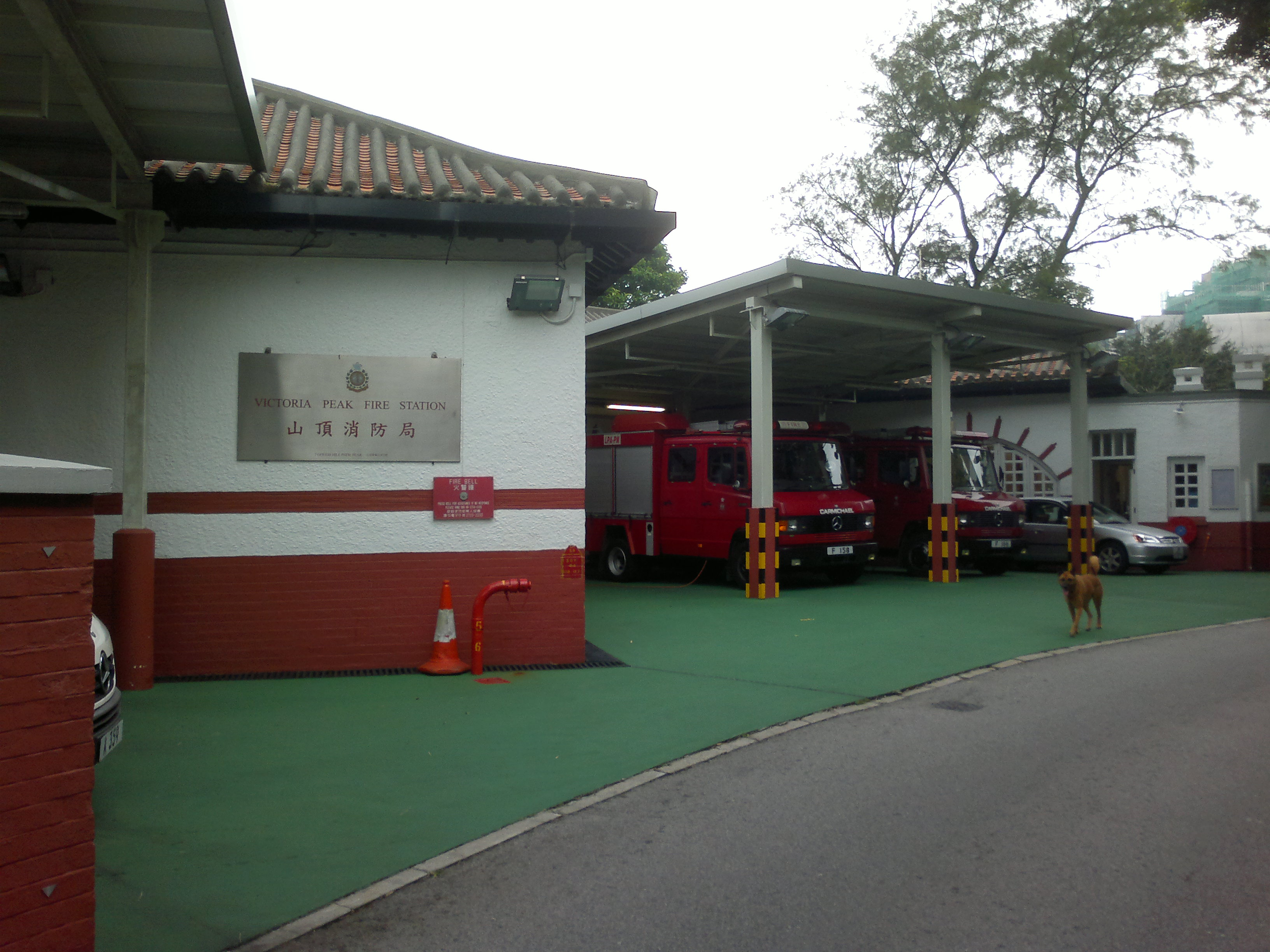
Former Peak School at No. 7, Gough Hill Path, Victoria Peak, now housing the Victoria Peak Fire Station.

Peak School (Chinese: 山頂小學; Jyutping: Saan1 Deng2 Siu2 Hok6; pinyin: Shāndǐng xiǎoxué) is a coeducational preparatory school, located on Plunkett's Road on Victoria Peak, Hong Kong Island, Hong Kong. The school is one of around twenty institutions in Hong Kong operated by the English Schools Foundation (ESF).

Peak School teaches students from Year One to Year Six, and offers the International Baccalaureate programme. The principal of Peak School is Bill Garnett.

== History ==
The school opened in 1911. Its first school building was built by the Public Works Department in 1915 at No.7 Gough Hill Path (歌賦山里). The building now houses the Victoria Peak Fire Station (山頂消防局). Construction of the current premises on Plunkett's Road was completed in 1954. The two campuses were initially operated in tandem, with younger children attending the older school. A few years later, the entire student body was consolidated in the new buildings.

== Conservation ==
The Former Peak School at No. 7 Gough Hill Path has been listed as a Grade II historic building since 2009, while the Peak School at Plunkett's Road has been listed as a Grade III historic building since 2010.

== Accreditations and authorizations ==
The Peak School is accredited, authorized, or a member of the following organizations:

- Western Association of Schools and Colleges (WASC)
- Council of International Schools (CIS)
- The International Baccalaureate Primary Years Program

== Notable alumni ==
- William Anders, US astronaut
- Martin Booth, British novelist and poet
- Marie-Chantal, Crown Princess of Greece, Greek and Danish princess
- Hamish Harding, British explorer
- Sara Jane Ho, etiquette teacher
- Eleanor Sanger, American sports producer
- Hannah Wilson, Hong Kong swimmer
- Sir Denis Wright, British diplomat
