= Sha Tin College =

Hong Kong secondary school

- 沙田學院
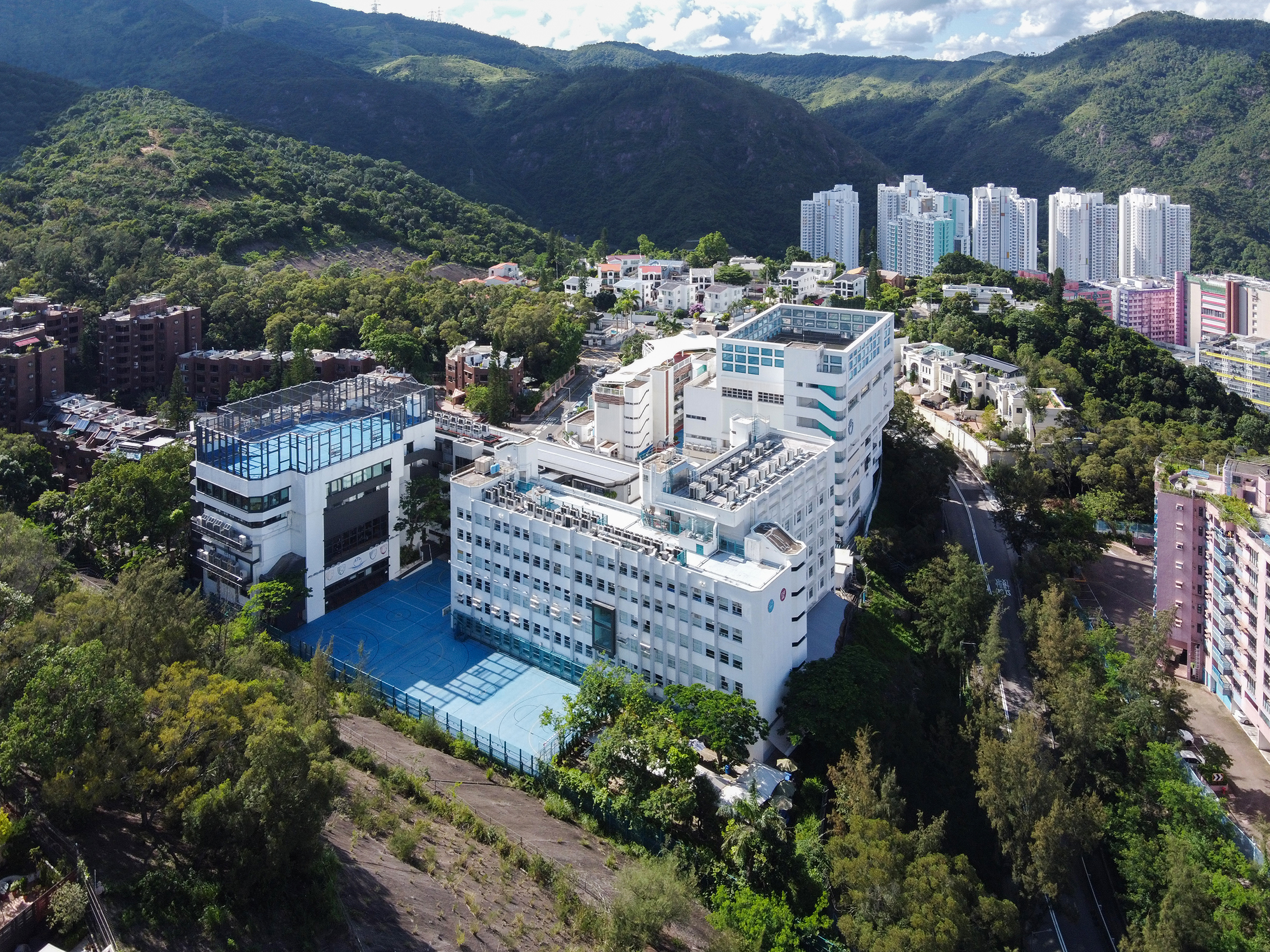

Location
- 3 Lai Wo Lane, Sui Wo Road; Fo Tan, Sha Tin; Hong Kong; 22°23′34″N 114°11′18″E

Information
- Type: Private, comprehensive, secondary, co-educational
- Motto: Ours is a culture where we take responsibility for fulfilling our own potential and that of others for the good of humanity at all levels.
- Established: 1982
- Principal: Carol Larkin (2017– )
- Years: 7 to 13
- Enrolment: 1,170 (September 2016)
- Colours: White, light blue, navy blue
- Feeder schools: Sha Tin Junior School
- Website: shatincollege.edu.hk

Sha Tin College
- Traditional Chinese: 沙田學院
- Simplified Chinese: 沙田学院
Transcriptions
Standard Mandarin
- Hanyu Pinyin: Shātián Xuéyuàn
Yue: Cantonese
- Yale Romanization: Sā tìhn hohk yuhn
- Jyutping: Saa1 tin4 hok6 jyun6

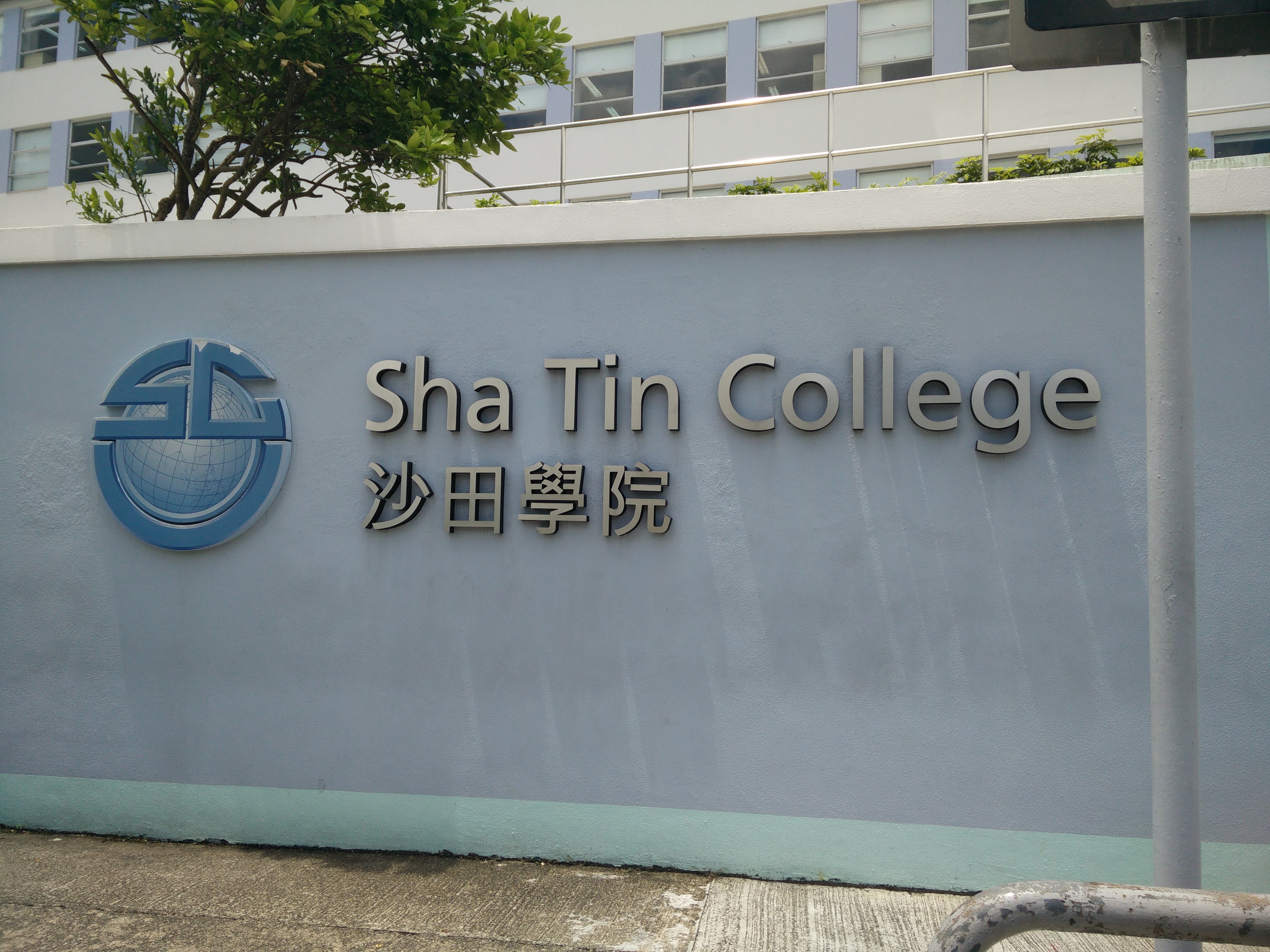
The sign at the entrance of Sha Tin College on Lai Wo Lane

Sha Tin College (STC) is a co-educational international secondary school in Hong Kong and a member of the English Schools Foundation.

Established in 1982 as the Shatin Annexe based in the campus of KGV School in Kowloon Tong, the school relocated to 3 Lai Wo Lane, Fo Tan, in 1985, adopting its present name.

== Students ==
For the 2020–2021 school year, the school had 1389 students. In 2020, 65.8 percent of students were Chinese, a total of 894 students. The next largest group was Eurasians, then Caucasians.

== Curriculum ==
=== Middle school ===
The middle school curriculum is designed for Years 7 to 9. The middle school follows the International Baccalaureate Middle Years Programme (MYP).

=== IGCSE ===
Students in Years 10 and 11 follow the IGCSE curriculum. Some subjects are compulsory, such as English, mathematics, and sciences.

=== IB Diploma ===
Year 12–13 students have the option to choose between the IBDP and the IBCP (International Baccalaureate Career-related Programme).

== Academics ==
Sha Tin College's IBDP program achieved a 40–40 status (where over 40% of students achieve 40 points or above). In 2021, 13 students received achieved full scores for their IB diplomas.

In 2017, one student at the college achieved the world's highest IGCSE maths score. In 2022, a student received the world's highest IGCSE History score. Two other students were each awarded the world's highest IGCSE mark in Psychology and Geography respectively. In 2023, three students received achieved outstanding awards from their examinations. One student gained the highest mark in the world for IGCSE Textile Design.

== Facilities ==
The school's campus consists of art, drama, music, film, design and computer science studios, science and food technology laboratories, a comprehensive suite of subject-based classrooms, an exhibition and multi-purpose space, a school hall, a library and learning centre, seminar rooms, middle and senior school centres, a canteen, and a cafe.

Sha Tin College's Sports Complex comprises an indoor swimming pool, two sports gymnasiums, a climbing wall and a bouldering wall, a fitness studio, outdoor basketball courts, a rooftop basketball court, and a rooftop pitch.

== Notable alumni ==
- Dawen – Singer-songwriter
- Stephanie Ho – Singer, actress and golfer
- Vivian Kong – Professional Olympic fencer, Women’s Épée Olympic Gold Medalist (2024)
- Kaylin Hsieh – Professional Olympic fencer
- Chu Ka Mong (Moonie Chu) - Professional Olympic fencer
- Wesley Wong – Actor

== As a filming location ==
Because of the school's location in the Hills as well as for logistical reasons, Sha Tin College has been a filming location for several TV shows and movies, including Fight Back to School.

== See also ==
- English Schools Foundation
- List of secondary schools in Hong Kong
