= Renaissance College =

- 啓新書院

Location
- 5 Hang Ming Street, Ma On Shan; Sha Tin; Hong Kong; 22.418°N 114.225°E

Information
- Other name: RCHK
- Type: Private international school
- Motto: To seek, to serve, to strive
- Established: 26 August 2006; 20 years ago
- Oversight: English Schools Foundation
- Principal: Harry Brown
- Head of Secondary: Geoff Wheeler
- Head of Primary: Jason Doucette
- Education system: International Baccalaureate (IB)
- Colours: Black, orange, white
- Teams: Black Kites
- Website: www.rchk.edu.hk
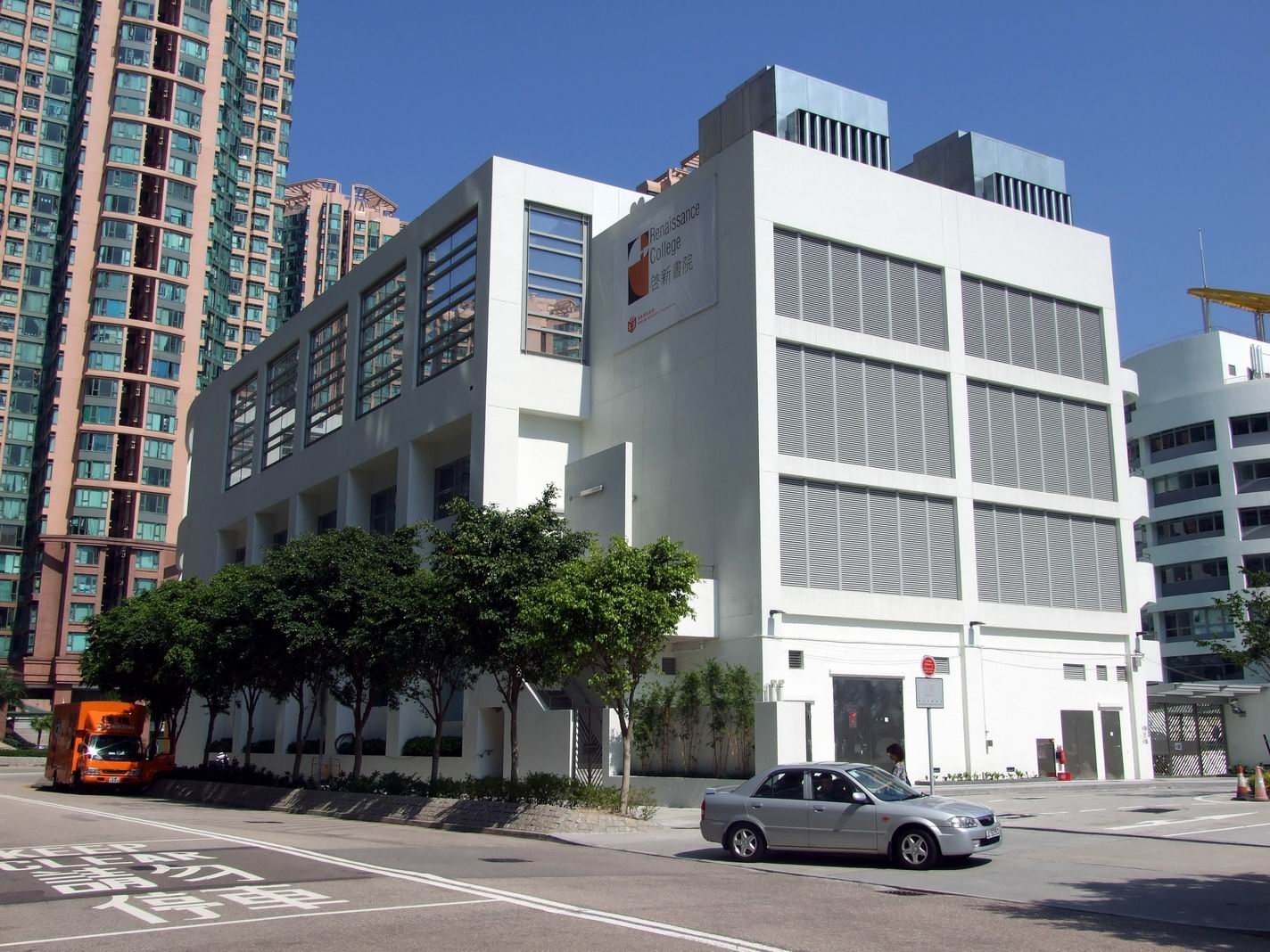
- An entrance to the school on Hang Ming Street
- Last updated: 23 June 2024

Renaissance College (/rɪˌnəɪsənsˈkɒlɪdʒ/ ; Chinese: 啓新書院, abbreviated: RCHK) is a private international school run by English Schools Foundation (ESF) in Ma On Shan, Hong Kong. It serves primary and secondary students, and it also added a new kindergarten at 2026 called Renaissance College Kindergarten (RCK). It was founded in 2006 to replace the Phoenix International School, another school run by ESF. Since its inception, the school has offered the International Baccalaureate curriculum.

== History ==
Plans to establish Renaissance College as ESF's first private school began in 1999. Unlike other schools operated by ESF at the time, Renaissance College would not receive recurrent government subsidy.

In 2001, the Education Department granted ESF land in Ma On Shan and in Discovery Bay to build two schools that each provide primary and secondary education under the non-profit Private Independent School Scheme, which do not receive recurrent government grants. The Ma On Shan site would eventually become the campus of Renaissance College.

On 29 October 2001, Canadian Overseas International College closed unexpectedly due to financial difficulties. According to the school's chancellor, the September 11 attacks forced the company that funded the school to file for bankruptcy. The Education Department was unaware of the financial difficulties that Canadian Overseas International College was facing, and was only informed by the school one day before its closure. The police investigated possible fraud at the school, after complaints from some parents. Jonathan Goodman, the supervisor of the Canadian school, was arrested in December 2001 for suspected theft but was not charged.

The closure of the Canadian Overseas International College made 380 students unable to attend school. To resume tuition for the affected students, the Education Department established Phoenix International School (PIS) in 2001 as a temporary school operated by ESF. PIS occupied the former campus of Australian International School in Cheung Sha Wan and adopted the Ontario curriculum (OSSD).

The campus in Ma On Shan cost HK$297 million to build, of which HK$191.6 million was funded by the Hong Kong Government. Phoenix International School merged with Renaissance College after the latter began operating in August 2006. The first cohort of Renaissance College had 900 primary and secondary students, of which 340 were transferred from Phoenix International School.

== Curriculum ==
The Black Kites are RCHK's athletics team.

RCHK offers the IB Primary Years, Middle Years and Diploma programmes since its inception. It was granted the status of IB World School in 2007. In 2014, the school began to offer the IB Career-related Programme and became the first school in East Asia, and the eighth school globally, to offer all four IB programmes.

Teaching has relied on technology since the school's opening in 2006. In 2007, RCHK spent HK$60,000 to 80,000 to provide Apple products for pupils and staff, including one laptop for each student.

== Enrolment ==
In the 2022–23 school year, Renaissance College enroled 2,070 students age five to 19. Under the Private Independent School Scheme, at least 70% of the students of Renaissance College must be Hong Kong permanent residents at full capacity. In 2022, 69% of students were Chinese nationals, followed by British and Canadian nationals.
