= Quarry Bay School =

Coordinates: 22.2843°N 114.1983°E

- 6 Hau Yuen Path; Braemar Hill, North Point, Hong Kong

Information
- Type: Private, international, primary, co-educational.
- Motto: Labore et Honore (By work and honour)
- Established: c.1926
- Principal: Ms. Sue Yee
- Enrollment: approx. 720
- Years: 1 - 6
- Website: qbs.edu.hk

Quarry Bay School
- Traditional Chinese: 鰂魚涌小學
- Simplified Chinese: 鲗鱼涌小学
- Cantonese Yale: jāk yùh chūng síu hohk
Transcriptions
Standard Mandarin
- Hanyu Pinyin: Zéiyúchōng Xiǎoxué
Yue: Cantonese
- Yale Romanization: jāk yùh chūng síu hohk
- Jyutping: zak1 jyu4 cung1 siu2 hok6

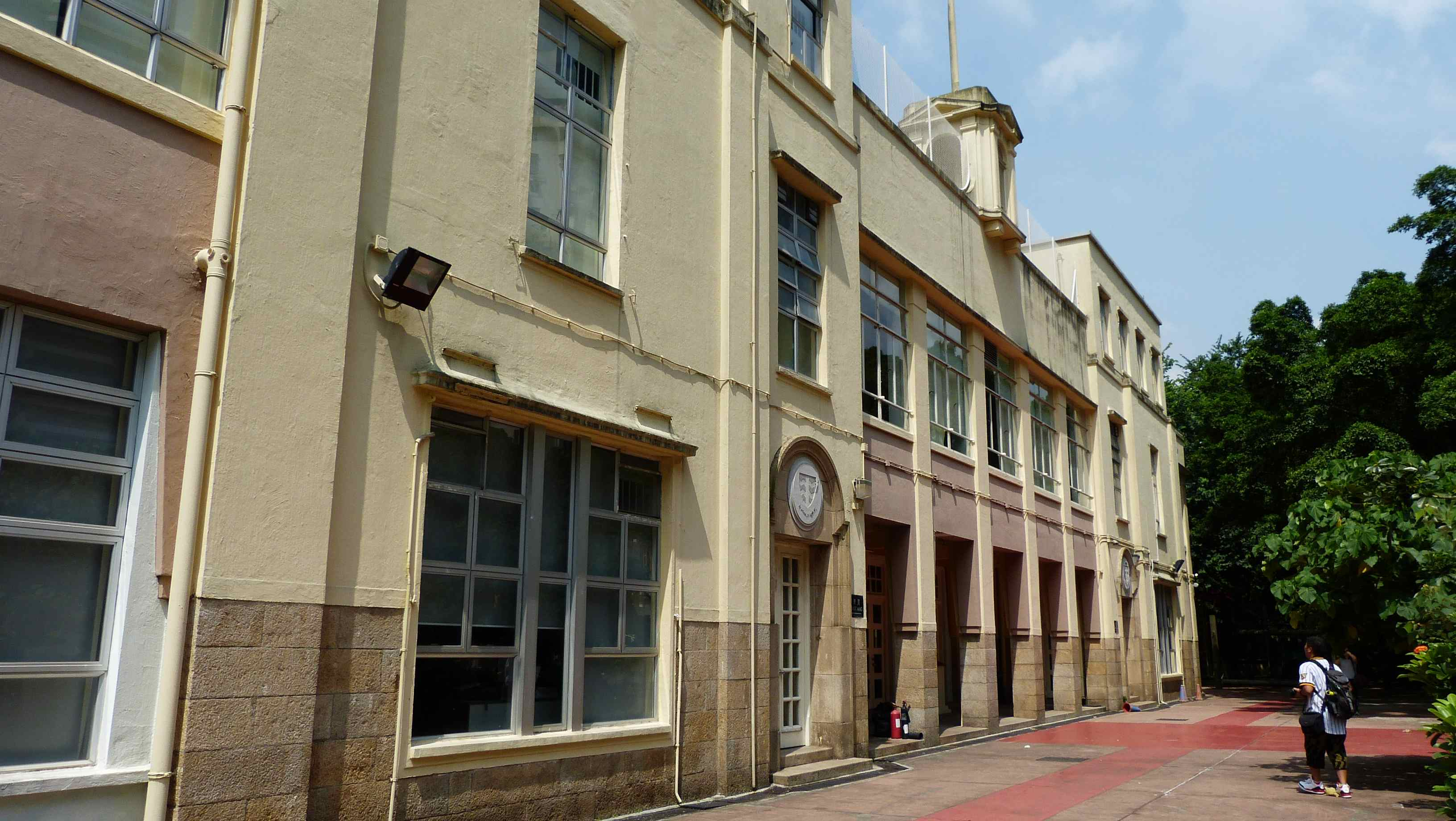
Former Quarry Bay School

Quarry Bay School is the oldest English Schools Foundation primary school in Hong Kong. There are around 720 students. Its campus is on Braemar Hill on Hong Kong Island.

== History ==
The juvenile hall was opened in 1926 to educate the children of expatriate dockyard workers. It remained at 986 King's Road, Quarry Bay until the 1970s. The school was briefly interrupted by the Second World War, which it was forced to operate in the Stanley Internment Camp. In 1980 it relocated to temporary premises in Victoria Barracks, and then in 1984 to its current location on Braemar Hill.

A time capsule filled with children's work, messages and other items was buried in its gardens during the academic year of 1996-97 and still remains under the ground near the terrapin pond to be exhumed in 2027 to commemorate the 30th Anniversary of the Handover of Hong Kong.

== Conservation ==
The former building of Quarry Bay School, located at No. 986 King's Road, in Quarry Bay, has been listed as a Grade III historic building since 2010.
