= Island School =

International school in Hong Kong

- 港島中學
- 20 Borrett Road, Mid-Levels, Hong Kong

Information
- Type: Private, secondary, co-educational, comprehensive, international
- Motto: Celebrates Individuality, Pursues Excellence, Embraces Responsibility
- Established: 1967; 59 years ago
- Principal: Nina Gunson
- Faculty: 20
- Enrollment: Over 1,300
- Houses: Da Vinci, Einstein, Fleming, Nansen, Rutherford, Wilberforce
- Student Union/Association: Island School Student Council
- Colours: Red, white and blue
- Teams: Island School Typhoons
- Yearbook: The Islander
- Years: Year 7–13
- Alumni: Old Islanders
- Website: http://www.island.edu.hk/

Island School
- Traditional Chinese: 港島中學
- Simplified Chinese: 港岛中学
Transcriptions
Standard Mandarin
- Hanyu Pinyin: gǎng dǎo zhōng xué
Yue: Cantonese
- Jyutping: gong2 dou2 zung1 hok6

Island School (Chinese: 港島中學) is a co-educational international school located on the Mid-levels, Hong Kong. Established in 1967, it is a founding member of the English Schools Foundation. The school has been accredited by international organisations such as the Council of International Schools and the Western Association of Schools and Colleges. The school currently houses over 1,300 students across 33 nationalities.

The school has relocated itself twice since its establishment. Using the site of a former British military hospital from 1967 to 1972, the school permanently settled in 20 Borrett Road, Mid-Levels from 1972 to 2017. However, due to redevelopment work, the school temporarily moved to two campuses in Sha Tin District in December 2017. The school has since returned to 20 Borrett Road as of August 2022 after 4 years of redevelopment work.

Island School is a registered IB World School and offers the IB diploma program along with an alternative BTEC program in the senior years. Island School also offers the IGCSE in Years 10-11.

== History ==
The school opened in 1967 to meet increasing demand for schooling for the children of expatriates living in Hong Kong. As there were no secondary schools for English speaking children on Hong Kong Island, the Hong Kong government established the English Schools Foundation (ESF) in 1965 to provide additional schools for expatriate British children. Island School was the first ESF secondary school, adopting the Chinese name of 英童中學 (jing1 tung4 zung1 hok6, lit. "secondary school for British children"). It was located in a former British military hospital from 1967-72 until it permanently settled in 20 Borrett Road, Mid-Levels from 1972-2017.

The first principal of Island School was the Reverend Geoffrey Speak who was appointed from St Paul's College in 1967. Rev. Speak, a graduate of Selwyn College, Cambridge, combined the principalship with managing the ESF between 1967 and 1971, during a rather inauspicious time. In 1967 the Cultural Revolution was in its throes with bombs detonated in Central, water was rationed to four hours every fourth day and with Prime Minister Wilson's devaluation the prospect of working in Hong Kong became less financially appealing. The Rev. Speak will be remembered at Island School for his introduction of the "House System" as the basis of pastoral care and for teaching, a system which is still in place today, and as a pioneer of extracurricular activities.

In 1971 C. Ronald Rivers-Moore was appointed to succeed Rev. Speak as principal. Rivers-Moore, a Cambridge graduate, continued Rev. Speak's vision both in academic policy and through the continuation of the extracurricular program. The introduction of the Nepal Trek, the School Camp, a school zoo and the Student Union are examples of his commitment to that vision. Chris Forse, former Deputy Head and Island School Historian, referred to Rivers-Moore as a man who combined his "integrity with liberal benevolence in roughly equal proportions".

Succeeding Rivers-Moore in 1978 was Charles Jonathan Driver (commonly known as "Jonty Driver"), a graduate of Trinity College, Oxford. Driver had been the President of the National Union of Students in South Africa and had been detained by Police in this role for his opposition to apartheid. Driver extended the Island School curriculum to include Drama, Photography and Computing and a pastoral curriculum. A believer in community education, Driver founded the Island School Evening Institute which provided adult education to parents and friends of the Island School community. It was also during Driver's tenure that Island School's lasting student periodical, "The Islet", was established, succeeding the original student newspaper "The Echo". Driver left Island School in 1983. He later published a book about his experiences, at Island School and others, under the title Some Schools.

Dr. Colin Niven, a graduate of Gonville and Caius College, Cambridge and Brasenose College, Oxford, was principal of Island School between 1983–1988.

David James became the school's first internally appointed principal in 1988. Mr. James was an innovator, introducing the new National Curriculum for England, vocational education and the decision to begin the International Baccalaureate at 16–18. He enhanced the responsibilities of the Sixth Form enabling "students to become surrogate teachers and leaders of the school". He broadened the profile of Island School's out-reach efforts in both Hong Kong and abroad through the encouragement of student participation in community service programmes among them the Summerbridge and School After School programme through which Island School students taught English and life skills to less privileged children. In 1990 Island School became the first ESF school to introduce an Interim Week during which the regular timetable was abandoned for a range of alternative challenges in Hong Kong and overseas.

Mr. James retired in 2005 and was succeeded by a deputy principal Mrs. Michelle Hughes, a graduate of Open University. Mrs Hughes's tenure began in difficult circumstances with a pay dispute between the teachers and the ESF which resulted in some curtailing of the extracurricular programme and support for parent-run activities like the school fair. Her tenure has been characterised by its attention to meeting the modern imperatives of quality assurance and in the increasing role of "student voice" at Island School. She also helped the School transition to the International Baccalaureate in Y12 and Y13.

Mrs. Hughes left the position in June 2009, and was replaced by Mr Christopher Binge, who had been the secondary principal at the La Châtaigneraie campus of the International School of Geneva. Mr Chris Binge was born and grew up in England, educated at Cambridge University (MA in Mathematics) and the Institute of Education, London (PGCE Maths Education). During his tenure, Binge played a large role in forwarding the Island School Redevelopment Project to redevelop the now quickly deteriorating Borrett Road campus. Binge was also an important driver in the School transitioning to the Middle Years Programme and the Island Futures Programme in the Middle School. In 2016, Binge left to become the head of Markham College.

Mr. Stephen Loggie left the position in December 2024 after his term ended. He was replaced by Ms. Nina Gunson who is now the current principal of Island School.

== Campus ==
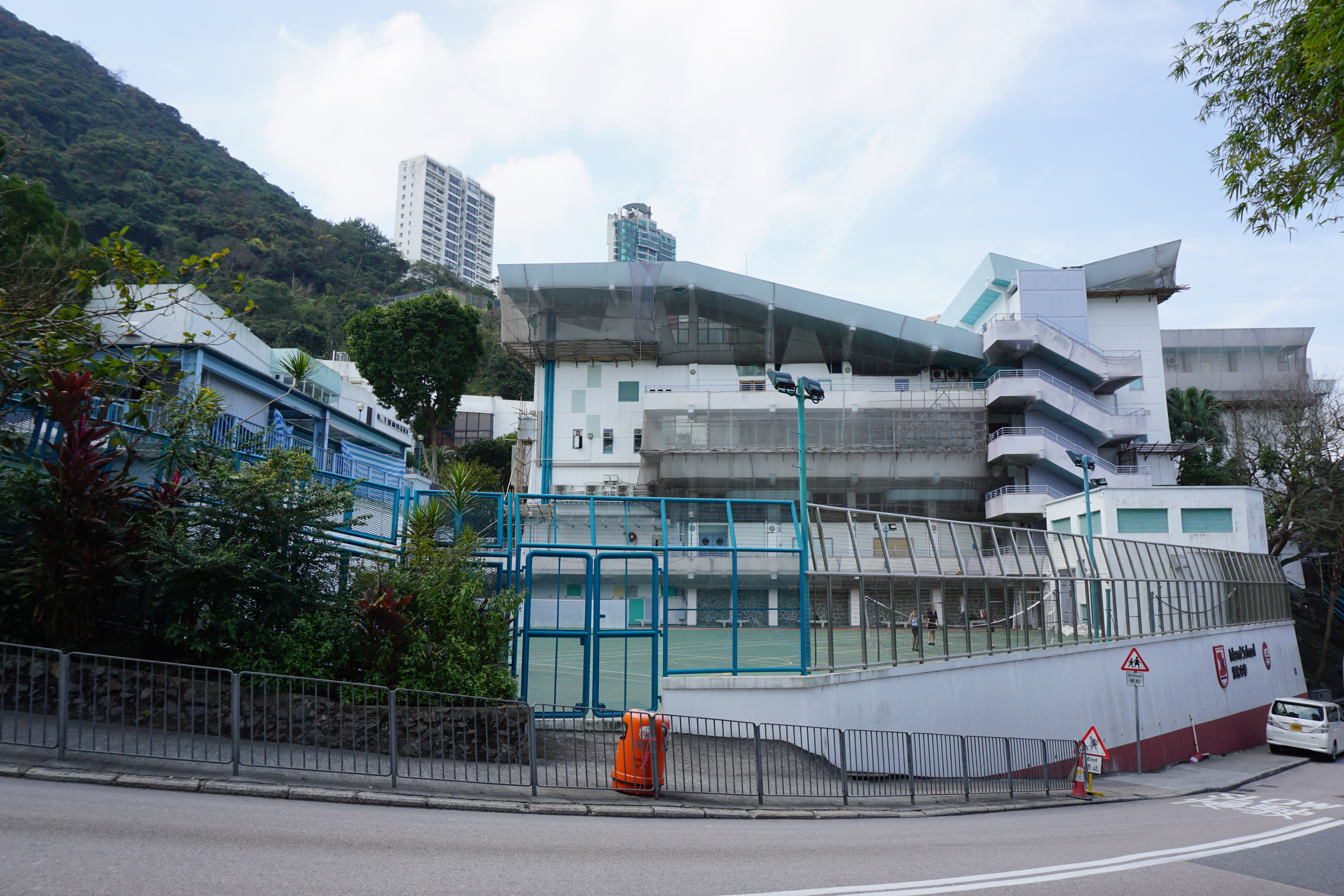
The previous campus of Island School in 2016

Island School's former campus consisted of seven blocks ranging from five to seven floors high, with blocks 1 to 6 arranged in a rectangular fashion. Students could travel to adjacent blocks by linked walkways or footbridges. As the campus was situated on mountainous terrain, blocks located close to the mountain were placed at a higher altitude than their counterparts, and as such the floors between different blocks were often not correlated. In 2018, the former campus was demolished and all learning was diverted to the two decant campuses located in the Sha Tin area.

The two decant campuses, Sha Tin Wai and Tai Wai, housed two different sets of levels. Sha Tin Wai housed Years 7, 8, 12 and 13, while Tai Wai housed Years 9, 10 and 11.

In August 2022, Island School returned to Borrett Road with a new campus. This newly built campus includes a performing arts centre, an indoor swimming pool, a sports hall, basketball courts, sky gardens, a black box theatre, and creative studios. As well as a range of other facilities there will be designated parking for school buses under the school buildings to facilitate pick-up and drop-off, thus relieving traffic pressure from Borrett Road itself.

== Academics ==
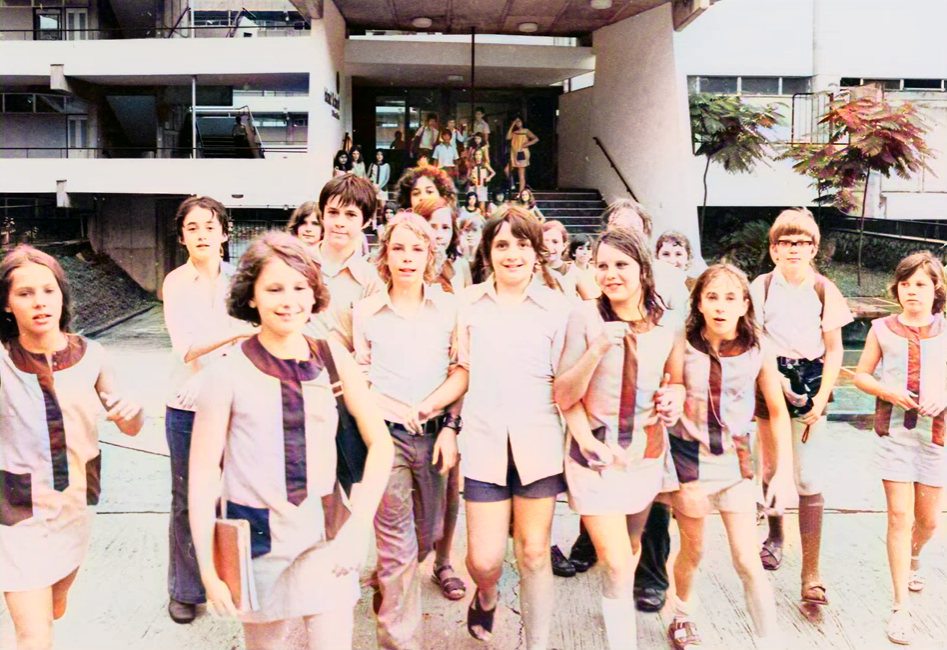
A class at Island School, circa 1970

=== Middle Phase: Years 7–10 ===
In Years 7, 8 and 9 students take part in the ‘Island Learning’ program, which has been accredited by the IB organisation as part of their MYP programme. The students there get to do subjects like humanities, theatre, music or languages.

As students move on to Years 10 & 11, Island Futures is divided into four different areas: entrance, elements, explorations and escape. The students there will have theatre, music and art combined into one subject named: Creative Arts.

=== Senior Phase: Years 11–13 ===
After completing their IGCSEs/GCSEs in Years 10 and 11, students will choose whether to study the IBCP (careers programme) or the IBDP (diploma programme) in their senior years.

Island School offers the International Baccalaureate (IB) career programme. The IBCP offers students who want to focus their education on preparing for their career a specialist pathway. Students on the IBCP choose a mixture of IB diploma courses and BTEC subjects.

The International Baccalaureate (IB) diploma programme requires students to choose six subjects for the full IB diploma. This must include at least one from each group 1–5. Students then opt to take up a Group 6 Subject or choose an additional elective subject from groups 1–5. Students must choose 3 subjects at higher level and 3 at standard level. All IB diploma students have to complete the IB Ccre. This includes the extended essay, theory of knowledge, and CAS (creativity, activity, and service).

Island School offers a great variety of IB subjects:

Group 1 - Studies in Language and Literature (A): English Literature (HL/SL), English/ Chinese Language & Literature (HL/SL), Self Taught Language (SL)

Group 2 - Language Acquisition: Chinese B (HL/SL), French B (HL/SL), French Ab initio (SL), Spanish B (HL/SL), Spanish Ab initio (SL), Japanese B (HL/SL), Japanese Ab initio (SL)

Group 3 - Individuals and Societies: Business & Management, Economics, Geography, History, Philosophy, Global Politics, Psychology (all offered at HL or SL)

Group 4 - Sciences: Computer Science, Biology, Chemistry, Physics, Design & Technology, Sports, Exercise and Health Science offered at HL or SL, Food Science at SL

Group 5 - Maths: Mathematics applications and interpretations and Mathematical analyses and approaches both at HL and SL

Group 6 - Arts: Theatre, Visual Arts and Music at SL and HL

Interdiciplinary Subjects: English Literature & Performance (1 & 6), Environmental Systems (3 & 4) at SL only

=== Examinations ===
In Island School, students take a selection of IGCSE, GCSE, IBDP or IBCP examinations.

== Notable alumni and staff ==
=== Alumni ===
- Alexandra, Countess of Frederiksborg
- Jay Haddow — professional footballer for Kitchee SC
- Mark Chapman — New Zealand and Hong Kong cricketer
- Richard Juan — actor, TV host and entrepreneur
- Christine Loh — former Hong Kong Legislative Councillor, founder and CEO of Civic Exchange and founder of Hong Kong Human Rights Monitor
- Harry Hill — comedian, author and TV presenter, attended for two years from age 14
- Mia Kang — fashion model, Muay Thai fighter and television host
- Annemarie Munk — HK Olympic swimmer
- Alice Patten, actress and daughter of Chris Patten (the last Hong Kong governor), best known for the 2006 Indian film Rang De Basanti
- Fiona Sit — singer and actress
- Anand Tucker — Thai-born film director and producer based in London, of Indian and German parentage.
- Hannah Wilson — HK Olympic swimmer.
- Melanie Wilson — GB Olympic rower, silver medal at 2016 Olympics
- Neelam Kothari — Indian actress
- Nina Wadia — British-Indian actress and comedian; awarded an Officer of the Order of the British Empire (OBE) in the 2021 New Year Honours for services to entertainment and charity
- Max Denmark - HK National Rugby Team
- Sang Heon Lee -South Korean actor

=== Principals ===
- Jonty Driver (principal, 1978–83) — wrote a book about his experiences at the school
- Chris Binge (principal 2009–17)
- Stephen Loggie (principal 2017–24) — previous principal at the school
- Nina Gunson (principal, 2025–) — current principal at the school

== See also ==
- Education in Hong Kong
