= List of girls' schools in Hong Kong =

Here are lists of schools which only admit girls in Hong Kong.

== Hong Kong Island ==
Central and Western District

Secondary Aided

- St. Clare's Girls' School
- St Stephen's Girls' College
- Ying Wa Girls' School

Primary Aided

- Sacred Heart Canossian School (嘉諾撒聖心學校)
- St Stephen's Girls' Primary School (聖士提反女子中學附屬小學)

Primary Private

- Sacred Heart Canossian School, Private Section (嘉諾撒聖心學校私立部)
- St Clare's Primary School (聖嘉勒小學)

Kindergarten

- St Clare's Primary School (聖嘉勒小學)
- St Stephen's Girls' College Kindergarten (聖士提反女子中學附屬幼稚園)

Eastern District

Secondary Government

- Belilios Public School

Secondary Aided

- Canossa College (嘉諾撒書院)
- Precious Blood Secondary School (寶血女子中學)

Southern District

Secondary Aided

- Hong Kong True Light College
- Pui Tak Canossian College (嘉諾撒培德書院)
- Sacred Heart Canossian College

Primary Aided

- Pui Tak Canossian Primary School (嘉諾撒培德學校)

Special Aided

- Marycove School (瑪利灣學校)

Wan Chai District

Secondary Government

- Hotung Secondary School (何東中學)

Secondary Aided

- Marymount Secondary School
- St Francis' Canossian College
- St Paul's Secondary School
- True Light Middle School of Hong Kong

Secondary Direct Subsidy Scheme

- St Paul's Convent School (聖保祿學校)

Primary Aided

- Marymount Primary School (瑪利曼小學)
- St Francis' Canossian School (嘉諾撒聖方濟各學校)

Primary Private

- St Paul's Convent School (Primary Section) (聖保祿學校（小學部）)
- St Paul's Primary Catholic School (聖保祿天主教小學)

== Kowloon ==
Kowloon City District

Secondary Aided

- Holy Family Canossian College (嘉諾撒聖家書院)
- Kowloon True Light School (九龍真光中學)
- Maryknoll Convent School (Secondary Section) (瑪利諾修院學校（中學部）)
- Pooi To Middle School (香港培道中學)
- St. Teresa Secondary School (德蘭中學)

Secondary Direct Subsidy

- Heep Yunn School (協恩中學)

Primary Aided

- Heep Yunn Primary School (協恩中學附屬小學)
- Holy Angels Canossian School (天神嘉諾撒學校)
- Holy Family Canossian School (Kowloon Tong) (嘉諾撒聖家學校（九龍塘）)
- Holy Family Canossian School (嘉諾撒聖家學校)
- Maryknoll Convent School (Primary Section) (瑪利諾修院學校（小學部）)
- St Rose of Lima's School (聖羅撒學校)

Kindergarten

- Heep Yunn School Private Kindergarten (協恩中學附屬幼稚園)

Others

- Integritas Education Centre (品學堂教育中心)

Kwun Tong District

Secondary Aided

- Leung Shek Chee College (梁式芝書院)
- St Antonius Girls' College (聖安當女書院)
- St Catharine's School for Girls (聖傑靈女子中學)
- St Paul's School (Lam Tin) (藍田聖保祿中學)

Special Aided

- Caritas Mother Teresa School (明愛樂恩學校)

Sham Shui Po District

Secondary Aided

- Holy Trinity College (寶血會上智英文書院)
- Our Lady of the Rosary College (聖母玫瑰書院)
- Tack Ching Girls' Secondary School (德貞女子中學)
- Tak Nga Secondary School (德雅中學)

Wong Tai Sin District

Secondary Aided

- Kit Sam Lam Bing Yim Secondary School (潔心林炳炎中學)
- Our Lady's College (聖母書院)
- Tak Oi Secondary School (德愛中學)

Secondary Direct Subsidy

- Good Hope School (德望學校)

Private Primary

- Good Hope Primary School cum Kindergarten (德望小學暨幼稚園)
- Our Lady's Primary School (聖母小學)

Special Aided

- Caritas Pelletier School (明愛培立學校)

Kindergarten

- Good Hope Primary School cum Kindergarten

Yau Tsim Mong District

Secondary Aided

- St Mary's Canossian College (嘉諾撒聖瑪利書院)
- True Light Girls' College (真光女書院)

Secondary Direct Subsidy

- Diocesan Girls' School (拔萃女書院)

Primary Aided

- St Mary's Canossian School (嘉諾撒聖瑪利學校)

Primary Private

- Diocesan Girls' Junior School (拔萃女小學)

== New Territories ==
East

Sha Tin District

- St Rose of Lima's College (聖羅撒書院) (Secondary Aided)

West

Kwai Tsing District

- DMHC Siu Ming Catholic Secondary School (天主教母佑會蕭明中學) (Secondary Aided)
- Pope Paul VI College (保祿六世書院) (Secondary Aided)

Tuen Mun District

- Madam Lau Kam Lung Secondary School of MFBM (妙法寺劉金龍中學) (Secondary Aided)

== Former girls' schools ==
- Lai Chack Middle School, now coeducational
- St. Paul's Girls' College, now St. Paul's Co-educational College

== See also ==
- List of girls' schools in the United Kingdom (Hong Kong was formerly a UK territory)
