= List of schools in Sham Shui Po District =

This is a list of schools in Sham Shui Po District, Hong Kong.

== Secondary schools ==
Government

- Kowloon Technical School (九龍工業學校)

Aided

- Buddhist Tai Hung College (佛教大雄中學)
- CCC Ming Yin College (中華基督教會銘賢書院)
- Cheung Sha Wan Catholic Secondary School (長沙灣天主教英文中學)
- CMA Secondary School (廠商會中學)
- Concordia Lutheran School (路德會協同中學)
- HK SYC&IA Wong Tai Shan Memorial College (香港四邑商工總會黃棣珊紀念中學)
- Holy Trinity College (寶血會上智英文書院)
- Maryknoll Fathers' School (瑪利諾神父教會學校)
- Nam Wah Catholic Secondary School (天主教南華中學)
- Our Lady of the Rosary College (聖母玫瑰書院)
- PLK Tong Nai Kan Junior Secondary College (保良局唐乃勤初中書院)
- SKH St Mary's Church Mok Hing Yiu College (聖公會聖馬利亞堂莫慶堯中學)
- Tack Ching Girls' Secondary School (德貞女子中學)
- Tak Nga Secondary School (德雅中學)
- TWGH Chang Ming Thien College (東華三院張明添中學)

Direct Subsidy Scheme

- Chan Shu Kui Memorial School (陳樹渠紀念中學)
- China Holiness College (中聖書院)
- Delia Memorial School (Broadway) (地利亞修女紀念學校﹝百老匯﹞)
- Delia Memorial School (Glee Path) (地利亞修女紀念學校（吉利徑）)
- Heung To Middle School (香島中學)
- St Margaret's Co-educational English Secondary and Primary School (聖瑪加利男女英文中小學)
- Tsung Tsin Christian Academy (基督教崇真中學)
- Wai Kiu College (惠僑英文中學)
- Ying Wa College (英華書院)

Caput

- United Christian College (滙基書院)

Private

- Christian Alliance International School (宣道國際學校)
- Concordia International School (協同國際學校)
- Lui Cheung Kwong Lutheran Evening College (路德會呂祥光英文夜中學)
- Po Leung Kuk Choi Kai Yau School (保良局蔡繼有學校)
- Tsung Tsin Middle School (崇正中學)

== Primary schools ==
Government

- Fuk Wing Street Government Primary School (福榮街官立小學)
- Li Cheng Uk Government Primary School (李鄭屋官立小學)
  - In 1994 it had significant numbers of students with origins from India and the Philippines.
- Sham Shui Po Government Primary School (深水埗官立小學)

Aided

- Alliance Primary School, Tai Hang Tung (大坑東宣道小學)
- CCC Heep Woh Primary School (Cheung Sha Wan) (中華基督教會協和小學（長沙灣）)
- Cheung Sha Wan Catholic Primary School (長沙灣天主教小學)
- Five Districts Business Welfare Association School (五邑工商總會學校)
- Good Counsel Catholic Primary School (天主教善導小學)
- HK Sze Yap C&IA San Wui Commercial Society School (香港四邑商工總會新會商會學校)
- Hoi Ping Chamber of Commerce Primary School (旅港開平商會學校)
- Ka Ling School of the Precious Blood (寶血會嘉靈學校)
- Laichikok Catholic Primary School (荔枝角天主教小學)
- Maryknoll Fathers' School (Primary Section) (瑪利諾神父教會學校（小學部）)
- S.K.H. Kei Fook Primary School (聖公會基福小學)
- S.K.H. St. Andrew's Primary School (聖公會聖安德烈小學)
- SKH Kei Oi Primary School (聖公會基愛小學)
- SKH St Clement's Primary School (聖公會聖紀文小學)
- SKH St Thomas' Primary School (聖公會聖多馬小學)
- Shamshuipo Kaifong Welfare Association Primary School (深水埔街坊福利會小學)
- St Francis of Assisi's Caritas School (聖方濟愛德小學)
- The ELCHK Faith Lutheran School (基督教香港信義會深信學校)

Direct Subsidy Scheme

- Lingnan University Alumni Association (Hong Kong) Primary School (嶺南大學香港同學會小學)
- St Margaret's Co-educational English Secondary & Primary School
- Ying Wa Primary School (英華小學)

Private

- Bloom KKCA Academy (百卉九江書院)
- Chan's Creative School (啓基學校
- Christian Alliance International School (宣道國際學校)
- Delia English Primary School and Kindergarten) (地利亞英文小學暨幼稚園)
- Kowloon Rhenish School (九龍禮賢學校)
- Po Leung Kuk Choi Kai Yau School (保良局蔡繼有學校)
- San Wui Commercial Society of YMCA Hong Kong Christian School (新會商會港青基信學校)
- St Francis of Assisi's English Primary School (聖方濟各英文小學)
- Tak Nga Primary School (德雅小學)
- Tsung Tsin Primary School and Kindergarten (崇真小學暨幼稚園)

== Special schools ==
Aided

- Caritas Jockey Club Lok Yan School (明愛賽馬會樂仁學校)
- CCC Mongkok Church Kai Oi School (中華基督教會望覺堂啟愛學校)
- Hong Kong Red Cross Hospital Schools Caritas Medical Centre (香港紅十字會醫院學校)
- Hong Kong Red Cross Hospital Schools Princess Margaret Hospital (香港紅十字會醫院學校)
- Mental Health Association of Hong Kong - Cornwall School (香港心理衞生會－臻和學校)
- Saviour Lutheran School (路德會救主學校)
- The Society of Boys' Centres Hui Chung Sing Memorial School (香港扶幼會－許仲繩紀念學校)
- The Society of Boys' Centres Chak Yan Centre School (香港扶幼會則仁中心學校
- TWGH Kwan Fong Kai Chi School (東華三院群芳啓智學校)
