= List of schools in Sha Tin District =

This is a list of schools in Sha Tin District, Hong Kong.

== Secondary schools ==
Government

- Helen Liang Memorial Secondary School (Shatin)
- Sha Tin Government Secondary School

Aided

- Baptist Lui Ming Choi Secondary School (浸信會呂明才中學)
- Buddhist Kok Kwong Secondary School (佛教覺光法師中學)
- Buddhist Wong Man Tin College (佛教黃允畋中學)
- Caritas Ma On Shan Secondary School (明愛馬鞍山中學)
- Chinese YMCA College (青年會書院)
- Chiu Chow Association Secondary School (潮州會館中學)
- Christ College (基督書院)
- Christian Alliance Cheng Wing Gee College (香港九龍塘基督教中華宣道會鄭榮之中學)
- CUHKFAA Chan Chun Ha Secondary School (香港中文大學校友會聯會陳震夏中學)
- GCC&ITKD Lau Pak Lok Secondary School (東莞工商總會劉百樂中學)
- HKCWC Fung Yiu King Memorial Secondary School (香港中國婦女會馮堯敬紀念中學)
- Immaculate Heart of Mary College (聖母無玷聖心書院)
- Jockey Club Ti-I College (賽馬會體藝中學)
- Kiangsu-Chekiang College (Shatin) (沙田蘇浙公學)
- Kwok Tak Seng Catholic Secondary School (天主教郭得勝中學)
- Lock Tao Secondary School (樂道中學)
- Lok Sin Tong Young Ko Hsiao Lin Secondary School (樂善堂楊葛小琳中學)
- Ma On Shan St Joseph's Secondary School (馬鞍山聖若瑟中學)
- Ma On Shan Tsung Tsin Secondary School (馬鞍山崇真中學)
- Ng Yuk Secondary School (五育中學)
- Pentecostal Lam Hon Kwong School (五旬節林漢光中學)
- PLK C W Chu College (保良局朱敬文中學)
- PLK Wu Chung College (保良局胡忠中學)
- Pok Oi Hospital Chan Kai Memorial College (博愛醫院陳楷紀念中學)
- Sha Tin Methodist College (沙田循道衞理中學)
- Shatin Pui Ying College (沙田培英中學)
- Shatin Tsung Tsin Secondary School (沙田崇真中學)
- SKH Lam Kau Mow Secondary School (聖公會林裘謀中學)
- SKH Tsang Shiu Tim Secondary School (聖公會曾肇添中學)
- St Rose of Lima's College (聖羅撒書院)
- Toi Shan Association College (台山商會中學)
- Tsang Pik Shan (Sung Lan) Secondary School (曾璧山（崇蘭）中學)
- TWGH Mrs Fung Wong Fung Ting College (東華三院馮黃鳳亭中學)
- TWGH Wong Fung Ling College (東華三院黃鳳翎中學)
- TWGH Yow Kam Yuen College (東華三院邱金元中學)
- YCH Tung Chi Ying Memorial Secondary School (仁濟醫院董之英紀念中學)

Direct Subsidy Scheme

- HKBUAS Wong Kam Fai Secondary & Primary School (香港浸會大學附屬學校王錦輝中小學)
- Lam Tai Fai College (林大輝中學)
- Li Po Chun United World College
- Piu Kiu College (培僑書院)
- Stewards Pooi Kei College (香港神託會培基書院)
- Tak Sun Secondary School (德信中學)

English Schools Foundation

- Island School
- Sha Tin College

Private

- International Christian School
- PLK & Sprouts Foundation Secondary Education Service Center (保良局思培基金中學教育服務中心)
- Renaissance College (啓新書院)
- Shatin Lutheran Evening School (路德會沙田夜校)

== Primary schools ==
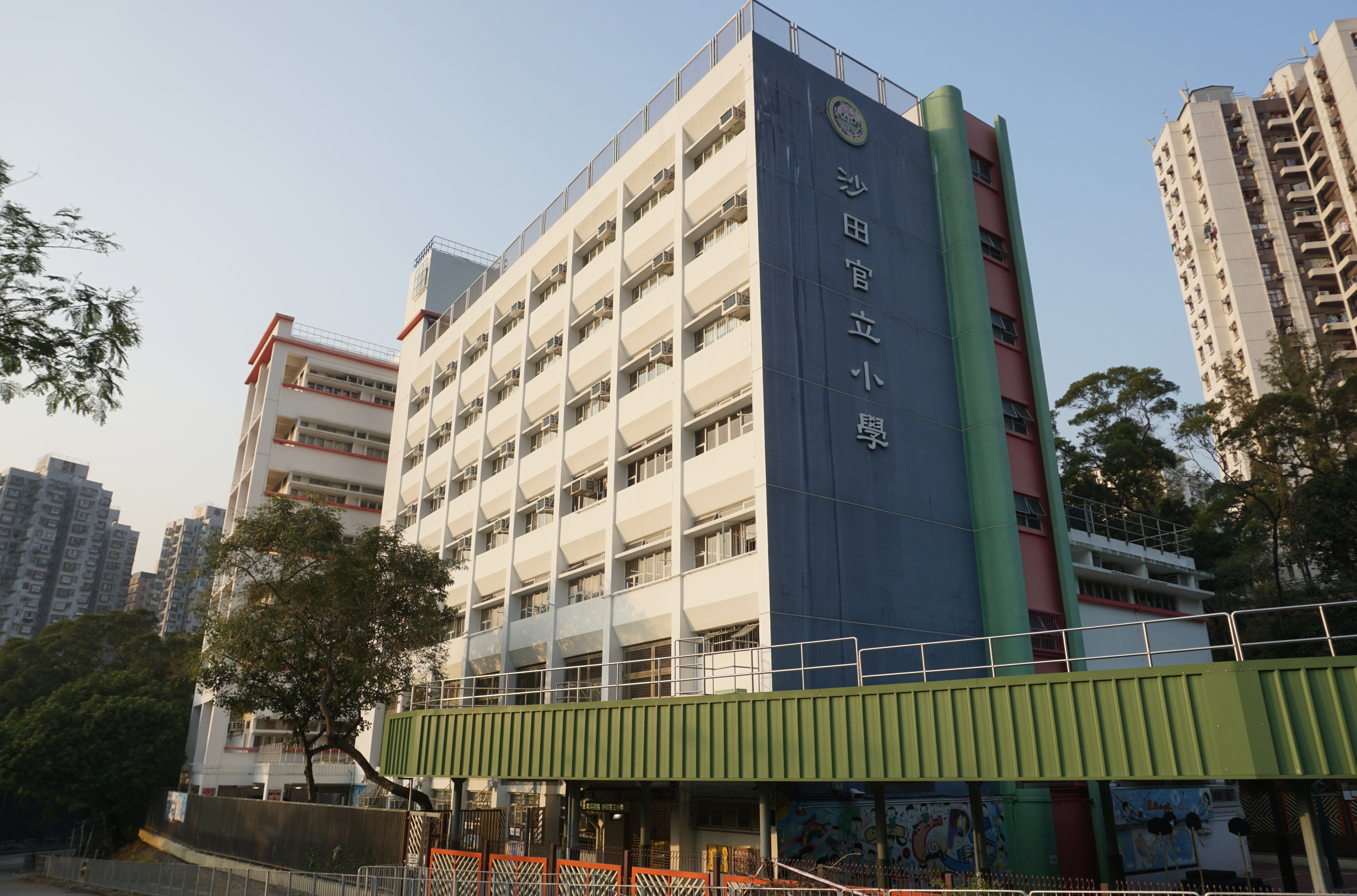
Sha Tin Government Primary School

Government

- Sha Tin Government Primary School (沙田官立小學)

Aided

- Baptist (Sha Tin Wai) Lui Ming Choi Primary School (浸信會沙田圍呂明才小學)
- Baptist Lui Ming Choi Primary School (浸信會呂明才小學)
- Carmel Alison Lam Primary School (迦密愛禮信小學)
- Chi Hong Primary School (慈航學校)
- Christian Alliance H C Chan Primary School (香港九龍塘基督教中華宣道會陳元喜小學)
- CUHKFAA Thomas Cheung School (香港中文大學校友會聯會張煊昌學校)
- Dr Catherine F Woo Memorial School (胡素貞博士紀念學校)
- Free Methodist Bradbury Chun Lei Primary School (循理會白普理基金循理小學)
- Free Methodist Mei Lam Primary School (循理會美林小學)
- HCC&ITKD Cheong Wong Wai Primary School (東莞工商總會張煌偉小學)
- HKTA Shun Yeung Primary School (香港道教聯合會純陽小學)
- Immaculate Heart of Mary School (聖母無玷聖心學校)
- KCBC Hay Nien (Yan Ping) Primary School (九龍城浸信會禧年（恩平）小學)
- Kowloon City Baptist Church Hay Nien Primary School (九龍城浸信會禧年小學)
- Leung Kui Kau Lutheran Primary School (路德會梁鉅鏐小學)
- LKWFS Wong Yiu Nam Primary School (世界龍岡學校黃耀南小學)
- Ma On Shan Ling Liang Primary School (馬鞍山靈糧小學)
- Ma On Shan Methodist Primary School (馬鞍山循道衛理小學)
- Ma On Shan St. Joseph's Primary School (馬鞍山聖若瑟小學)
- Ng Clan's Association Tai Pak Memorial School (吳氏宗親總會泰伯紀念學校)
- PLK Chee Jing Yin Primary School (保良局朱正賢小學)
- PLK Chong Kee Ting Primary School (保良局莊啟程小學)
- PLK Dr. Jimmy Wong Chi-ho (Tin Sum Valley) Primary School (保良局王賜豪（田心谷）小學)
- PLK Riverain Primary School (保良局雨川小學)
- PLK Siu Hon-sum Primary School (保良局蕭漢森小學)
- Sa Tin Ka Ping School (救世軍田家炳學校)
- Sha Tin Methodist Primary School (沙田循道衛理小學)
- Sha Tin Wai Dr. Catherine F. Woo Memorial School (沙田圍胡素貞博士紀念學校)
- Shatin Tsung Tsin School (沙田崇真學校)
- SKH Holy Spirit Primary School (聖公會主風小學)
- SKH Ma On Shan Holy Spirit Primary School (聖公會馬鞍山主風小學
- Stewards Pooi Kei Primary School (培基小學)
- The ELCHK Ma On Shan Lutheran Primary School (基督教香港信義會馬鞍山信義學校)
- The ELCHK Wo Che Lutheran School (基督教香港信義會禾輋信義學校)
- The Little Flower's Catholic Primary School (天主教聖華學校)
- TWGH Sin Chu Wan Primary School (東華三院冼次雲小學)
- TWGHS Tsoi Wing Sing Primary School (東華三院蔡榮星小學)

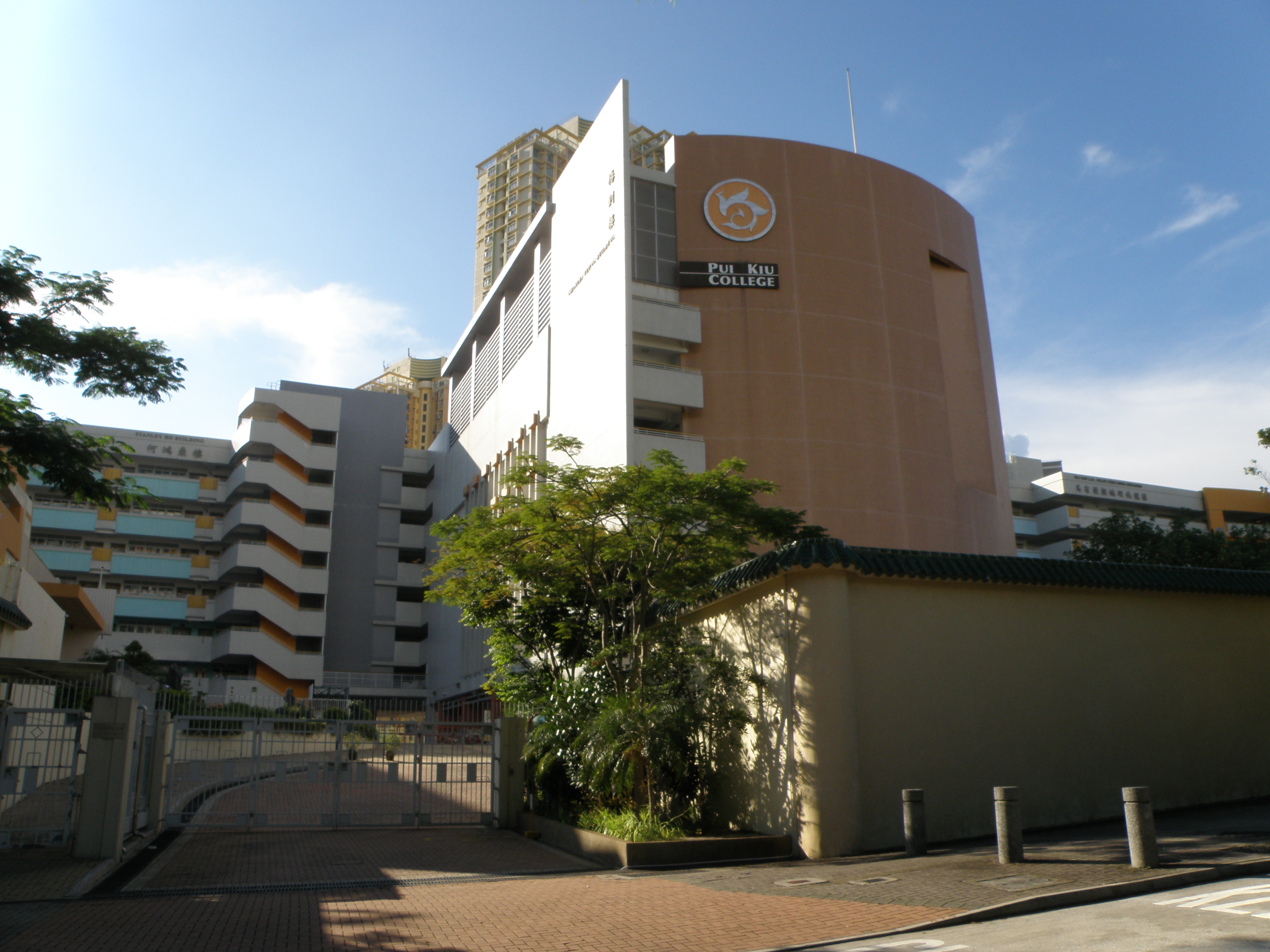
Pui Kiu College

Direct Subsidy Scheme

- Hong Kong Baptist University Affiliated School Wong Kam Fai Secondary and Primary School (香港浸會大學附屬學校王錦輝中小學)
- Pui Kiu College (培僑書院)

English Schools Foundation

- Shatin Junior School

Private

- Anfield School (安菲爾學校)
- International Christian School
- Renaissance College

== Special schools ==
Aided

- Caritas Lok Jun School (明愛樂進學校)
- Caritas Resurrection School (明愛樂群學校)
- Choi Jun School (才俊學校)
- Hong Kong Red Cross Hospital Schools Prince of Wales Hospital (香港紅十字會醫院學校)
- SAHK Ko Fook Iu Memorial School (香港耀能協會高福耀紀念學校)
- Shatin Public School (沙田公立學校)

== Former schools ==
Government

- Sir Ellis Kadoorie Secondary School (Shatin) (育才中學（沙田）)
