= King Ling =

King Ling may refer to:

- King Ling College, a secondary school in Tseung Kwan O, Hong Kong
- King Ling of Zhou (died 545 BC)
- King Ling of Chu (died 529 BC)

== See also ==
- Duke Ling (disambiguation)
