= STMC (disambiguation) =

STMC may refer to:

- Sha Tin Methodist College, a government subsidized secondary school, sponsored by the Methodist Church in Hong Kong
- South Texas Medical Center, a medical research and educational center in South Texas
- St. Thomas More Collegiate, a high school located in Burnaby, British Columbia, Canada
- Standseilbahn St. Moritz–Corviglia, a funicular railway in the Swiss canton of Graubunden
