= Cumberland Presbyterian Church Yao Dao Secondary School =

- 金巴崙長老會耀道中學
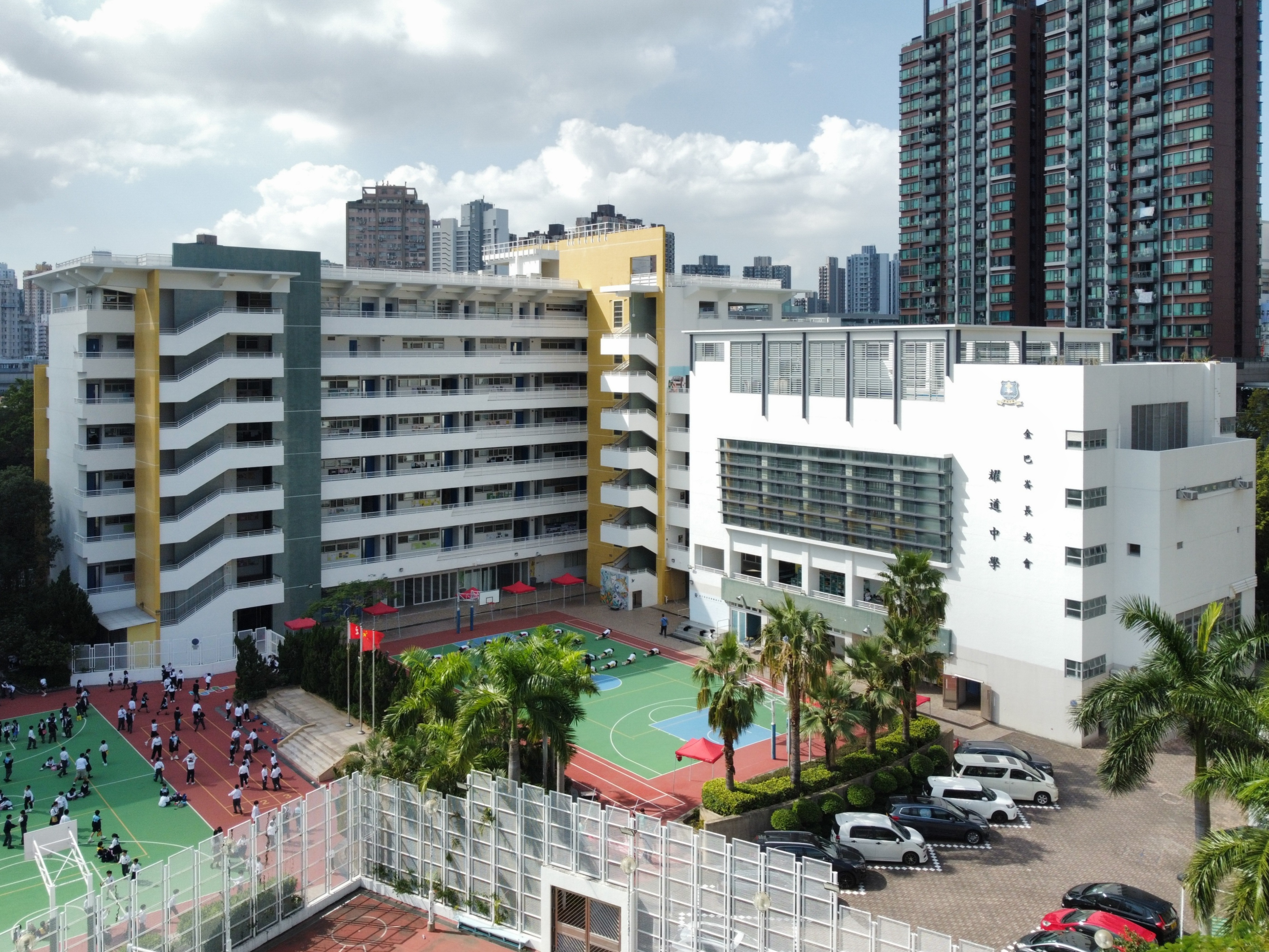
- Pictured in 2023

Location
- 28 Hong Yip Street, Yuen Long, New Territories; Hong Kong
- Coordinates: 22.449283°N 114.032514°E

Information
- School type: Aided Secondary school
- Motto: Striving for Excellence, Fortitude and Veracity; Aiming at Christlikeness(sic), Self-sacrifice and the Glorifying of God (尚卓越鍊剛毅熱切求真 效基督學捨己榮神愛人)
- Religious affiliation: Christianity
- Denomination: Cumberland Presbyterian Church
- Established: 2005
- Status: Active
- Sister school: Cumberland Presbyterian Church Yao Dao Primary School
- School district: Yuen Long District
- Chairman: Tse Tak-yan
- Principal: Lau Chi-kuen
- Chaplain: William Yeung Kin-keung
- Teaching staff: 61 (as of 2017)
- Years: 6
- Gender: Co-educational
- Classes: 24 (as of 2017)
- Language: Predominantly Chinese
- Campus size: About 6000 m²
- Houses: Red; Yellow; Purple; Green
- Affiliation: Cumberland Presbyterian Church of Hong Kong
- Website: cpcydss.edu.hk

Cumberland Presbyterian Church Yao Dao Secondary School (Chinese: 金巴崙長老會耀道中學) is an aided secondary school in Hong Kong. Located in Yuen Long, New Territories, the school was established by Cumberland Presbyterian Church of Hong Kong in 2005. The school has close ties with its sister school, Cumberland Presbyterian Church Yao Dao Primary School, which was established in 2000 and located in Tin Shui Wai.

== History ==
After establishing Cumberland Presbyterian Church Yao Dao Primary School, the first primary school of the church, in 2000 and receiving donations from several church members, Cumberland Presbyterian Church of Hong Kong submitted an application for school registration for the second time in 2002 to materialize its philosophy of education.

In 2003, the former Education and Manpower Bureau approved the church's application and granted an unallocated land in Yuen Long Kau Hui to the church. Construction of the school, named as Cumberland Presbyterian Church Yao Dao Secondary School in the proposal, began in early 2004 and was completed in August 2005. It was then officially opened in September 2005, welcoming its first batch of students. The school held numerous extracurricular activities, ranging from World Book Day celebrations to talent shows, to foster students' whole-person development soon after its inauguration. The television station of the school, founded in 2006, began producing English programmes from the same year and beyond.

The school extended its class structure at the request of the Education Bureau, also countering the need for education. The school bid farewell to its first batch of graduates, which had been students of the school for just 2 years, due to the Education Bureau's refusal of the school's request to commence Form 6 classes, in 2009. The school celebrated its 5th anniversary whilst its students' union and parent-teacher association were both established in 2010.

The school bid its farewell to the graduates of 2012, who had spent 6 years in the school since its commencement in 2005. Incumbent vice-principal of the school, Lee Lok-sing, was appointed and several senior teachers were elevated in the same year. Renovation of the school, including installations of the Wi-Fi network and Apple TV devices in some classrooms, began in the same year and were completed by 2014. The school started to design a school-based Chinese history curriculum for all junior secondary students in 2012 and implemented it in the next year. In 2013, a greenhouse was built to encourage students to participate in agricultural activities and a model was set up to display the mechanisms of a sustainable ecosystem.

The school celebrated its 10th anniversary through launching numerous festivities and galas in 2015.

== See also ==
- Cumberland Presbyterian Church of Hong Kong
- Education in Hong Kong
- List of secondary schools in Hong Kong
- List of schools in Hong Kong
