= Duke Ling =

Duke Ling may refer to these ancient Chinese rulers:

- Duke Ling of Jin (died 607 BC)
- Duke Ling of Qi (died 554 BC)
- Duke Ling of Wey (died 492 BC)
- Duke Ling of Qin (died 415 BC)

== See also ==
- King Ling (disambiguation)
