= Hong Kong Tang King Po College =

Coordinates: 22.2739°N 114.1716°E

Tang King Po College 香港鄧鏡波書院
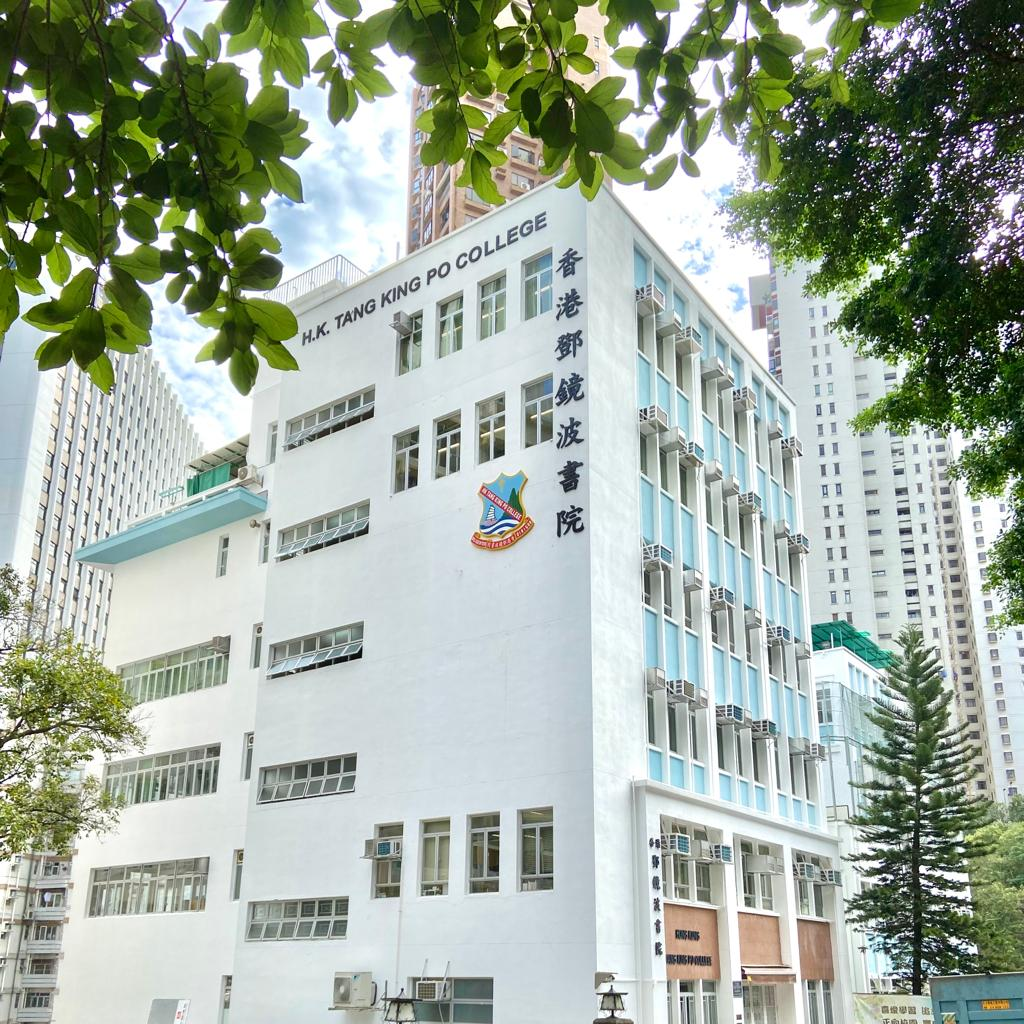
- 25 & 27 Kennedy Road; Wan Chai; Hong Kong Island

Information
- Type: Aid School
- Religious affiliation: Roman Catholic
- Established: 1965
- Principal: Wong Ka Ming
- Gender: Male
- Language: English & Chinese
- Website: www.hktkpc.edu.hk

Hong Kong Tang King Po College (Chinese: 香港鄧鏡波書院) is a Catholic male-only secondary school in Hong Kong. It is located in Wan Chai District. It was founded by the Salesians and Sir Tang King Po in 1965.

== History ==
The school was founded by Sir Tang King Po, a Hong Kong industrialist and philanthropist.

The school was opened in 1965. The school used St. Louis School as its temporary school building prior to the Kennedy Road campus being completed in 1966.

In 1978, it was transformed from a "privately aided" school to a "government-subsidised" grammar school, which the school's name was changed to the present-day's name.

== See also ==
- List of secondary schools in Hong Kong
