= Sheung Shui Government Secondary School =

Hong Kong secondary school

Coordinates: 22.4963885°N 114.1287684°E

Sheung Shui Government Secondary School (SSGSS)
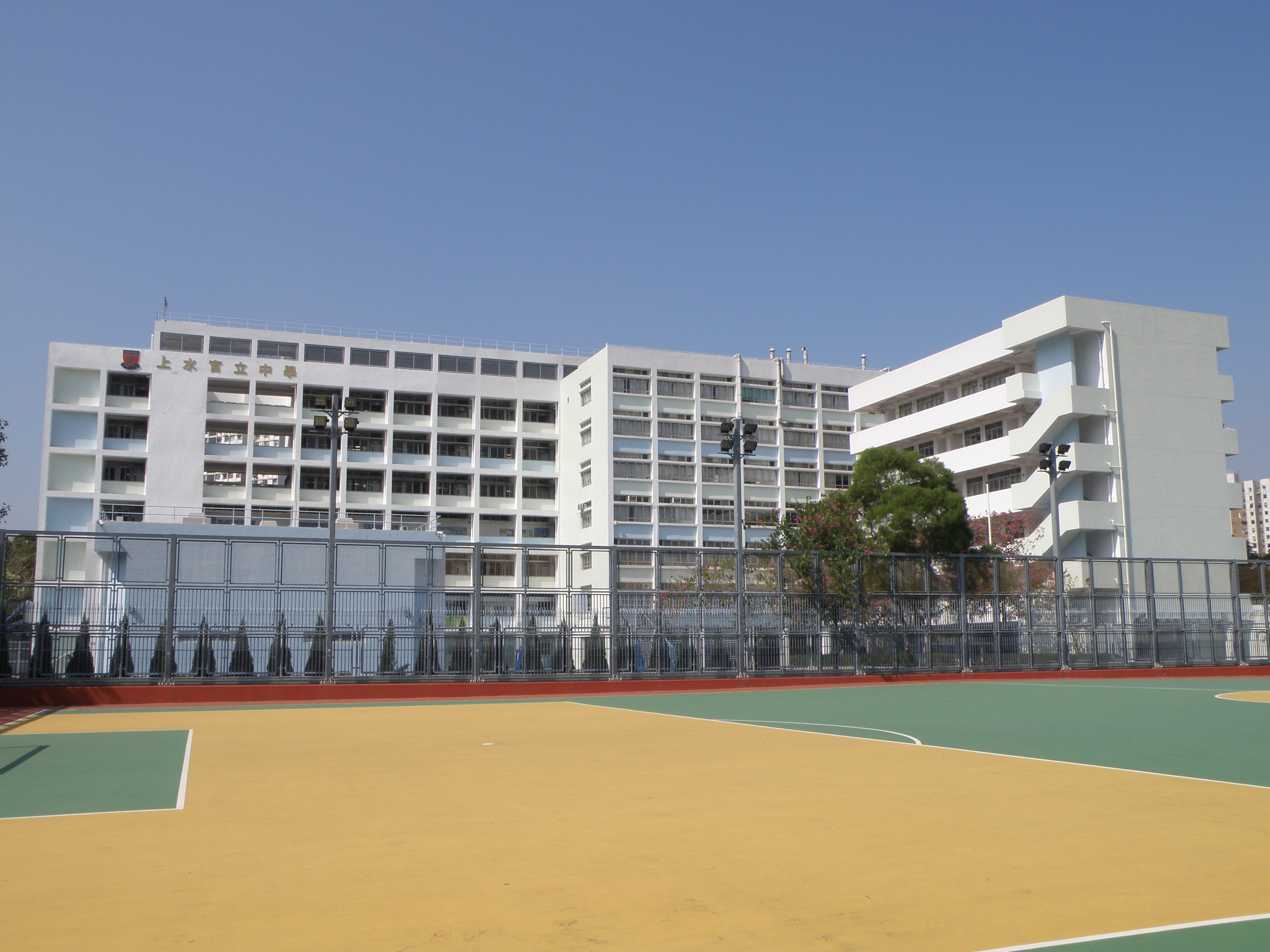
- Sheung Shui Government Secondary School

Location
- 21 Pak Wo Road, Sheung Shui, Hong Kong

Information
- Motto: Ai (Love), Jiang (Health), Zhong (Loyalty), Qin (Diligence)
- Established: September 1991; 34 years ago
- Principal: Mr. Lee Lung-hei Michael
- Enrollment: 600
- Language: Chinese
- Website: https://www.ssgss.edu.hk/

Sheung Shui Government Secondary School
- Traditional Chinese: 上水官立中學
- Simplified Chinese: 上水官立中学
Transcriptions
Standard Mandarin
- Hanyu Pinyin: Shàng Shuǐ Guānlì Zhōngxué
Yue: Cantonese
- Jyutping: soeng5 seoi2 gun1 laap6 zung1 hok6

Sheung Shui Government Secondary School (SSGSS, Chinese: 上水官立中學) is a co-educational secondary school operated by the Government of Hong Kong located in Sheung Shui, Hong Kong. The school was founded in 1991 and its medium of instruction is Chinese.

== History ==
The school was established in September 1991.

On 27 February 2009, two 15-year-old boys sold ketamine to five girls aged 13 to 14 from the school and the girls had complained of feeling sick after allegedly taking the drug during lunchtime. The girls were taken to North District Hospital and were later arrested. The two boys were arrested in connection with the case on the same day and the following day and the arrests were made as officers were looking into the source of the illegal drug, bringing the number arrested in the case to nine.

On 26 March 2009, the then Secretary for Security, Ambrose Lee, visited the school to exchange views with students and share his experience in cultivating a healthy and positive life. At that time, he also saw the performance of 903 Drama Tour at the school and expressed appreciation in handling a campus drug abuse incident the month before.

In October 2009, a boy who helped provide ketamine to five pupils in the school was sent to a rehabilitation centre and pleaded guilty to doing an act for the purpose of trafficking in a substance he believed to be a dangerous drug. A report indicated that while he was in custody, he had been isolated by others and had been described as mentally deficient.

In November 2009, a boy was sentenced in Fanling Court to a detention centre for selling HK$100 of ketamine to five girls at the school. Magistrate Don So Man-lung said that the case was serious and noted that it involved only a small amount of ketamine and he noted that the body had done poorly in his studies, left school after Form One and was from a broken home.

On 26 July 2015, the school and Inter-departmental Working Group on Clean Shorelines jointly held a Shorelines Cleanup Day at Wu Kai Sha to promote the message of keeping the shorelines clean. The students and teachers gathered there to sort and systematically record the types of refuse collected, according to guidelines provided by the Environmental Protection Department and were keen to help keep the shorelines clean and to learn more about the importance of protecting the marine environment. The school assistant principal said that the school had supported this meaningful event, through which the students could play a part in serving the community while also having fun on the beach.

== Notable alumni ==
- Lam Cho Shun – CEO of HKGolden
- Christine To Chi-long – film screenwriter and producer
- Roy Chow Hin-yeung – film director and producer
- Michelle Wai Si-nga – actress
- Angela Yuen Lai-lam – model and actor

== See also ==
- Education in Hong Kong
- List of secondary schools in Hong Kong
