= King Ling College =

King Ling College (Chinese: 景嶺書院)

Location
- 1 Lam Shing Road; Tseung Kwan O Hong Kong
- Coordinates: 22°19′6.26″N 114°15′12.51″E

Information
- School type: Aided, Secondary school
- Motto: Diligence, Perseverance, Integrity, Simplicity (Chinese: 勤、毅、誠、樸)
- Established: 2 March 1994; 31 years ago
- School district: Sai Kung District
- Supervisor: Yu Che-fan
- Principal: Anson Yang
- Teaching staff: 63
- Forms: Form 1–Form 6
- Gender: Co-educational
- Enrollment: 855 (2014–2015)
- Area: 6,826 m^{2} (73,470 sq ft)
- Publication: Landscape
- Website: https://www.kingling.edu.hk/

King Ling College (Chinese: 景嶺書院) is an aided secondary school in Tseung Kwan O, Hong Kong. It was founded in 1994 by the King Ling Foundation for Education and Culture.

== Overview ==
The college's mission is "Upholding Chinese heritage. Dignifying humanity." The college was one of the first schools in Hong Kong to teach Chinese language classes in Putonghua.

As of 2024, the college offers 35 extracurricular activity clubs in four categories: academics, sports, interests and religious, and services. It has a student union, and a house system consisting of four houses.

The college has 29 classrooms and an indoor swimming pool. All classrooms and special rooms have air-conditioning and liquid-crystal display projectors installed.

== See also ==
- Education in Hong Kong
- List of secondary schools in Hong Kong
