= Times College, Hong Kong =

Private secondary school in Hong Kong

Times College
- 當代書院

Location
- Unit B, 7/F, Shui Shing Building, 202-204 Cheung Sha Wan Road, Sham Shui Po; Sham Shui Po; Hong Kong; Hong Kong
- Coordinates: 22.330861°N 114.162527°E

Information
- School type: private, secondary school
- Motto: Strengthen self without stopping, and hold world with virtue

Times College (當代書院) is a private full-time secondary school in Hong Kong.
