= Lung Cheung Government Secondary School =

Hong Kong secondary school

Coordinates: 22.3429°N 114.1902°E

Lung Cheung Government Secondary School (LCGSS)
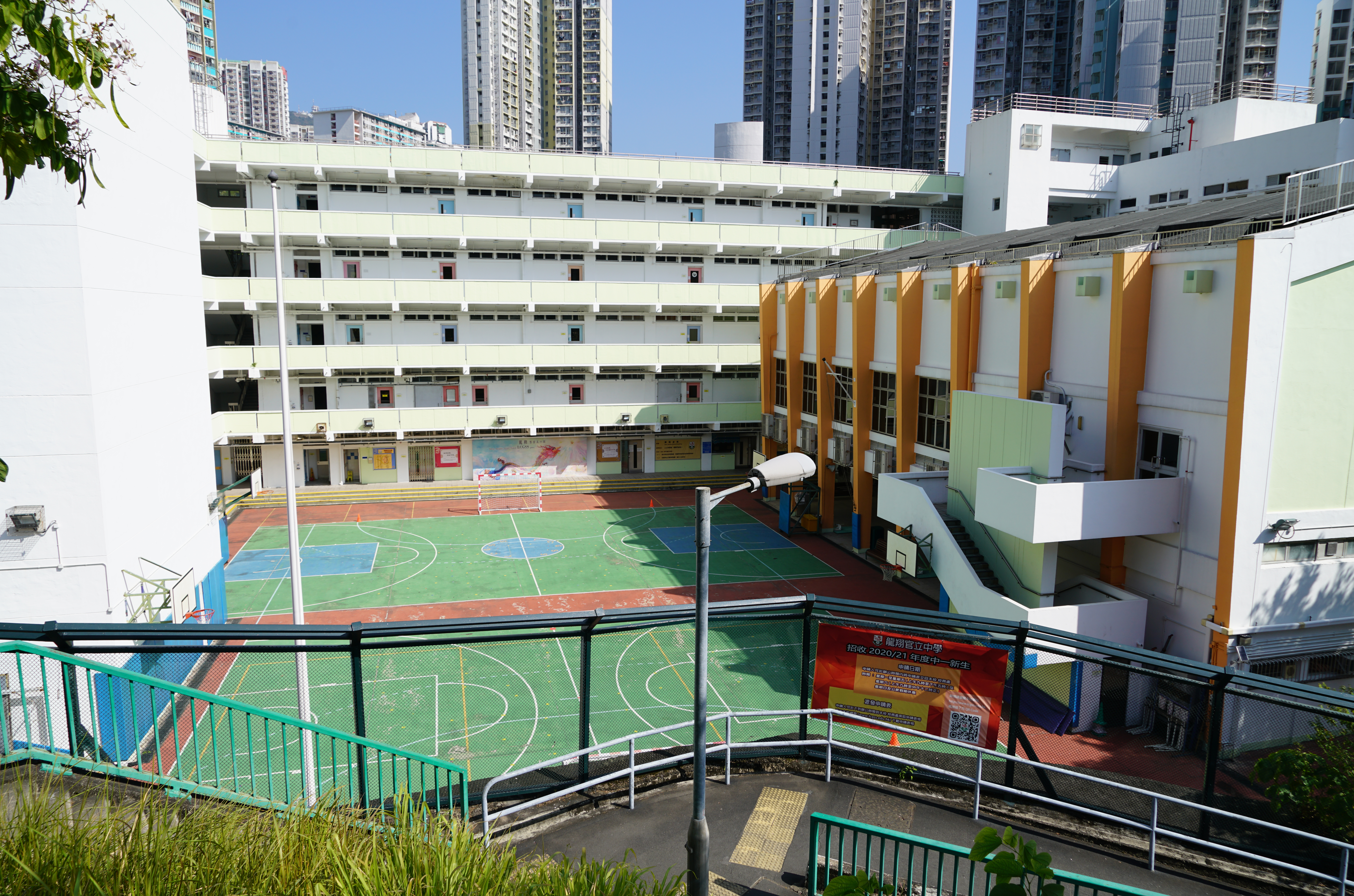
- Lung Cheung Government Secondary School in 2020

Location
- 1 Ma Chai Hang Road, Wong Tai Sin, Hong Kong

Information
- Motto: BENE DISCE OMNIA POTES
- Established: 1970; 56 years ago
- Principal: Ms. Wong Kit-hing
- Enrollment: 450
- Language: Chinese
- Website: https://www.lcgss.edu.hk/

Lung Cheung Government Secondary School
- Traditional Chinese: 龍翔官立中學
- Simplified Chinese: 龙翔官立中学
Transcriptions
Standard Mandarin
- Hanyu Pinyin: Lóng Xiáng Guānlì Zhōngxué
Yue: Cantonese
- Jyutping: lung4 coeng4 gun1 laap6 zung1 hok6

Lung Cheung Government Secondary Technical School
- Traditional Chinese: 龍翔官立工業中學
- Simplified Chinese: 龙翔官立工业中学
Transcriptions
Standard Mandarin
- Hanyu Pinyin: Lóng Xiáng Guānlì Gōngyè Zhōngxué
Yue: Cantonese
- Jyutping: lung4 coeng4 gun1 laap6 gung1 jip6 zung1 hok6

Lung Cheung Government Secondary School (LCGSS, Chinese: 龍翔官立中學) is a government secondary school in Wong Tai Sin, Hong Kong.

Lung Cheung Government Secondary Technical School (龍翔官立工業中學) was established in 1970. Originally it was only for boys. It became coeducational and an academic-focused institution in 2010.

In 1997, Sun Yin-wai was the principal. That year, he stated that the school's approach was a "whole-school" scheme which included a programme focusing on morality and civics.

As of 2018, Clark Chan Cheung-lam is the principal. In 2018, the school began allowing the usage of its facilities to outside groups as part of a government scheme to make more flexible land use. The Hong Kong Rope Skipping Association had inquired about using Lung Cheung's facilities.

Every year the school has a speech day.
