= Christian Alliance Cheng Wing Gee College =

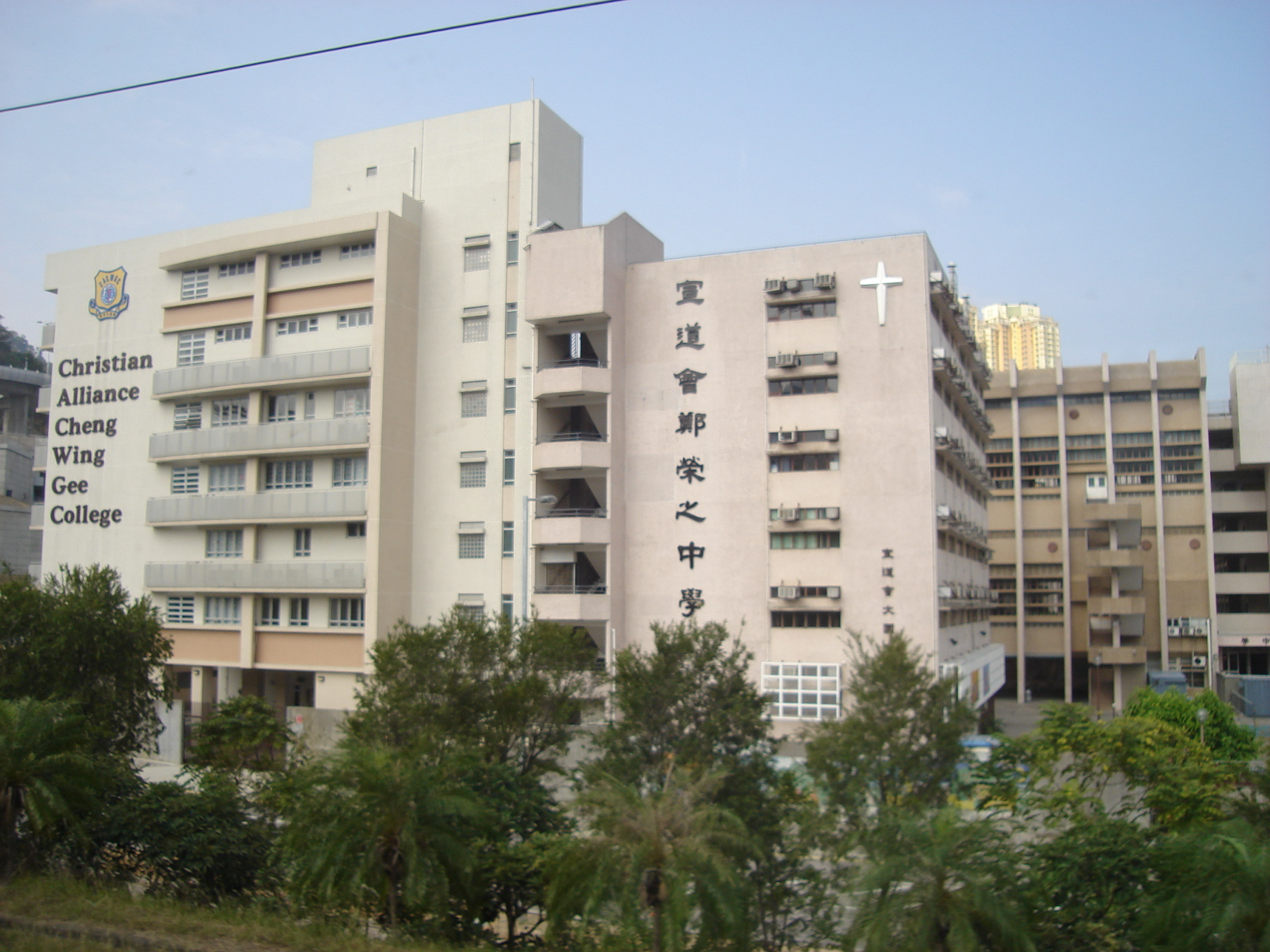

Location
- 12-14 Chik Wan Street, Tai Wai, Sha Tin, New Territories; Hong Kong; 22.3720°N 114.1757°E

Information
- Other name: Christian Alliance Cheng Wing Gee College
- Type: Aided Secondary School
- Motto: The fear of the LORD is the beginning of wisdom, and knowledge of the Holy One is understanding.
- Established: 1984; 42 years ago
- Principal: Shum Kai Shing
- Staff: 90
- Language: English
- Affiliation: Kowloon Tong Church of the Chinese Christian and Missionary Alliance
- Website: www.cwgc.edu.hk

Christian Alliance Cheng Wing Gee College (abbreviated as CACWGC or CWGC) is an Evangelical Christian Secondary School located next to Tai Wai station, in Hong Kong. It is affiliated with the Kowloon Tong Church of the Chinese Christian and Missionary Alliance.

== History ==
It was established in 1984 by Kowloon Tong Church of the Chinese Christian and Missionary Alliance (KTAC).

Starting from 2016, subjects provided during fourth year include chemistry, physics, biology, geography, economics, information technology, BAFS, Chinese history, M2 and design and technology (DAT).
