= Immaculate Heart of Mary College =

Roman Catholic school in Quezon City, Philippines

Immaculate Heart of Mary College Inc.
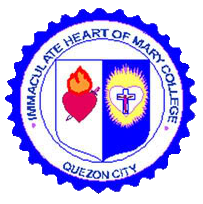

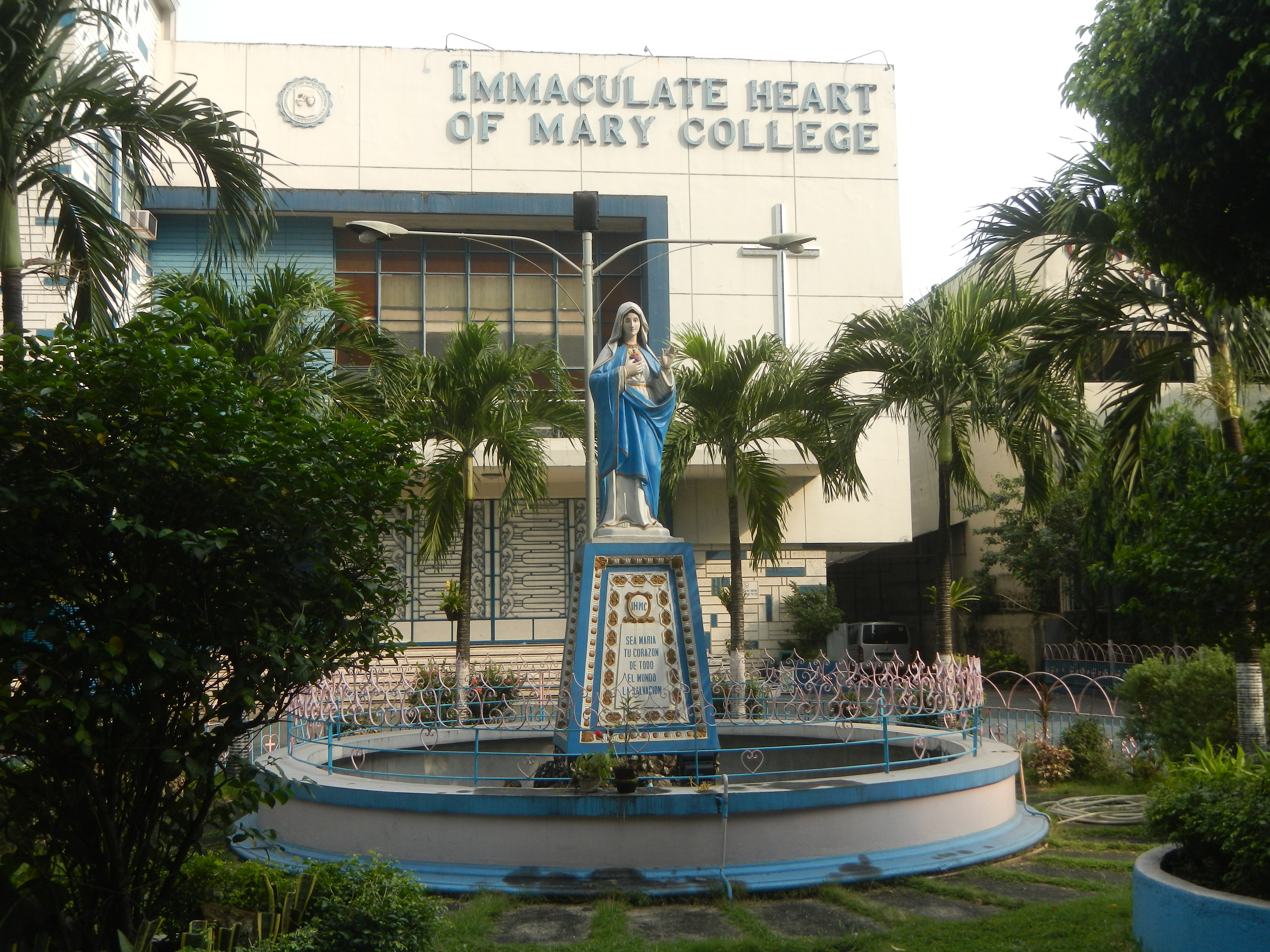
- Main building in September 2016

Location
- 54 Aurora Boulevard; Quezon City, Metro Manila; Philippines; 14°36′24.09″N 121°1′14.88″E

Information
- Type: Private, Roman Catholic basic education institution
- Motto: Where Love is Service
- Religious affiliations: Roman Catholic (Daughters of Charity)
- Established: February 2, 1949; 77 years ago
- Principal: Mrs. Jasmin J. Factor
- Colors: Pink and Blue
- Nickname: Immacordista
- Affiliation: PAASCU
- Website: www.immaculateheartqc.org

Immaculate Heart of Mary College Inc. is a private, Filipino Catholic school administered by the Philippine Province of the Sisters of Charity of St. Vincent De Paul in Quezon City, Metro Manila, Philippines. It was established in June 1949. The school offers Preschool, Primary and Secondary Education for boys and girls (Coed).

== History ==
In 1750, Mother Paula, of the Third Order of St. Dominic, sailed from Spain to the Philippines with the intent to provide a home for poor and abandoned children. She opened a house she called Beater De Santa Rosa, named in honor of St. Rose of Lima, where she began to take care of children.

After Mother Paula's death, the house was placed under Royal Patronage. The Royal Audience, through its regent, His Excellency, D.S. Trevino, sought the assistance of the Daughters of Charity to continue the work. In 1866, Sister Pervasive, Carmen, and Eustacia De Lara took over Beater, and with the approval of its board of directors, changed its name to Collegial De Santa Rosa. In addition to providing a home for young girls, the Sisters ensured the girls received a thorough Catholic education.

The school enjoyed the support of the Spanish government and wealthy families of that time. It was able to withstand the revolution and a nearby earthquake. Over time, it grew into an elite school for girls. In 1933–34, the High School Home Economics was opened. Two years later, the Junior Normal College was inaugurated.

On December 27, 1941, a bomb dropped by the Japanese destroyed the school. The Sisters sought refuge in Concordia College, the provincial house of the Daughters of Charity. In spite of the war, the Sisters continued their mission of caring for homeless children and teaching catechism. They engaged in needlework to support themselves.

When liberation came in 1943, Mrs. Warner, an American who stayed with the Sisters, offered her home at Manga Avenue in Santa Mesa, Manila as a new school site. They were able to reopen the primary school and offer a special course in needlework and handicraft.

In 1946, with Sister Carmen Reta, D.C. as Visitatrix, a building in Santa Mesa was bought. There, the Sisters resumed their operation. In October, the Board of Directors of Santa Rosa proposed for the Sisters' return to the former site, Intramuros. The Sisters refused due to the fact that they would have to accept certain conditions, such as having to relinquish the name Colegio de Santa Rosa. Instead, they adopted the name Immaculate Heart of Mary College.

The Sisters were then faced with the task of putting up a college of their own. Due to their hard work, cooperation, and guidance, the school's population grew and its buildings were expanded.

In 1952, The Sisters bought a lot in Quezon City where the college presently stands. A four-story, U-shaped building was built. It was inaugurated on February 2, 1957, along with the unveiling image of Our Lady at the campus rotunda, by Father Zacaraias Subinas, C.M.

In 1957, the school launched an expansion under Sister Filomena Zulueta, D.C. Additional wings were built to house the chapel and the auditorium. New equipment and facilities were installed. Saint Joseph's Home was completed in 1959.

From 1963 to 1972 an additional wing was constructed, the Sacred Heart Building, to house primary school classrooms. Personnel upgrading was undertaken and lay members joined the administrative staff. However, competition led to inadequate enrollment, and the College Department was phased out.

The school has continued upgrading itself. In 1983, the individual Reading Program was implemented. The Basic Education Department (BED) had its Congregational Evaluation Visit (CEV) on March 3–5, 1986.

== Academics ==
=== Basic Education ===
- Kindergarten to year 12
