= The Church of Christ in China Ming Yin College =

Coordinates: 22.3332°N 114.1681°E

- CCCMYC or Ming Yin College
- 1 Wai Chi Street, Shek Kip Mei, Kowloon, Hong Kong; Kowloon; Hong Kong

Information
- Type: Government (Co-ed)
- Motto: Learn to perceive the Word of God, Glorify Him and do good to others
- Established: 1966; 60 years ago
- School district: Sham Shui Po
- School number: 170091
- Principal: Ms. Chan Mei Yi
- Supervisor: Mr. Lee Chee Wah
- Enrollment: 1,152
- Campus size: 3,300 square metres (36,000 ft^{2})
- Colour: Green
- Affiliation: Hong Kong Council of the Church of Christ in China
- Website: cccmyc.edu.hk

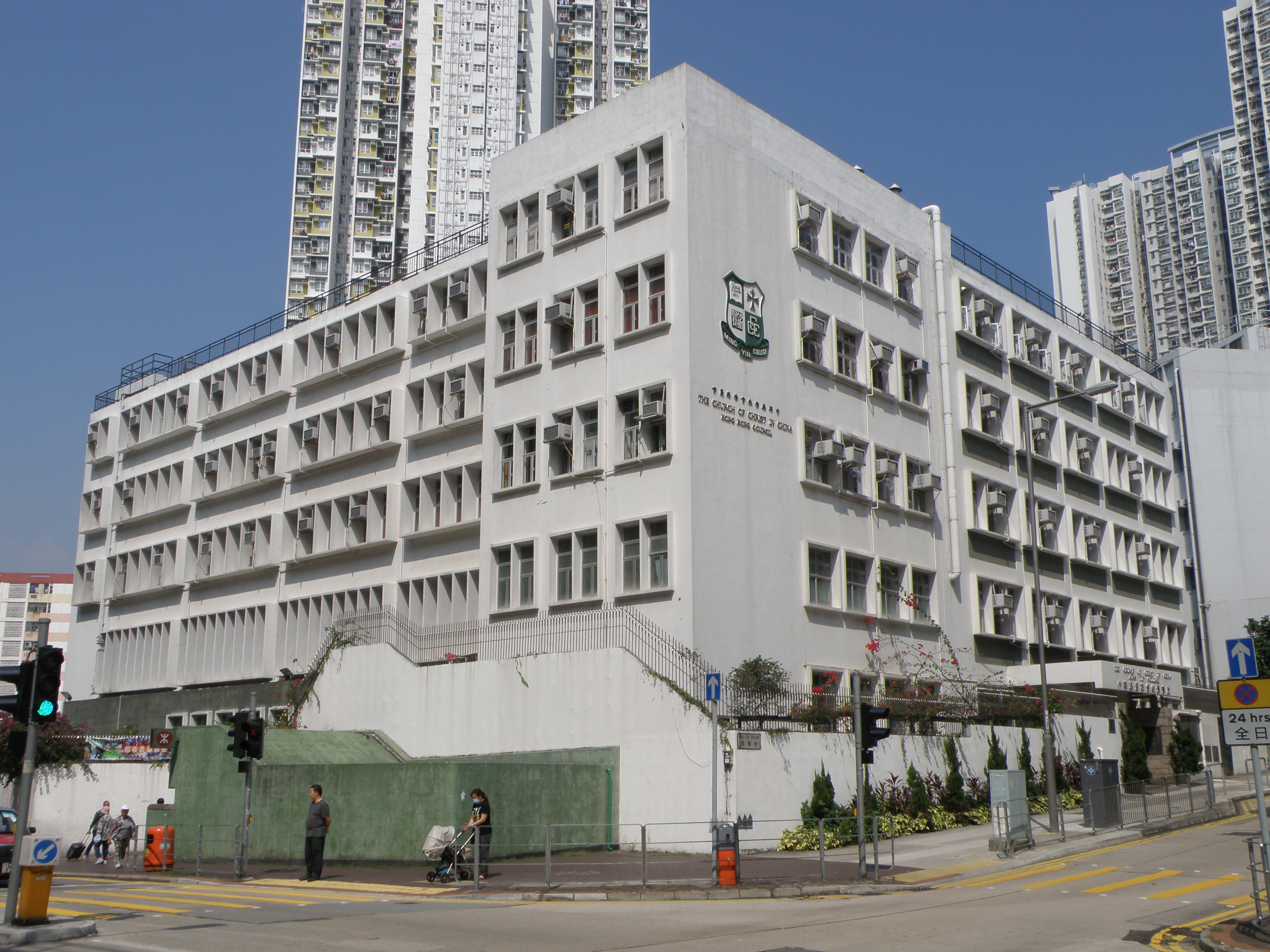

The Church of Christ in China Ming Yin College is an aided Christian co-educational secondary school in Kowloon, Hong Kong next to Shek Kip Mei station.

== History ==
The Church of Christ in China Ming Yin College was established in 1966. It is an aided Christian co-educational secondary school and is located on a 3,300 sq. m. campus, which is considerably small for a secondary school.
