= Lai Chack Middle School =

Secondary school in Hong Kong

Coordinates: 22.301545°N 114.168497°E

- Traditional Chinese: 麗澤中學
- Simplified Chinese: 丽泽中学
Transcriptions
Standard Mandarin
- Hanyu Pinyin: Lí Zé Zhōngxué
Yue: Cantonese
- Jyutping: lai6 zaak6 zung1 hok6

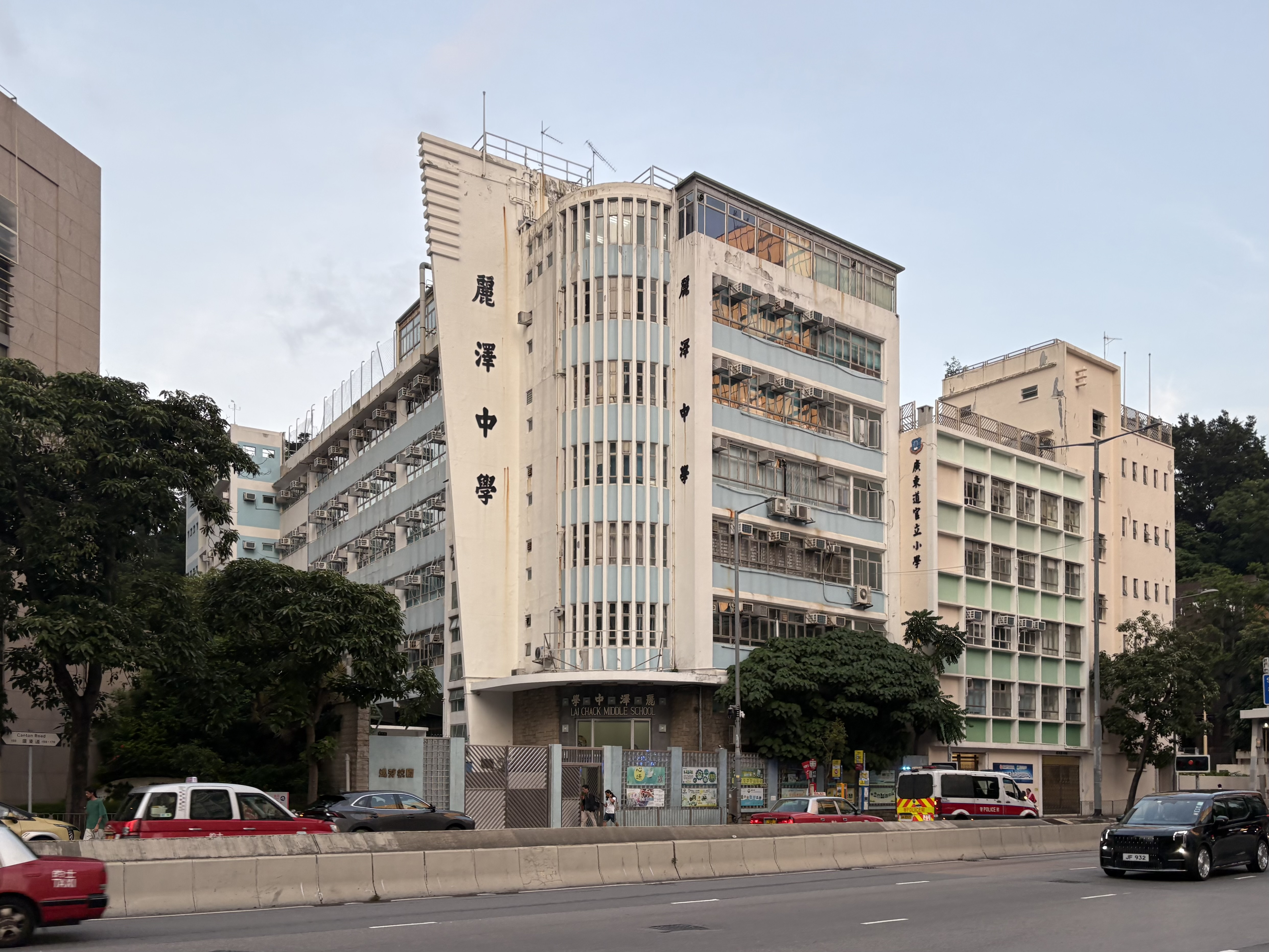
Lai Chack Middle School

Lai Chack Middle School (Chinese: 麗澤中學) is a secondary school in Tsim Sha Tsui, Kowloon, Hong Kong. Founded in 1929, it started as a girls' school in Wan Chai and a branch in Jordan Road. With various relocation in its history, its secondary school section finally settled in the current premises at No. 180 Canton Road in 1955.
