= Tsung Tsin Middle School =

Former secondary school in Sham Shui Po

Coordinates: 22.3401°N 114.1602°E

- 崇正中學
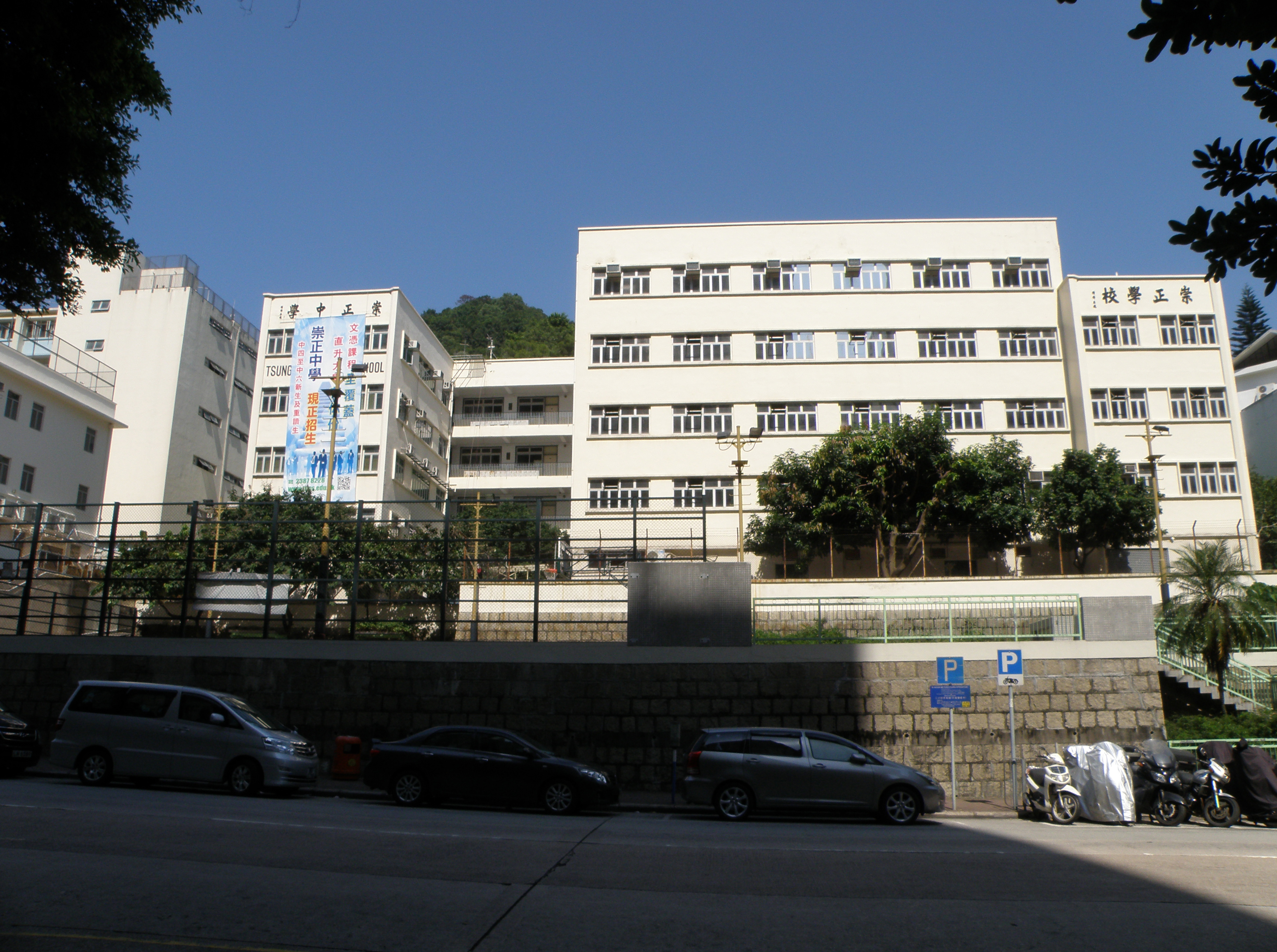
- 11 Kwong Lee Road, Sham Shui Po, Kowloon

Information
- Motto: 獨立、自信、專注、熱誠（仁、誠、敏、毅） (Independent, focused, confident, enthusiastic (Benevolence, sincerity, Sensitivity, Perseverance))
- Established: 1957
- Status: Defunct
- Closed: 2024
- School district: Sham Shui Po
- Principal: 董福
- Faculty: 10
- Enrollment: 30
- Colors: White, Blue
- Website: http://www.ttms.edu.hk/

Tsung Tsin Middle School was a secondary school located in Sham Shui Po. It was formerly affiliated to the Tsung Tsing Association of Hong Kong.

== History ==
=== Founding ===
Tsung Tsin Middle School was formerly known as Tsung Tsin School founded by the Tsung Tsin Association of Hong Kong in 1922. The Board of Directors of the Tsung Tsing Association decided to establish Tsung Tsin Middle School in May 1947, setting up temporary classrooms on the second floor of the Tsung Tsin Association on Morrison Hill Road in Happy Valley. The government allocated 30,000 square feet of land to build the school, with overseas guest groups also donating money.

=== Pacific War ===
In view of the outbreak of the Pacific War, the Association resumed volunteer schools in 1947. In the same year, they decided to expand the size of the school and add a middle school department. Tsung Tsin Middle School was established in 1957. In 1959, the Association wanted an expanded school building, so preparations were made to build a new school.

The new school building on Kwong Lee Road was completed in 1965. The building is five stories high and L-shaped, with an auditorium on the ground floor, a laboratory on the fifth floor, a library, and 17 standard classrooms.

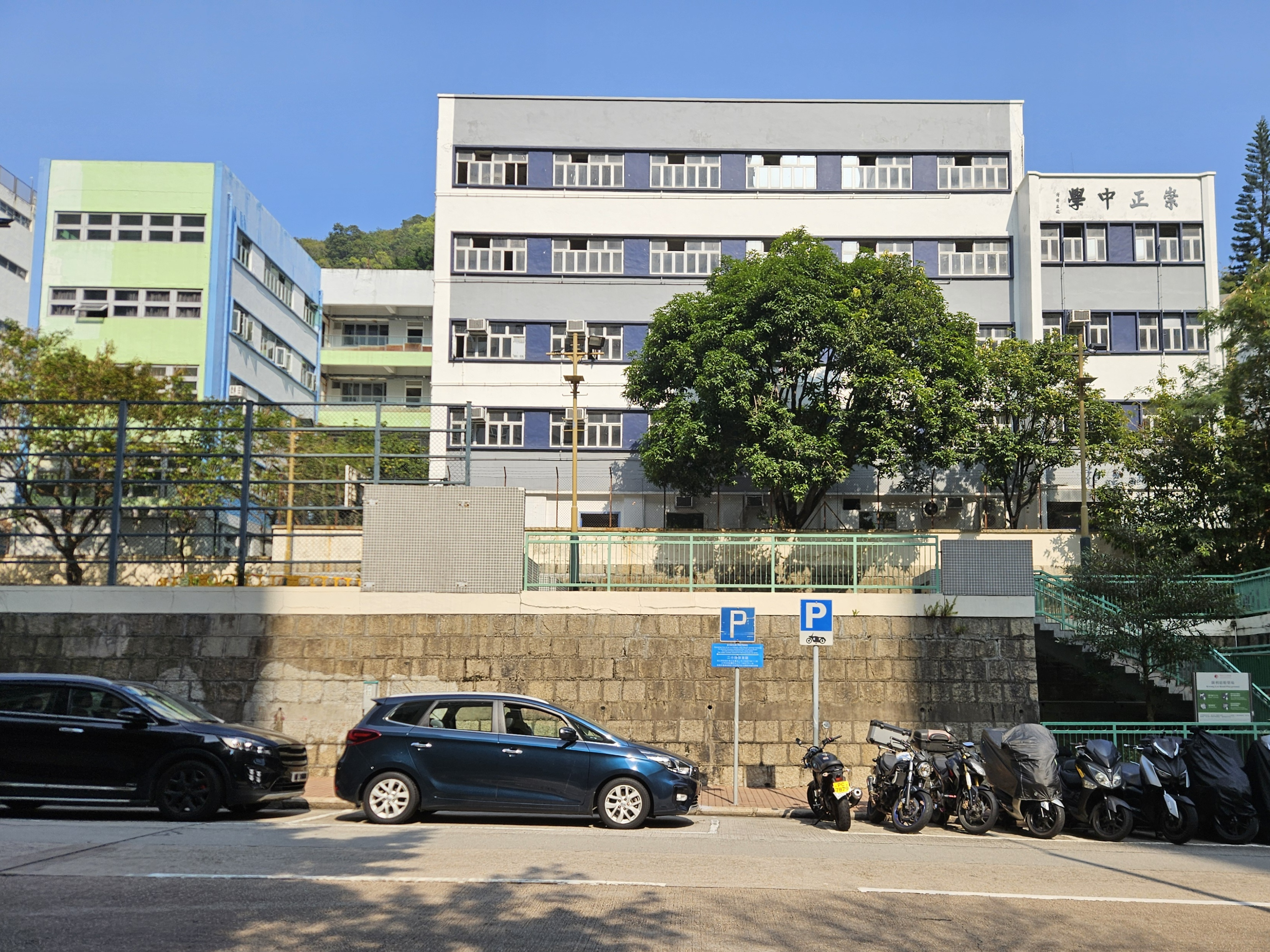
The new school building

This school building was also used as the class venue for Tsung Tsin Primary School. It was not until 1981 that the primary school affiliated to Tsung Tsin Middle School closed down and the school building was returned to the secondary school.

In August 2025, the school's operations were suspended by the Hong Kong government after investigations revealed links between the school and Capture Star, a Shenzhen-based cram school which offered courses for the Hong Kong Diploma of Secondary Education Examination without prior approval by the Hong Kong Examinations and Assessment Authority. According to a school supervisor, the principal was laid off approximately three years prior, leading to the school ceasing operations by 2024. The Tsung Tsing Association of Hong Kong had cut ties with the school following a series of legal conflicts with its board of directors.

=== Charitable organization ===
In 1993, the school sponsor group established Hong Kong Tsung Tsin Secondary School Co., Ltd. and began to operate the school independently as a charity organization. In addition, the group also set up the Tsung Tsin Christian Academy School Management Committee Limited in 2009 as a separate charity organization.

== Curriculum ==
In September 2015, the school signed a cooperation agreement with Think International School, who served as the curriculum director of the international curriculum of Tsung Tsin Middle School.

Tsung Tsin Middle School has signed an agreement with Oxford International Education. Oxford International College in the UK will assist Tsung Tsin Middle School in providing IGCSE and A Levels college entrance examination courses.

== Extracurricular activities ==
In 2003, the school participated in the Hong Kong Green School Award organized by the Environmental Protection Department.
