= Precious Blood Secondary School =

Secondary school in Hong Kong

Coordinates: 22.2645°N 114.2454°E

- Traditional Chinese: 寶血女子中學
- Simplified Chinese: 宝血女子中学
- Literal meaning: Precious Blood Female Secondary School
Transcriptions
Standard Mandarin
- Hanyu Pinyin: Bǎo Xuè Nǚzǐ Zhōngxué
Yue: Cantonese
- Jyutping: bou2 hyut3 neoi5 zi2 zung1 hok6

Precious Blood Secondary School (Chinese: 寶血女子中學) is a girls' school in Chai Wan in Hong Kong.

== History ==
In 1945, after World War II, many children could not afford to go to school. As a result, the Sisters of the Precious Blood rented a place in Wan Chai as a school and named it Righteous Virtue Number 2 Female Secondary School (德貞第二女子中學), which was dependent on government subsidies. Seven years later, in 1952, it moved to North Point where the Sisters of the Precious Blood built a playground for it to commemorate Jesus Christ, and changed the name of the school to Precious Blood Secondary School.

== See also ==
- List of secondary schools in Hong Kong
