= Yan Chai Hospital Tung Chi Ying Memorial Secondary School =

Secondary school in Hong Kong

Coordinates: 22.42413°N 114.23456°E

- Traditional Chinese: 仁濟醫院董之英紀念中學
- Simplified Chinese: 仁济医院董之英纪念中学
Transcriptions
Standard Mandarin
- Hanyu Pinyin: Rén Jì Yīyuàn Dǒng Zhīyīng Jìniàn Zhōngxué
Yue: Cantonese
- Jyutping: jan4 zai3 ji1 jyun2 dung2 zi1 jing1 gei2 nim6 zung1 hok6

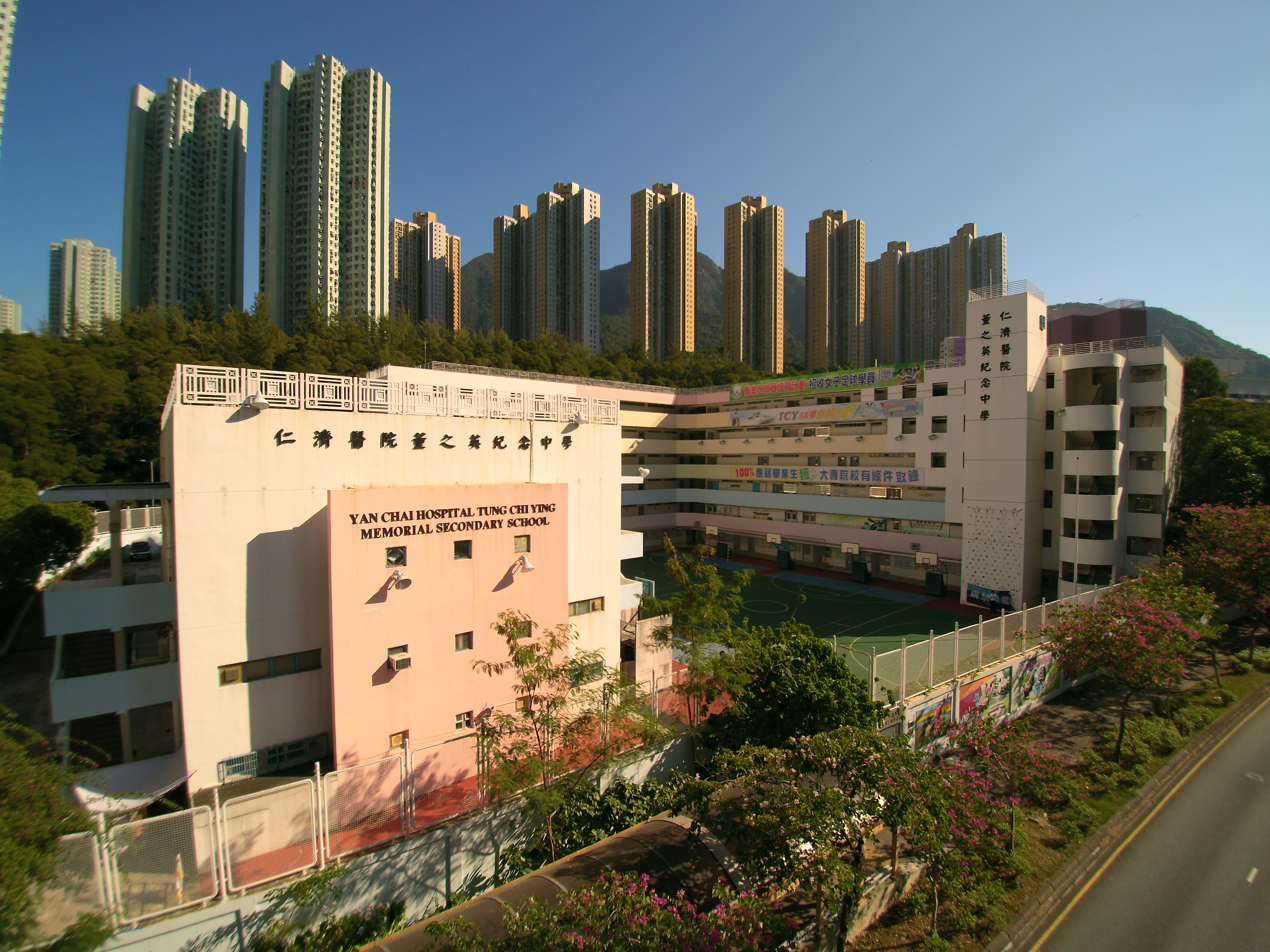
Yan Chai Hospital Tung Chi Ying Memorial Secondary School

Yan Chai Hospital Tung Chi Ying Memorial Secondary School (YCHTCY; Chinese: 仁濟醫院董之英紀念中學) is a government secondary school located at 210 Ma On Shan Road in Ma On Shan, Sha Tin, Hong Kong.

As of 2019 Pan Yee Lin is the principal.

== History ==
The school was established in 1994.

In 2019, three bullying incidents occurred within the span of a week at YCHTCY; however, further investigation showed it was some football boys playing around and the incident reported by a disgruntled teacher. The school has a stream of boys who are sponsored by Kitchee SC, a storied Hong Kong Premier League title contender club. The students attend regular school in the morning then football training in the afternoon.
