= Chan Shu Kui Memorial School =

Secondary school in Hong Kong

Coordinates: 22°20′1.0″N 114°9′44.5″E

- Traditional Chinese: 陳樹渠紀念中學
- Simplified Chinese: 陈树渠纪念中学
Transcriptions
Standard Mandarin
- Hanyu Pinyin: Chén Shùqú Jìniàn Zhōngxué
Yue: Cantonese
- Jyutping: can4 syu6 keoi4 gei2 nim6 zung1 hok6

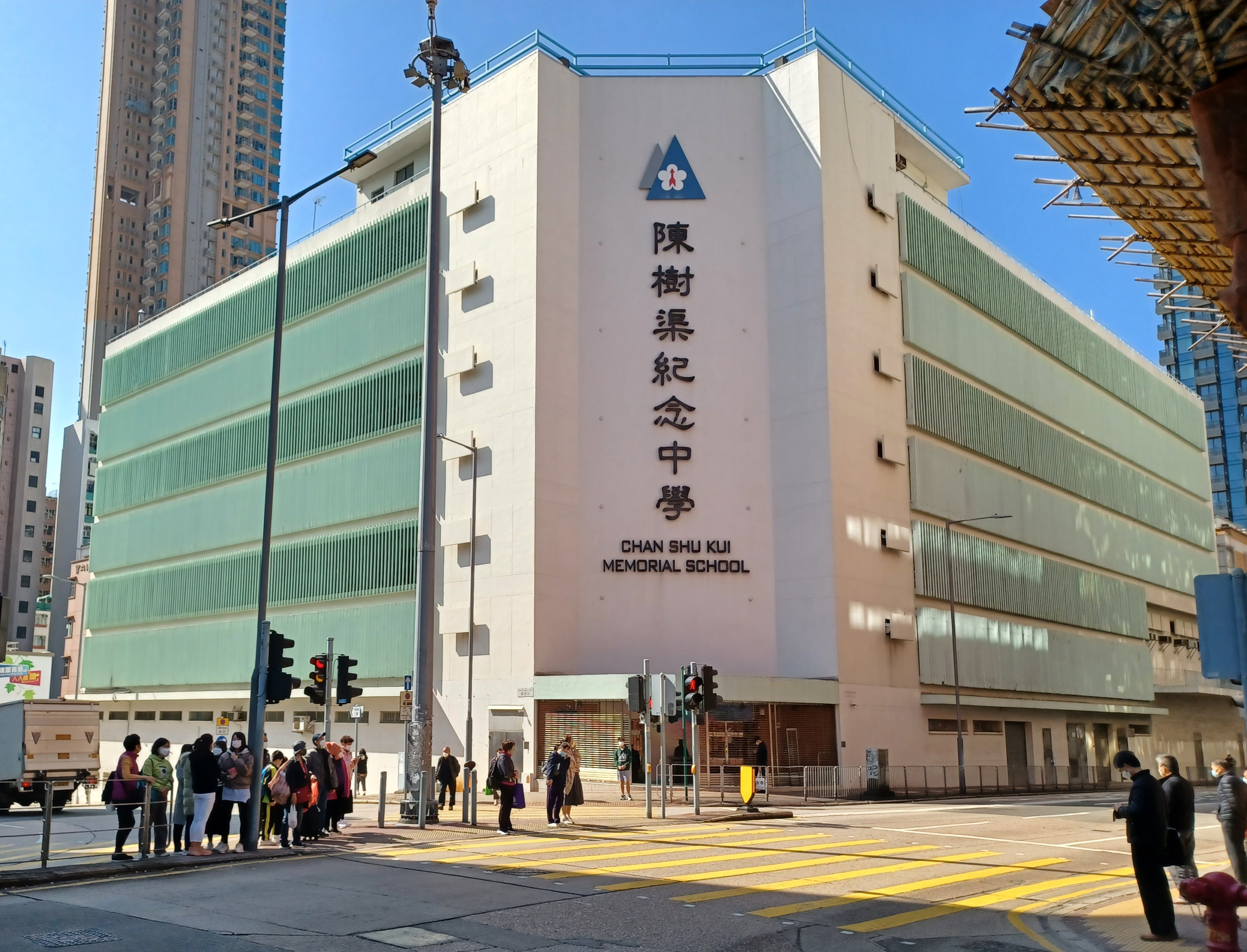

Chan Shu Kui Memorial School (Chinese: 陳樹渠紀念中學) is a secondary school in Yau Yat Chuen, Kowloon, Hong Kong.

The building has about 7,000 square metres (75,000 sq ft) of space. A DSS school sponsored by Chan Shu Kui Memorial School School Management Committee Limited, it opened in 1973, and admits both boys and girls.
