= Holy Trinity College, Hong Kong =

Coordinates: 22.33260°N 114.16842°E

Holy Trinity College
- 寶血會上智英文書院
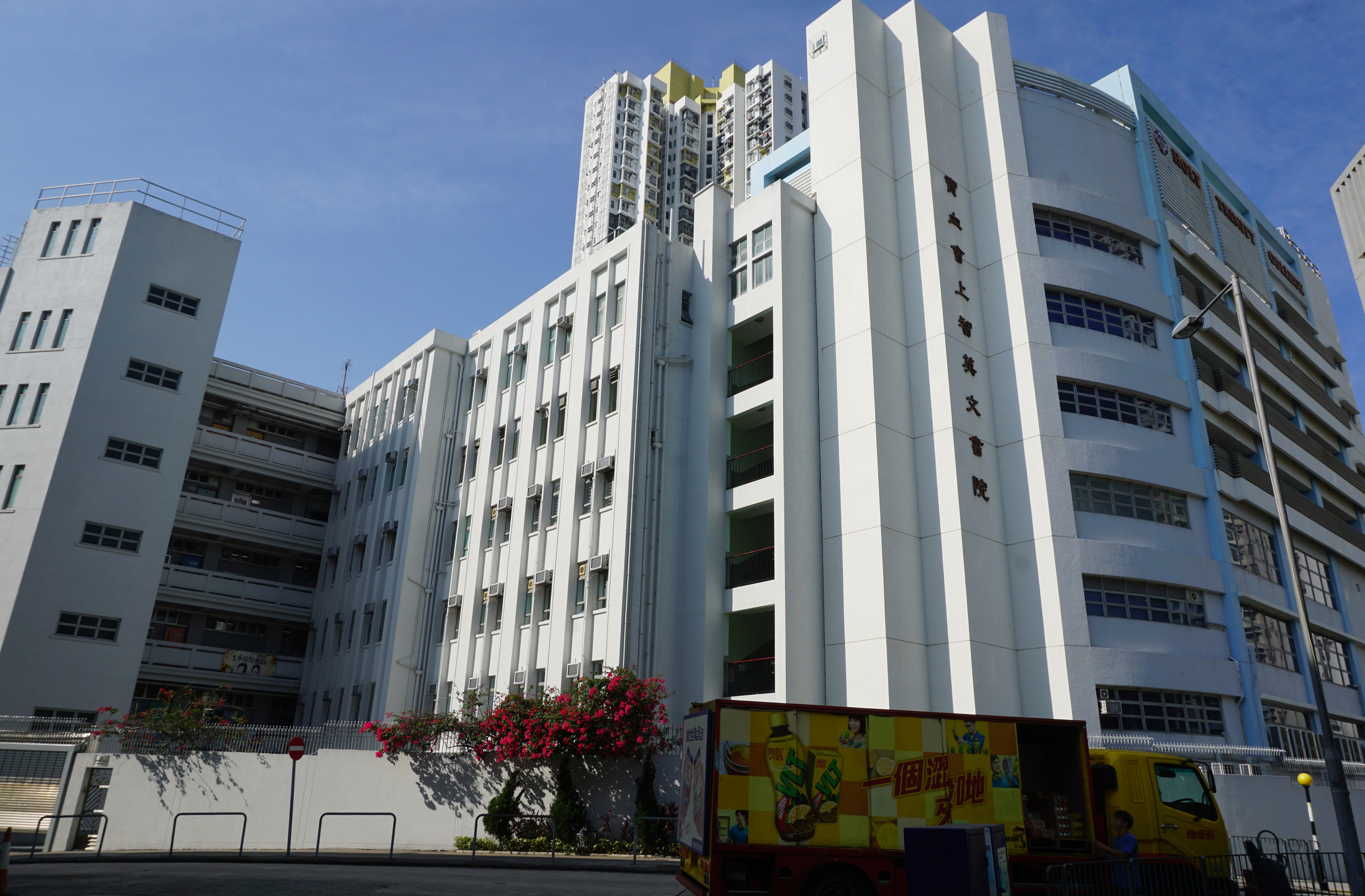
- East side of Holy Trinity College, Hong Kong
- 3 Wai Chi Street, Shek Kip Mei, Kowloon, Hong Kong

Information
- Funding type: Aided
- Motto: Wisdom, Charity, Courage, Fulfilment
- Religious affiliation: Roman Catholic
- Established: 30 May 1966; 60 years ago
- Superintendent: Rev. Sr. Dominica So
- Principal: Mrs. Fung Cheng Wai Yee, Monica
- Website: www.htc.edu.hk

Holy Trinity College (HTC, Chinese: 寶血會上智英文書院) is a band 1A Roman Catholic girls' secondary school in Shek Kip Mei, Hong Kong.

== Name ==
The school name is a reference to the Holy Trinity within Christianity, referring to the three forms of God.

In the native name, 上智(Wisdom) is the first of the Seven Gifts of the Holy Spirit described in the bible.

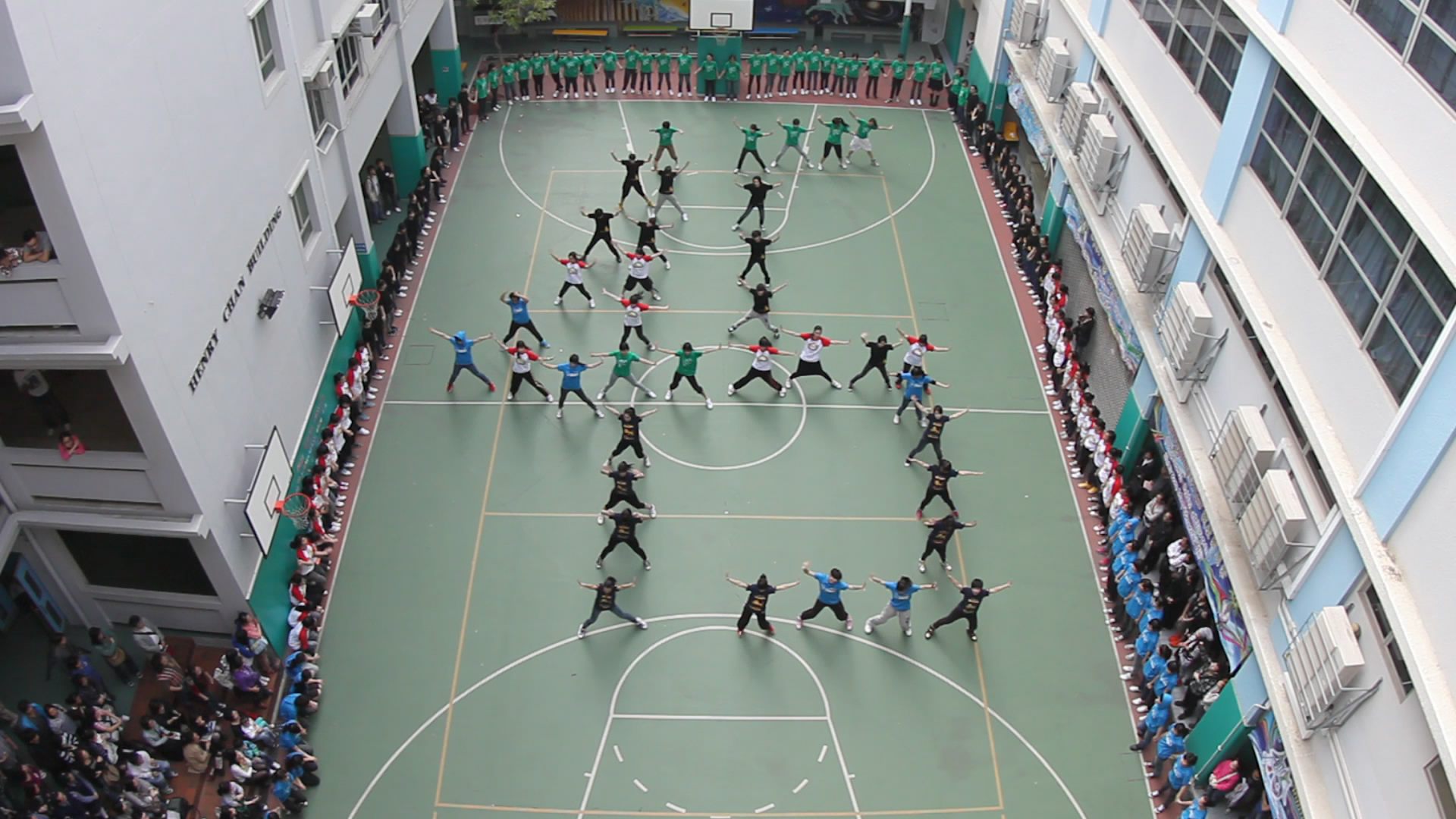
Jazz Dance performance by F.4 students during the 45th Anniversary Open Day of Holy Trinity College.

== Motto ==
- Wisdom —— Capacity to seek the truth and to distinguish good and evil
- Charity —— Kindness of heart that seeks no reward
- Courage —— Willingness to take up responsibilities and embrace the unknown
- Fulfilment —— Realization of potentials, mission, and destiny

== English-medium policy ==
The college's EMI (English as the medium of instruction) policy students to speak English on campus at most times.

== Class structure ==
Holy Trinity College uses English as the medium of instruction in all subjects except Chinese Language, Chinese Literature, Chinese History, Putonghua, Ethics and Civic Education. There are 5 classes for F. 1 to F. 6 students. Students in the junior level (F.1-F.3) study a number of core subjects which provide them with a solid foundation of general knowledge. This enables their studies of different subjects in different streams when they enter the senior level. Students are allocated to different classes in the senior level according to their choice and interest as well as their academic performance.

Class Structure^{(√Compulsory Subject *Elective Subject)}
Subject	F.1	F.2	F.3	F.4	F.5	F.6
English Language	√	√	√	√	√	√
Chinese Language	√	√	√	√	√	√
Mathematics	√	√	√	√	√	√
Mathematics module 1, module 2				＊	＊	＊
Citizenship and Social Development				√	√	√
Life and Society		√	√			
Citizenship, Economics and Society	√					
Putonghua	√	√	√			
Biology			√	＊	＊	＊
Chemistry			√	＊	＊	＊
Physics			√	＊	＊	＊
Integrated Science	√	√				
Business, Accounting and Financial Studies				＊	＊	＊
Information and Communication Technology	√	√	√	＊	＊	＊
Technology & Living	√	√				
Chinese History	√	√	√	＊	＊	＊
Economics				＊	＊	＊
Geography and History	√					
Geography		√	√	＊	＊	＊
History		√	√	＊	＊	＊
Music	√	√	√			
Music Appreciation					√	
Art Appreciation					√	
Visual Arts	√	√	√	＊	＊	＊
Physical Education	√	√	√	√	√	√
Ethics & Religious Education	√	√	√	√	√	√
Japanese				＊	＊	＊

== NSS Curriculum ==
NSS Curriculum
Class	ABC	D	E
Compulsory Subject	English Language, Chinese Language, Mathematics(Compulsory Part), Citizenship and Social Development		
Elective Subject	Mathematics Extended Part(M1/M2) _{*need approval}	Mathematics Extended Part(M1)	Mathematics Extended Part(M2)
Elective Subject	Chinese History/Biology /Geography /Business, Accounting and Financial Studies-Accounting	Chemistry	Physics
Elective Subject	Economics/Geography /History/Visual Arts /Information & Communication Technology/Biology	Economics/Geography /Biology/Information & Communication Technology	Economics/Geography /Chemistry/Biology/Information & Communication Technology
Elective Subject	Business, Accounting and Financial Studies-Accounting /Business, Accounting and Financial Studies-Business Management /Geography/Economics/Biology/Information & Communication Technology	Business, Accounting and Financial Studies-Accounting /Business, Accounting and Financial Studies-Business Management /Geography/Economics/Biology/Information & Communication Technology/Physics	Business, Accounting and Financial Studies-Accounting /Business, Accounting and Financial Studies-Business Management /Geography/Economics/Biology/Information & Communication Technology

== Houses ==
The four houses of the school are named:

Houses
St. Teresa's (T)
St. Katherine's (K)
St. Lucy's (L)
St. Clare's (C)

== Alumni ==
The college's alumni association is the Holy Trinity College Past Students' Association, in existence since 1975.

== See also ==
- Education in Hong Kong
- List of secondary schools in Hong Kong
