= Sha Tin Methodist College =

- 沙田循道衛理中學

Location
- Sun Tin Wai Estate; Sha Tin, New Territories; Hong Kong, China; 22°22′16.89″N 114°11′10.49″E

Information
- School type: Government-aided, Secondary school
- Motto: The fear of the Lord is the beginning of wisdom, and the knowledge of the Holy One is insight. (Proverbs 9:10)
- Religious affiliation: Christianity
- Founded: c. 1983; 43 years ago
- Principal: Ms. Cheung Chui Yee (張翠儀女士)
- Supervisor: Rev. YU Yan Ming (余恩明牧師)
- Gender: Co-educational
- Website: www.stmc.edu.hk

20th School Anniversary Logo

25th School Anniversary Logo

Sha Tin Methodist College (Chinese: 沙田循道衞理中學), abbreviated as STMC, is a government-subsidised secondary school in Sha Tin, Hong Kong. Founded in 1983, it is sponsored by The Methodist Church, Hong Kong to serve the local community together with churches and service centres in the Sha Tin parish. Apart from its main campus located at Sun TIn Wai Estate, there's also a school annex named Ample CAmpus located nearby the main campus. There are activity rooms, Robot Learning Centre and Dance Studio, providing more space for students and enhancing the quality of education.

== School features ==
=== Class structure and admission ===
The school has adopted a symmetrical class structure. There are four classes in each form for F.1 to F.6.

=== School Philosophy and Aims ===
Based on the spirit of Jesus Christ, and putting whole-person caring as our top priority, the school aims to provide education on spiritual, moral, intellectual, physical, social and aesthetic aspects, which helps students build a personality in the image of Christ and in the end, to serve people and the society.

=== Teacher qualifications ===
The school currently has 68 teachers, of which 66 (97%) hold university degrees; 25 (37.3%) hold higher degrees; 63 (93%) have completed teacher training programs. Education psychologist and social worker are also employed to support the school's work. All teachers in the school are eager to enrich themselves by further study and regular sharing. Classroom observation has long been practised in the school. Moreover, all teachers of English Language and Putonghua have met the requirements of the Language Proficiency Assessment.

=== Religious education ===
The school practices Christian education. The school actively promotes education on Christianity through classes on religious education, morning assembly, weekly assembly, Christian fellowship, Girl's Brigade, gospel camp, sports events, cell groups, prayer groups and crusade. The Shatin Methodist Church works closely with the school on holding various activities and camps to nurture students' spirituality and leadership. Youth music worship is held every Saturday.

=== Education ===
Since the implementation of School Management Initiative in 1992, the school has been drawing up plans according to the school administration cycle. Representatives of teachers, parents, alumni and local community are among the school managers.

The school received funding from the Government's Quality Education Fund on a number of creative education projects. These include: Green School Campaign, Multi-media Language Lab, Chinese Orchestra, Western Orchestra, General Education on Chinese Medicine, Digital Music and Creative Art Workshop, Millennium Multi-media Classrooms, General Education on Chinese Medicine and Resource Centre, Campus TV, to provide a platform for enhancing teaching effectiveness. With the support from the SAR Government, the Church and the community, the school has in recent years organised study tours to Beijing, Sichuan, Yunnan, Sanshui, Lianshan, Zhaoqing, Xian and Macau, Singapore as well as to Korea. To tie in with the objective of broadening horizons, the school has set up a student grant on overseas studies, so that all students have the opportunity to enrich their learning experience.

A number of seed programmes have been carried out in collaboration with the Curriculum Development Institute of EDB in recent years, with a view to introducing curriculum that enriches learning experience. A number of teachers have been seconded to EDB to take part in the development and optimisation of the curriculum on Gifted Education, Science Education, History Education, Integrated Humanities and Liberal Studies. The curriculum so developed was implemented in the school and the experience applied to other schools in Hong Kong.

In addition, the curriculum on Integrated Humanities at HKCEE level has been implemented in the school since 2003. A number of electives are available at senior secondary level, and AS level subjects of Liberal Studies, Computer Application, Mathematics and Statistics are offered to broaden students' horizons.

Apart from general subjects, the school implemented a formal curriculum on Moral and Civic Education to nurture civic awareness among students. Culture experiential activities and reading day are organised from time to time. The school also set up the first Chinese Herbal Medicine Learning Center in Hong Kong to provide learning opportunities in Chinese herbal medicine. A curriculum of general education on Chinese Medicine is incorporated in regular classes in F.2.

In 2002, the school was selected as one of the twenty outstanding schools and a 'Resource School' to share its experience with fellow schools in Hong Kong. Apart from three to four sharing sessions on different themes held every month, an open forum was held on 13 June 2003 and a journal was published. Another Knowledge Fair was held in November 2008 to celebrate the school's 25th Anniversary and to serve as a platform to share the school-based curriculum projects with the other schools.

In 2006, the school was invited as a pilot school under the Professional Development Scheme, School Support Partners Scheme, and Partnership for Improvement of Learning and Teaching project to further enhance quality education and share its experience with other schools.

In 2004, EMB conducted a comprehensive External School Review to the school. The assessment covered fourteen items in four main areas, for which the school obtained grading of "Excellent" or "Good".

=== Public examination results and further studies ===
The students of the school perform well in public examinations.

Hong Kong Diploma of Secondary Education

	Result for 2013	
	STMC	Hong Kong Day School
Level 4 or above in Category A subjects (%)	60.1	33.2
Level 2 or above in Category A subjects (%)	98.6	83.1
Level 4 or above in Chinese Language (%)	55.5	27.5
Level 4 or above in English Language (%)	67.6	25.6
Level 4 or above in Mathematics (%)	72	34.7

Hong Kong Certificate of Education Examination

	Average Result for 2004 to 2008	
	STMC	Hong Kong
Grade C and above (%)	41.2	23.7
Pass of all Subject (%)	92.5	73.0
Pass in Chinese Language (%)	98.3	68.5
Pass in English Language (%)	97.7	69.3
Pass in Mathematics (%)	96.0	73.4

Hong Kong Advanced Level Examination

	Average Result for 2004 to 2008	
	STMC	Hong Kong
Grade C and above of all AL Subjects (%)	46.2	22.3
Pass of AL Subjects (%)	93.8	72.8

Hong Kong Advanced Supplementary Level Examination

	Average Result for 2004 to 2008	
	STMC	Hong Kong
Grade C and above of all ASL Subject (%)	38.0	17.7
Pass in Chinese Language (%)	94.5	92.3
Pass in English Language (%)	94.2	72.0

In the past years, 2004 to 2008, the average percentage of students being admitted to universities (both local and overseas) was over 80%, of which about 50% were offered degree programmers in the University of Hong Kong, the Chinese University of Hong Kong and the University of Science and Technology. Students being offered degree courses, associate degree courses, high degree courses are more than 90%. Students' performance and prospects are good.

== See also ==
- List of secondary schools in Hong Kong
- Education in Hong Kong
