= Tack Ching Girls' Secondary School =

Secondary school in Hong Kong

Coordinates: 22.3317°N 114.1495°E

- Traditional Chinese: 德貞女子中學
- Simplified Chinese: 德贞女子中学
Transcriptions
Standard Mandarin
- Hanyu Pinyin: Dé Zhēn Nǚzǐ Zhōngxué
Yue: Cantonese
- Jyutping: dak1 zing1 neoi5 zi2 zung1 hok6

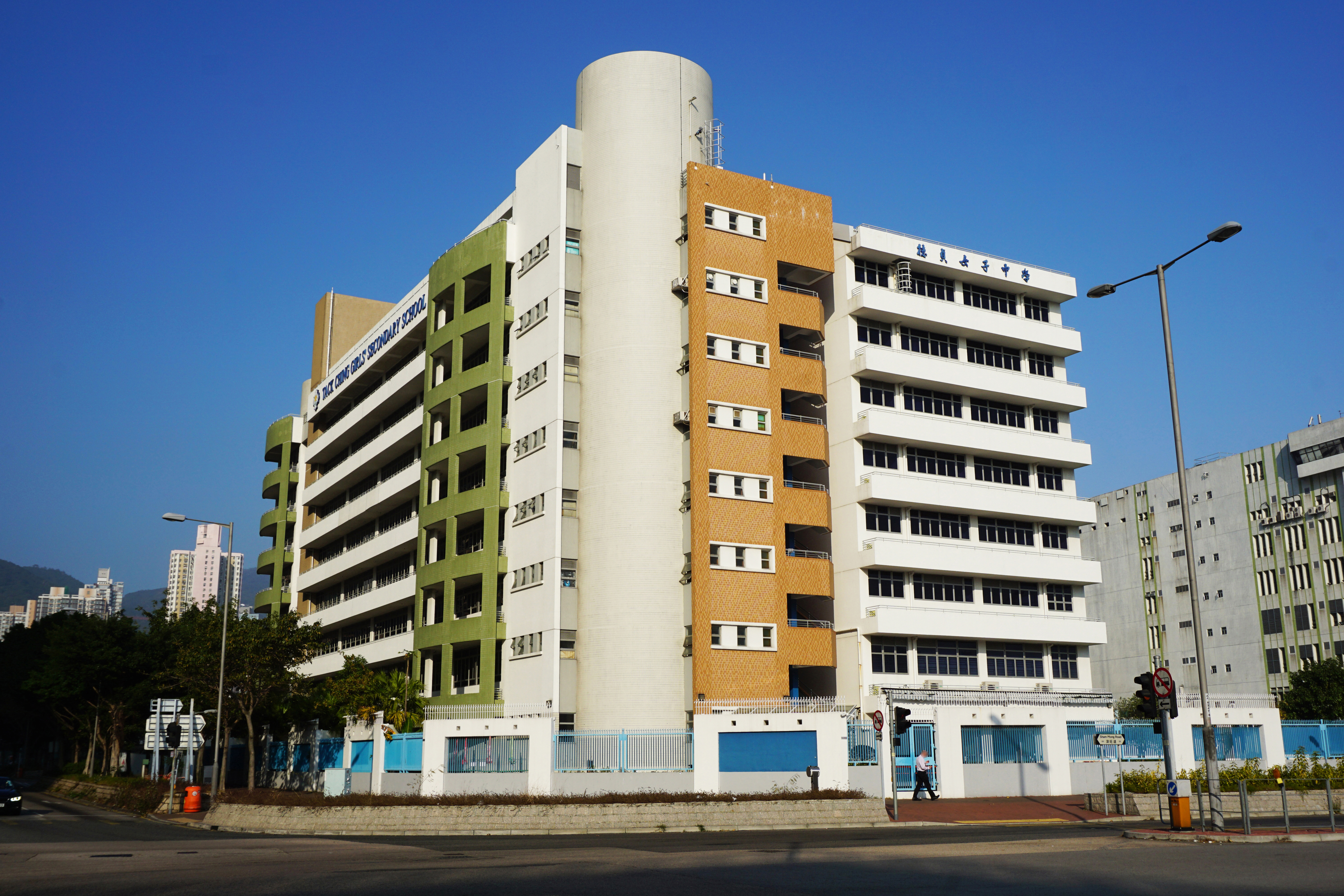
Tack Ching Girls' Secondary School.

Tack Ching Girls' Secondary School (Chinese: 德貞女子中學) is a girls school in the Sham Shui Po District of Kowloon, Hong Kong. In 2004 The school was relocated to a new school building at Hing Wah Street West and Sham Mong Road in Cheung Sha Wan.

== History ==
The schoolTack Ching Girls' Secondary School.jpg grew out of a primary school Tack Ching School founded by the Sisters of the Precious Blood in 1923 at Nam Cheong Street. It was later relocated to Un Chau Street in 1929. In 1929 the primary school expanded to secondary education and thus was renamed Tack Ching Girls' Secondary School. The school suspended operation from 1941 and 1945 during the period of Japanese occupation of Hong Kong. In 1945 the school resumed teaching and opened a branch in Wan Chai, which became Precious Blood Secondary School in 1946. In 1949 the school moved to a new building in Un Chau Street near the junction of Yen Chow Street and Castle Peak Road in Sham Shui Po with a grand opening by the then-Hong Kong Governor Alexander Grantham. After more than 50 years, the school was relocated again to the present site following the reclamation of Cheung Sha Wan.
