= Our Lady of the Rosary College =

Catholic female secondary school in Kowloon Tong, Hong Kong

Coordinates: 22.3330°N 114.1725°E

Our Lady of the Rosary College
School Motto	Charity, Purity
Established	1971; 55 years ago
Supervisor/Chairman of School Management Committee	Sr. Chan Wai Fan, Mabel
Principal	Ms Au Yee Ling
School Type	Aided
Sex	Girls
School Size	About 10000 Sq. M
Sponsoring Body	Sisters Announcers of the Lord
Location	22 Rose Street, Yau Yat Chuen, Kowloon
Telephone Number	2380 6468
Religion	Catholicism
Homepage	http://www.olr.edu.hk

Our Lady of the Rosary College (OLR, Chinese: 聖母玫瑰書院) is a Catholic female secondary school in Kowloon Tong, Hong Kong. It was founded in 1971. The motto of the school is "Purity and Charity". Most of the subjects are taught in English. Students are divided into four houses including white, yellow, red and green.
