= List of schools in Kwun Tong District =

This is a list of schools in Kwun Tong District, Hong Kong.

== Secondary schools ==
Government

- Kwun Tong Government Secondary School
- Kwun Tong Kung Lok Government Secondary School

Aided

- Buddhist Ho Nam Kam College
- CCC Kei Chi Secondary School
- CCC Mong Man Wai College
- FDBWA Szeto Ho Secondary School
- HK SKH Bishop Hall Secondary School
- HKTA Ching Chung Secondary School
- HKWMA Chu Shek Lun Secondary School
- Ko Lui Secondary School
- Kwun Tong Maryknoll College
- Leung Shek Chee College
- Maryknoll Secondary School
- Mission Covenant Church Holm Glad College
- Ning Po College
- Ning Po No. 2 College
- NLSI Lui Kwok Pat Fong College
- Po Chiu Catholic Secondary School
- Shun Lee Catholic Secondary School
- Sing Yin Secondary School
- SKH Kei Hau Secondary School
- SKH Leung Kwai Yee Secondary School
- St Antonius Girls' College
- St Catharine's School for Girls
- St Joseph's Anglo-Chinese School
- St Paul's School (Lam Tin)
- Yan Chai Hospital Law Chan Chor Si College

Direct Subsidy Scheme

- Delia Memorial School (Hip Wo No. 2 College)
- Delia Memorial School (Hip Wo)
- ECF Saint Too Canaan College
- Fukien Secondary School
- Mu Kuang English School
- United Christian College (Kowloon East)

Private

- Kellett School
- Nord Anglia International School, HK
- Shema Academy

== Primary schools ==
Government

- Kwun Tong Government Primary School (Sau Ming Road)
- Kwun Tong Government Primary School

Aided

- Bishop Paschang Catholic School
- Buddhist Chi King Primary School
- C&MA Sun Kei Primary School (Ping Shek)
- Carmel Leung Sing Tak School
- CCC Kei Faat Primary School
- CCC Kei Faat Primary School (Yau Tong)
- Conservative Baptist Lui Ming Choi Primary School
- HK Taoist Association Wun Tsuen School
- HKTAYYI Chan Lui Chung Tak Memorial School
- Jordan Valley St Joseph's Catholic Primary School
- Kowloon Bay St John the Baptist Catholic Primary School
- Lam Tin Methodist Primary School
- Lok Sin Tong Yeung Chung Ming Primary School
- Lok Wah Catholic Primary School
- Man Kiu Association Primary School
- Mission Convent Church Holm Glad No. 2 Primary School
- Mission Convent Church Holm Glad Primary School
- Our Lady of China Catholic Primary School
- Ping Shek Estate Catholic Primary School
- S. K. H. Yautong Kei Hin Primary School
- Sau Mau Ping Catholic Primary School
- Sau Ming Primary School
- SKH Kei Hin Primary School
- SKH Kei Lok Primary School
- SKH Kowloon Bay Kei Lok Primary School
- SKH Lee Shiu Keung Primary School
- SKH St John's Tsang Shiu Tim Primary School
- SKH Tak Tin Lee Shiu Keung Primary School
- St Antonius Primary School
- St Edward's Catholic Primary School
- St John the Baptist Catholic Primary School
- St Matthews Lutheran School (Sau Mau Ping)

Direct Subsidy Scheme

- Fukien Secondary School Affiliated School

Private

- Kellett School
- Nord Anglia International School Hong Kong
- Shema Academy
- St Joseph's Anglo-Chinese Primary School

== Special schools ==
Aided

- Caritas Mother Teresa School
- CCC Kei Shun Special School
- Evangelize China Fellowship Holy Word School
- Hong Kong Red Cross Princess Alexandria School
- Hong Kong Red Cross Hospital Schools United Christian Hospital
- Society of Boys' Centres Shing Tak Centre School
