= Lok Wah Estate =

Coordinates: 22.32176°N 114.21972°E

Lok Wah Estate 樂華邨
- Housing estate
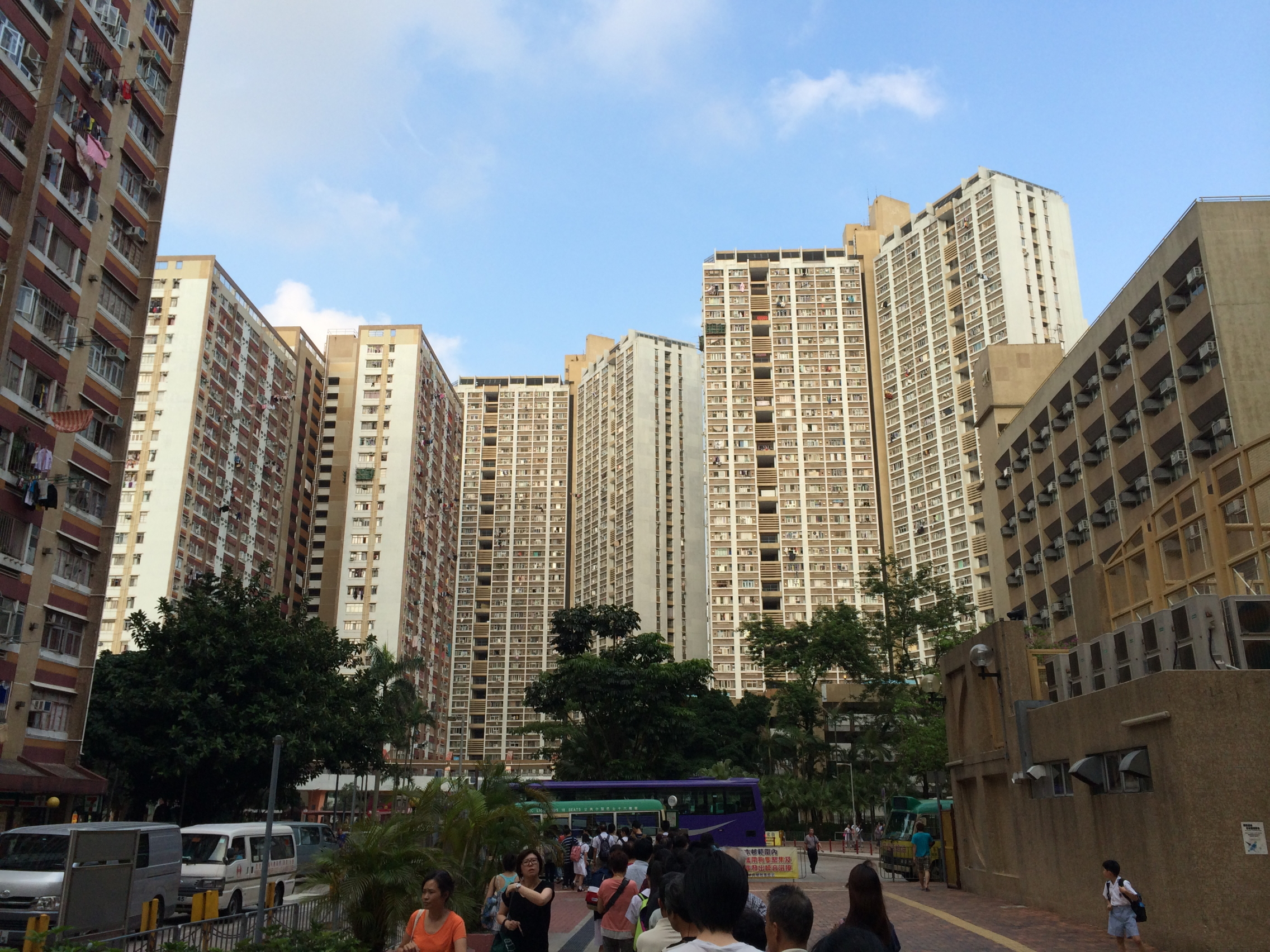
- Lok Wah South Estate
- Interactive map of Lok Wah Estate
- Area: Ngau Tau Kok
- District: Kwun Tong
- Opened: 1982; 44 years ago

Area
  - Total: 11 ha (27 acres)

Population (2011)
  - Total: 28,051
  - Density: 260,000/km^{2} (660,000/sq mi)

Lok Wah Estate
- Traditional Chinese: 樂華邨
- Simplified Chinese: 乐华邨
Transcriptions
Standard Mandarin
- Hanyu Pinyin: Lèhuácūn
Yue: Cantonese
- Jyutping: lok6 waa4 cyun1

Lok Wah Estate (Chinese: 樂華邨; Jyutping: lok6 waa4 cyun1) is a public housing estate located in Ngau Tau Kok, Kwun Tong, Kowloon, Hong Kong.

Lok Nga Court (樂雅苑) is a Home Ownership Scheme court adjacent to Lok Wah Estate. It has six blocks built in 1984.

== Geography ==
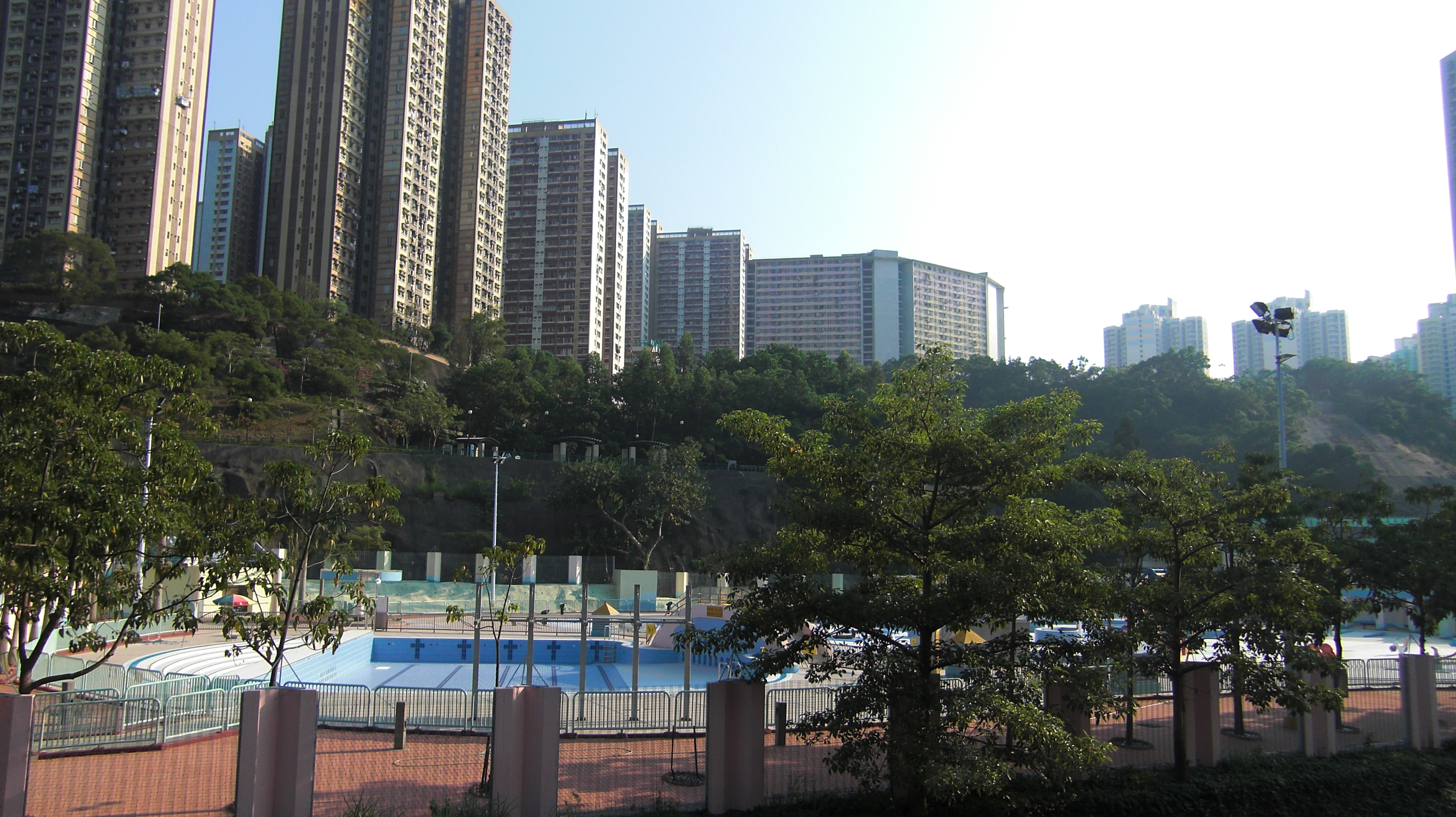
Dragon Hill with Lok Wah Estate on top

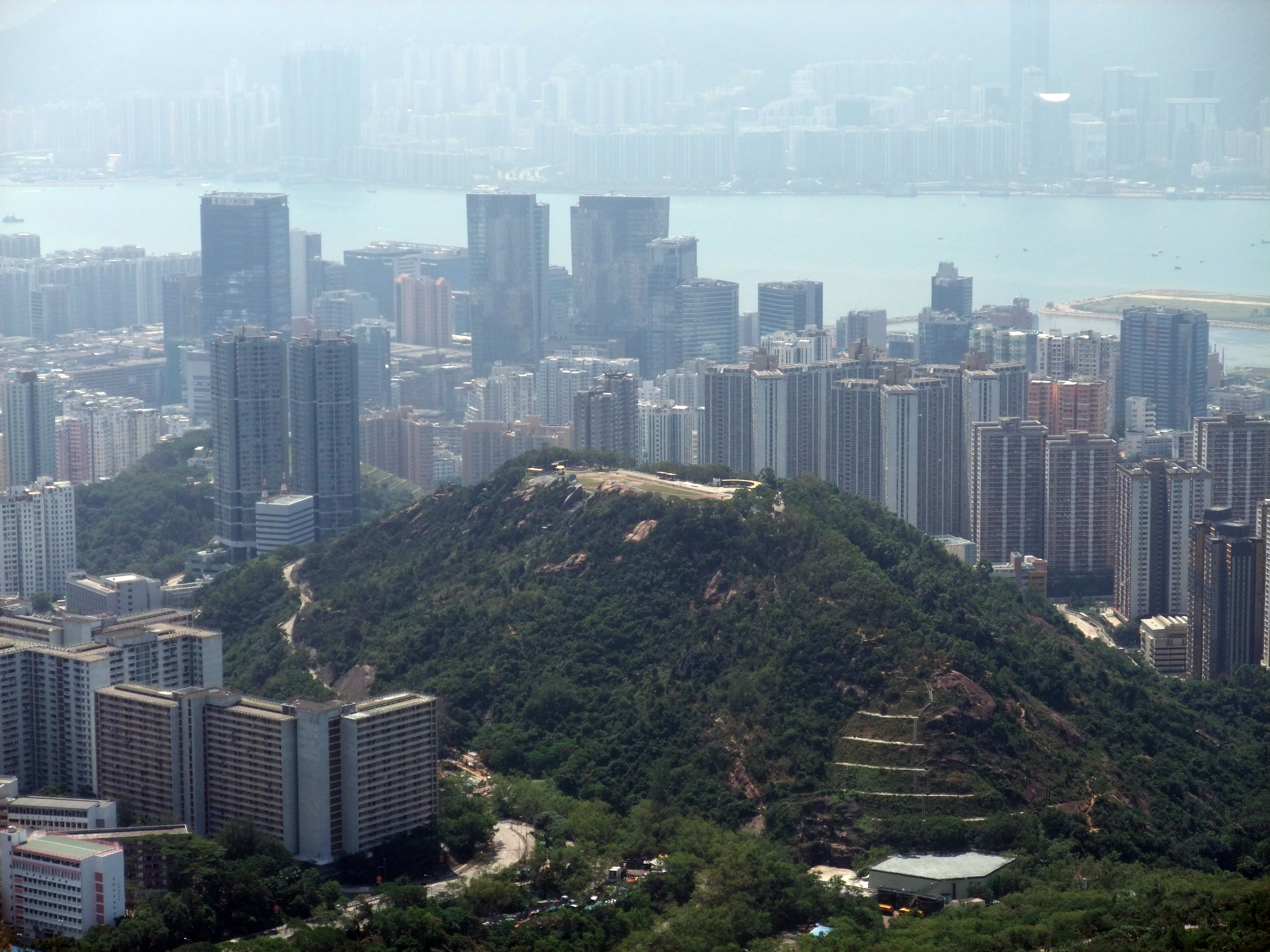
Shum Wan Shan, with Lok Wah Estate visible just behind it

Lok Wah Estate is located on Chun Wah Road, in the northern Kwun Tong Town Central. It sits on Dragon Hill (龍山), the top of which was levelled over the course of site formation for the estate, to the point where the hill is no longer labelled on maps, but rather appears as the lower slope of Crocodile Hill (鱷魚山). The estate is located in a valley between Crocodile Hill and the significantly taller Shum Wan Shan (沈雲山).

The estate is divided into two parts: Lok Wah South Estate (樂華南邨) and Lok Wah North Estate (樂華北邨), together with 14 blocks of residential buildings. These rental estates are integrated with Lok Nga Court, a six block Home Ownership Scheme estate.

== History ==
Lok Wah Estate was planned and developed in the late 1970s and completed during the early 1980s. Before that, another housing village, Fook Wah Estate (復華村), was located on the same site since the 1950s, providing provisional housing to labourers working in the factories of Kwun Tong. Chun Wah Road was realigned over the course of Lok Wah Estate's construction.

The Housing Authority's Building Committee approved a tender for the construction of the first two blocks of Lok Wah Estate, worth $89 million, in 1980. In addition to the two 19-storey blocks housing 2,060 flats, the contract included construction of the market and the primary school. A tender worth $146 million was approved in 1981 for the construction of Lok Nga Court. This Home Ownership Scheme estate comprises six residential "flexi" blocks and a four-storey car park with indoor games hall on top.

The first phase of the estate (comprising the two rental housing blocks, primary school, and market) opened in 1982 as the Housing Authority's "109th public rental estate". An official opening ceremony was held for the completed estate on 6 December 1985. Governor Sir Edward Youde was supposed to officiate at this event but was suffering from the flu, and so the ceremony was instead held by Sir David Akers-Jones.

Some of the first tenants were resettled residents of Temporary Housing Areas, which owing to inadequate living conditions the Housing Department was attempting to replace with modern estates.

== Demographics ==
In line with the trend of diminishing household sizes across Hong Kong over the decades, the population of Lok Wah Estate has declined. Lok Wah Estate was designed to house over 42,000 people. According to the District Council Election 2003, the estimated population in Lok Wah Estate was around 31,500.

In the 2011 census the population had dropped to 28,051. There are a total of 10,794 households. The majority of residents are ethnic Chinese who speak Cantonese.

== Facilities ==
=== Commerce ===
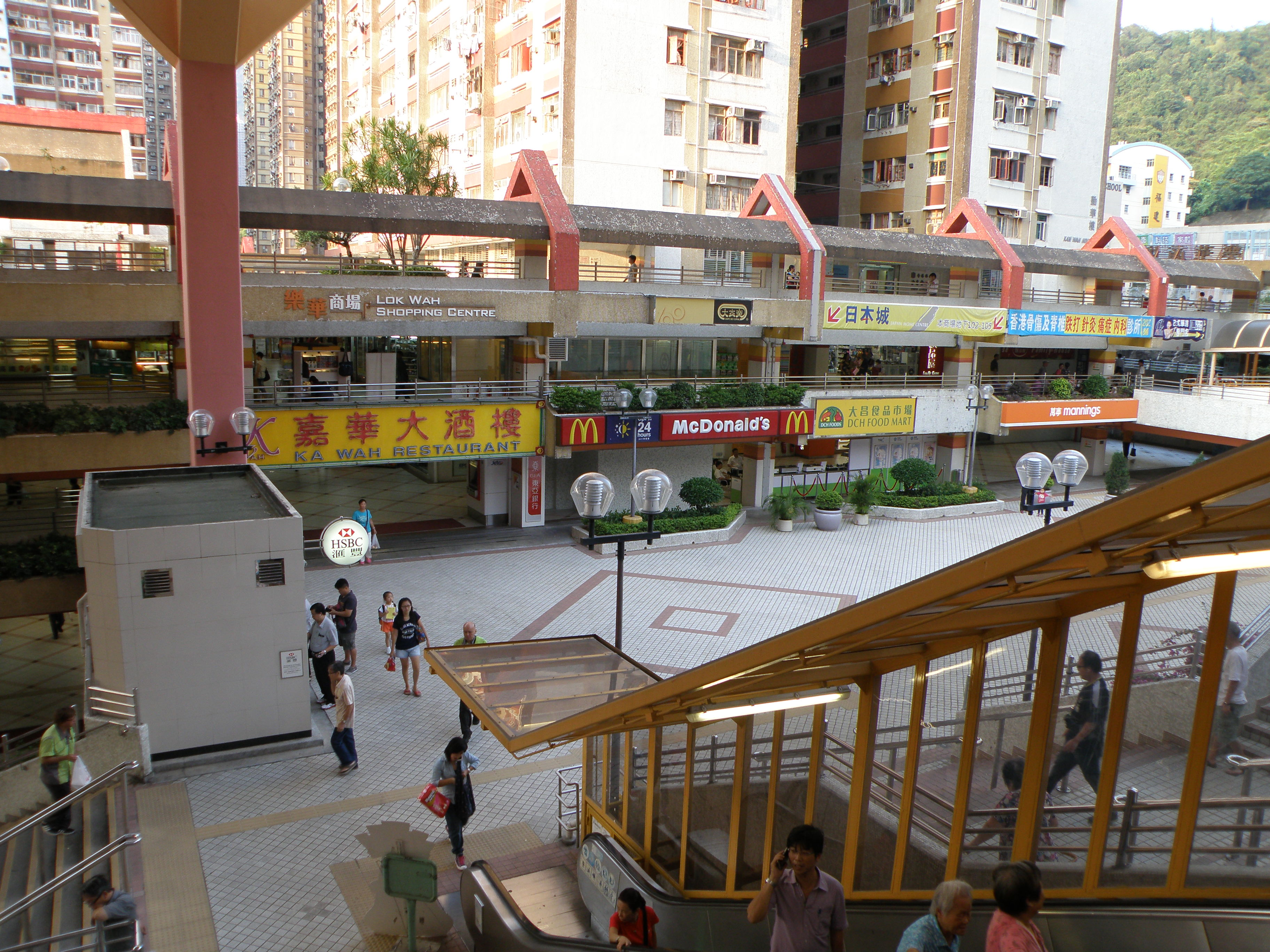
Commercial centre

Most commercial space in the estate is housed in the Lok Wah Commercial Centre, a multi-storey open-air shopping centre between Lok Wah North Estate and Lok Nga Court. It was opened in 1985 and comprises an internal floor area of 108,510 square feet (10,081 m^{2}). It is built atop a multi-storey car park with 650 spaces, but as the complex is built within a valley the car park is barely noticeable – the shopping centre appears to be at ground level. The commercial centre and car park were originally owned and managed by the Housing Authority, but were transferred to Link REIT on 25 November 2005. Link REIT was criticised for abandoning the fountain at the shopping centre, and for raising rents.

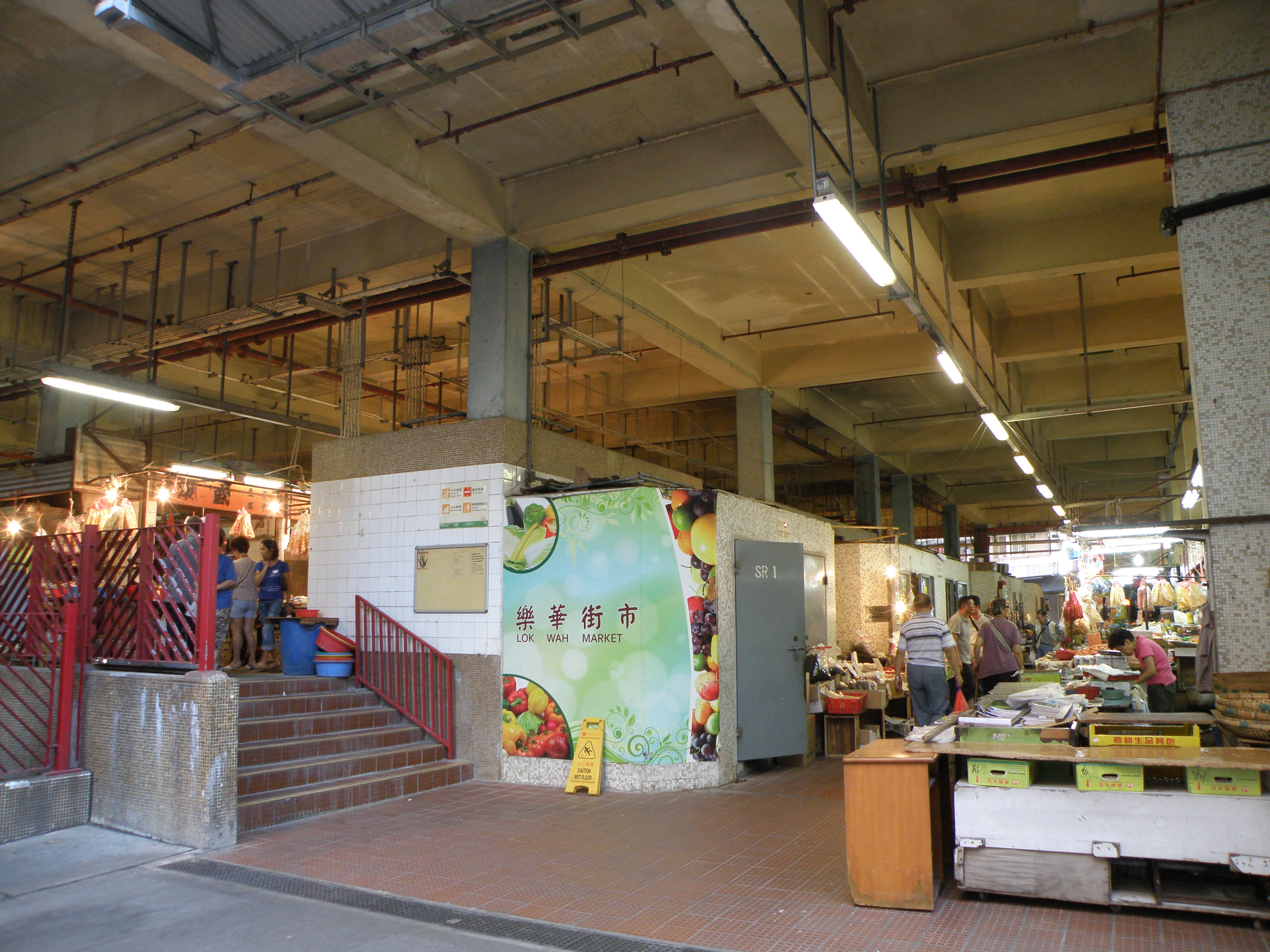
Lok Wah Market

The estate also has a covered open-air market, the Lok Wah Market, with a wide range of goods including fresh produce and meats, flowers, groceries, and dry goods.

In terms of dining, there is an area of outdoor cooked food stalls (similar to dai pai dong) with seating underneath large mushroom-shaped concrete canopies. These are popular with residents late into the night. The commercial centre has a range of fast food options including McDonald's and Café de Coral as well as a large Chinese restaurant.

=== Parks and open spaces ===
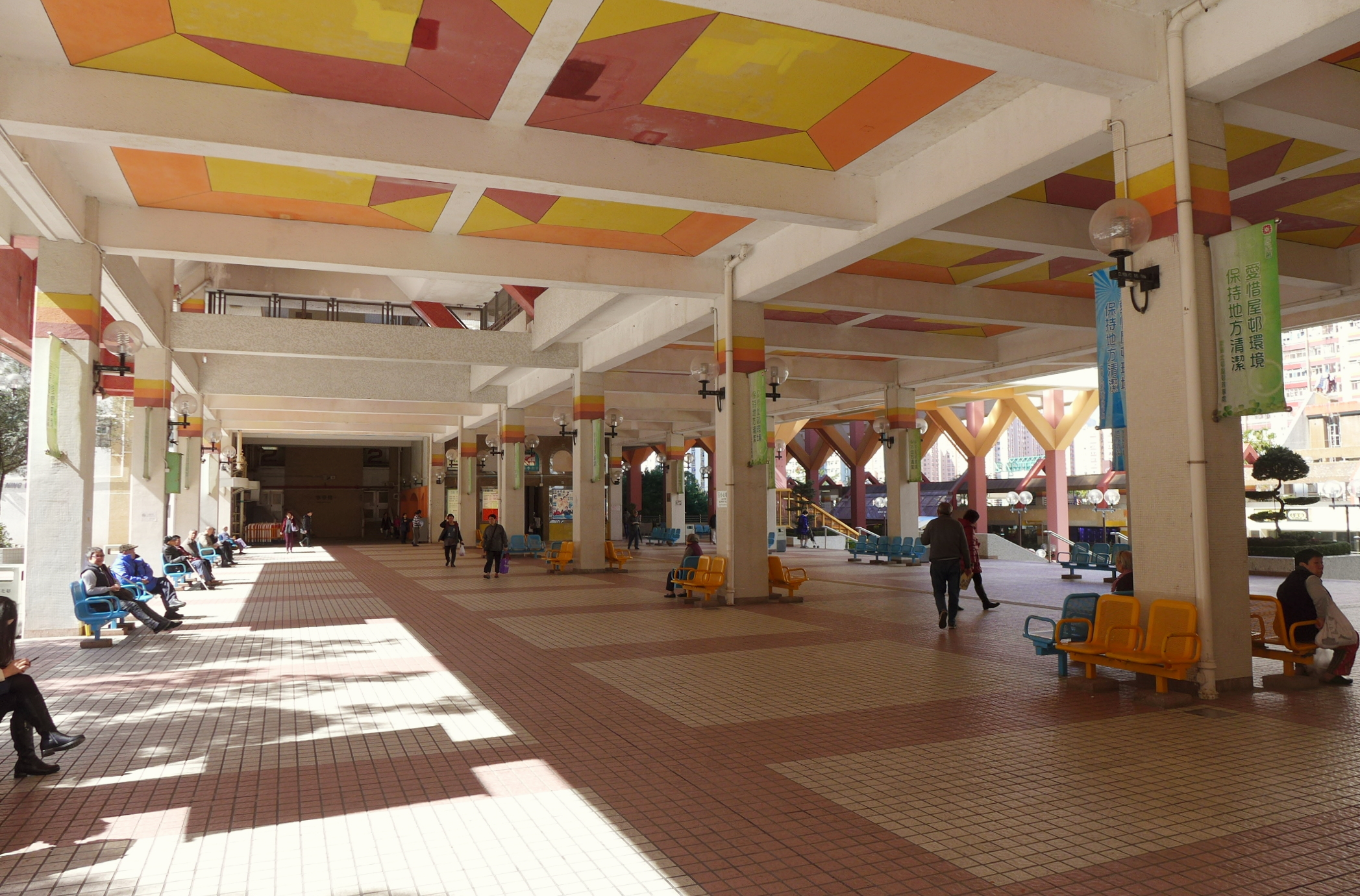
The covered open space near the commercial centre

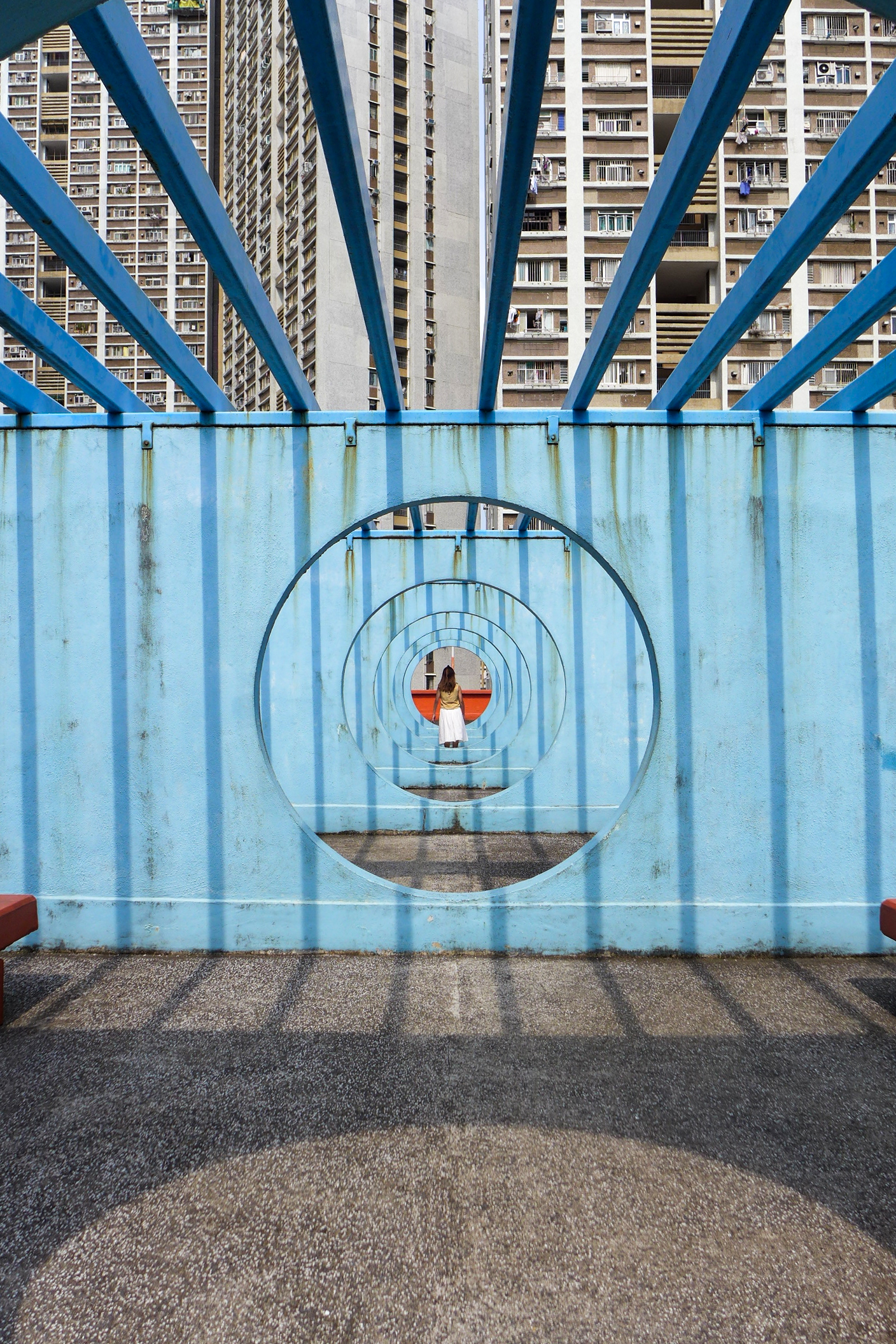
Carpark Roof become iconic spot for people to take photography

There are several parks near the estate. The Lok Wah Playground, opened in 1977, is the largest. It is spread over three platforms linked by staircases. It was originally called the Fook Wah Tsuen Playground, after the former name of the area, until the 2000s. Due to wear-and-tear, the park was renovated at a cost of $45 million over 2002–2003. It is now home to two five-a-side hard-surfaced football pitches, two children's playgrounds, two basketball-cum-volleyball courts, gardens, and sitting-out areas.

The Kung Lok Road Playground is a hard-surfaced open space intended for use by bicyclists, but also popular with joggers. It opened in 1988. There is a bicycle rental kiosk, sitting-out areas, and a park office with public toilets. The park is directly linked to Lok Wah Playground and from both parks one can quickly reach Ngau Tau Kok Road via a staircase that links to On Shin Road.

Lok Wah Estate also incorporates two urban squares that are popular gathering places for residents. One is directly in front of the Lok Wah Shopping Centre and has multiple levels and a large area protected from the elements. The other is surrounded by the blocks of Lok Wah South Estate. There are also sitting out areas on the market rooftop, on the shopping centre rooftop, and another surrounded by the blocks of Lok Nga Court.

Other large parks within close walking distance of the estate include Hong Ning Road Park, the Jordan Valley Playground, Hong Ning Road Recreation Ground, and the Kwun Tong High Level Service Reservoir Playground.

=== Other public facilities ===
The Chun Wah Road Sport Centre is an indoors games hall, opened in 1984, operated by the Leisure and Cultural Services Department. It is located on top of the Lok Nga Court car park at No. 50 Chun Wah Road. The facility houses a main arena that can be used for basketball, volleyball, or badminton. It also houses a dance room, a table tennis room, and an activity room. The sports centre was part of a Housing Authority $27 million investment to add more sporting facilities in estates, and was considered a pilot Estate Recreation Centre. It was planned and operated by the Urban Council, and was planned to be smaller than other sports centres in light of its proximity to the Ngau Tau Kok Complex.

The community once had its own post office at Shop 109 in the commercial centre, opened 1989. However, it closed permanently on 11 April 2015. Hongkong Post cited the need to "rationalise" its retail network as the reason for the closure. The estate is now served by a mobile post office that stops in front of Yan Wah House on selected weekday mornings.

Police services are provided by the Sau Mau Ping Police Station at No. 200 Hong Ning Road, a five minutes' walk from the estate, where there is a public reporting room. The nearest hospital is the United Christian Hospital, a 10-minute walk away.

The YWCA Lok Wah Community Centre is located at 80 Chun Wah Road.

== Houses ==
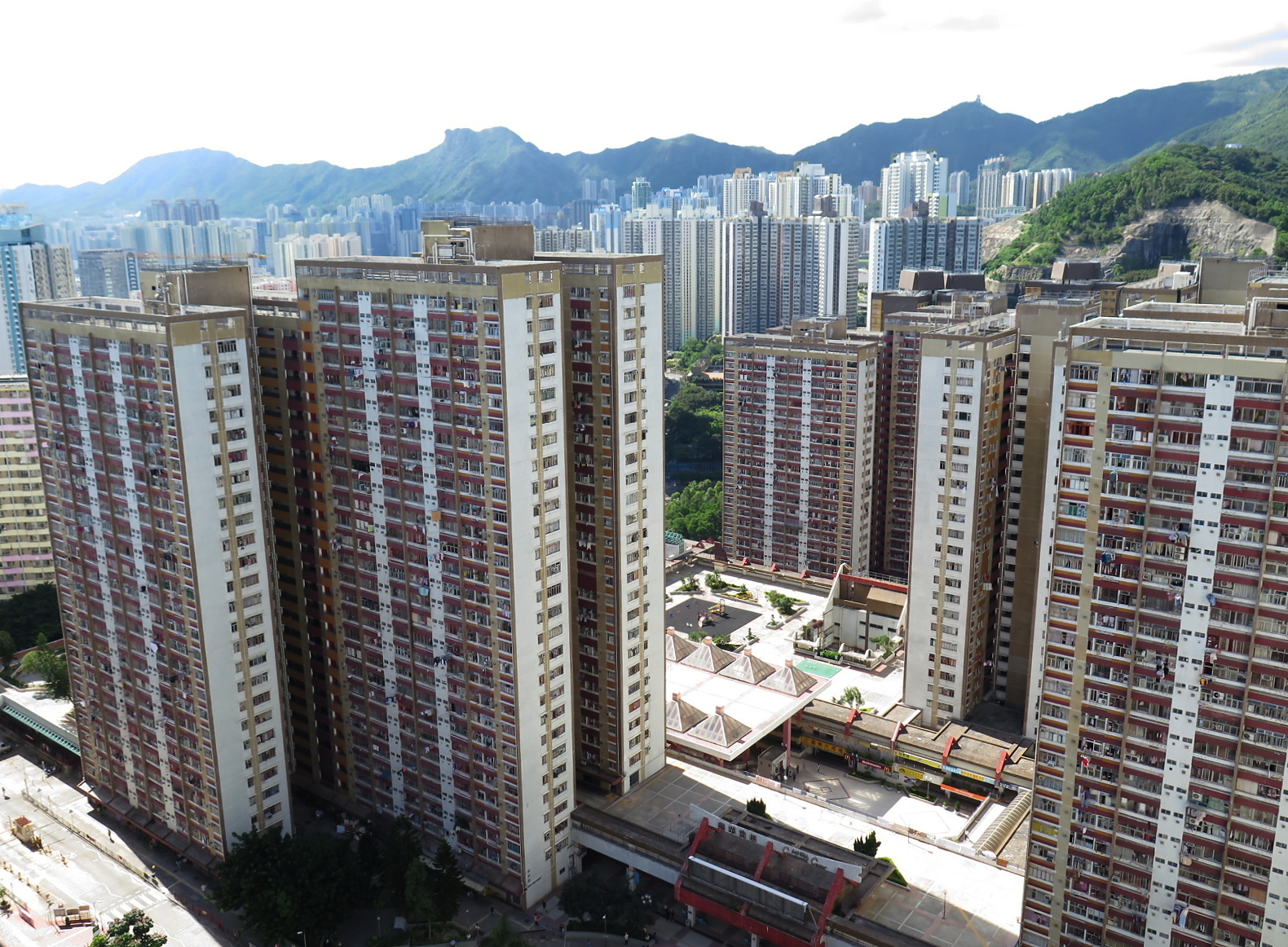
Lok Wah (North) Estate

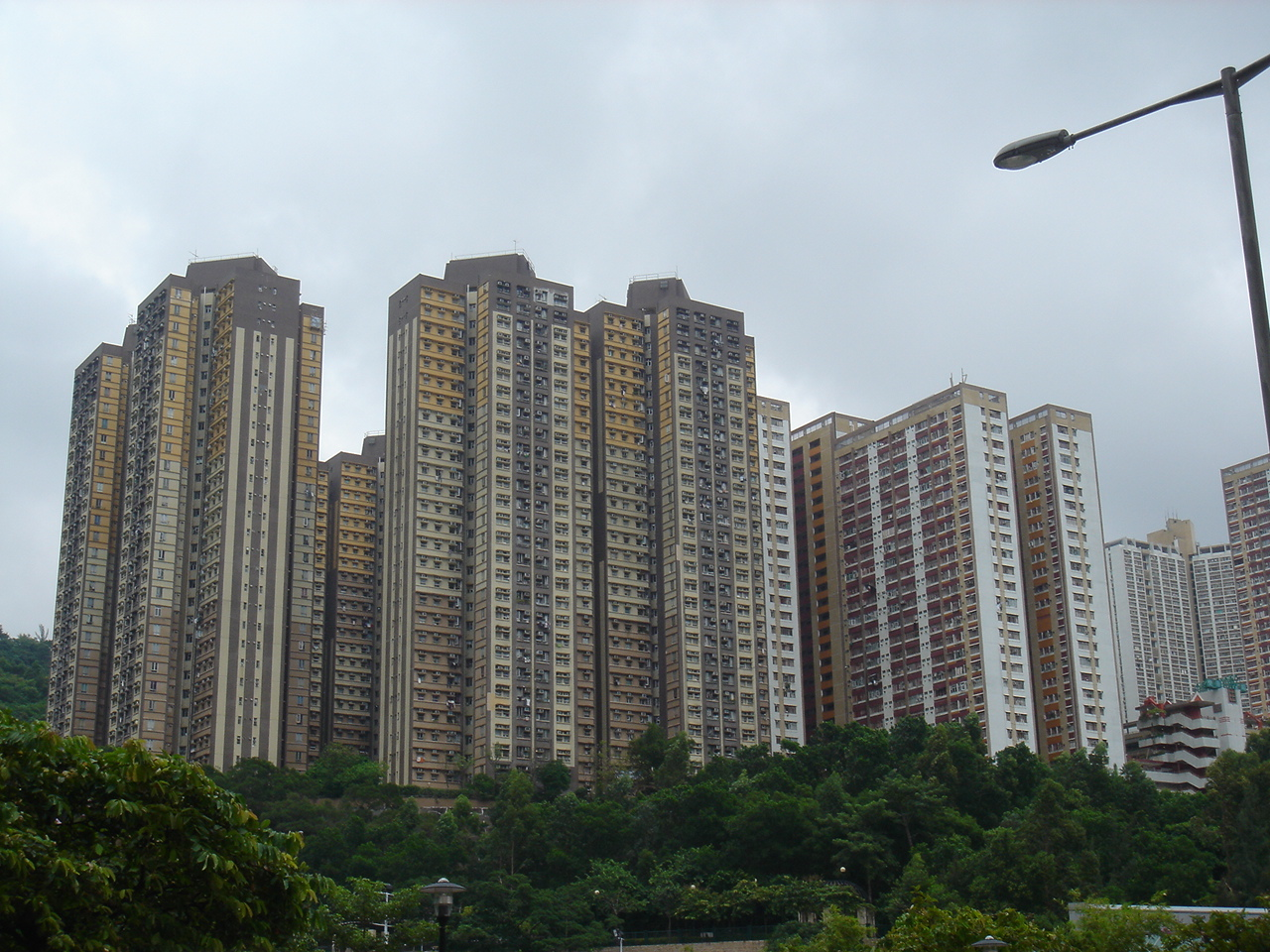
Lok Nga Court (left) and Lok Wah Estate (right)

=== Lok Wah Estate ===
Name	Chinese name	Area	Type	Completion
Chin Wah House	展華樓	South estate	Old Slab	1982
Fai Wah House	輝華樓	South estate	Old Slab	1982
Hei Wah House	喜華樓	South estate	Trident 1	1985
Man Wah House	敏華樓	South estate	Trident 1	1985
On Wah House	安華樓	South estate	Trident 1	1985
Wun Wah House	奐華樓	South estate	Trident 1	1985
Ning Wah House	寧華樓	North estate	Double H	1985
Lap Wah House	立華樓	North estate	Double H	1985
Po Wah House	普華樓	North estate	Double H	1985
Ping Wah House	秉華樓	North estate	Double H	1985
Shun Wah House	信華樓	North estate	Double H	1985
Tat Wah House	達華樓	North estate	Double H	1985
Kan Wah House	勤華樓	North estate	Double H	1985
Yan Wah House	欣華樓	North estate	Double H	1985

=== Lok Nga Court ===
Name	Chinese name	Type	Completion
Nga Yat House	雅逸閣	Flexi 2	1984
Nga Ching House	雅靜閣	Flexi 2	1984
Nga Tsui House	雅趣閣	Flexi 2	1984
Nga Yee House	雅意閣	Flexi 2	1984
Nga Wo House	雅和閣	Flexi 2	1984
Nga Ping House	雅平閣	Flexi 2	1984

== Administration ==
District Councilors:

- Lok Wah North: Mr. Chi-Ken Wong
- Lok Wah South: Mr. Kevin Koon-Chung So
- Jordan Valley: Mr. Ngan Man-Yu (Lok Nga Court falls within this constituency)

Tenancy Management:

- Kwun Tong District Division 2 (Lok Wah)

== Education ==
The following schools are in or near Lok Wah Estate:

- Fukien Secondary School
- Ko Lui Secondary School
- Kwun Tong Kung Lok Government Secondary School
- Lok Sin Tong Yeung Chung Ming Primary School
- Lok Wah Catholic Primary School
- Mu Kuang English School
- SKH Kei Lok Primary School
- St Catharine's School for Girls, Kwun Tong

Lok Wah Estate is in Primary One Admission (POA) School Net 48. Within the school net are multiple aided schools (operated independently but funded with government money) and Kwun Tong Government Primary School.

== See also ==
- Public housing estates in Ngau Tau Kok and Kowloon Bay
