= Mu Kuang English School =

Secondary school in Kwun Tong, Hong Kong

Coordinates: 22.3184°N 114.2187°E

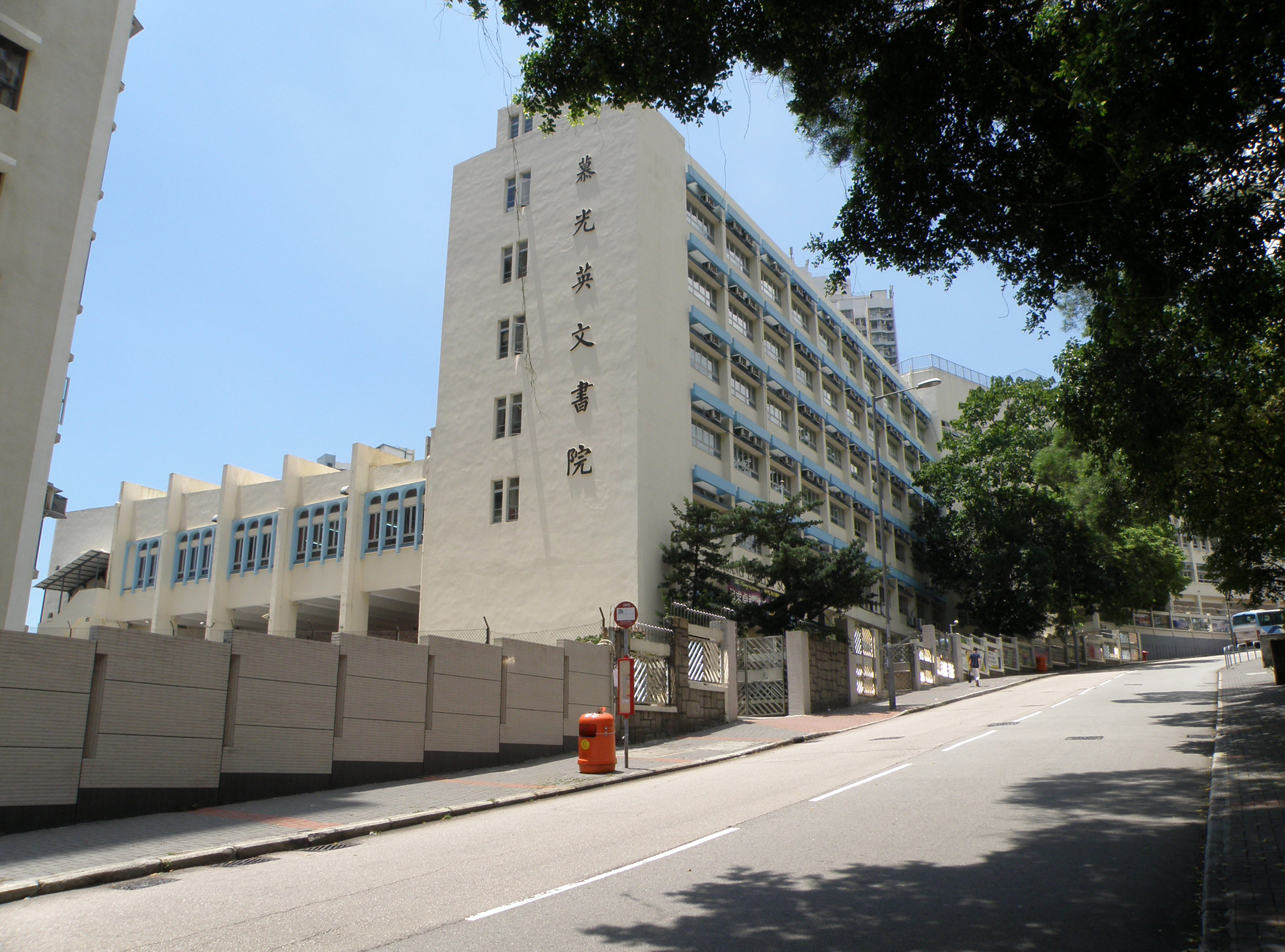
- 55 Kung Lok Road, Kwun Tong

Information
- Type: Direct Subsidy Scheme
- Motto: Pursuit of knowledge, truth, love, and light.
- Opened: 1954
- Founder: Elsie Elliott
- School district: Kwun Tong
- Principal: Mr. Cheung Wing Fung
- Faculty: 72
- Forms: 1 to 6
- Campus type: Urban
- Website: www.mukuang.edu.hk

Mu Kuang English School
- Traditional Chinese: 慕光英文書院
- Simplified Chinese: 慕光英文书院
Transcriptions
Standard Mandarin
- Hanyu Pinyin: Mù Guāng Yīngwén Shūyuàn
Yue: Cantonese
- Jyutping: mou6 gwong1 jing1 man4 syu1 jyun6

The Mu Kuang English School (Chinese: 慕光英文書院; Jyutping: mou6 gwong1 jing1 man4 syu1 jyun6) is a secondary school on Kung Lok Road, Kwun Tong, Kowloon, Hong Kong. It is a non-government school funded under the Direct Subsidy Scheme.

== History ==
The school was founded by Elsie Elliott in Kai Tak New Village in 1954 with an enrolment of 30 squatter and refugee children. Classes were held under makeshift canopies, and Elliott supported the school financially by teaching in other schools. Andrew Tu Hsueh-kwei, whom Elliott married in 1985, became headmaster of the school. The school accommodation was doubled in size in 1958 thanks to a donation from Mr. N.V.A. Croucher.

"Mu Kuang" (Chinese: 慕光; Jyutping: mou6 gwong1) means "yearning for light" in Chinese. The school was so named in reference to a "thirsting for the light of learning and truth". Elliott later quipped that the name came to refer to a literal thirst for daylight, since it was so dark inside the former British Army tent in which classes were initially held.

Owing to the "extreme poverty and suffering" in the area, the school staff tried to undertake relief work near the school. A simple clinic was set up at the school for emergency treatment. A formal social welfare clinic, offering medical services and distribution of relief food, was set up at the school with the assistance of members of the Guild of Saint Helena in 1959.

About five years after its founding, the school moved to occupy two storeys of a building on Nga Tsin Wai Road. It later expanded with two branches, on Lion Rock Road and Prince Edward Road respectively. The school took out an interest-free government loan of $2 million and raised an additional $600,000 to build a permanent school building.

On 28 November 1972, the new 60,000 square feet (5,600 m^{2}) school building was opened on Kung Lok Road, Kwun Tong by the Director of Education, J. Canning. It was built to accommodate 1,400 pupils. The building was designed by architect P.K. Chan and built by the Hoover Construction Company. A new building wing was added in 1986 directly to the north of the older one.

== Description ==
Mu Kuang English School is a co-ed institution with media of instruction of English and Chinese (Cantonese). As of 2015, the school had a staff of 72 teachers. 'Mu Kuang was the first school in Hong Kong to introduce Korean as part of its regular curriculum in September 2021', according to an article by The Japan News.

== Notable alumni ==
- Osman Hung – actor and singer-songwriter
- Miriam Yeung – actress and singer
- Sirilak Kwong - Thai-HK actress

== See also ==
- Garden Estate
- Lok Wah Estate
- Upper Ngau Tau Kok Estate
