= Man Kwan QualiEd College =

Secondary school in Hong Kong

- 萬鈞匯知中學
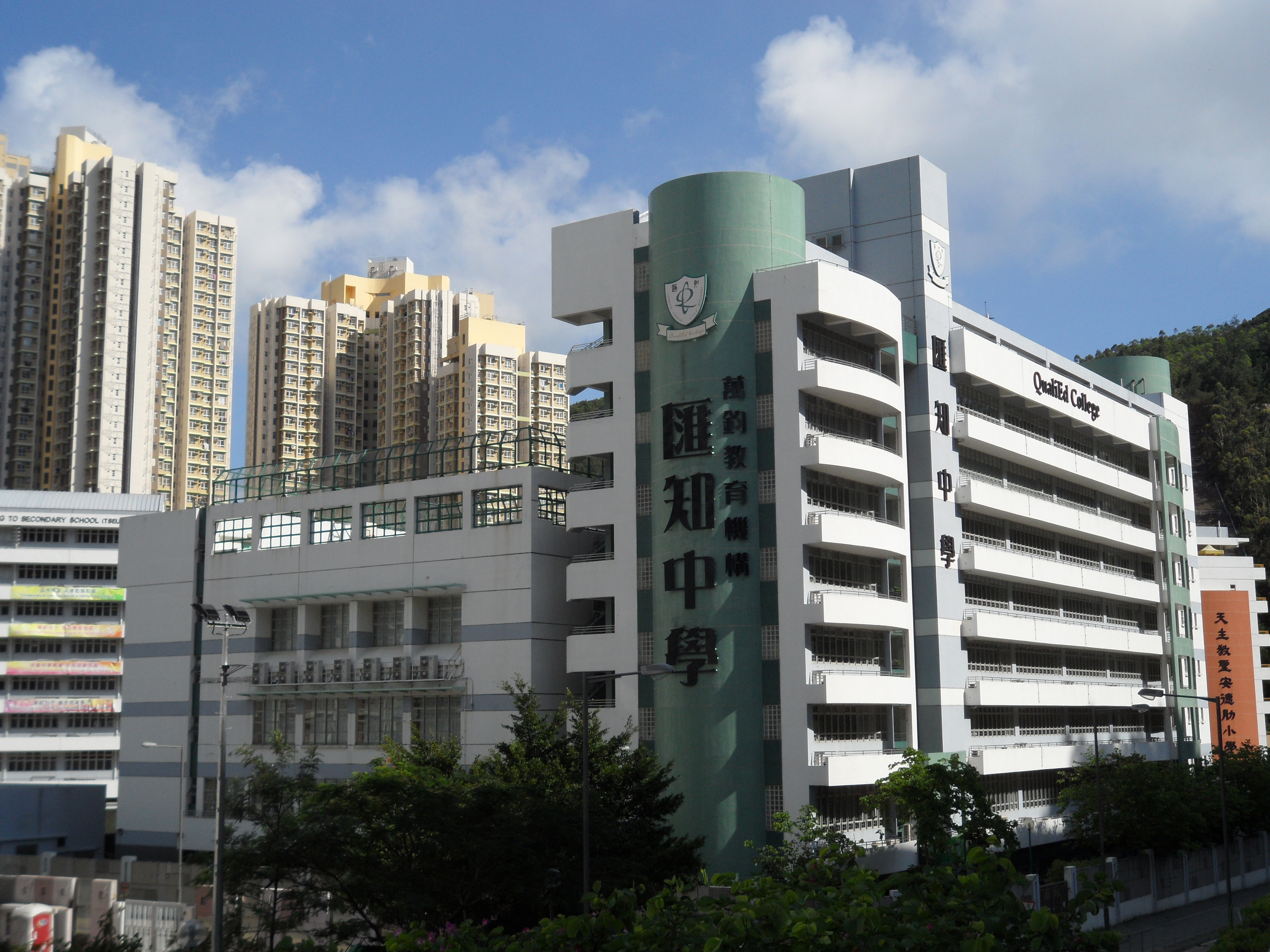
- QualiEd College in 2011

Location
- 2, Kan Hok Lane; Tiu Keng Leng, Tseung Kwan O Hong Kong; 22°18′18.56″N 114°14′56.91″E

Information
- School type: Direct Subsidy Scheme, Secondary school
- Motto: Truth Goodness Beauty
- Established: c. 2003; 23 years ago
- School district: Sai Kung
- Authority: Man Kwan Educational Organisation
- Supervisor: Tam Man-kwan
- Principal: Wong Kin-san
- Teaching staff: 66
- Grades: Secondary 1–6
- Gender: Co-educational
- Enrollment: about 900
- Area: 8,000 m^{2} (86,000 ft^{2})
- Publication: Chinese: 《匯知家書》 《向日葵》 《向日葵》 《匯萃》 微型小說師生文集 校刊
- Website: www.mkqc.edu.hk

Man Kwan QualiEd College (Chinese: 萬鈞匯知中學, abbreviated to MKQC) is a secondary school in Tiu Keng Leng, Hong Kong. It was established in 2003 by QualiEd Educational Organisation and has been managed by Man Kwan Educational Organisation since 1 December 2009. The school is part of the Direct Subsidy Scheme (DSS) and offers non-academic subjects like financial management and "creative industries" to students. QualiEd is short for 'Quality Education'.

== History ==
Man Kwan QualiEd College was founded in 2003 by Tam Man-kwan (Chinese: 譚萬鈞). Chan Hung (Chinese: 陳葒) was the school's founding principal. The school is next to the Tiu Keng Leng station.

== QualiEd Professional and Continuing Education College ==
QualiEd Professional and Continuing Education College (Chinese: 匯知專業持續教育書院, abbreviated to QPCEC) is a subsidiary college of Man Kwan QualiEd College. It was established in 2000 by QualiEd Educational Organization, and occupies the same teaching building as MKQC. QPCEC provides higher education courses, including Diploma Programme, Higher Diploma Programme, Pre-AD, and Top-up Degree Programme.
