= Missionary Sisters of the Immaculate Conception =

Roman Catholic religious congregation for women

- Established: 1902; 124 years ago
- Founders: Mother Délia Tetreault, MIC
- Founded at: Montreal Canada
- Type: Centralized Religious Institute of Consecrated Life of Pontifical Right (for Women)
- Headquarters: Generalate
- Region served: Asia, Africa, North America and South America
- Members: 669
- Postnominal initials: M.I.C.
- Affiliations: Roman Catholic
- Website: soeurs-mic.qc.ca

The Missionary Sisters of the Immaculate Conception are members of a religious congregation of women dedicated to serve in the nations of the world most in need. Founded in 1902 by Délia Tétreault (1865–1941) in Canada, they were the first such institute established in North America. Members of the congregation use the postnominal initials of M.I.C.

== History ==
Tétreault was born on a farm in rural Quebec. Having lost her mother in infancy, her father entrusted her care to her maternal aunt and her husband before emigrating to the United States for work. She was raised in a very religious household and grew up reading stories of the missions run by the Catholic Church in Africa and Asia. As a young woman she felt called to take part in this effort, and attempted to join a religious institute twice. Both times, however, her lifelong poor health prevented her from achieving this goal.

Tétreault spent twenty years serving the needs of the residents of a poor neighborhood in Montreal, Quebec. During this time, she remained convinced that she was being called to establish a way to contribute to the overseas missions, in the same way that the people of Canada had been served by the Paris Foreign Missions Society in the early centuries of its development. She came to know a Catholic priest, Gustave Bourassa, who supported her vision and guided her through the process of presenting her proposal to the Archdiocese of Montreal.

In 1902, Paul Bruchési, the Archbishop of Montreal, gave permission for the founding of the congregation. Tétreault drew together a small group of women who had expressed interest in this project and opened an apostolic school to train them for serving overseas. The following year, they found a permanent home at 27, Saint Catherine Road, Outremont. In 1904, Bruchési had to travel to Rome on Church business, during which time he spoke to Pope Pius X about this new foundation. The pope immediately answered, "Found, found, and all the blessings of Heaven will fall upon this new Institute and you will call them the Missionary Sisters of the Immaculate Conception."

Tétreault and her companions were allowed to profess religious vows in 1905, at which time she took the religious name of Mother Mary of the Holy Spirit (French: Mère Marie-du-Saint-Ésprit). In 1909, the first group of six members of the congregation left Canada to serve in Canton, China. In October 1913, the Shek Lung Leprosarium, on Saint Marie Island, was entrusted to the missionaries. Communities were soon established in Japan and the Philippines. Within the next ten years, 26 Sisters were serving in Asia. The foundress also established houses of the congregation throughout Quebec, to provide assistance to the Sisters serving in the overseas missions. In 1933, Tétreault began to suffer from an increasing paralysis, which restricted her contact with the other Sisters to written communications. The first General Chapter of the congregation was held on 25 January 1939, and Mother Marie-de-la-Providence (Anna Paquette) was elected Superior General to succeed her.

By the time she had taken ill and had started to withdraw from the administration of the congregation, the foundress had opened 36 houses of Missionary Sisters: 19 in Asia, 16 in Canada and one in Rome.

== Expansion ==
After World War II, during which period Tétreault had died, the congregation established new communities in Bolivia, Chile, Cuba, Equatorial Guinea, Haiti, Madagascar, Malawi, Peru, Philippines, Taiwan, Vietnam and Zambia, where they now serve.

The Sisters were expelled from China in 1953, with the sole exception of a Chinese member, Sister Lucia Ho, M.I.C.

== Ebola crisis ==
During the outbreak of the Ebola virus in West Africa, a small group of the Sisters were serving with the Brothers Hospitallers of St. John of God at St. Joseph Hospital in Monrovia, Liberia. Many of the staff members became infected. One of the Hospitaller Brothers, Miguel Parajes, O.H., a native of Spain, was airlifted back to his homeland by his government. Spain also transported Sister Juliana Bonoha Bohé, M.I.C., who was a native of Equatorial Guinea, a former Spanish colony. She tested negative for the disease, however, when she arrived in Madrid. That government, however, refused to transport the other member of the community.
