= Law Ting Pong Secondary School =

Secondary school in Tai Po, Hong Kong

Coordinates: 22.4432°N 114.1652°E

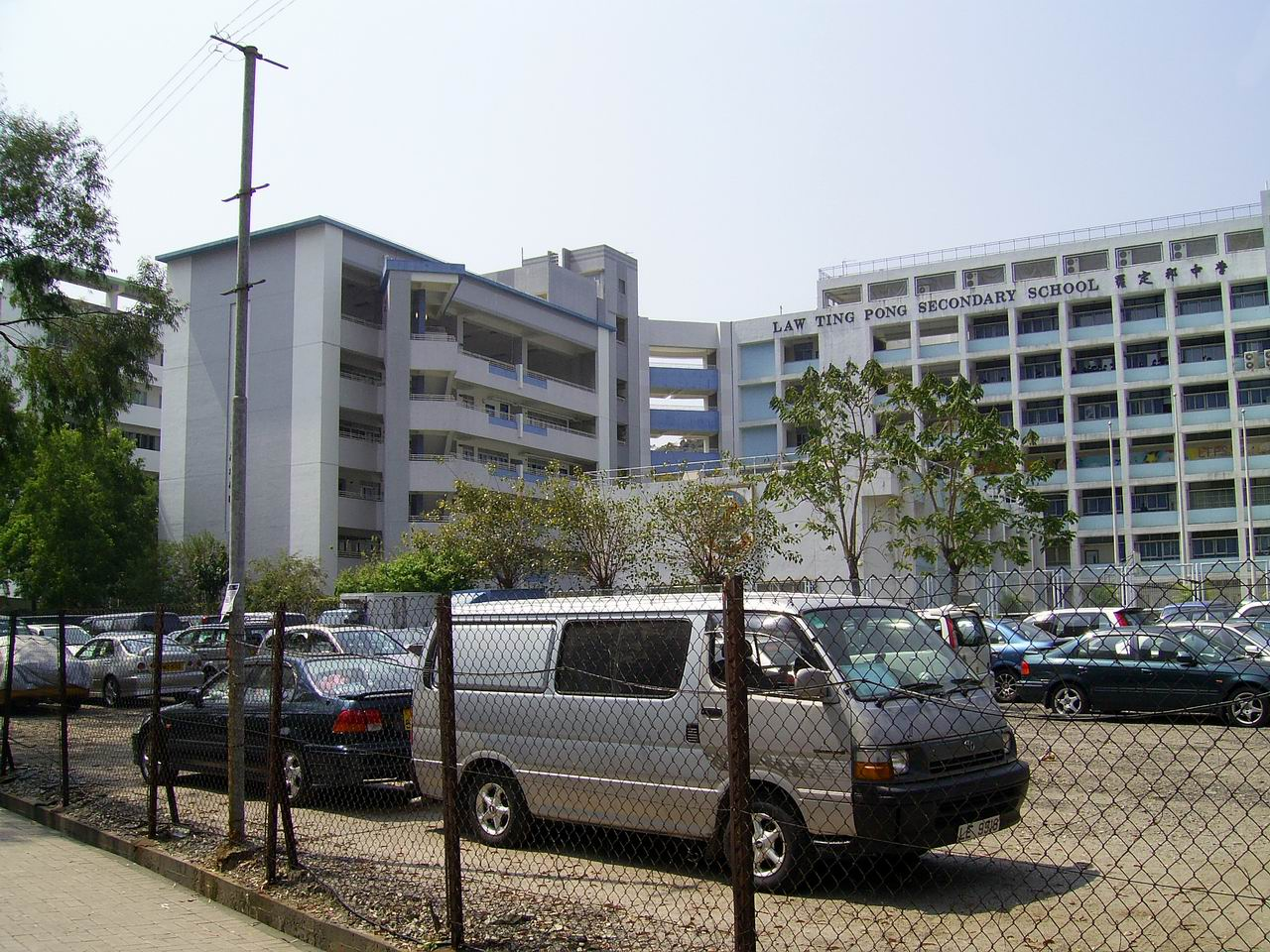
- Traditional Chinese: 羅定邦公立中學
- Simplified Chinese: 罗定邦中学
Transcriptions
Standard Mandarin
- Hanyu Pinyin: Luó Dìngbāng Zhōngxué
Yue: Cantonese
- Jyutping: lo4 ding6 bong1 zung1 hok6

Law Ting Pong Secondary School (LTPSS) (Chinese: 羅定邦中學) is a co-educational EMI school located in Tai Po, Hong Kong.

The school was founded in 1991 by Law's Foundation Limited and it actively promotes its aims and educational philosophy. The school successfully gained support and recognition from parents, as reflected by the number of elite students enrolled in the school. In order to further pursue the school's educational ideals, LTPSS was operated under the Direct Subsidy Scheme (DSS) from the academic year 2008/09 onwards.
