= Delia Group of Schools =

Hong Kong educational organisation

The Delia Group of Schools
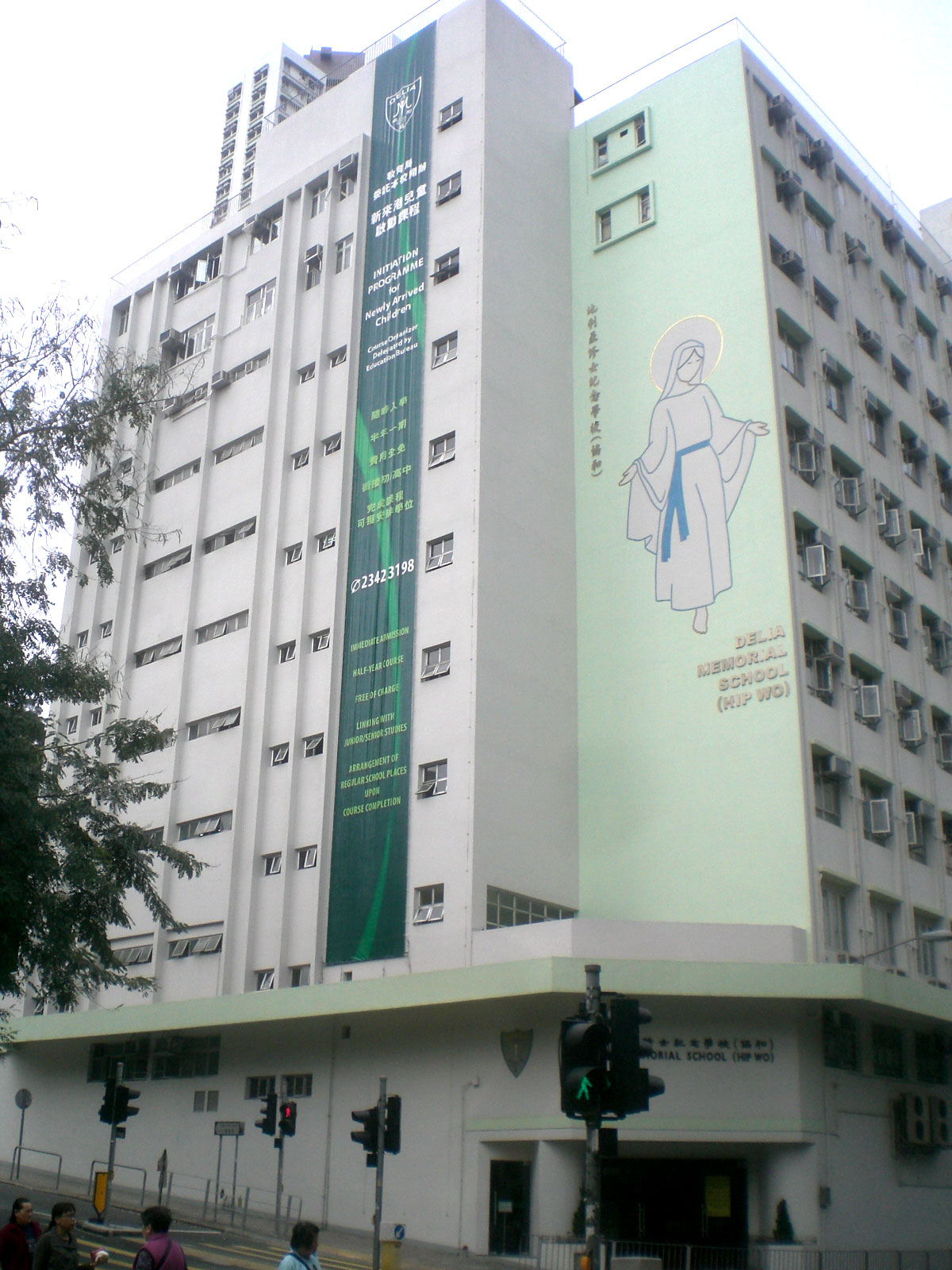
- Delia Memorial School (Hip Wo)
- Named after: Délia Tétreault
- Formation: 1965
- Founder: J. W. Edmonds and his wife

The Delia Group of Schools is an educational organisation in Hong Kong founded in 1965 by J. W. Edmonds and his wife. The first location was Delia Memorial School on Ashley Road, in Tsim Sha Tsui.

The couple chose Délia Tétreault, a Canadian religious sister, as the school's namesake, to honour her and the work that her congregation, the Missionary Sisters of the Immaculate Conception, did in China.

The Delia Group of Schools consists of three different sections: Delia Memorial School, Delia English Primary School and Kindergarten, and Delia School of Canada.

== Delia Memorial Schools ==
There are several Delia Memorial Schools across Hong Kong, with the education provided being based on the local Hong Kong secondary curriculum. The school's motto is "Harmony in Diversity", and it brings students of different nationalities under the local education system.

- Delia Memorial School (Broadway)
- Delia Memorial School (Glee Path)
- Delia Memorial School (Hip Wo)
- Delia Memorial School (Hip Wo No. 2 College)
- Delia Memorial School (Yuet Wah), founded in 1975

== Other schools ==
- Delia (Man Kiu) English Primary School (Chinese: 地利亞(閩僑)英文小學), formerly known as Man Kiu Association No. 2 Primary School (閩僑第二小學), is located in phase III of Cheung On Estate on Tsing Yi island.
- Delia English Primary School and Kindergarten is in Mei Foo, on Broadway road.
- Delia School of Canada (Chinese: 地利亞加拿大學校) in Tai Koo Shing, Hong Kong Island

== Bibliography ==
- Erni, John Nguyet; Leung, Lisa Yuk-ming (2014). "Education of South Asian Youth: The Case of Delia Memorial School". Understanding South Asian Minorities in Hong Kong. Hong Kong: Hong Kong University Press. pp. 118–150. doi:10.5790/hongkong/9789888208340.003.0005. ISBN 978-988-8208-34-0. JSTOR j.ctt14jxs35.9.
