= Direct Subsidy Scheme =

Schooling system in Hong Kong

- Traditional Chinese: 直接資助計劃
- Simplified Chinese: 直接资助计划
Transcriptions
Standard Mandarin
- Hanyu Pinyin: Zhíjiē Zīzhù Jìhuà
Yue: Cantonese
- Jyutping: zik6 zip3 zi1 zo6 gai3 waak6

DSS
- Traditional Chinese: 直資
- Simplified Chinese: 直资
Transcriptions
Standard Mandarin
- Hanyu Pinyin: Zhízī
Yue: Cantonese
- Jyutping: zik6 z1

The Direct Subsidy Scheme (DSS) is instituted by the Education Bureau of Hong Kong to enhance the quality of private schools at the primary and secondary levels. The Hong Kong government has been encouraging non-government secondary schools which have attained a sufficiently high educational standard to join the DSS by providing subsidies to enhance the quality of private school education since the 1991–92 school year. In the 2000–01 school year, the DSS was extended to primary schools. In the 2001–02 school year, the terms of the DSS were significantly improved to attract more schools to join the scheme. Under the scheme, schools are free to decide on their curriculum, fees, and entrance requirements.

== Standard ==
Non-government schools must satisfy stipulated standards to be eligible to join the scheme. The standards include requirements regarding the mode of operation (unisessional), class size, teacher's qualifications and facilities. For example, schools need a permanent school premises, more than 70 per cent of teachers had to be degree-holders, and they had to have sufficient facilities such as computer, music and language labs.

== Curricula ==
DSS schools are free to design their own curriculum. They are not subject to the guidelines issued by the Education Department. Although DSS schools are required to offer principally a curriculum targeting local students and prepare its students to sit for local examinations, certain DSS schools are currently offering or are set to offer International Baccalaureate programmes.

== Admission ==
DSS schools are generally free to select their own students, subject to special arrangements with the government in case of shortage of places in government/aided schools. However, DSS schools are not allowed to select their students by conducting written entrance tests.

== Financing ==
DSS schools are free to charge school fees. In the 2009–10 school year, their schools fees range from $3,000 to $110,000 per year.

A DSS school will receive full recurrent subsidy until its fee level reaches 2 1/3 times the average unit cost of an aided school place. Beyond this level, no recurrent subsidy is available. The average unit cost of an aided school place is calculated based on a two-age based system to address the needs of schools with longer development background. In short, a higher level of subsidy would be available to DSS schools that have been operating for 16 years or above. The level of recurrent subsidy received by a DSS school is hence dependent on the number of students enrolled in that particular school.

Also, to help ex-aided DSS schools adapt to new financing methods, ex-aided DSS schools that receive less recurrent subsidy after joining the DSS will continue to receive recurrent subsidy as if they were aided schools for 5 years.

To cater for students from less well-off families, DSS schools are required to set aside at least 10% of their income for fee / scholarship schemes. In addition, for every dollar charged over two-thirds of the average unit cost of an aided school place, the school should set aside 50 cents for scholarship and financial assistance schemes.

== Administration ==
DSS schools are required by the government to issue annual prospectuses, which must contain stipulated classes of information such as vision, mission and objectives of the school; class structure; curriculum; achievements in public exams; extra curricula activities; and school fees. DSS schools are free to spend their grants for educational purposes, subject to inspection of their audited accounts. Ex-aided DSS schools will be given an option to revert to aided status only if the government changes the formula for calculating DSS subsidy such that the school financial viability is adversely affected.

== Controversy ==
Pegasus Philip Wong Kin Hang Christian Primary School, a DSS school, sparked controversy in 2009 when the sponsoring body pulled out, and irregularities in its accounts were revealed. The school management committee agreed to pay an advance payment of two to three weeks to Pegasus Social Service Christian Organization, the sponsoring body, which is also the school's service provider and chaired by school supervisor Carmen Leung Suk-ching. The government's monitoring mechanism over DSS schools has therefore been criticised by legislators.

Some DSS schools have also come under criticism for raising school fees despite the economic downturn.

The scheme has also been criticised as benefiting the private education sector and the well-off students at the expense of the public sector.

== List ==
Here is a list of Direct Subsidy Scheme Schools as of the 2026/2027 School Year. Schools with a unified secondary and primary section both inside the Direct Subsidy Scheme are denoted with @. Primary Schools are denoted in italics.

=== Central and Western District (2) ===
- St Paul's Co-educational College
- St Paul's College

=== Eastern District (6) ===
- HKUGA Primary School
- Hon Wah College@
- Kiangsu-Chekiang College, International Section
- Pui Kiu Middle School
- The Chinese Foundation Secondary School

=== Islands District (2) ===
- Buddhist Fat Ho Memorial College
- YMCA of Hong Kong Christian College

=== Kowloon City District (7) ===
- Diocesan Boys' School@
- Heep Yunn School
- HKICC Lee Shau Kee School of Creativity
- Po Leung Kuk Lam Man Chan English Primary School
- Po Leung Kuk Ngan Po Ling College
- Scientia Secondary School

=== Kwai Tsing District (1) ===
- Delia (Man Kiu) English Primary School

=== Kwun Tong District (7) ===
- Delia Memorial School (Hip Wo)
- Delia Memorial School (Hip Wo No.2 College)
- ECF Saint Too Canaan College
- Fukien Secondary School
- Fukien Secondary School Affliated School
- Mu Kuang English School
- United Christian College (Kowloon East)

=== North District (1) ===
- Fanling Lutheran Secondary School

=== Sai Kung District (11) ===
- Creative Secondary School
- Evangel College@
- G.T. (Ellen Yeung) College@
- Heung To Secondary School (Tseung Kwan O)
- HKCCC Union Logos Academy@
- Man Kwan QualiEd College
- Po Leung Kuk Laws Foundation College
- Po Leung Kuk Luk Hing Too Primary School

=== Sha Tin District (8) ===
- HKBUAS Wong Kam Fai Secondary and Primary School@
- Lam Tai Fai College
- Li Po Chun United World College of Hong Kong
- Pui Kiu College@
- Stewards Pooi Kei College
- Tak Sun Secondary School

=== Sham Shui Po District (11) ===
- China Holiness College
- Delia Memorial School (Broadway)
- Delia Memorial School (Glee Path)
- Heung To Middle School
- Lingnan University Alumni Association (HK) Primary School
- St Margaret's Co-educational English Secondary and Primary School@
- Tsung Tsin Christian Academy
- Wai Kiu College
- Ying Wa College
- Ying Wa Primary School

=== Southern District (4) ===
- HKUGA College
- St Paul's Co-educational College Primary School
- St Paul's College Primary School
- St Stephen's College]

=== Tai Po District (2) ===
- Law Ting Pong Secondary School
- Tai Po Sam Yuk Secondary School

=== Tuen Mun District (1) ===
- Po Leung Kuk Hong Kong Taoist Association Yuen Yuen Primary School

=== Wan Chai District (3) ===
- Academy of Innovation (Confucius Hall)
- CCC Kung Lee College
- St Paul's Convent School

=== Wong Tai Sin District (1) ===
- Good Hope School

=== Yau Tsim Mong District (4) ===
- Diocesan Girls' School
- HKMA David Li Kwok Po College
- Kowloon Sam Yuk Secondary School
- Po Leung Kuk Camoes Tan Siu Lin Primary School

=== Yuen Long District (7) ===
- Chinese YMCA Secondary School
- ELCHK Lutheran Academy@
- Heung To Middle School (Tin Shui Wai)
- HKFYG Lee Shau Kee College
- Man Kwan Pak Kau College
- W F Joseph Lee Primary School

== See also ==
- Education in Hong Kong
- Dion Chen
