= Délia Tétreault =

Canadian religious sister and congregation founder (1865–1941)

Venerable Délia Tétreault MIC
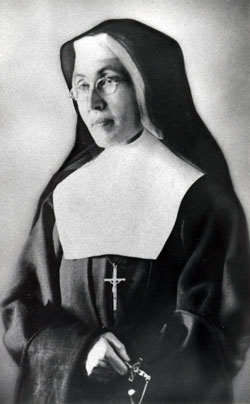
- Tétreault c. 1905
- Born: 4 February 1865; Marieville, Quebec
- Died: 1 October 1941

Délia Tétreault, religious name Marie of the Holy Spirit (French: Marie-du-Saint-Esprit) (4 February 1865 – 1 October 1941), was a Canadian religious sister. Though she never left her homeland, she felt called to serve the needy of the world, for which purpose she founded the Missionary Sisters of the Immaculate Conception in 1902, the first missionary congregation of Canadian origin. The cause for Tétreault's beatification was opened in 1982.

== Early life ==
Délia Tétreault was born in Marieville, Quebec, on 4 February 1865. She and her twin brother, Roch, were among nine children of Alexis Tétreault, a farmer, and his wife, Céline Ponton. Délia was often sick, and Roch died at the age of seven months. Their mother died two years later. Alexis Tétreault subsequently decided to emigrate to the United States, and Délia was taken in by her aunt, Julie Ponton, and her husband, Jean Alix.

Tétreault was raised in a very religious household. When she was a child, she would hide in the attic and read periodicals published by the Propagation of the Faith and the Holy Childhood Association, both founded to promote the missionary activity of the Catholic Church in Asia and Africa. For her education, Tétreault's aunt enrolled her in the village school, run by the Sisters of the Presentation of Mary.

One night, the young Tétreault had a significant dream. She was kneeling by her bed when all at once, she saw a wheat field. The heads of the wheat each changed to those of children from different parts of the world. At the age of 13, she began to feel a calling to the religious life and to serve the needy of the earth. At the age of 15, she made a vow of perpetual chastity.

== Religious life ==
Deciding to act on her calling, at the age of 18, Tétreault asked to join the Carmelite monastery of Montreal, but they refused her. She then applied to the Sisters of Charity of Saint-Hyacinthe, who accepted her as a postulant. However, her poor health soon brought her back to her uncle's home. During that time, she was inspired to establish a missionary service for Canadian women, modelled on the Paris Foreign Missions Society. She was also involved in the creation of the seminary of the Société des Missions Étrangères de la Province de Québec.

=== Missionary Sisters of the Immaculate Conception ===
In 1891, Tétreault joined the Béthanie Centre in Montreal, which had been set up by the Jesuit priest Almire Pichon; she taught catechism and looked after people in need there for several years. During this time, she decided to form an apostolic school for women and a seminary for foreign missions. She met Gustave Bourassa, who acted as her guide in establishing connections with the people who would enable her to fulfill her goal. In 1902, Paul Bruchési, the Archbishop of Montreal, gave permission for the founding of the congregation. Two years later, he went to Rome and spoke to Pope Pius X about this new foundation. The pope immediately answered, "Found, found, and all the blessings of Heaven will fall upon this new institute and you will call them the Missionary Sisters of the Immaculate Conception".

In 1905, Tétreault took religious vows for the first time and the religious name Marie of the Holy Spirit. In 1909, the first six sisters of the new congregation left for Canton, China. Within a short time, several convents opened throughout Quebec to provide support for the missions of the congregation. In 1920, they launched a missionary review, Le Précurseur. On 2 February 1921, the seminary began to operate. By 1933, Tétreault had established 36 communities of the Missionary Sisters in Canada, China, Japan, and the Philippines.

In 1933, Tétreault became seriously ill. She died on 1 October 1941, and her body lay in state for four days at the motherhouse of the congregation. Approximately one thousand people came to pray over her remains. She was buried in the cemetery on the grounds of the motherhouse on 7 October.

== Beatification process ==
In 1958, the first steps were taken to open a beatification process. In 1982, the Archbishop of Montreal, Paul Grégoire, approved the process in view of the introduction of the cause in Rome. The canonical closure of the diocesan proceedings took place in 1997, and Pope John Paul II declared Tétreault as venerable.
