= Creative Secondary School =

Coordinates: 22.30757°N 114.26768°E

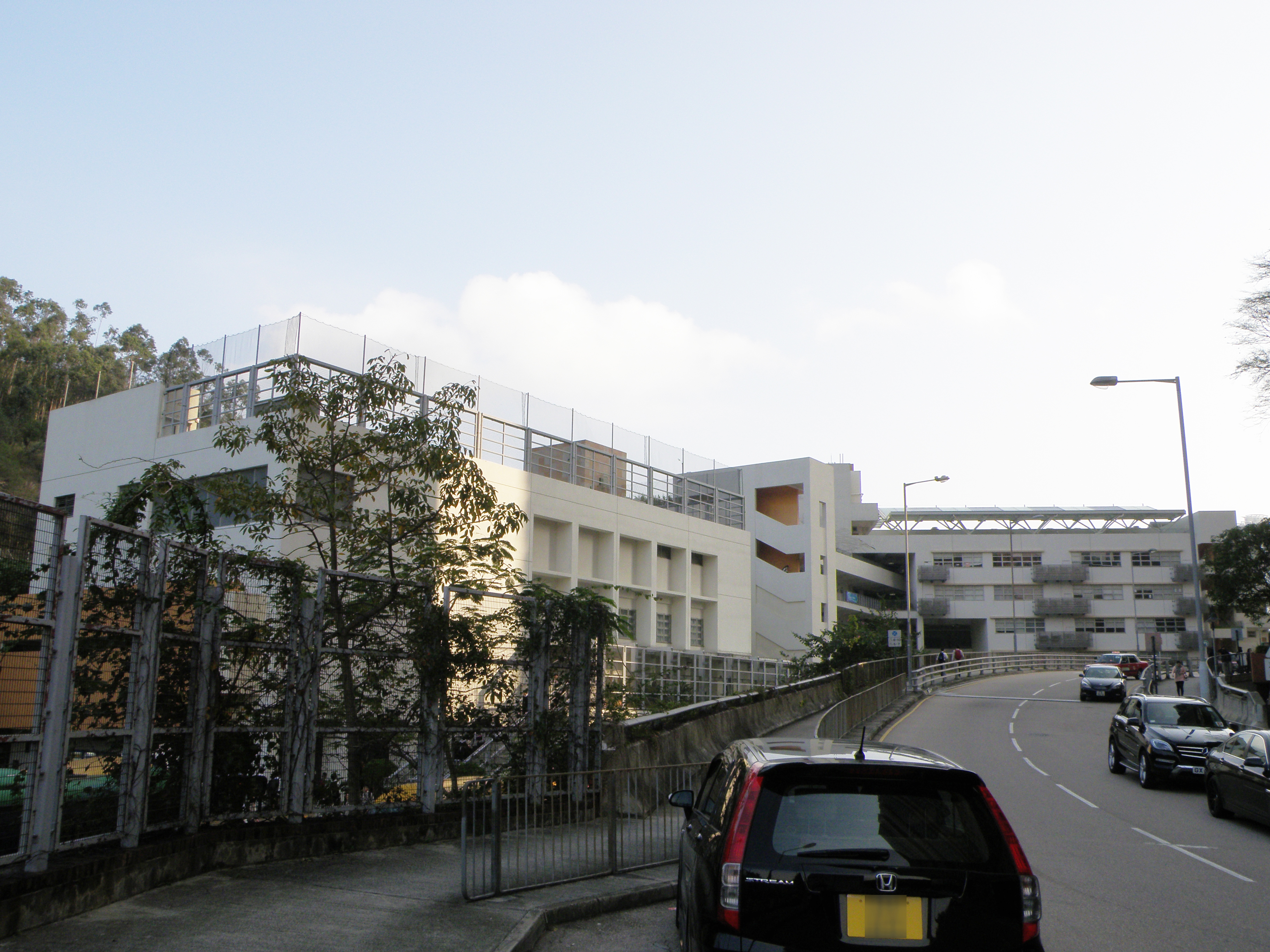

Location
- 3 Pung Loi Road, Tseung Kwan O, Hong Kong

Information
- Type: International School, DSS Secondary school
- Motto: "Through this place we thrive, we serve and find our place in the world." "Be Positive, Act Positively."
- Principal: Stephen Hindes
- Years offered: MY1-F6
- Gender: Co-educational
- Enrolment: 800 (for the academic year 2015-16)
- Campus: 8,000 m^{2} (86,000 sq ft)
- Website: www.css.edu.hk

Chinese name
- Traditional Chinese: 啓思中學
- Simplified Chinese: 启思中学
Transcriptions

Creative Secondary School (CSS; simplified Chinese: 启思中学; traditional Chinese: 啓思中學; pinyin: Qǐsī Zhōngxué) is a private school in Hong Kong under the DSS scheme, opened in September 2006. CSS offers both the IB Programme (which consists of the IB Middle Years Program and the IB Diploma) and Hong Kong's standard educational curriculum (Hong Kong Diploma of Secondary Education).

== Curriculum ==
CSS offers the IB Programme (which consists of the IB Middle Years Program and the IB Diploma.) and the standard Hong Kong DSE Diploma. The Creative Secondary School was one of the first in Hong Kong to offer a dual curriculum. In 2009, the school won the Hong Kong Odyssey of the Mind competition and represented Hong Kong at an international level.
