= Chinese Foundation Secondary School =

Secondary school in Siu Sai Wan, Hong Kong

Coordinates: 22.2643°N 114.2496°E

The Chinese Foundation Secondary School
- 9 Harmony Road, Siu Sai Wan, Hong Kong

Information
- Type: DSS, secondary, co-education
- Established: 18 March 2000
- Founder: Annie Wu
- Principal: Ho Tik Shun (2019–present)
- Staff: ~110 (80 teaching staff, 30 non-teaching staff)
- Grades: Secondary 1 - 6 (30 classes)
- Language: English, Chinese
- Website: http://www.cfss.edu.hk

Chinese Foundation Secondary School
- Traditional Chinese: 中華基金中學
- Simplified Chinese: 中华基金中学
Transcriptions
Standard Mandarin
- Hanyu Pinyin: Zhōnghuá Jījīn Zhōngxué
Yue: Cantonese
- Jyutping: zung1 waa4 gei1 gam1 zung1 hok6

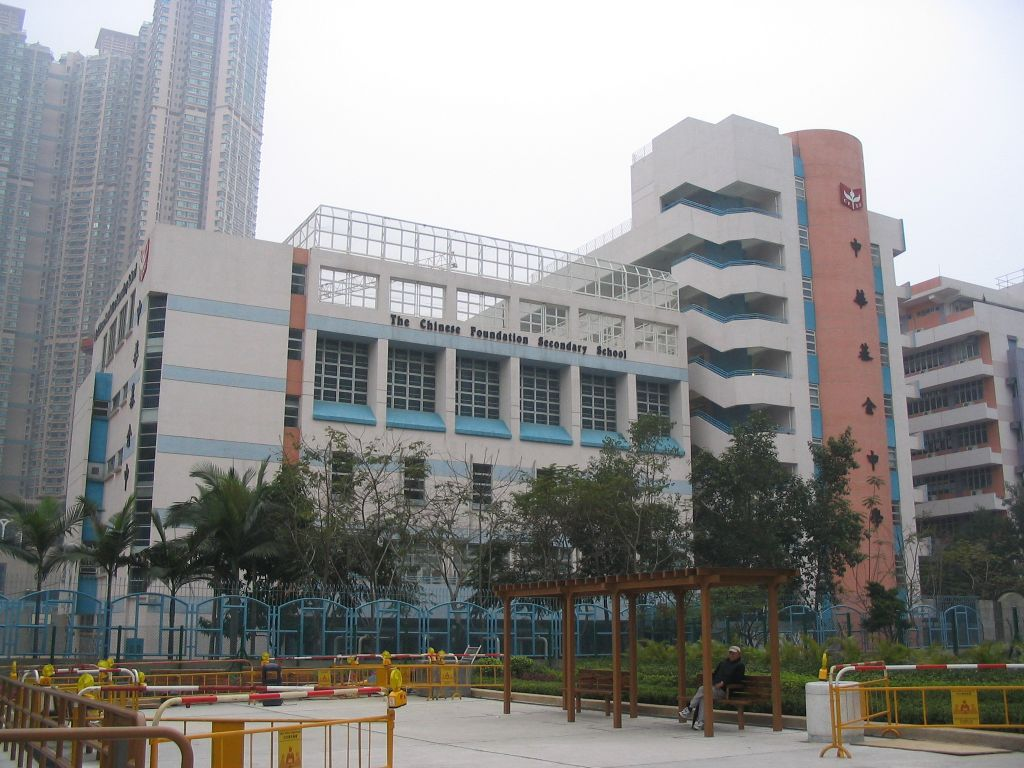
Chinese Foundation Secondary School

The Chinese Foundation Secondary School (CFSS, Chinese: 中華基金中學, 中基) is an English-medium co-educational secondary school located in Siu Sai Wan, Hong Kong. It is a Direct Subsidy Scheme school.

== Background ==
The school was founded on 18 March 2000 by Maxim's heiress and CPPCC member Annie Wu, through her Chinese History and Culture Educational Foundation.

The school building features an early millennium design providing 40% more activity space than traditional campus designs, built over seven storeys on a premises occupying a total area of approximately 7,460 square metres. In 2024, the Pickleball Association of Hong Kong, China established a training center at the school premises.

=== Controversy ===
In 2019, school founder Annie Wu controversially put pressure on the school to punish staff and students who supported the ongoing pro-democracy protests. Alumni gathered outside the entrance on September 4, 2019 to express their disappointment and anger towards the school's unsupportive attitude. Principal Ho Tik Shun clarified that police were not called and participating students would not face punishment if they had parental consent.

== Educational Philosophy ==
The school emphasizes science popularization. Its S1 and S2 curriculum includes "Enrichment Courses" designed to develop students' core competencies and discover their potential.

Following the Education Bureau's push for STEM and STEAM, the school adopted a "STREAM" approach by integrating "reading and writing" (R) into science education, addressing communication and literature research needs in project learning. The school runs a Project-Based Learning (PBL) school-based curriculum where teachers guide small groups of students through deep-dive research projects.

Following the Education Bureau's 2025 updated junior secondary science curriculum framework introducing Generative AI applications, principal Ho Tik Shun endorsed the appropriate use of GenAI for teaching and report generation to enhance active learning.

== Administration ==
=== Principals ===
- Chow Sik Cheong (2000–2009)
- Au Kwong Wing (2009–2019)
- Ho Tik Shun (2019–present)

=== Vice Principals ===
- Au Kwong Wing (2000–2009)
- Wong Siu Kwong (2009–2019)
- Wong Siu Kwong, Kwok Yat Fung (2019–2023)
- Kwok Yat Fung, Lam Chi Wai (2023–2024)
- Kwok Yat Fung (2024–2025)
- Kwok Yat Fung, Ho Chun Man (2025–present)

=== Assistant Principals ===
- Wong Siu Kwong, Hon See Hang (2006–2009)
- Hon See Hang, Lee Chi Man (2009–2010)
- Lee Chi Man, Lau Kai Yui (2010–2016)
- Lee Chi Man, Ho Tik Shun, Kwok Yat Fung (2016–2019)
- Lee Chi Man, Lam Chi Wai, Ho Chun Man (2019–2021)
- Lam Chi Wai, Ho Chun Man, Hui Yuk Fan (2021–2023)
- Ho Chun Man, Hui Yuk Fan, Leung Yu Shan (2023–2025)
- Leung Yu Shan, Cheng Wai Lok, Chan Kwok Leung (2025–2026)
- Leung Yu Shan, Cheng Wai Lok, Wong Man Cheung (2026–present)

== Green policies ==
=== Background ===
A Sustainable Development Team promotes sustainable development on campus, such as supporting energy-saving and environmental protection practices: temperature, lighting, green office procurement and operation principles, waste management and green laboratories.

=== Awards ===
CFSS has joined the Sustainable Development School Award Programme, and won "Gold Award School" two sessions in a row in 2009-2010 and 2010-2012 from the Council for Sustainable Development Hong Kong. It has also achieved the award of the status of Education for Sustainable Development (ESD) Experimental Schools in China presented by UNESCO China in September 2012.

== International prizes ==
Year	Award Title	Ranking
2024	International Mathematical Science and Creativity Competition (IMSCC) 2024 (Mechatronics II Division)	Gold Award & Special Award
2017	Microsoft Office Specialist (MOS) World Championship 2017-Microsoft Word 2016	World Championship
2013-14	World Robot Olympiad Hong Kong	2nd Runner-up
2013	Australian Informatics Competition 2013	Distinction & Credit
2013	International Junior Science Olympiad Hong Kong Screening 2013	3rd Class Honor
2012	The World Finals of the 64th Intel International Science and Engineering	The Third Place Grand Award

== Annual summer music event ==
Since 2003, CFSS has organized various cultural programs. There are varied activities, ranging from Chinese calligraphy to Western painting; from folk dance to opera.

Year	Program Title|
Since 2003	Cultural Festival
Since 2006	Culture & Knowledge Fair
Since 2008	Cultural Programs Scheme

A number of professionals and maestros were invited to broaden students' horizons in special topics: Percussion maestro Lung Heung Wing, shadow play master Wong Fai and explorer Rebecca Lee Lok Szeetc.

== See also ==
- Education in Hong Kong
