= Upper Ngau Tau Kok Estate =

Residential building in Hong Kong

Coordinates: 22°19′10″N 114°12′59″E

- Traditional Chinese: 牛頭角上邨
- Simplified Chinese: 牛头角上邨
Transcriptions
Standard Mandarin
- Hanyu Pinyin: Niútóujiǎo Shàng Cūn
Yue: Cantonese
- Jyutping: ngau4 tau4 gok3 soeng6 cyun1

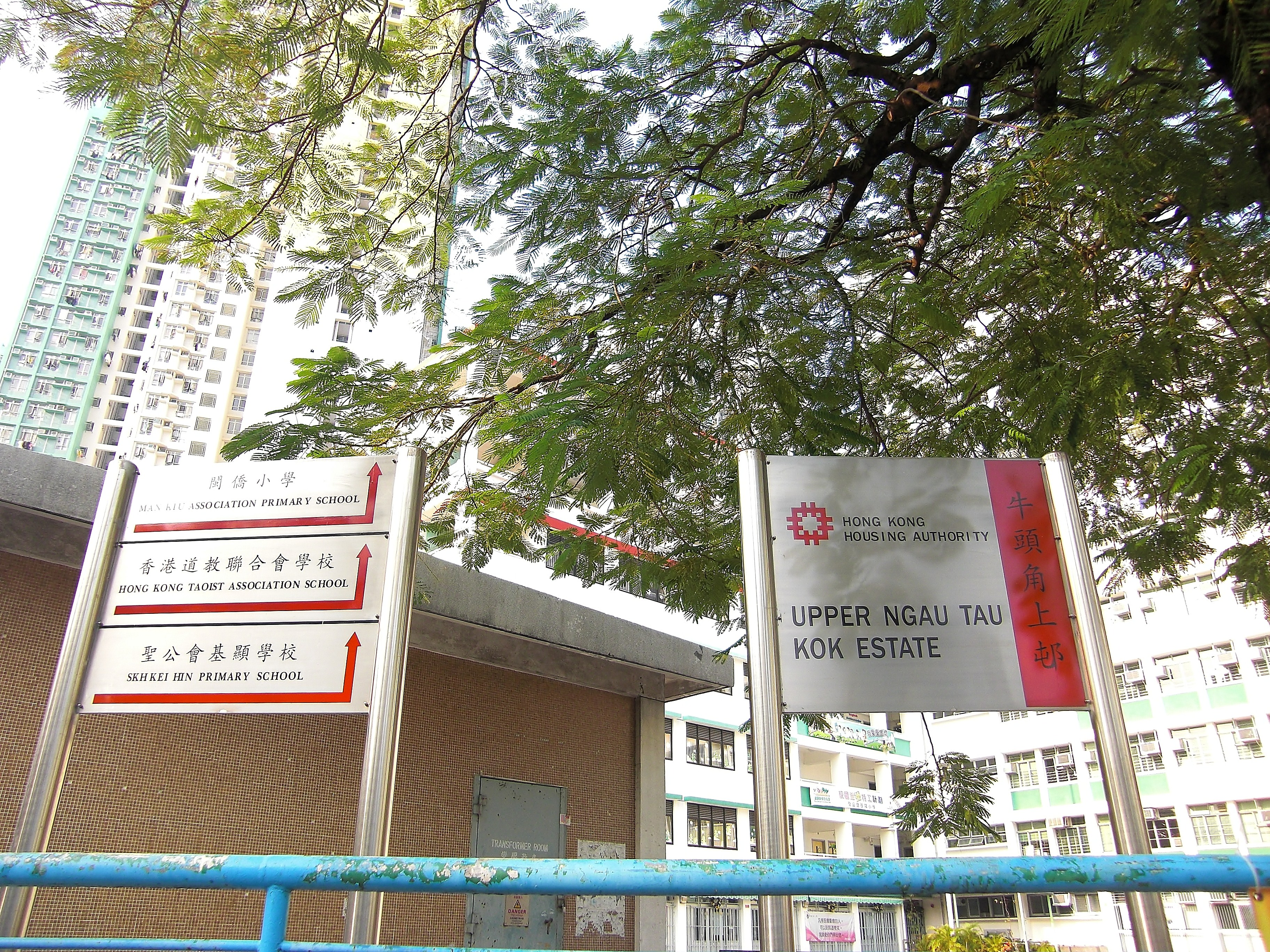
New Estate Board of Upper Ngau Tau Kok Estate

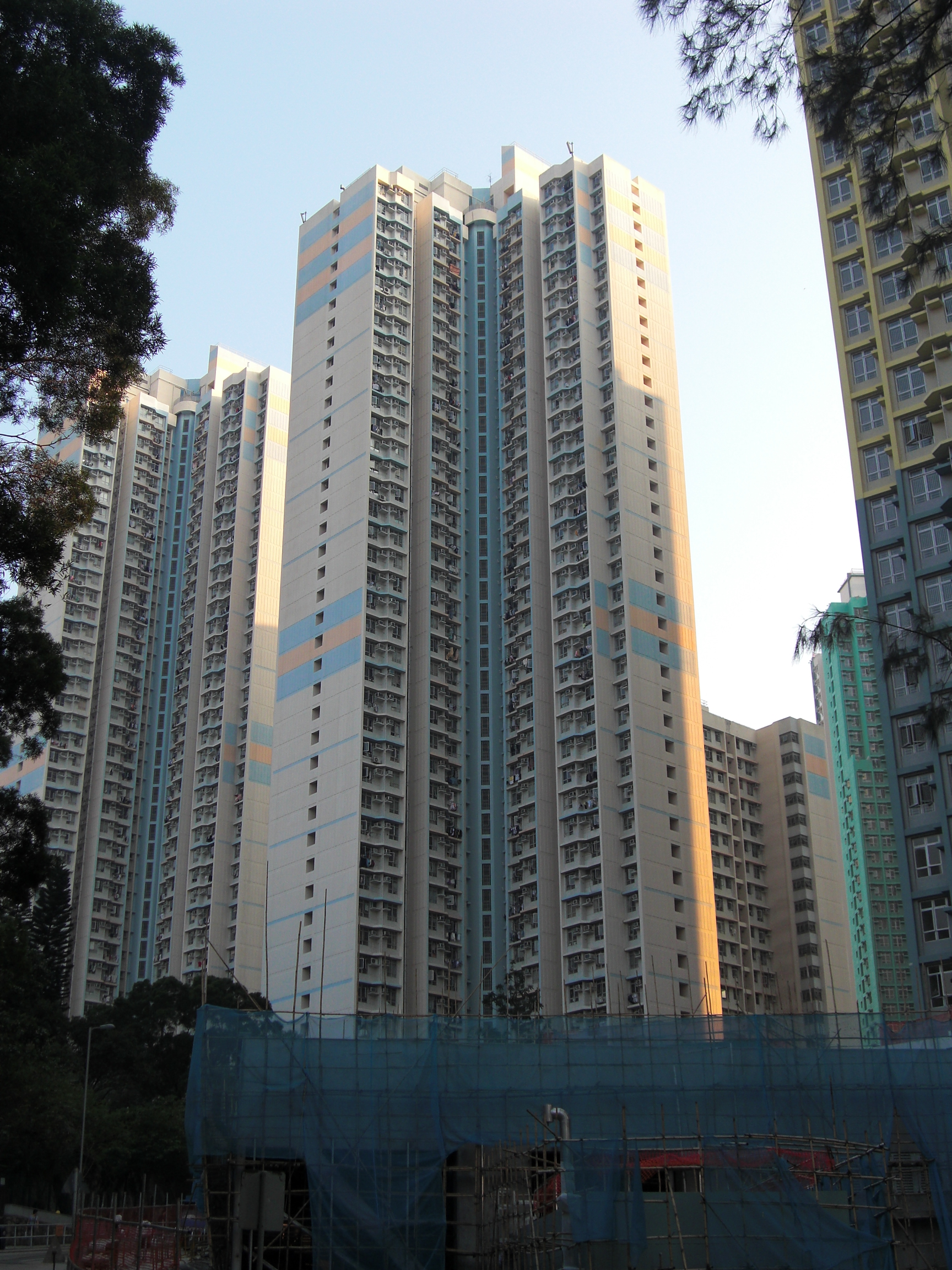
Upper Ngau Tau Kok Estate Phase 1

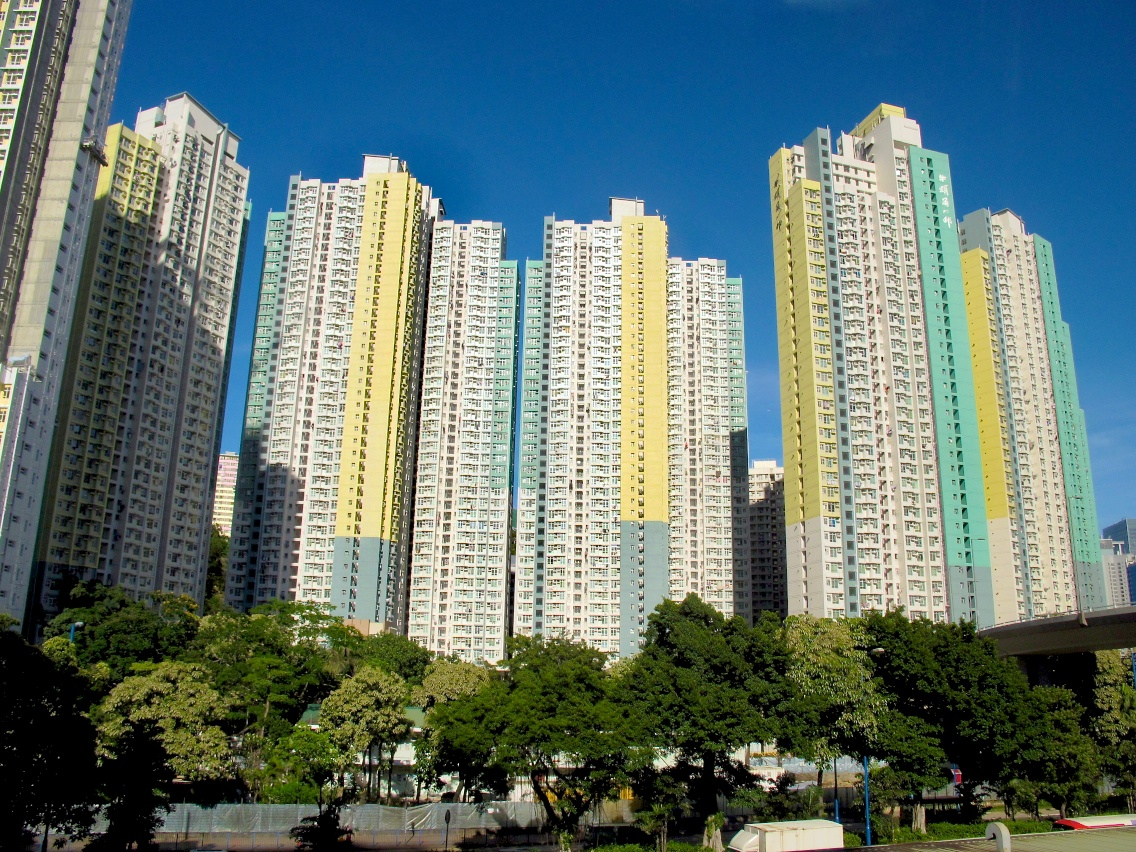
Upper Ngau Tau Kok Estate Phase 2 and 3

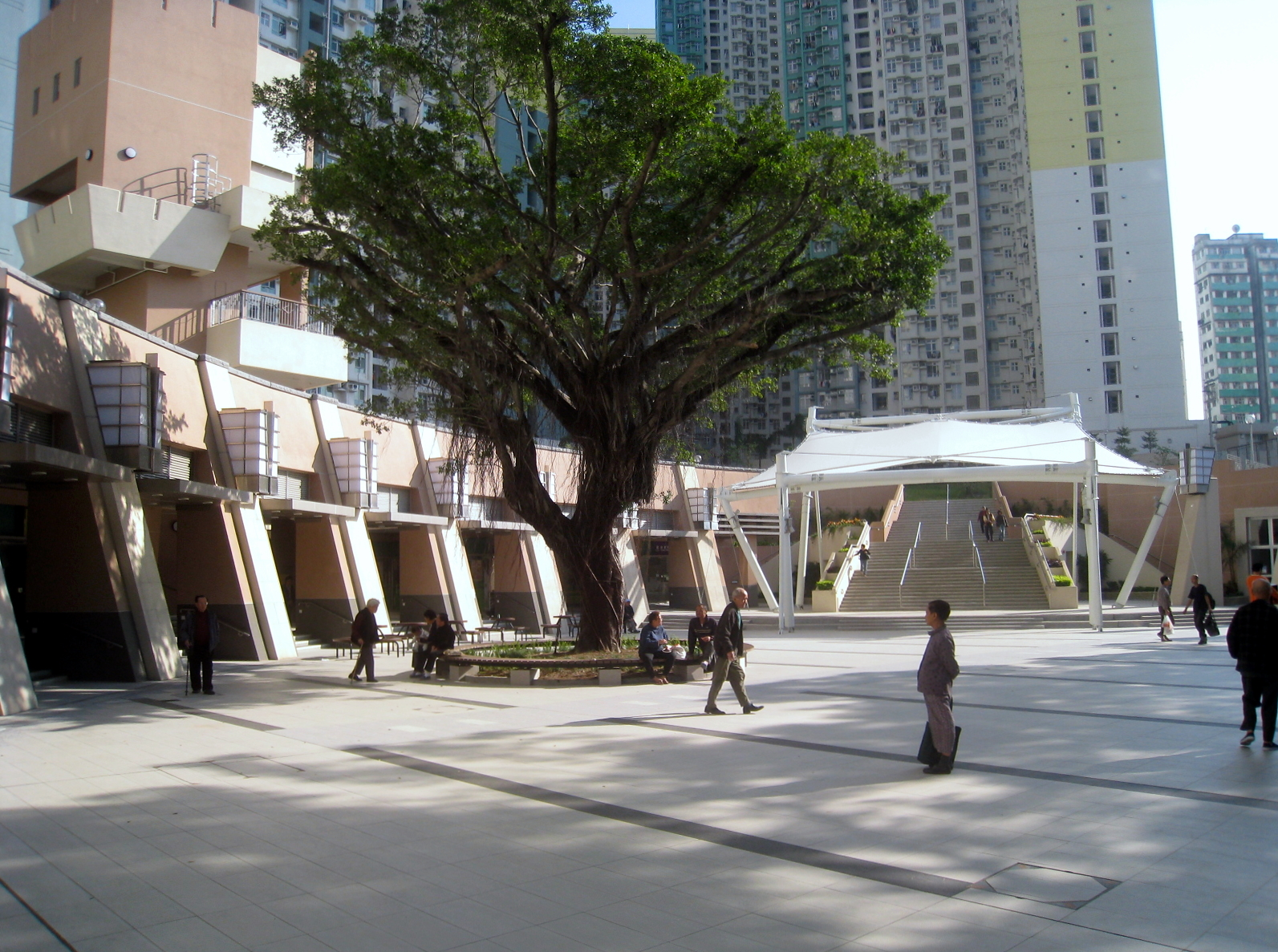
Entry Plaza of Upper Ngau Tau Kok Estate

Upper Ngau Tau Kok Estate (Chinese: 牛頭角上邨) is a public housing estate in Ngau Tau Kok, Kwun Tong, Kowloon, Hong Kong, located next to Kwun Tong Garden Estate and between MTR Ngau Tau Kok station and Kowloon Bay station. After redevelopment, the estate has 9 blocks developed into 3 phases.

== Background ==
The whole Ngau Tau Kok Estate was separated into Upper Ngau Tau Kok Estate and Lower Ngau Tau Kok Estate, developed in late 1960s. Upper Estate was a low cost housing estate with totally 9 blocks, while Lower Estate was a resettlement estate with totally 14 blocks.

Upper Ngau Tau Kok Estate started its Phase 1 redevelopment in 1998, in which 3 new blocks were constructed in 2003 to offer totally 2,133 units. Phases 2 & 3, which demolished Blocks 1-5 in 2003 and reconstruction started in 2005 and has 6 blocks with totally 4,584 units, were built in 2009. Most of the residents are those affected by the redevelopment of Lower Ngau Tau Kok Estate.

== Houses ==
Name	Type	Completion
Sheung Mun House	Harmony 1	2003
Sheung Yat House	Harmony 1	2003
Sheung Yuet House	Single Aspect Building	2003
Sheung Hing House	Harmony Special (Non Standard)	2009
Sheung Shing House	Harmony Special (Non Standard)	2009
Sheung Fu House	Harmony Special (Non Standard)	2009
Sheung Wing House	Harmony Special (Non Standard)	2009
Sheung Hong House	Harmony Special (Non Standard)	2009
Sheung Tai House	Harmony Special (Non Standard)	2009

== Education ==
Upper Ngau Tau Kok Estate is in Primary One Admission (POA) School Net 48. Within the school net are multiple aided schools (operated independently but funded with government money) and Kwun Tong Government Primary School.

== See also ==
- Lower Ngau Tau Kok Estate
