= United Christian College (Kowloon East) =

Private school in Hong Kong

- 滙基書院(東九龍)
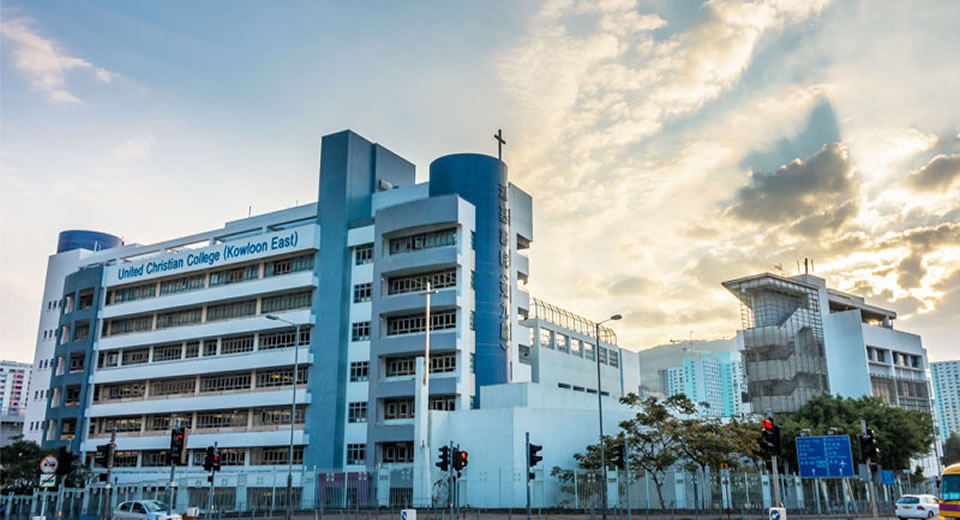
- United Christian College (Kowloon East) Campus

Location
- 2 Lee On Lane, Kwun Tong, Kowloon, Hong Kong
- Coordinates: 22.3309°N 114.2223°E

Information
- Type: Grant, DSS, secondary, co-educational, day, boarding
- Motto: Understanding Truth, Pursuing God, Developing Diligence, Cultivating Virtue
- Established: 2003; 23 years ago
- Principal: Dr. Cheng Kin Tak Samuel
- Forms: Form 1 to Form 6
- Enrollment: approx. 900
- Average class size: 14-34 (varies according to subject combination)
- Language: English, Chinese
- Publication: www.uccke.edu.hk/about-us/publications/
- Website: www.uccke.edu.hk

The United Christian College (Kowloon East) (UCCKE; Chinese: 滙基書院(東九龍) ) is a Direct Subsidy Scheme (DSS) Christian secondary school in Kwun Tong District, Hong Kong. Founded in 2003, it has an enrollment of about 900 students.

== Notable alumni ==
- Joshua Wong, Scholarism convener
- Ivan Lam, Scholarism convener
