= ECF Saint Too Canaan College =

Secondary school in Hong Kong

Coordinates: 22°19′51″N 114°13′24″E

Evangelize China Fellowship (ECF) Canaan College (基督教中國佈道會聖道迦南書院)
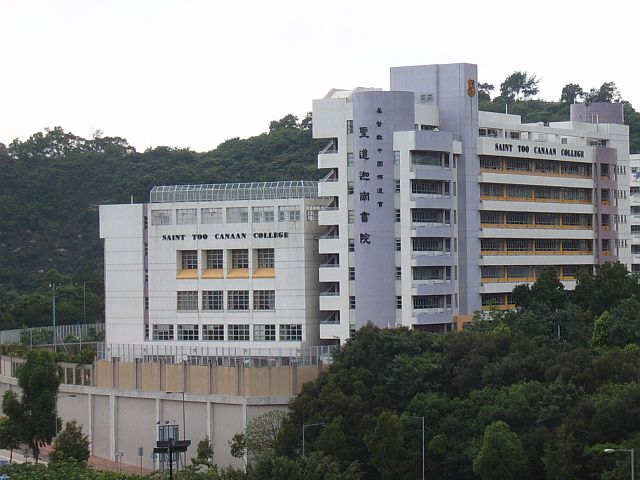
- No.6, Lee On Lane, Kwun Tong, Kowloon

Information
- Type: Direct Subsidy Scheme (DSS)
- Motto: Glorifying the holy God and honouring His words (崇聖敬道)
- Established: 2003
- School district: Kwun Tong District
- Principal: Mr. Lee Ka Ming
- Enrollment: About 900 students
- Affiliation: Evangelize China Fellowship
- Language of institute: English
- Website: http://www.stcc.edu.hk/

ECF Saint Too Canaan College
- Traditional Chinese: 基督教中國佈道會聖道迦南書院
- Simplified Chinese: 基督教中国布道会圣道迦南书院
Transcriptions
Standard Mandarin
- Hanyu Pinyin: Jīdūjiào Zhōngguó Bùdào Huì Shèng Dào Jiānán Shūyuàn
Yue: Cantonese
- Jyutping: gei1 duk1 gaau3 zung1 gwok3 bou3 dou6 wui6 sing3 dou6 gaa1 naam4 syu1 jyun6

ECF Saint Too Canaan College is a Direct Subsidy Scheme (DSS) secondary school in Kwun Tong district, Kowloon. The school has 24 classrooms, 12 special rooms, a hall, library, a covered playground, a basketball court, a volleyball court and a football field. It is a "millennium-designed" school. As of 2021, there are 24 classes taught at the institute.
