= NLSI Lui Kwok Pat Fong College =

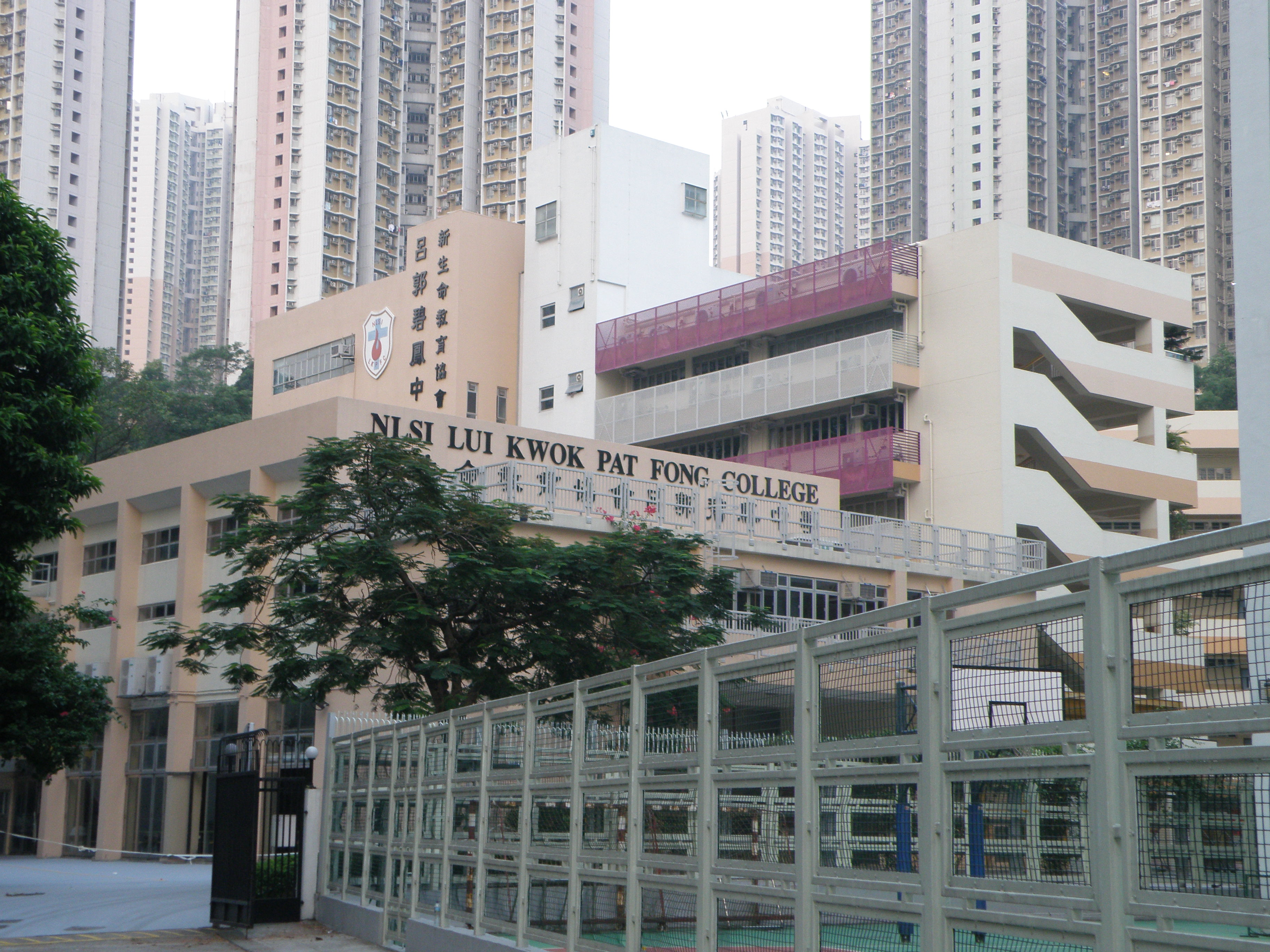
- 102 Tsui Ping Rd

Information
- Type: Subsidy secondary school
- Motto: Christ is the Lord of life
- Religious affiliation: Christian
- Established: 1969
- Principal: Mr. Cheung Fung
- Faculty: 66
- Language: English
- Affiliation: N.L.S.I.
- Website: lkpfc.edu.hk

NLSI Lui Kwok Pat Fong College (Chinese: 新生命教育協會呂郭碧鳳中學, abbreviated LKPFC), formerly known as 'New Life School', is a Hong Kong secondary school located in Tsui Ping Road, Kwun Tong district.

== Introduction ==
Established in 1969 by the "N.L.S.I.", the school started as a co-education grammar school with the aim of providing Christian holistic education for Hong Kong youth. At its beginning, there were only 32 students with only four staff members. The lessons were conducted at the Chinese Rhenish Church Hong Kong on Bonham Road on the Hong Kong Island.

The present principal of LKPFC is Cheung Fung. The school is a Christian school, belonging to the N.L.S.I. It covers an area of about 7300 square meters. LKPFC is an English as medium-of-instruction school.

== Mission and vision ==
The motto of the school is "Christ is the Lord of life".

== History ==
In 1971, the school moved to the Hong Kong Swatow Christian Church on Shelley Street in Central, where they grew the number of classrooms borrowed to 11.

In 1972, the teaching philosophy and achievements of the school were acknowledged by the Hong Kong Government and funding was granted. Students who passed the Secondary School Places Allocation (SSPA) (香港中學學位分配辦法) entered the school.

In 1974, the students participated in the Hong Kong Certificate of Education Examination (香港中學會考) for the first time.

In 1979, funded by the Lui Ming Choi Education Fund, together with the allotted land and funding from the government, the school launched its plan to build a new campus in Kwun Tong.

In 1982, the school officially became a government-funded secondary school.

In 1985, the school borrowed a primary school campus in Sau Mau Ping (秀茂坪), and was officially named "NLSI Lui Kwok Pat Fong College".

In 1986, the school officially moved to Tsui Ping Road, Kwun Tong District.

In 2004, the newly expanded building was put into use.

== Alumni ==
- Joel Chan Shan Chung: TVB Actor
- Kayee Tam Ka Yee: TVB Actress, Singer
- Dr Yvonne Lui Lai Kwan: Executive Director of Chinese Estates Holdings Limited
- Frankie Ngan Man-yu: District Council of Kwun Tong District
- Herman Ho Tsz Fung: Famous Liberal Studies Subject Leader of Hong Kong
