= Fukien Secondary School =

Secondary school in Kwun Tong, Hong Kong

Coordinates: 22.3225°N 114.2215°E

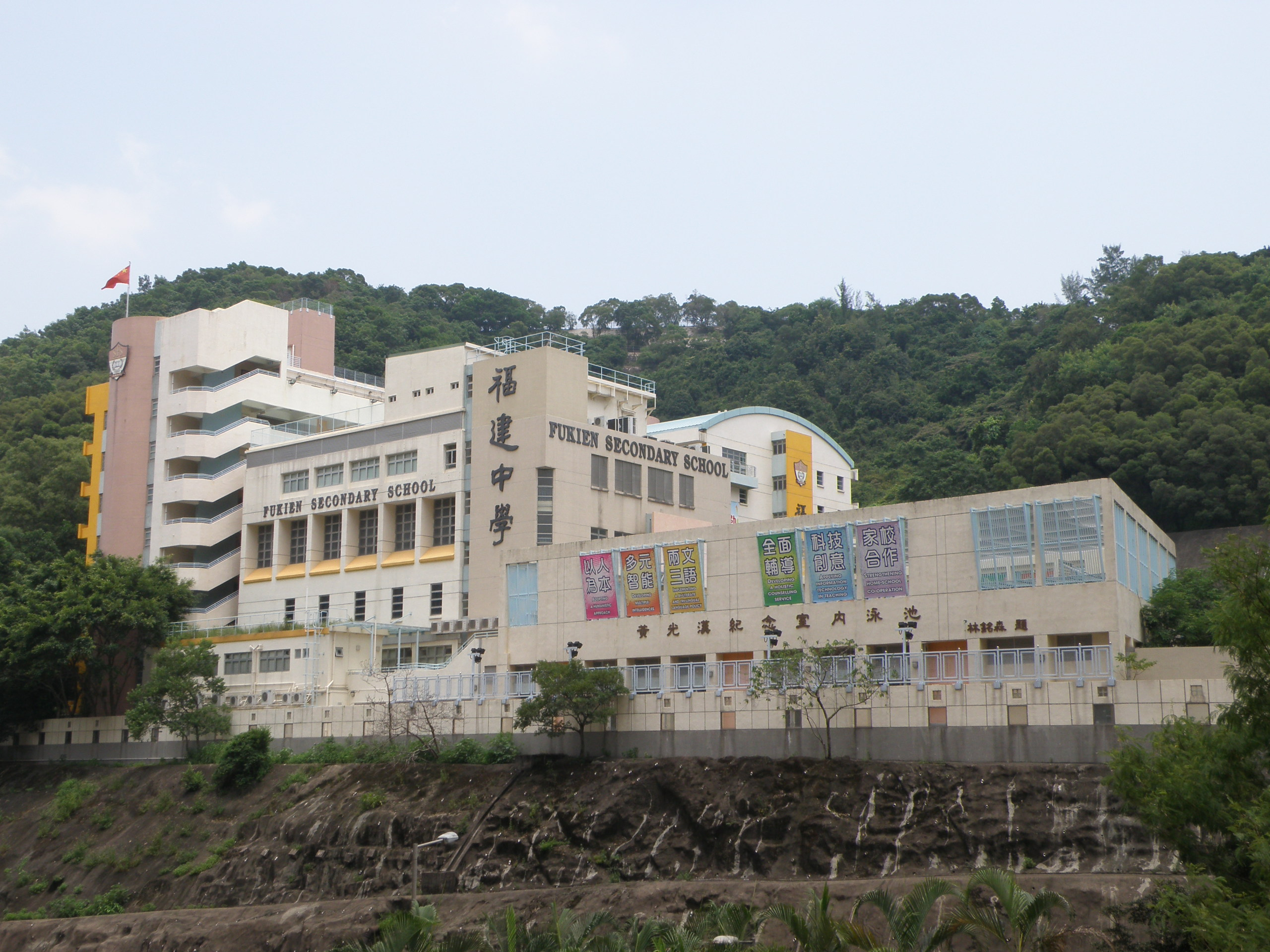
- Fukien Secondary School exterior
- Ngau Tau Kok, Hong Kong

Information
- Type: Direct Subsidy Scheme
- Motto: In pursuit of truthfulness and perfection
- Established: 1951
- Principal: Ng Wang Kee
- Faculty: 100 teachers
- Website: fms.edu.hk

Fukien Secondary School
- Traditional Chinese: 福建中學
- Simplified Chinese: 福建中学
Transcriptions
Standard Mandarin
- Hanyu Pinyin: Fújiàn Zhōngxué
Yue: Cantonese
- Jyutping: fuk1 gin3 zung1 hok6

Fukien Secondary School (Chinese: 福建中學) is a Direct Subsidy Scheme co-educational secondary school in Ngau Tau Kok, Kowloon, Hong Kong. It is sponsored by the Fukien Chamber of Commerce and was founded in 1951.

== History ==
The school was founded by the Fukien Chamber of Commerce in 1951 in an apartment building in Western. It moved to a new campus on Java Road in North Point in 1966, and then to Kwun Tong in September 2000.

Amid criticism of falling English standards among Hong Kong students in the late 1990s, the Education Department invited ten Chinese-as-medium-of-instruction schools to teach a maximum of three subjects in English. Under this scheme, the school began in 2000 to offer an English stream, teaching certain history, maths, and science courses in English. Starting from the 2013–2014 academic year, all junior secondary (S1–S3) classes have adopted English as the medium of instruction. The school has a policy of "bi-literacy and tri-lingualism". (Note: A language education policy of the Government of Hong Kong aiming to enable students to be able to write in Chinese and English (bi-literacy); and communicate in Cantonese, English, and Putonghua (tri-lingualism).)

The school, along with its sister schools managed by the same sponsor, was criticised in 2002 for asking students and parents to attend a pro-Beijing demonstration at Victoria Park in support of the controversial Article 23 national security law. The head of the Professional Teachers' Union condemned the "use of students for political purposes".

In mid-July 2009, the Fukien Chamber of Commerce took over the sponsorship of Pegasus Philip Wong Kin Hang Christian Primary cum Junior Secondary School in Yau Tong, and renamed it the Fukien Secondary School Affiliated School. This came after the school's original operator, the Pegasus Social Service Christian Organisation, abruptly pulled its sponsorship in May 2009. The Chamber bought 60 new computers and refurbished the libraries, gymnasium, and table tennis room. The former Pegasus students also had to sing the Chinese national anthem at assembly for the first time.

== Sister schools ==
- Fukien Secondary School Affiliated School
- Fukien Secondary School (Siu Sai Wan)
