= Apostolic school =

An apostolic school is a missionary college of the Roman Catholic Church which trains the secular clergy for missionary work abroad. The first apostolic school was opened at Avignon in 1865 by Alberic de Foresta. His desire was to give boys with an ecclesiastical bent but without means a way to enter the clergy. The course of studies comprises training in the classics from Latin and Greek, and modern languages, and in mathematics. Most Catholic religious orders now have apostolic schools for the recruitment of their own ranks or for foreign missions.

== History ==
Apostolic schools, as distinct from junior ecclesiastical seminaries, owed their origin to the Jesuit priest Alberic de Foresta (b. 1818; d. 1876). He formed the design of opening a school where youths who gave promise of an ecclesiastical vocation, and who were disposed to go and labour on foreign missions, might be properly trained. With the approval of his superiors, de Foresta opened the first apostolic school at Avignon in 1865 The course of studies in the apostolic school comprised training in the Latin and Greek classics, in modern languages, and in mathematics. The residence of the scholars was near one of the colleges of the Society of Jesus; the pupils attended classes along with the students of the college.

In 1868 similar apostolic schools were established at Amiens and Turin; in 1869 one was opened at Poitiers, in 1871 at Turnhout in Belgium and at New Orleans, in 1873 at Bordeaux, in 1874 at Tananarive, in 1877 at Dole and at Monaco, and in 1879 at Boulogne-sur-Mer. Pope Pius IX, in a Brief dated 12 April, 1867, blessed the work of the apostolic schools, and in Briefs dated 30 June, 1870, and 15 May, 1877, repeated his approval and bestowed indulgences on them and on those who promoted them. Anticlerical legislation in France after 1880 was an obstacle. The apostolic school of Avignon relocated to Eremo Lanzo, in the neighbourhood of Turin. The school at Bordeaux moved to Vitoria, in Spain. The Amiens apostolic school transferred to Littlehampton, in England, and thence to Thieu, in the Diocese of Tournai, Belgium. When the schools of Avignon, Amiens, Turnhout, Poitiers, and Bordeaux had been about thirty years in existence, they had educated about one thousand missionaries.

The Jesuit Fathers set up an apostolic school at Mungret College, near Limerick, in Ireland. The Mungret apostolic school owes its origin to William Ronan. In the course of his missionary work throughout Ireland, Ronan had met many boys who gave signs of an ecclesiastical vocation, but who, from lack of means or other causes, were unable to attain the object of their aspirations. Ronan was eventually appointed rector of the Jesuit college at Limerick, and he then conceived the idea of opening an apostolic school in connection with that establishment. On 24 September, 1880, a commencement was made with eight pupils. Ronan, the first rector, visited the United States in 1884 to raise funds.

Most Catholic religious orders and congregations established apostolic schools for the recruitment of their own ranks or for the foreign missions: the Vincentians, the Salesians, the Fathers of the Holy Ghost, the Mill Hill Missionaries, the White Fathers, the African Missionaries of Lyon, the Missionaries of the Sacred Heart, the Missionaries of Mont-St-Michel, the Dominicans, Franciscans, and Redemptorists.
