= Kwun Tong Garden Estate =

Housing estate in Kwun Tong, Hong Kong

Coordinates: 22.317°N 114.219°E

- Traditional Chinese: 觀塘花園大廈
- Simplified Chinese: 观塘花园大厦
- Cantonese Yale: gūn tòhng fā yún daaih hah
Transcriptions
Standard Mandarin
- Hanyu Pinyin: Guàntáng Huāyuán Dàshà
Yue: Cantonese
- Yale Romanization: gūn tòhng fā yún daaih hah
- Jyutping: gun1 tong4 faa1 jyun4 daai6 haa6

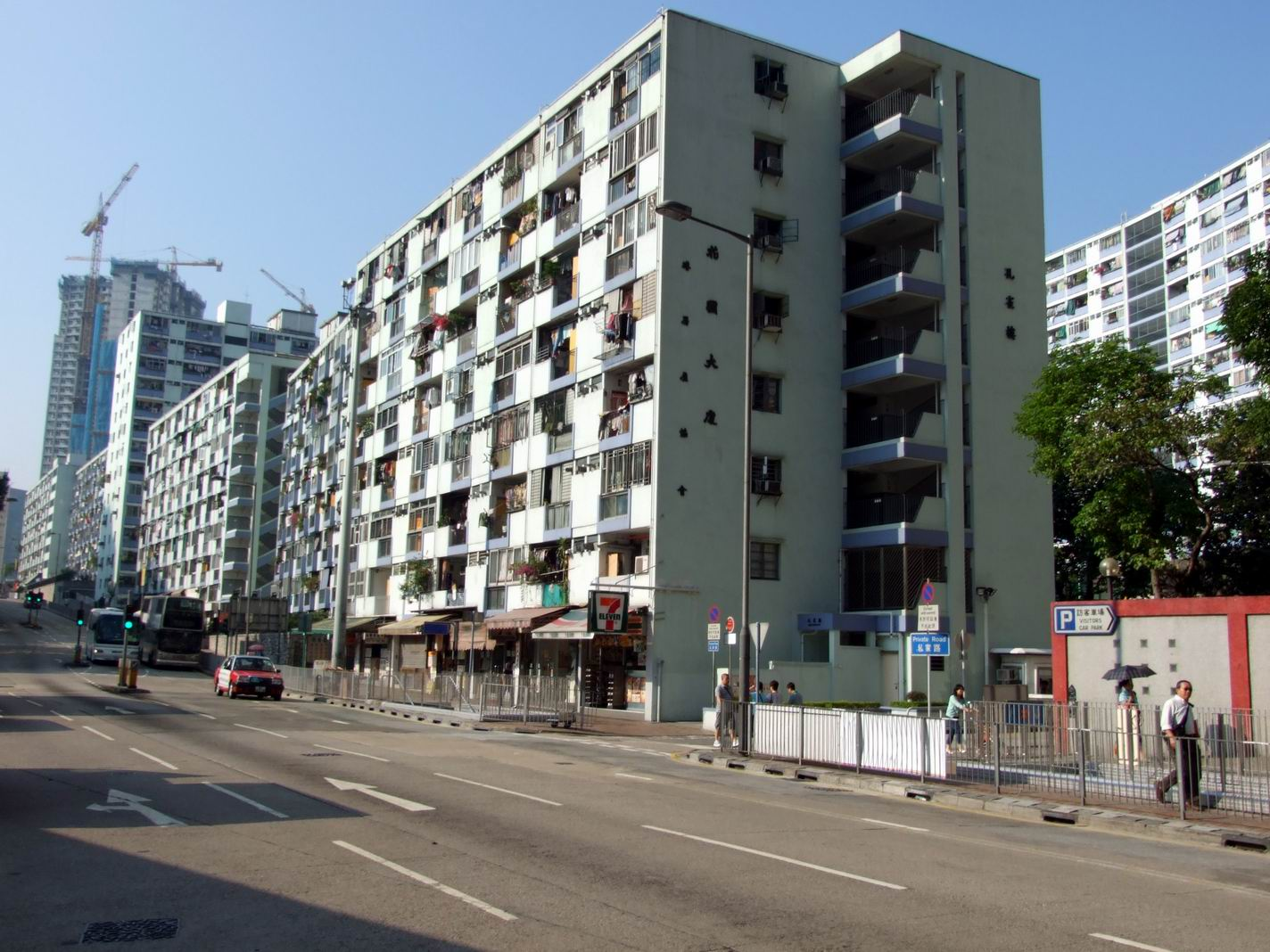
Hung Cheuk Lau, Kwun Tong Garden Estate

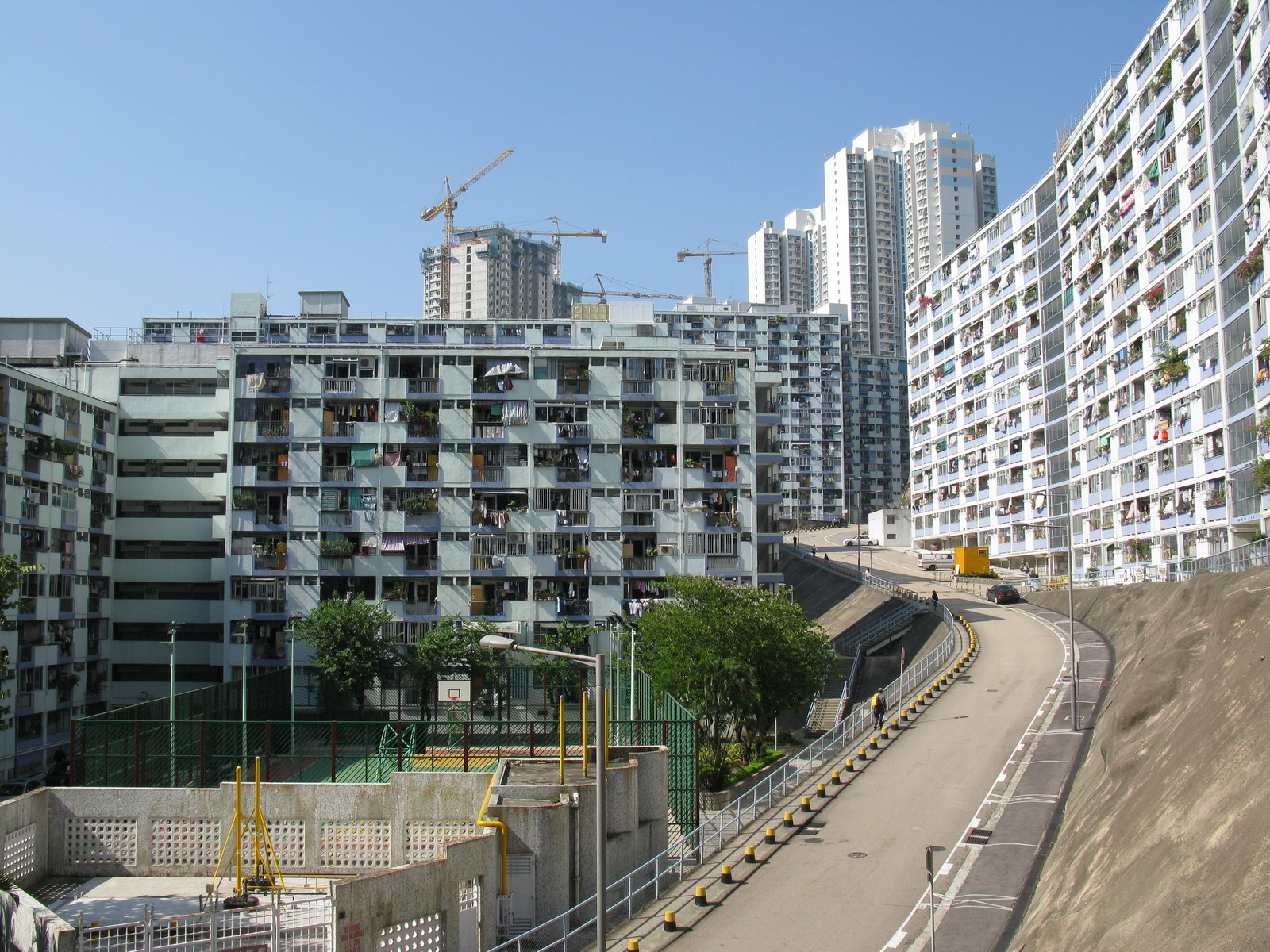
Hung Cheuk Lau and Wah Mei Lau, Kwun Tong Garden Estate

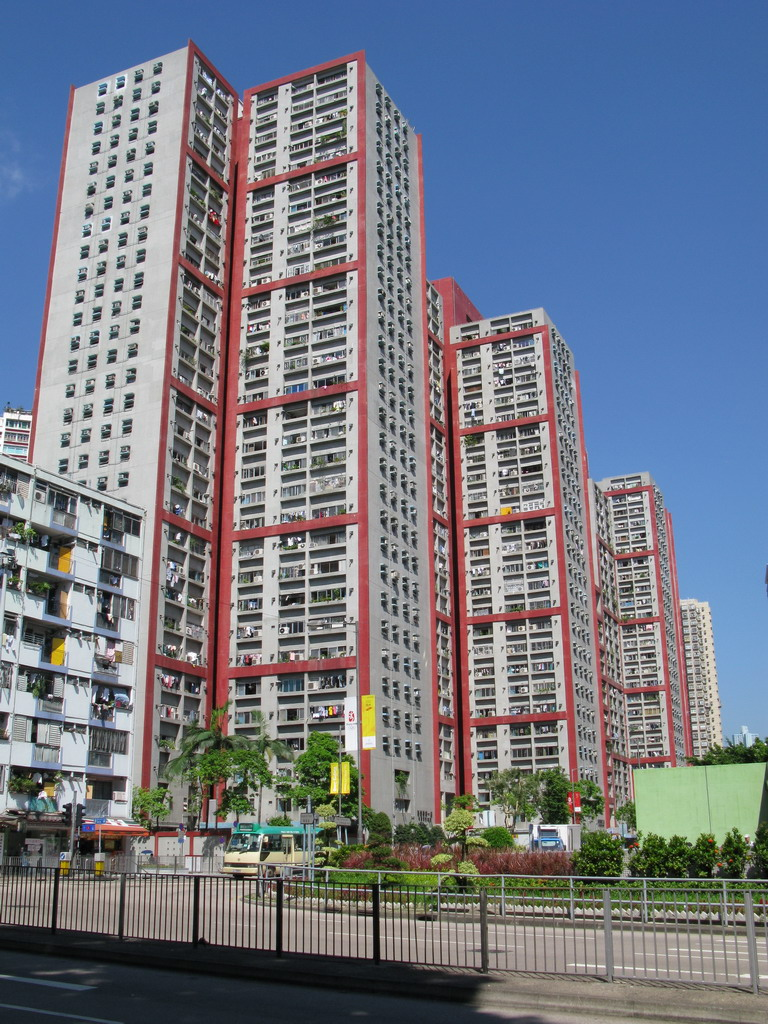
Lotus Tower

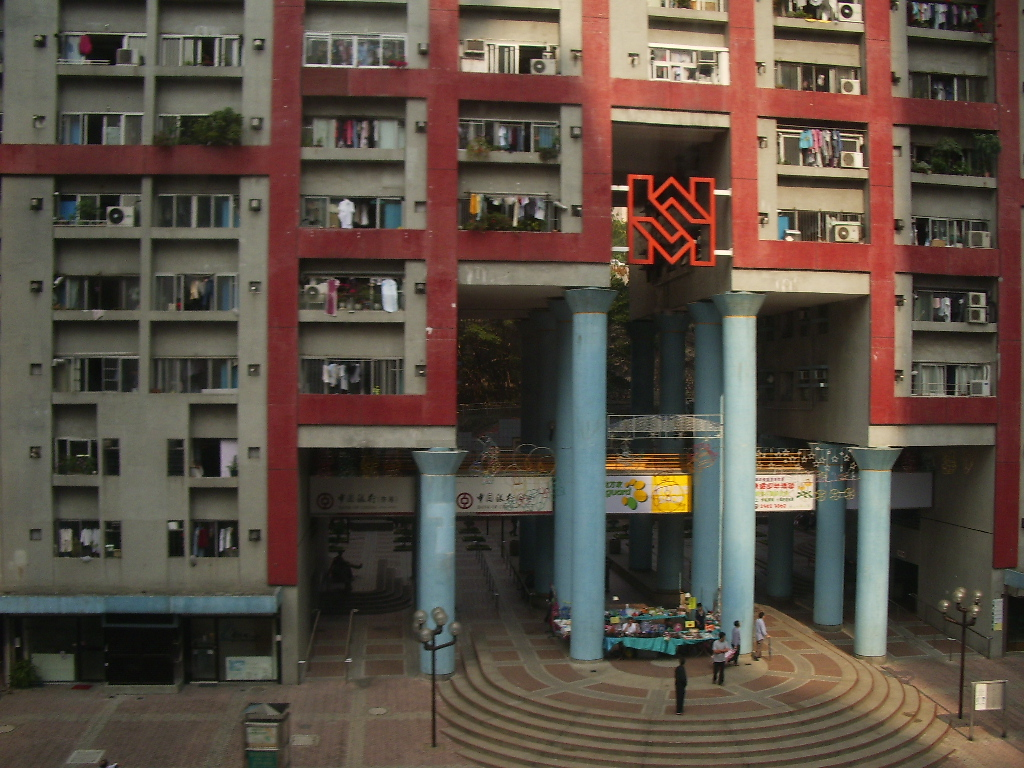
Entrance of Lotus Tower

Kwun Tong Garden Estate (Chinese: 觀塘花園大廈), or Garden Estate (Chinese: 花園大廈), is a public housing estate in Ngau Tau Kok, Kwun Tong, Kowloon, Hong Kong, developed by the Hong Kong Housing Society, near the MTR Kwun Tong line's Ngau Tau Kok station. It is the largest Housing Society estate by number of flats (4,921).

== History ==
It was the first public housing estate in Kwun Tong District. It comprises five blocks built in 1965 and 1967 respectively, plus Lotus Tower (Chinese: 玉蓮臺), which comprises four blocks built on the site of the earliest Garden Estate blocks.

Kwun Tong Garden Estate was built by the Hong Kong Housing Society between the 1950s and 1960s to accommodate the workers working in the industrial area on the newly reclaimed land along Kwun Tong harbourfront. 7 blocks of Phase 1 were completed in 1958 and 1959, while 5 blocks of Phase 2 were completed in 1965 and 1967. To cope with the redevelopment project of the estate, Phase 1 blocks were demolished in 1983 and 1987 respectively. They were replaced by the blocks of Lotus Tower built in 1987 (Block 4) and 1990 (Block 1 to 3) respectively.

== Demographics ==
According to the 2016 population by-census, Kwun Tong Garden Estate has a population of 12,578. 97% of the population is Chinese. Median monthly domestic household income is HK$15,500.

== Houses ==
=== Kwun Tong Garden Estate ===
Name	Completion
Hay Cheuk Lau	1965, 1967
Wah Mei Lau	1965, 1967
Pak Ling Lau	1965, 1967
Hung Cheuk Lau	1965, 1967
Yin Chee Lau	1965, 1967

=== Lotus Tower ===
Name	Completion
Block 1	1990
Block 2	1990
Block 3	1990
Block 4	1987
