= List of international schools in Hong Kong =

The list of international schools in Hong Kong is arranged according to the 18 districts of Hong Kong. All international schools in Hong Kong use English and Chinese as mediums of instruction to varying extents.

== Curricula ==
International schools in Hong Kong use various curricula, the most common ones being:

- International Baccalaureate
  - IB Primary Years Programme (PYP)
  - IB Middle Years Programme (MYP)
  - IB Diploma Programme (DP)
  - IB Career-related Programme (CP)
- International General Certificate of Secondary Education (IGCSE)
- A-level
- Advanced Placement (AP)

Some local schools use international curricula in addition to the local Hong Kong Diploma of Secondary Education (HKDSE) curriculum.

== Cross-district schools ==
Image	Name (Abbreviation)	Curriculum	Affiliation	Established	Campus districts
	Carmel School Hong Kong (Carmel)	IBPYP/MYP/DP	Jews in Hong Kong	1991	Central and Western, Eastern
	French International School of Hong Kong (FIS)	French Stream: Diplôme national du brevet, Baccalauréat, Baccalauréat Français International International Stream: IGCSE, IBDP	Agency for French Education Abroad	1963	Sai Kung, Eastern, Southern
	German Swiss International School (GSIS)	English International Stream: IGCSE, IBDP German International Stream: Curriculum of Thuringia, German International Abitur	Germans, Swiss people and Austrians in Hong Kong	1969	Central and Western, Southern
	International Montessori School (IMS)	Montessori education	IMEF Association Montessori Internationale	2002	Central and Western, Southern, Eastern
	Kellett School (Kellett)	IGCSE, A-level	Britons in Hong Kong	1976	Southern, Kwun Tong District

== Central and Western District ==
Image	Name (Abbreviation)	Curriculum	Affiliation	Established
	Glenealy School (Glenealy)	IBPYP	English Schools Foundation	1959
	Island School (Island)	IBMYP (Y7-9), IGCSE (Y10-11), IBDP/CP (Y12-13)	English Schools Foundation	1967
	Peak School (PS)	IBPYP	English Schools Foundation	1911
	St. Paul's Co-educational College (SPCC)	HKDSE, IBDP		1915
	St. Paul's College, Hong Kong (SPC)	HKDSE, A-level		1851

== Eastern District ==
Image	Name (Abbreviation)	Curriculum	Affiliation	Established
	Chinese International School (CIS)	School-based curriculum (Y1-6, 10-11), IBMYP (Y7-9)/DP (Y12-13)		1983
	DSC International School, Hong Kong (DSC)	Ontario Secondary School Diploma	CTF Education Group Canadians in Hong Kong	1986
	Kiangsu and Chekiang Primary School (KCPS)	Early Years Foundation Stage, National Curriculum for England	Kiangsu and Chekiang Residents' Association of Hong Kong	1953
	Kiangsu-Chekiang College, International Section (KCCIS)	IGCSE, IBDP	Kiangsu and Chekiang Residents' Association of Hong Kong	1993
	Korean International School of Hong Kong (KIS)	International Section: IGCSE, A-level Korean Section: Korean Basic Curriculum	Koreans in Hong Kong	1994
	Quarry Bay School (QBS)	IBPYP	English Schools Foundation	1926

== Islands District ==
Image	Name (Abbreviation)	Curriculum	Affiliation	Established
	Discovery Bay International School (DBIS)	IGCSE, A-level	HKR International	1983
	Discovery College (Discovery)	IBPYP/MYP/DP/CP	English Schools Foundation	2009
	Lantau International School (LIS)	National Curriculum for England		1995
	YMCA of Hong Kong Christian College (YHKCC)	HKDSE, A-level	YMCA of Hong Kong	2003

== Kowloon City District ==
Image	Name (Abbreviation)	Curriculum	Affiliation	Established
	American International School Hong Kong (AIS)	AP	Americans in Hong Kong	1986
	Australian International School Hong Kong (AISHK)	Australian Curriculum, Higher School Certificate (New South Wales), IBDP	Australians in Hong Kong	1995
	Beacon Hill School (BHS)	IBPYP	English Schools Foundation	1967
	Christian Alliance P.C. Lau Memorial International School (CAPCL)	Alberta Curriculum	Kowloon Tong Church of the Chinese Christian and Missionary Alliance	1992
	Jockey Club Sarah Roe School (JCSRS)	Special education	English Schools Foundation	1985
	King George V School, Hong Kong (KGV)	IBMYP (Y7-9), IGCSE (Y10-11), IBDP/BTEC Extended Diploma (Y12-13)	English Schools Foundation	1894
	Kingston International School (Kingston)	IBPYP	International College Hong Kong	1996
	Kowloon Junior School (KJS)	IBPYP	English Schools Foundation	1902
	Po Leung Kuk Ngan Po Ling College (NPL)	HKDSE, IBDP	Po Leung Kuk	2003
	Stamford American School Hong Kong (SAIS)	IBDP	Cognita Americans in Hong Kong	2017
	Think International School (TIS)	IBPYP		2002
	Yew Chung International School (YCIS)	National Curriculum for England (Y1-6), school-based curriculum (Y7-9), IGCSE (Y10-11), IBDP (Y12-13)	Yew Chung Yew Wah Education Network	1932

== Kwun Tong District ==
Image	Name (Abbreviation)	Curriculum	Affiliation	Established
	Nord Anglia International School Hong Kong (NAIS)	IGCSE, IBDP	Nord Anglia Education	2014
	United Christian College (Kowloon East) (UCCKE)	HKDSE, A-level		2003
	YK Pao School Hong Kong (YKPS)	IBPYP	YK Pao Education Foundation YK Pao School	2026

== North District ==
Image	Name (Abbreviation)	Curriculum	Affiliation	Established
	International College Hong Kong (ICHK)	IGCSE/BTEC First Diploma (Y10-11), IBDP (Y12-13)	International College Hong Kong Hong Lok Yuen Kingston International School (Hong Kong)	2009

== Sai Kung District ==
Image	Name (Abbreviation)	Curriculum	Affiliation	Established
	Clearwater Bay School (CWBS)	IBPYP	English Schools Foundation	1992
	Creative Secondary School (CSS)	HKDSE, IBDP		2006
	G.T. (Ellen Yeung) College (GT)	HKDSE, IBDP	Gifted Education Association	1996
	Hong Kong Academy (HKA)	IBPYP/MYP/DP		2000
	Hong Kong Chinese Christian Churches Union Logos Academy (HKCCCULA)	HKDSE, IBDP	Hong Kong Chinese Christian Churches Union	2002
	Shrewsbury International School Hong Kong (Shrewsbury)	National Curriculum for England	Shrewsbury International Asia	2018

== Sha Tin District ==
Image	Name (Abbreviation)	Curriculum	Affiliation	Established
	Hong Kong Baptist University Affiliated School Wong Kam Fai Secondary and Primary School (HKBUAS)	HKDSE, A-level	Hong Kong Baptist University	2006
	International Christian School (Hong Kong) (ICS)	AP		1992
	Li Po Chun United World College (LPCUWC)	IBDP	United World Colleges	1992
	Pui Kiu College (PKC)	HKDSE, NCUK International Foundation Year		2005
	Renaissance College (RCHK)	IBPYP/MYP/DP/CP	English Schools Foundation	2006
	Sha Tin College (STC)	IGCSE, IBMYP/DP/CP	English Schools Foundation	1982
	Sha Tin Junior School (SJS)	IBPYP	English Schools Foundation	1988
	Stewards Pooi Kei College (SPKC)	HKDSE, A-level		2004

== Sham Shui Po District ==
Image	Name (Abbreviation)	Curriculum	Affiliation	Established
	Christian Alliance International School [zh] (CAIS)	Alberta Curriculum, AP, IBDP	Kowloon Tong Church of the Chinese Christian and Missionary Alliance	2017
	Concordia International School (Concordia)	AP		1990
	Delia Memorial School (Glee Path) (DMSGP)	HKDSE, IBDP	Delia Group of Schools	1972
	Po Leung Kuk Choi Kai Yau School (CKY)	IGCSE, IBDP	Po Leung Kuk	2002
	Tsung Tsin Christian Academy (TTCA)	HKDSE, A-level		2004

== Southern District ==
Image	Name (Abbreviation)	Curriculum	Affiliation	Established
	Canadian International School of Hong Kong (CDNIS)	IBPYP/MYP/DP, Ontario Secondary School Diploma	Canadians in Hong Kong	1991
	Hong Kong International School (HKIS)	AP		1966
	Independent Schools Foundation Academy (ISF)	IBMYP/DP		2003
	Kennedy School (Kennedy)	IBPYP	English Schools Foundation	1961
	Singapore International School (SISHK)	IBDP	Ministry of Education (Singapore) Singaporeans in Hong Kong	1991
	South Island School (SIS)	IGCSE, IBMYP/DP/CP, BTEC Extended Diploma	English Schools Foundation	1977
	St Stephen's College (Hong Kong) (SSC)	HKDSE, IBDP		1903
	The Harbour School (THS)	AP		2007
	Victoria Shanghai Academy (VSA)	IBPYP/MYP/DP	Victoria Educational Organisation University of Shanghai Alumni Association	2004
	West Island School (WIS)	IGCSE, IBMYP/DP/CP, BTEC Extended Diploma	English Schools Foundation	1991

== Tai Po District ==
Image	Name (Abbreviation)	Curriculum	Affiliation	Established
	American School Hong Kong (ASHK)	Common Core (G1-10), IBDP (G11-12)	Esol Education Americans in Hong Kong	2016
	International College Hong Kong Hong Lok Yuen (ICHK HLY)	IBPYP	International College Hong Kong	1983
	Japanese International School (JIS)	IBPYP	Hong Kong Japanese School Limited Japanese people in Hong Kong	1997
	Malvern College Hong Kong (MCHK)	IBPYP/MYP/DP	Malvern College International Britons in Hong Kong	2018
	Norwegian International School (NIS)	International Early Years Curriculum, Biblical Foundations Curriculum (Kindergarten), International Primary Curriculum (Primary)	Norwegians in Hong Kong	1984

== Tsuen Wan District ==
Image	Name (Abbreviation)	Curriculum	Affiliation	Established
	Sear Rogers International School (SRIS)	IGCSE, A-level		1982

== Tuen Mun District ==
Image	Name (Abbreviation)	Curriculum	Affiliation	Established
	Harrow International School Hong Kong (HISHK)	IGCSE, A-level	Britons in Hong Kong	2012

== Wan Chai District ==
Image	Name (Abbreviation)	Curriculum	Affiliation	Established
	Bradbury School (Bradbury)	IBPYP	English Schools Foundation	1975
	Dalton School Hong Kong (DSHK)	Dalton Plan	Dalton Foundation	2017
	Hong Kong Japanese School (HKJS)	Japanese Curriculum	Hong Kong Japanese School Limited Japanese people in Hong Kong	1966
	St. Paul's Convent School (SPCS)	HKDSE, A-level		1854

== Wong Tai Sin District ==
Image	Name (Abbreviation)	Curriculum	Affiliation	Established
	International Christian Quality Music Secondary and Primary School (ICQM)	HKDSE, music education	Hong Kong International Institute of Music	2003

== Yau Tsim Mong District ==
Image	Name (Abbreviation)	Curriculum	Affiliation	Established
	Diocesan Boys' School (DBS)	HKDSE, IBDP	Hong Kong Sheng Kung Hui	1869
	Diocesan Girls' School (DGS)	HKDSE, A-level	Hong Kong Sheng Kung Hui	1860

== Yuen Long District ==
Image	Name (Abbreviation)	Curriculum	Affiliation	Established
	ELCHK Lutheran Academy (LUAC)	HKDSE, IBDP	Evangelical Lutheran Church of Hong Kong	2010
	HKFYG Lee Shau Kee College (HLC)	HKDSE, A-level	Hong Kong Federation of Youth Groups	2006

== Defunct schools ==
Image	Name (Abbreviation)	Curriculum	Affiliation	Established	Closed	Now
	Kowloon British School (KBS)	British	Britons in Hong Kong	1902	1940	King George V School, Hong Kong
	St George's School, Hong Kong (SGS)	British	Britons in Hong Kong	1955	1996	Australian International School Hong Kong

== See also ==
- List of international schools
  - List of international schools in China
- List of schools in Hong Kong
  - List of primary schools in Hong Kong
  - List of secondary schools in Hong Kong
  - List of English Schools Foundation schools
