= List of schools in Sai Kung District =

This is a list of schools in Sai Kung District, Hong Kong.

== Secondary schools ==
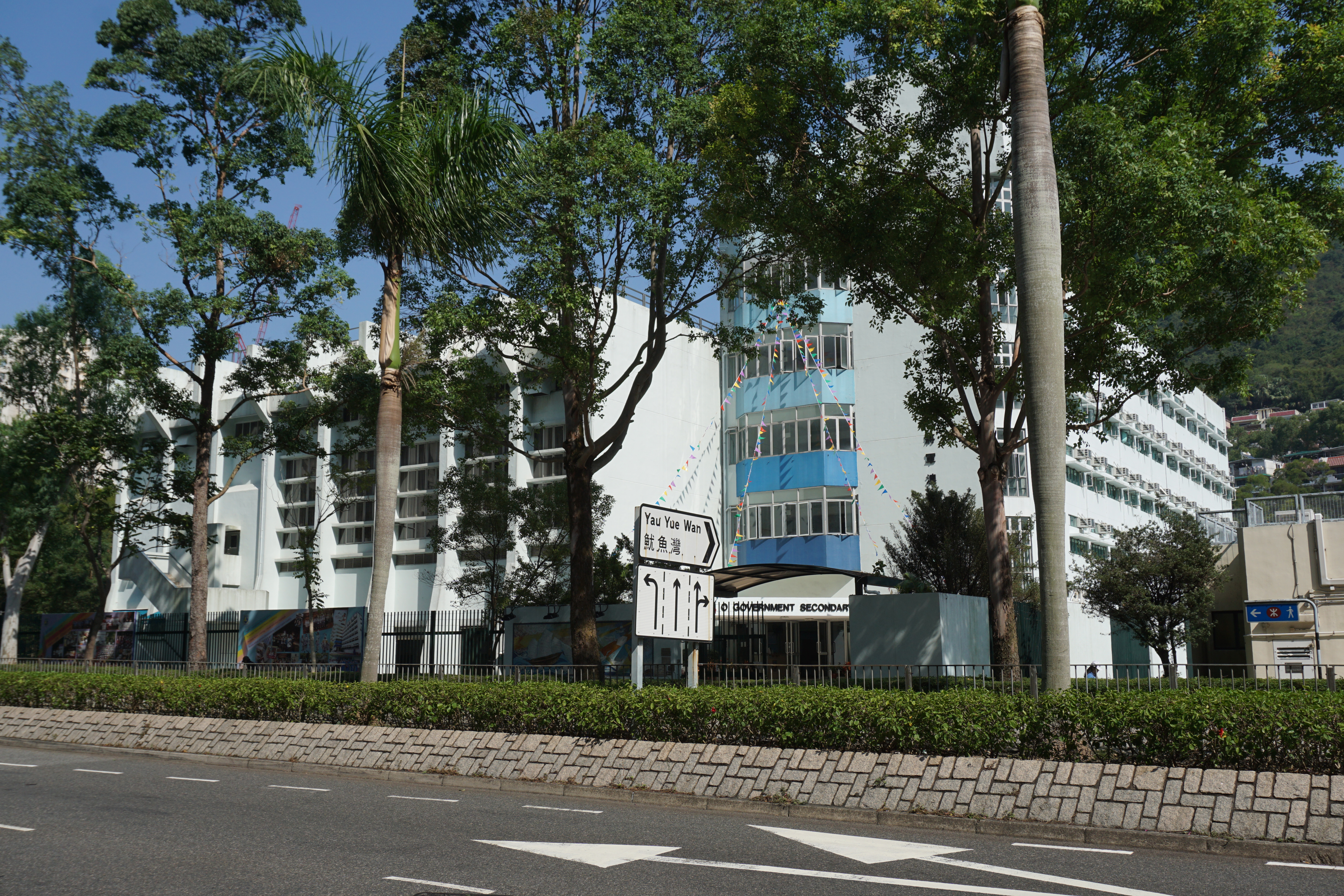
Tseung Kwan O Government Secondary School (將軍澳官立中學)

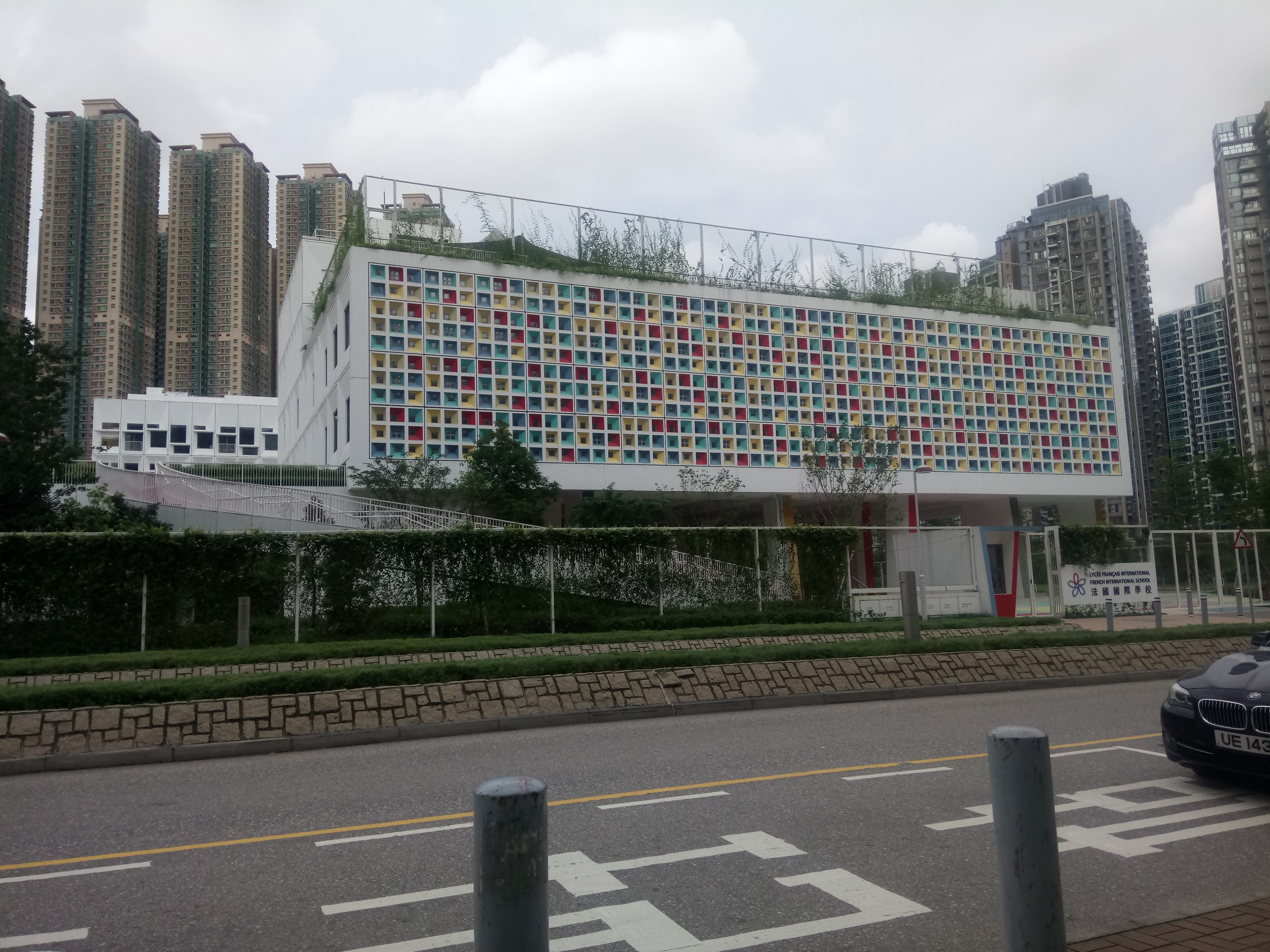
French International School of Hong Kong Tseung Wan O Campus

Government

- Tseung Kwan O Government Secondary School (將軍澳官立中學)

Aided

- C&MA Sun Kei Secondary School (基督教宣道會宣基中學)
- Carmel Divine Grace Foundation Secondary School (迦密主恩中學)
- Catholic Ming Yuen Secondary School (天主教鳴遠中學)
- Cheng Chek Chee Secondary School of Sai Kung & Hang Hau District, N.T. (新界西貢坑口區鄭植之中學)
- HHCKLA Buddhist Ching Kok Secondary School (香海正覺蓮社佛教正覺中學)
- HK and Macau Lu Ch Queen Maud Secondary School (港澳信義會慕德中學)
- HKTA The Yuan Yuen Institute No. 3 Secondary School (香港道教聯合會圓玄學院第三中學)
- King Ling College (景嶺書院)
- MKMCF Ma Chan Duen Hey Memorial College (馬錦明慈善基金馬陳端喜紀念中學)
- PLK Ho Yuk Ching (1984) College (保良局甲子何玉清中學)
- Po Kok Secondary School (寶覺中學)
- POH 80th Anniversary Tang Ying Hei College (博愛醫院八十週年鄧英喜中學)
- Sai Kung Sun Tsun Catholic School (Secondary Section) (西貢崇真天主教學校（中學部）)
- STFA Cheng Yu Tung Secondary School (順德聯誼總會鄭裕彤中學)
- TWGH Lui Yun Choy Memorial College (東華三院呂潤財紀念中學))
- Wellington Educational Organisation Chang Pui Choy Memorial Secondary School (威靈頓教育機構張沛松紀念中學)
- YCH Lan Chi Pat Memorial Secondary School (仁濟醫院靚次伯紀念中學)
- YCH Wong Sha San Secondary School (仁濟醫院王華湘中學)

Direct Subsidy Scheme

- Creative Secondary School (啓思中學)
- Evangel College
- G. T. (Ellen Yeung) College (優才（楊殷有娣）書院)
- Heung To Sec School (將軍澳香島中學)
- Hong Kong Chinese Christian Churches Union Logos Academy (香港華人基督教聯會真道書院)
- Man Kwan Qualied College (萬鈞匯知中學)
- Po Leung Kuk Laws Foundation College (保良局羅氏基金中學)

Private

- French International School of Hong Kong Tseung Kwan O Campus
- Hong Kong Academy (香港學堂國際學校)
- Hong Kong Adventist Academy (香港復臨學校)
- MKMCF Ma Chan Duen Hey Memorial Evening College (馬錦明慈善基金馬陳端喜紀念夜校)
- Rudolf Steiner Education Foundation Hong Kong Maria College (香港華德福教育基金會瑪利亞書院)

== Primary schools ==
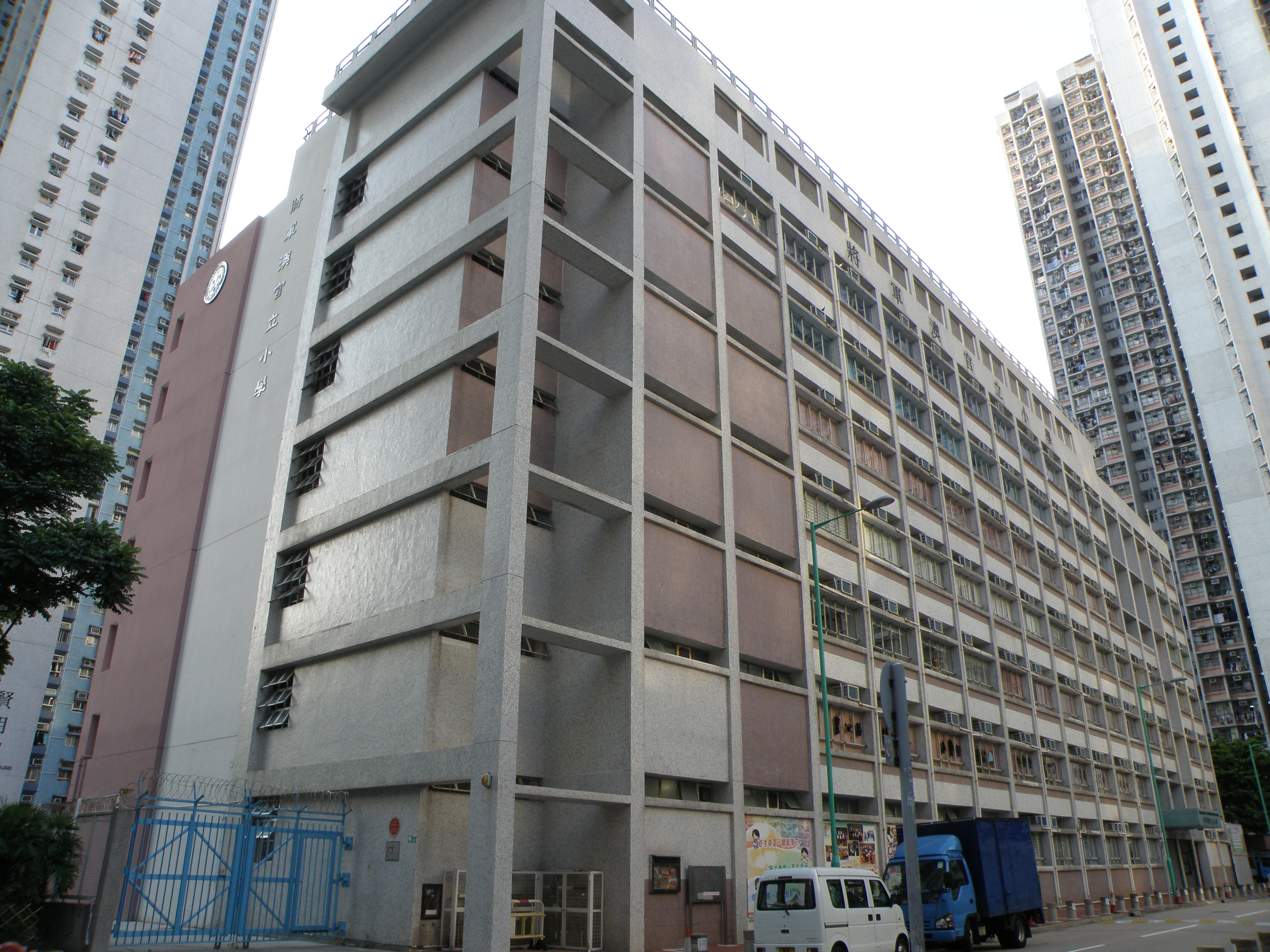
Tseung Kwan O Government Primary School (將軍澳官立小學)

Government

- Tseung Kwan O Government Primary School (將軍澳官立小學)

Aided

- Assembly of God Leung Sing Tak Primary School (基督教神召會梁省德小學)
- Chi Lin Buddhist Primary School (佛教志蓮小學)
- CHR & Missionary Alliance Sun Kei Primary School (基督教宣道會宣基小學)
- HHCKLA Buddhist Wong Cho Sum School (香海正覺蓮社佛教黃藻森學校)
- HK & Macau Lutheran Church Ming Tao Primary School (港澳信義會明道小學)
- HK & Macau Lutheran Church Primary School (港澳信義會小學)
- King Lam Catholic Primary School (景林天主教小學)
- Lok Sin Tong Lau Tak Primary School (樂善堂劉德學校)
- PLK Fung Ching Memorial Primary School (保良局馮晴紀念小學)
- PLK Wong Wing Shu Primary School (保良局黃永樹小學)
- Pok Oi Hospital Chan Kwok Wai Primary School (博愛醫院陳國威小學)
- S.K.H. Tseung Kwan O Kei Tak Primary School (聖公會將軍澳基德小學)
- Sai Kung Central Lee Siu Yam Memorial School (西貢中心李少欽紀念學校)
- Sai Kung Sung Tsun Catholic School (Primary Section (西貢崇真天主教學校（小學部）)
- St Andrew's Catholic Primary School (天主教聖安德肋小學)
- STFA Leung Kit Wah Primary School (順德聯誼總會梁潔華小學)
- Tseung Kwan O Catholic Primary School (將軍澳天主教小學)
- Tseung Kwan O Methodist Primary School (將軍澳循道衛理小學)
- TWGH Wong Yee Jar Jat Memorial Primary School (東華三院王余家潔紀念小學)
- Yan Oi Tong Tin Ka Ping Primary School (仁愛堂田家炳小學)
- YCH Chan Iu Seng Primary School (仁濟醫院陳耀星小學)

Direct Subsidy Scheme

- Evangel College (播道書院)
- G. T. (Ellen Yeung) College (優才（楊殷有娣）書院)
- Hong Kong Chinese Christian Churches Union Logos Academy (香港華人基督教聯會真道書院)
- PLK Luk Hing Too Primary School (保良局陸慶濤小學)

English Schools Foundation

- Clearwater Bay School

Private

- Forest House Waldorf School (樹宏學校)
- French International School of Hong Kong Tseung Kwan O Campus
- Hong Kong Academy
- Hong Kong Adventist Academy (香港復臨學校)
- Invictus School
- Shrewsbury International School Hong Kong (思貝禮國際學校)

== Special schools ==
Aided

- Haven of Hope Sunnyside School (靈實恩光學校)
- Hong Chi Morninghill School, Tsui Lam (匡智翠林晨崗學校)
- Hong Kong Red Cross Hospital Schools Tseung Kwan O Hospital (香港紅十字會醫院學校)
- Tseung Kwan O Pui Chi School (將軍澳培智學校)
