= Junior Writers Awards =

- Location: Hong Kong
- Country: Hong Kong
- First award: 2014
- Website: www.jwya.org

The Junior Writer Awards (JWA) is educational charitable community outreach initiative and an English literacy writing competition for secondary school students based in Hong Kong and Macau. It was founded in 2014 by Norton House Education, and organised jointly with Upper House Academy in Macau, Education Bureau of Hong Kong, British Council, University of Hong Kong, Cambridge University, Oxford University Press, Eslite Bookstore and South China Morning Post, as a philanthropic educational initiative to raise English literacy levels, thinking skills and social awareness of secondary students in Hong Kong and Macau.

== Winners ==
Past winners include:

=== Junior Group ===
Age Group: 11–13 years

Year	Essay Topic
2014	What is my role in society?

Year	Champion		1st Runner Up		2nd Runner Up	
Year	Name of Contestant	Representing School	Name of Contestant	Representing School	Name of Contestant	Representing School
2014	Lok Chi Yeung	International Christian School (Hong Kong)	Liam Fung	Chinese International School	Olivia Ko	St. Paul's Co-educational College

=== Intermediate Group ===
Age Group: 14–16 years

Year	Essay Topic
2014	What does Rule of Law have to do with me?

Year	Champion		1st Runner Up		2nd Runner Up	
Year	Name of Contestant	Representing School	Name of Contestant	Representing School	Name of Contestant	Representing School
2014	Serena Chan	St. Paul's Co-educational College	Edward Mak	King George V School (Hong Kong)	Gregory Wong	La Salle College

=== Advanced Group ===
Age Group: 16+ years

Year	Essay Topic
2014	If I could go back in time to any period of history, when would it be and why?

Year	Champion		1st Runner Up		2nd Runner Up	
Year	Name of Contestant	Representing School	Name of Contestant	Representing School	Name of Contestant	Representing School
2014	Reo Shoshi	French International School	Victoria Cherrington	West Island School	Charlotte Lam	St. Stephen's Girls' College

=== Greatest Pen Winner ===
Year	Name of Contestant	Representing School
2014	Lok Chi Yeung	International Christian School (Hong Kong)

=== Greatest Potential ===
Year	Name of Contestant	Representing School
2014	Fong Man Hong Maxwell	Pui Ching Middle School (Macau)

=== Most Inspirational ===
Year	Name of Contestant	Representing School
2014	Yeung Chak Sze	Wong Kam Fai Secondary & Primary School

=== Most Innovative ===
Year	Name of Contestant	Representing School
2014	Ronaq Mathur	Island School

=== Scholastic Writer ===
Year	Name of Contestant	Representing School
2014	Adrian Au	Diocesan Boys' School

=== Most Promising Young Writer ===
Year	Name of Contestant	Representing School
2014	Lui Hei Ching Tiffany	Diocesan Girls' School
