= Norton House Education =

House Academic Development
Location
- 22/F, Leighton Centre, Causeway Bay, Hong Kong (Headquarter)

Information
- Established: 2009
- Website: www.nh.edu.hk
- Facebook: www.facebook.com/nortonhousehk

House Academic Development (a.k.a. Norton House Academic & Intellectual Development) is a private University Admission Planning Strategist, Content Provider for private wealth families and clubs based in Hong Kong, the UK, South-east Asia, Russia, Japan, Macau and China, specialising in UK university admissions management and consulting.

House Academic Development has collaborated with various educational institutions, global businesses and organisations by providing them with academic consultations and related intellectual advisory services for the purpose of university admissions, such as the Hong Kong Jockey Club, Eslite Bookstore, Cambridge University, The University of Hong Kong, UBS, Credit Suisse, Standard Chartered, KPMG, PricewaterhouseCoopers, Hong Kong Economic Times, Oxford University Press and Hysan Development, etc.

House Academic Development is also the founding organiser and donor of the largest secondary-level educational community outreach and academic writing award competition in Hong Kong, Shenzhen and Macau, the Junior Writers Awards, in collaboration with the South China Morning Post, supported by the Education Bureau of Hong Kong, British Council, Linklaters and SJM Holdings.

== Academic team ==
Founded and led by Vickie Liu Yeuk Yee, a seasoned educator, House Academic Development and its team of university admission strategists, who were Oxbridge and Russell Group graduates and researchers, have supported over 5,000 students in HK, Macau, China, Japan, Russia and the UK, in the area of global university admissions.
