= St George's School, Hong Kong =

Former school in Hong Kong

St. George's School in Hong Kong opened in 1955 to serve the educational needs of the growing population of British armed forces personnel and civil servants in the colony. It closed in 1996 in preparation for the 1997 handover of Hong Kong. A new school, the Australian International School Hong Kong, now sits partly on the Norfolk Road site vacated by the St. George's closure.

The school operated a house system. It consisted of Balmoral, Osbourne, Sandringham and Windsor houses. There was originally a Buckingham house as well. Towards the last years of the school's existence, as the number of pupils dropped, Osbourne and Windsor houses were merged, the name Osbourne was kept with the red colour of Windsor.

- It was originally located at Minden Barracks, Kowloon before being moved to its more well known address in Norfolk Road, Kowloon, Hong Kong (BFPO1).
- The school has a very active alumni website.

The final campus was in Kowloon Tong. The Hong Kong Government was scheduled to take over the school facility circa 1995. The English Schools Foundation (ESF) asked the Education and Manpower Department of Hong Kong to allow the ESF to open its own facilities in the St George's facility.
