= Kingston International School =

- 京斯敦國際學校
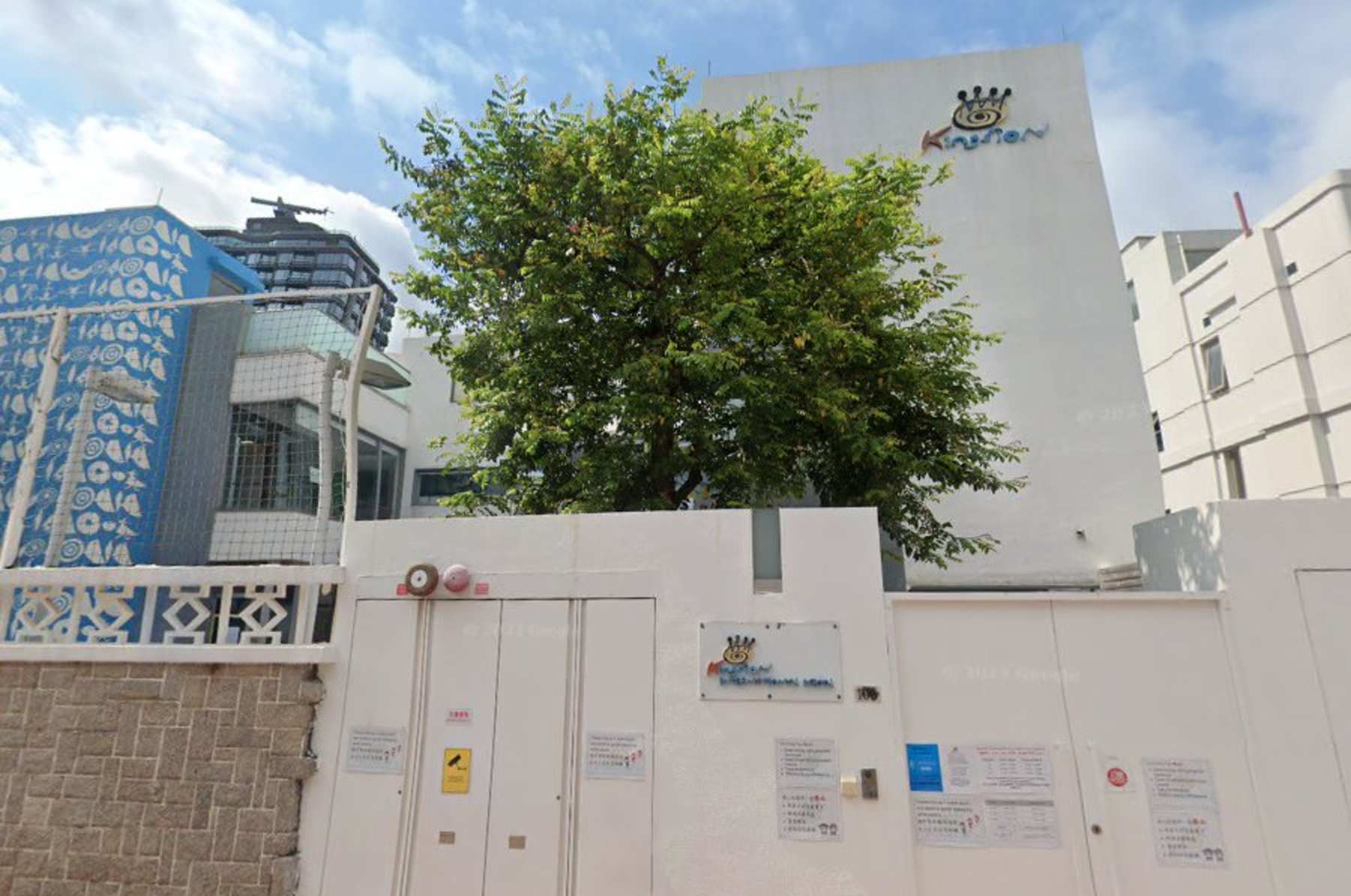
- Upper Primary Building

Location
- 105 Waterloo Rd, Kowloon Tong; Kowloon; Hong Kong
- Coordinates: 22.32748°N 114.17807°E

Information
- School type: Bilingual, Co-educational, International, Day, Private
- Founded: 1996
- Head Principal: Eliza Wong
- Lower Primary Principal: Emily Flach
- Upper Primary Principal: John Harper
- Vice Principal: Dr Fenwick Tong
- Years offered: K1 - Y6
- Age range: 1-11
- Average class size: 15-25
- Language: English, Mandarin (Traditional Characters)
- Houses: Green, Blue, Yellow, Red

Kingston International School (short: KIS, Chinese: 京斯敦國際學校) is a co-educational bilingual international school founded in 1996, located in Kowloon Tong, Hong Kong. The school comprises three main buildings: two primary school campuses, and a kindergarten (Kingston International Kindergarten).

As of 2024, the school has around 260 total students and its Head Principal is Eliza Wong.

== Curriculum ==
The school adopts the International Baccalaureate curriculum, with classes starting from K1 (Nursery) up to Primary 6. As the first school to provide the IBPYP programme in Hong Kong, it has been offering this child-centred inquiry approach for more than 20 years. Kingston provides a gate-way to secondary school learning via their partnership with International College Hong Kong (ICHK); graduates of Kingston International School are promised a guaranteed spot in ICHK. Kingston International School teaches in both English and Putonghua (Chinese).

== School uniform ==
The school's uniform consists of two forms for primary students, Winter and Summer. The summer uniform consists of a white buttoned collar shirt, short pants with a green and yellow grid pattern, and a sports uniform with a short-sleeved T-shirt based on the color of the student's house. The winter uniform consists of a blue long-sleeved buttoned collar shirt, long dark-gray pants, and a long-sleeved T-shirt based on the color of the student's house.

== House system ==
The school's houses are Green, Blue, Yellow, and Red.
