= Shek Mun =

District in Sha Tin City, Hong Kong

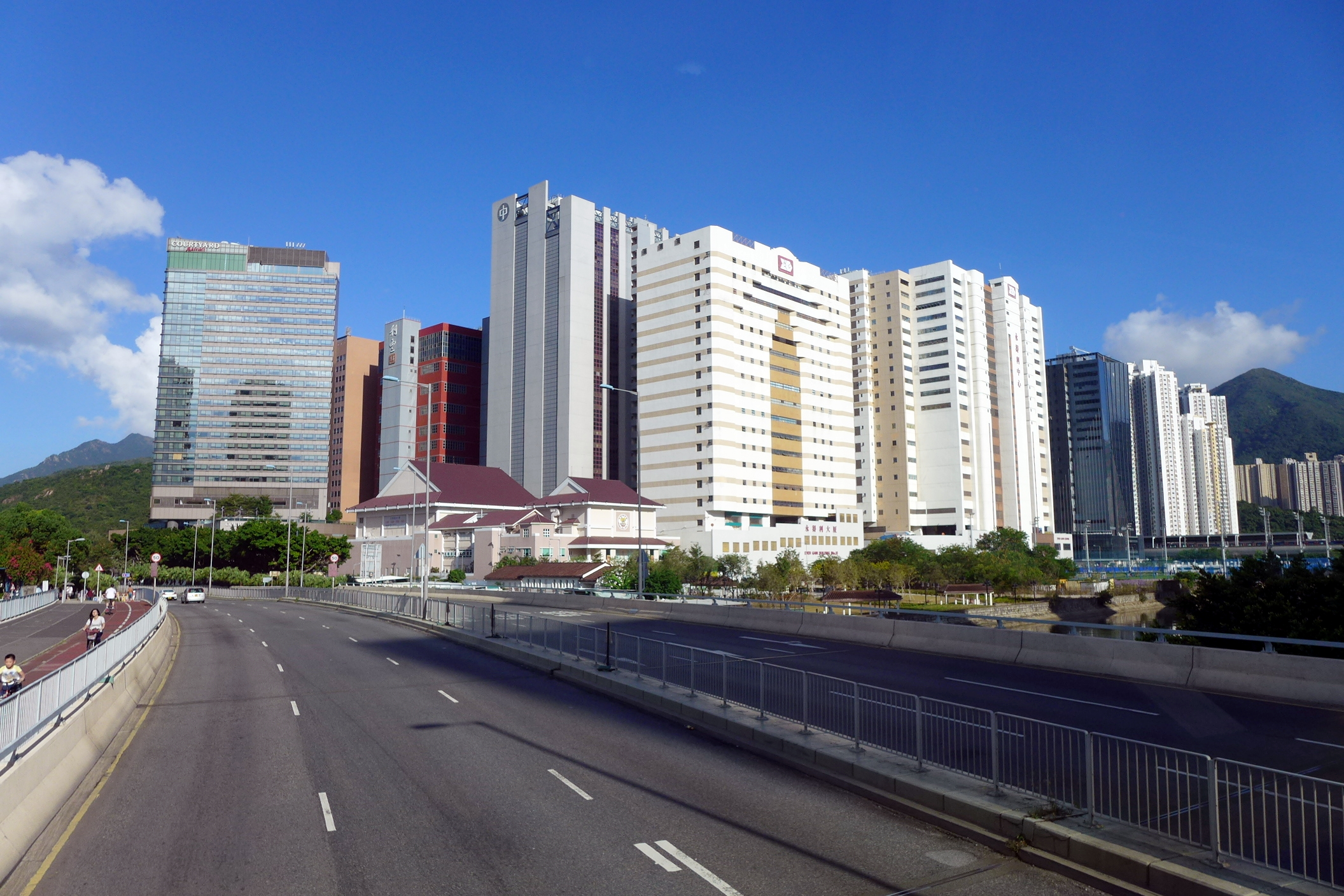
- View of Shek Mun Central Business District from the bridge leading to City One.
- Traditional Chinese: 石門
- Simplified Chinese: 石门
- Literal meaning: Stone Gate
Transcriptions
Standard Mandarin
- Hanyu Pinyin: Shímén
Yue: Cantonese
- Jyutping: sek6 mun4
- IPA: sɛk2 mun35

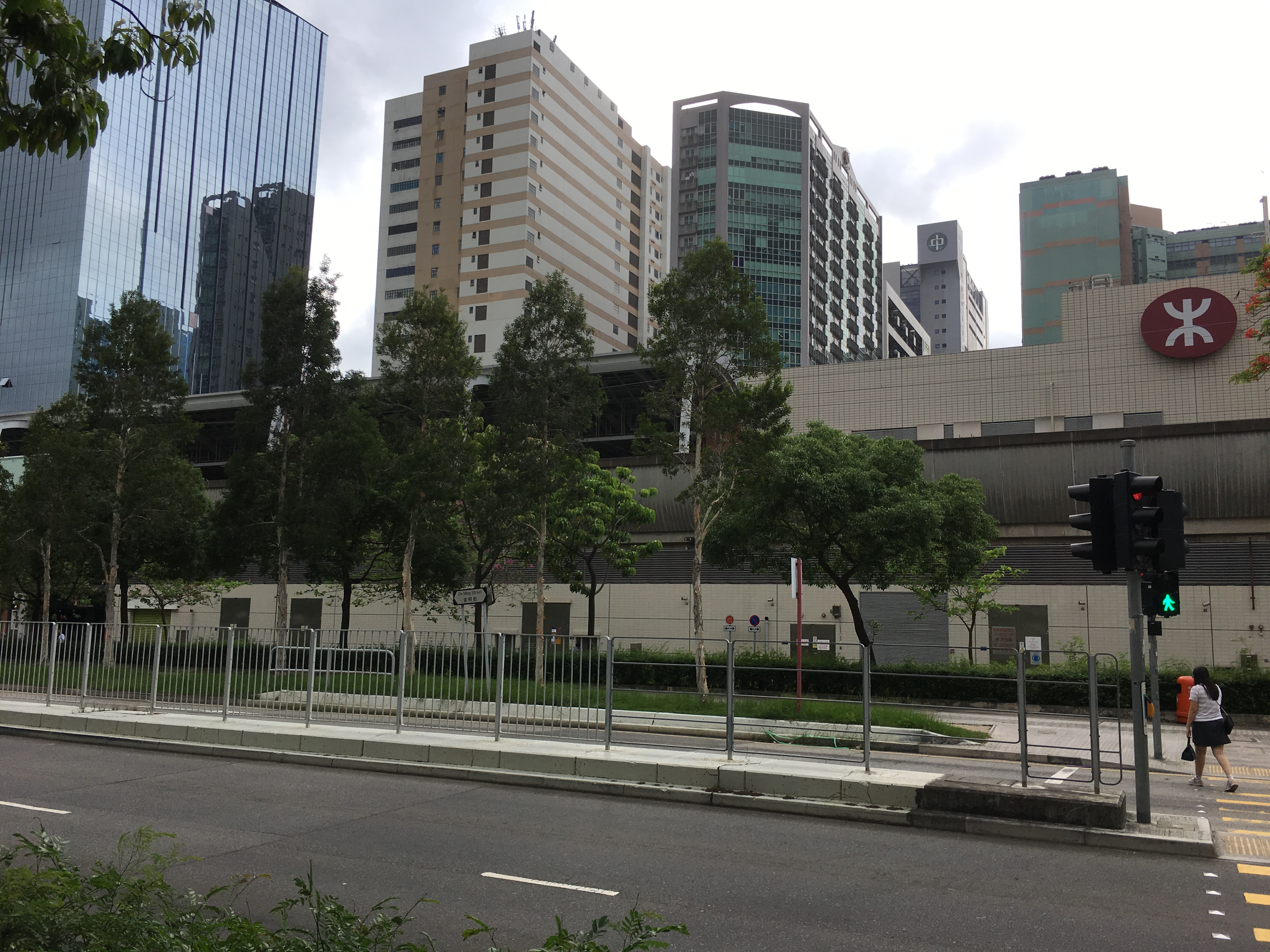
Shek Mun Station exterior in 2017

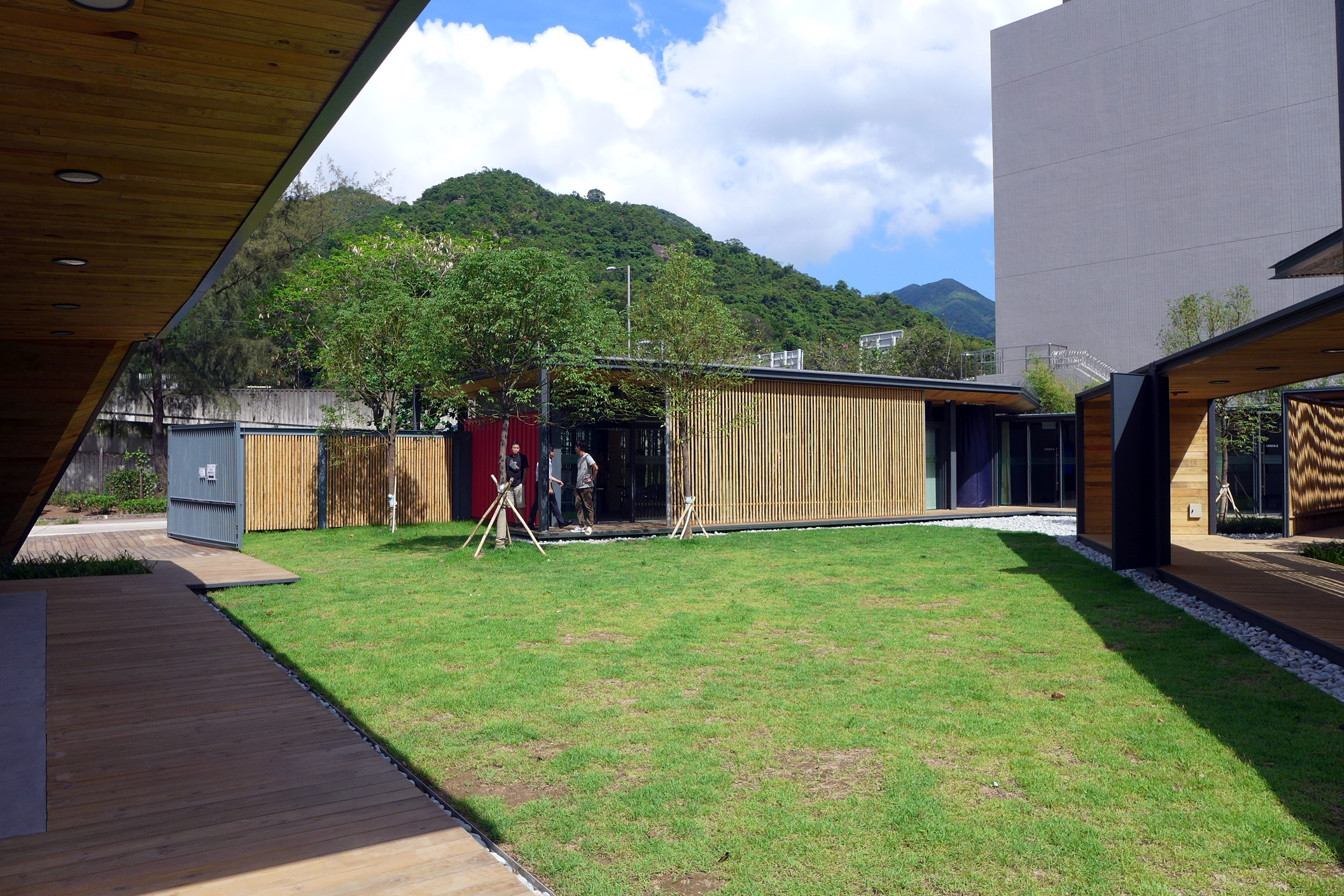
Sha Tin Community Green Station.

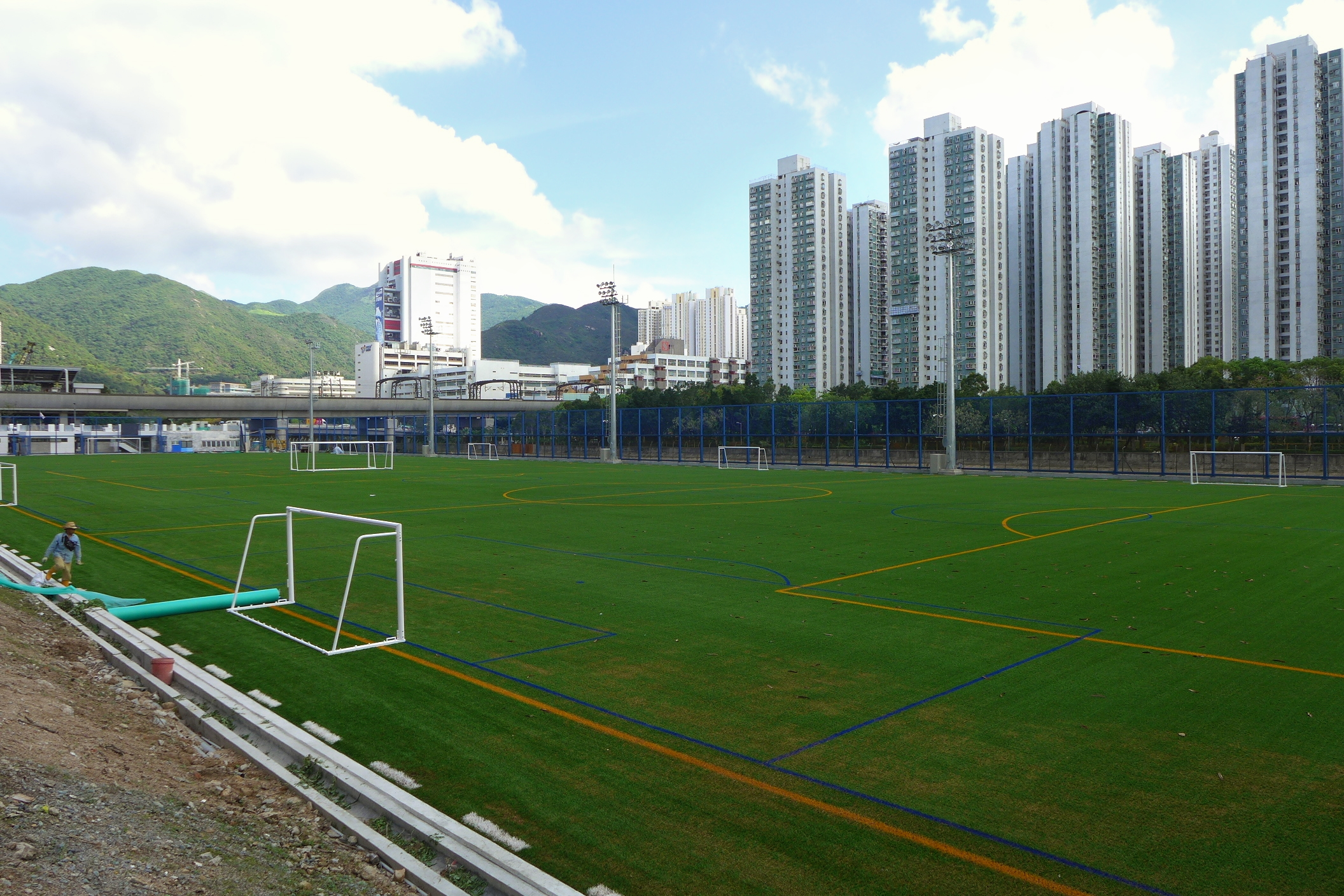
The Jockey Club Kitchee Centre, a football training field managed by Kitchee Sports Club.

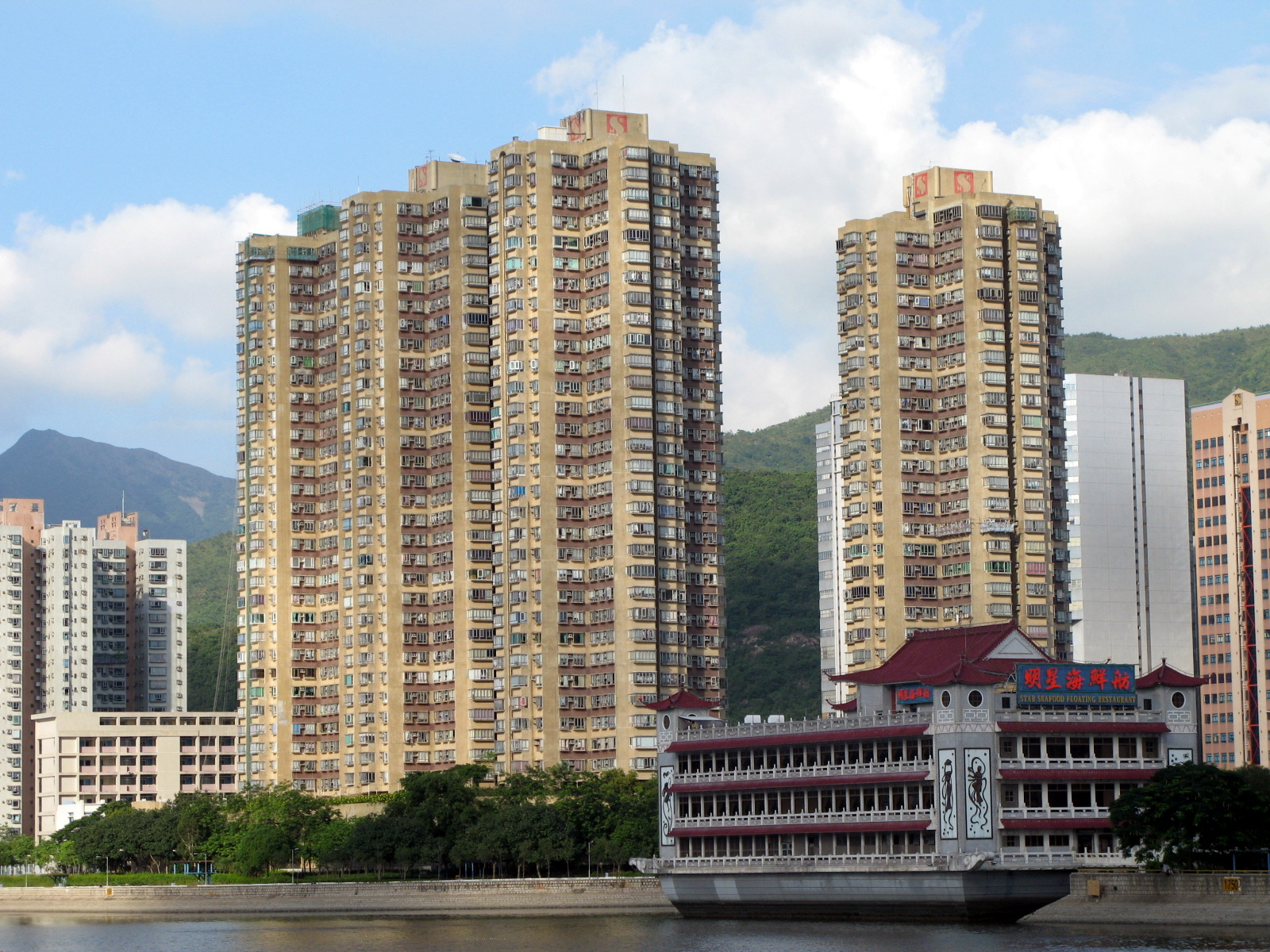
The Ravana Garden housing estate in Shek Mun, and the Star Seafood Floating Restaurant, viewed across the Shing Mun River.

Shek Mun (Chinese: 石門) is an industrial and financial area in Sha Tin, New Territories of Hong Kong.

Shek Mun lies just east of the Shing Mun River, and northeast of the City One apartment and shopping complex.

== Housing ==
Shek Mun Estate is a public housing estate in Shek Mun, completed in 2009.

Yu Tak Court is a housing estate in Shek Mun, completed in 2022.

Private housing estates in Shek Mun includes: Ravana Garden (濱景花園), Garden Vista(翠湖花園) and Pictorial Garden (碧濤花園).

== Other features ==
Several educational facilities are located in Shek Mun including International Christian School and the Hong Kong Baptist University Affiliated School Wong Kam Fai Secondary and Primary School. A branch of the Hong Kong Baptist University, as well as local public elementary and secondary schools which are run by the university. Shek Mun is also home to some light industry and manufacturing.

Shek Mun is the location of the Jockey Club Kitchee Centre, which is dedicated to youth football development

== Transport ==
=== MTR ===
Shek Mun is served by the Shek Mun station on the Tuen Ma line of the MTR rapid transit railway system.

=== Bus ===
There are 2 major bus termini in Shek Mun:

- Shek Mun Estate (碩門邨巴士總站)
- Shek Mun (On Ming Street) (石門(安明街)巴士總站)

== Education ==
Shek Mun is in Primary One Admission (POA) School Net 91. Within the school net are multiple aided schools (operated independently but funded with government money); no government schools are in this net.
