= Jockey Club Kitchee Centre =

Football training ground in Hong Kong

Coordinates: 22.3880°N 114.2066°E

- Jockey Club Kitchee Centre
- Kitchee Centre 、Shek Mun Centre、JCKC
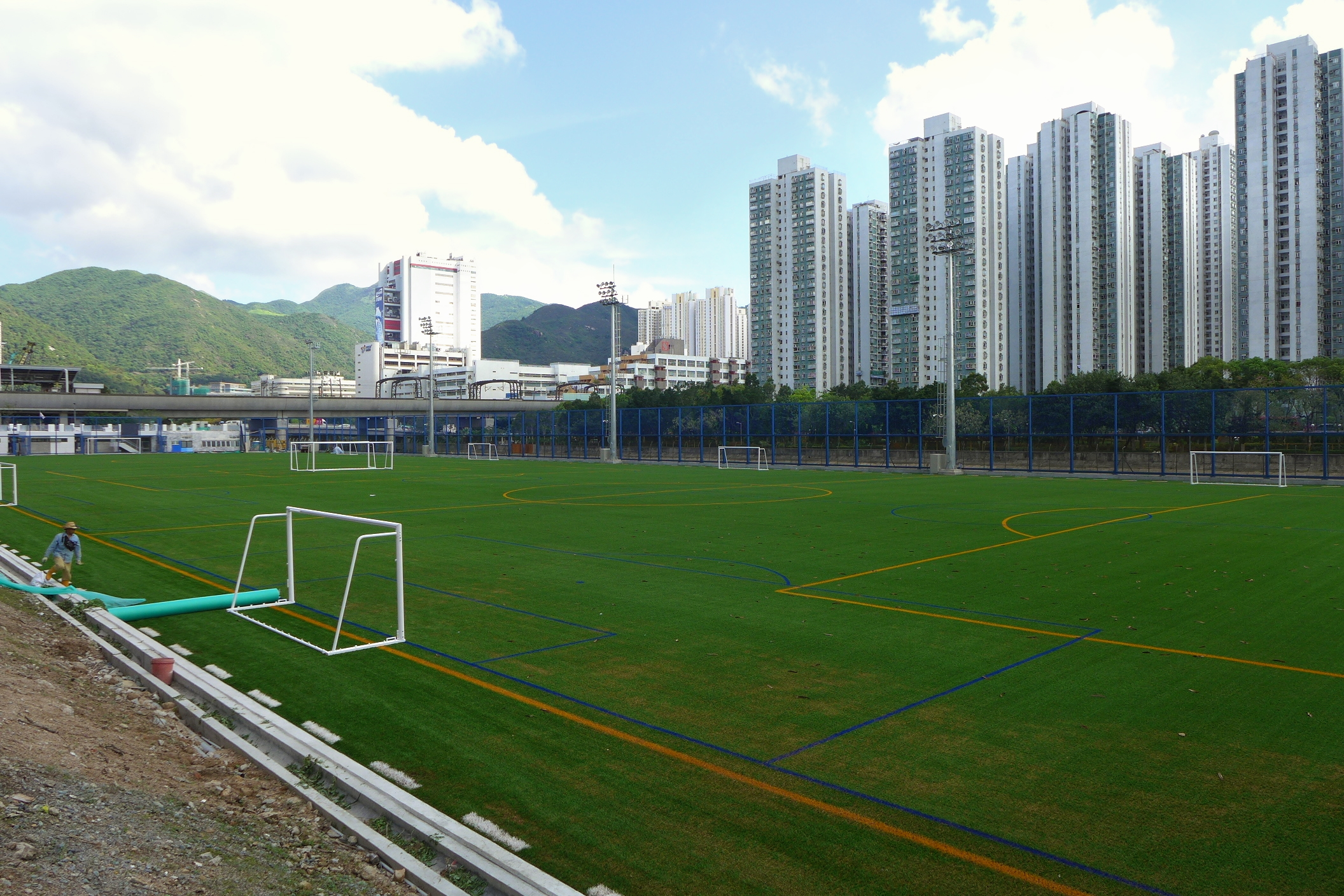
- Jockey Club Kitchee Centre in May 2015
- Interactive map of Jockey Club Kitchee Centre
- Location: Sha Tin District Shek Mun 23 On Muk Street
- Owner: Kitchee SC
- Operator: Kitchee SC
- Surface: artificial turf

Construction
- Built: May 2014
- Opened: 9 September 2015

Tenants
- Kitchee; Hong Kong national football team

The Jockey Club Kitchee Centre is the training ground of Kitchee, a Hong Kong Premier League football club. It is located in Shek Mun, Sha Tin, New Territories, Hong Kong. The facility was officially opened on 9 September 2015. It was funded by the Hong Kong Jockey Club and is named in recognition of its support.

Covering 15,050 square metres, the centre serves as the training base of Kitchee and the Kitchee Academy. It also accommodates youth football training programmes for children aged 6 to 12 and provides facilities for the Professional Football Development Scheme operated by Tung Chi Ying Memorial Secondary School, which is recognized by Hong Kong’s Education Bureau.

== History ==
=== Investment and construction ===
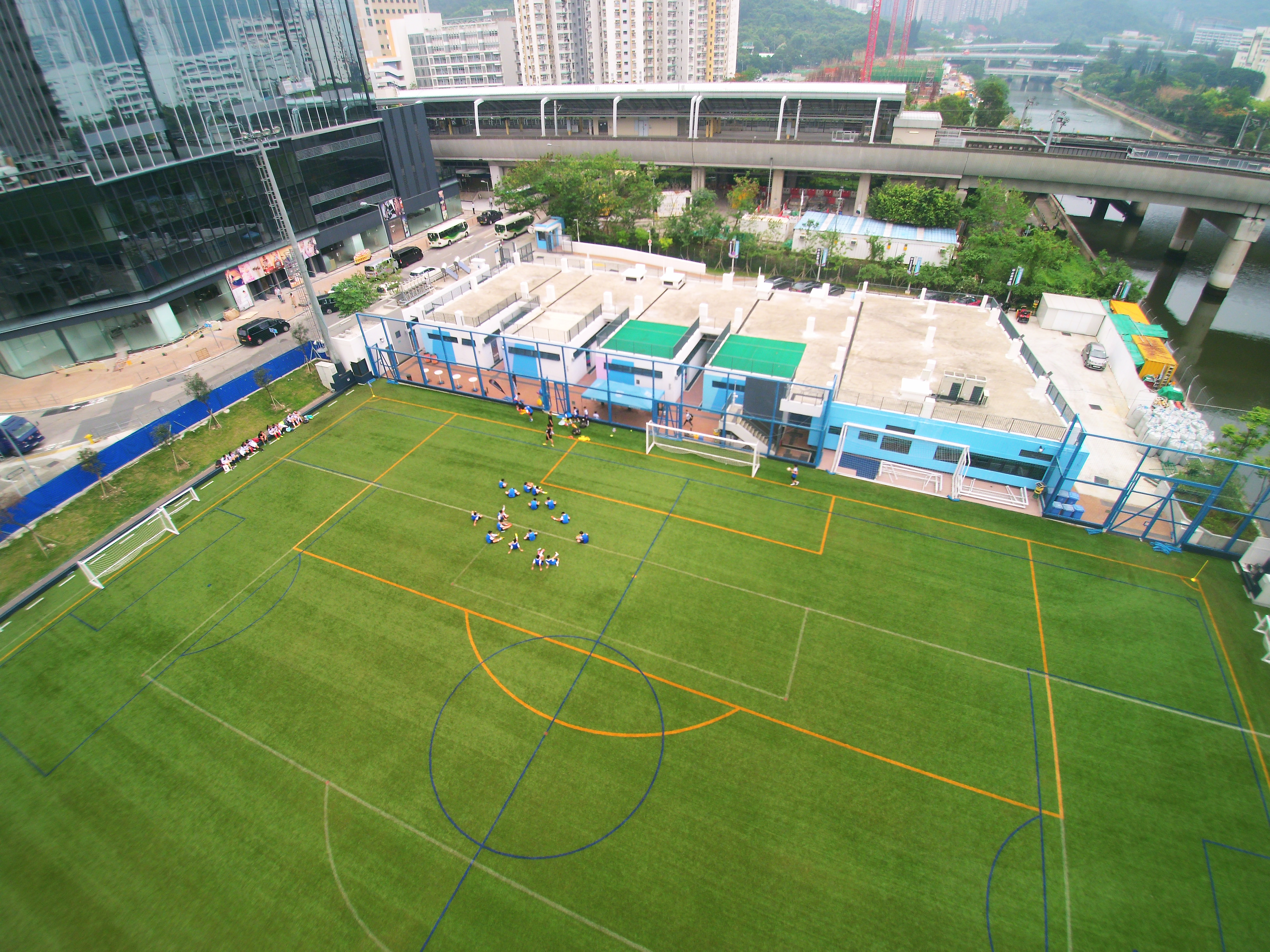
Overlooking the Jockey Club Kitchee Center

On 5 July 2012, So Cheung Tak, Executive Director of Charities of the Hong Kong Jockey Club, announced that more than HK$44 million would be donated through the Club’s Charities Trust to the Kitchee Foundation for the construction of the Jockey Club Kitchee Centre in Shek Mun, Sha Tin. The project was estimated to cost HK$49 million, while annual operating and management expenses of between HK$5 million and HK$7 million were to be borne by Kitchee Sports Club.

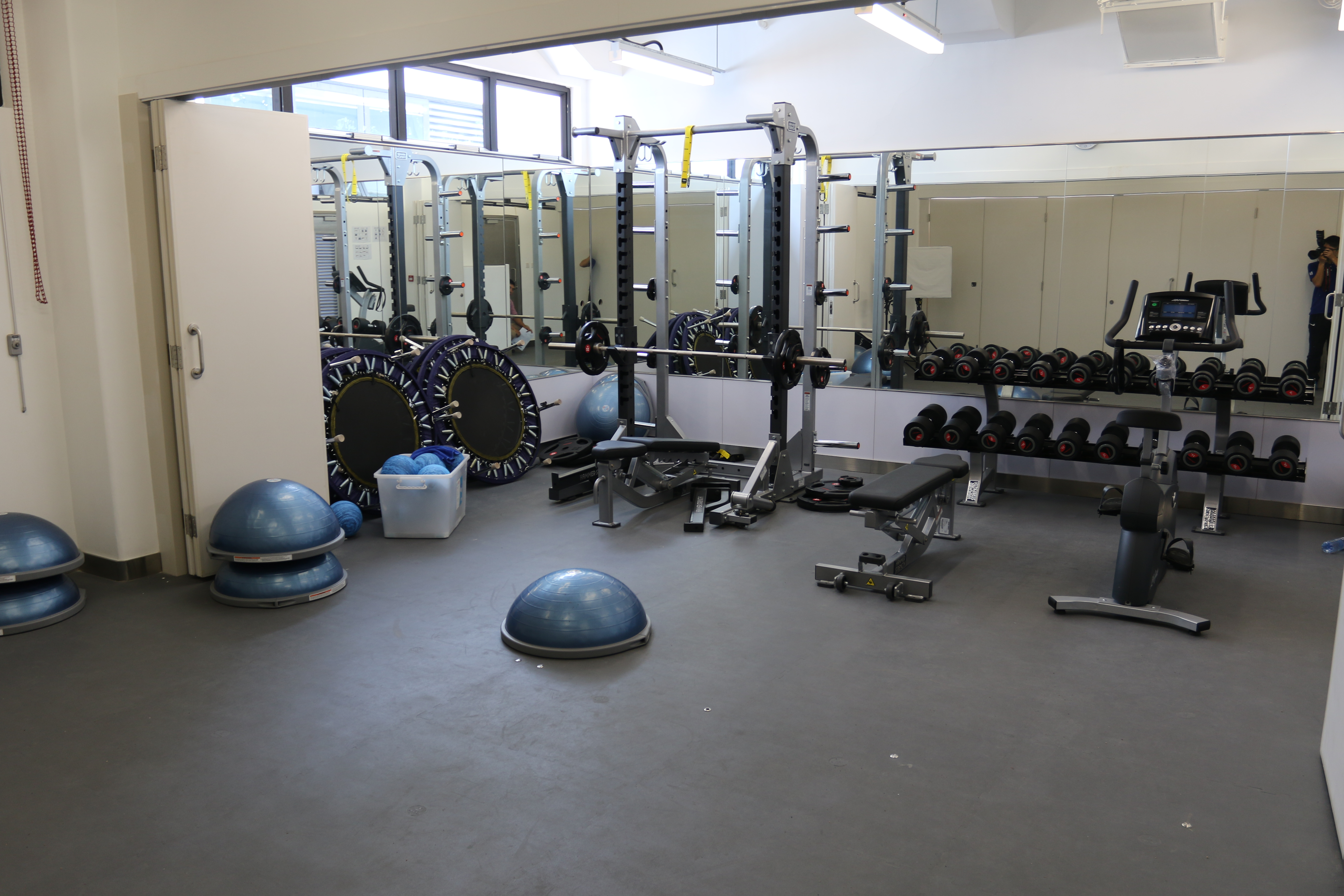
gym

On 16 October 2012, Tom Fox, then commercial director of Arsenal, presented Kitchee with a donation of HK$780,000 in support of the construction of the Jockey Club Kitchee Centre.

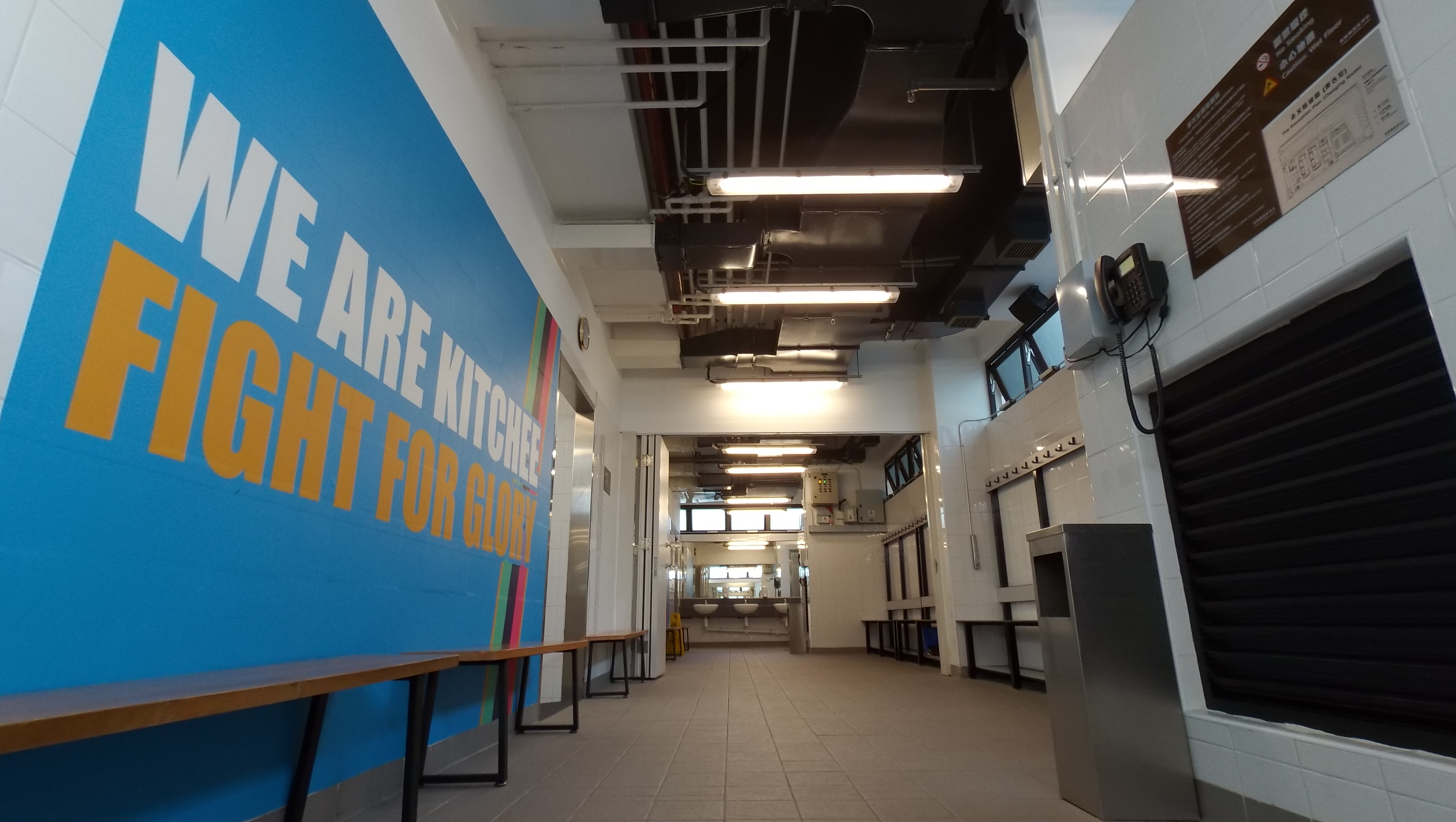
locker room

On 29 July 2013, Kitchee invited Manchester United, a club in the English Premier League , to visit Hong Kong to hold an exhibition match. Together with a charity gala held the previous evening and related fundraising activities, more than HK$2 million was raised for the centre.

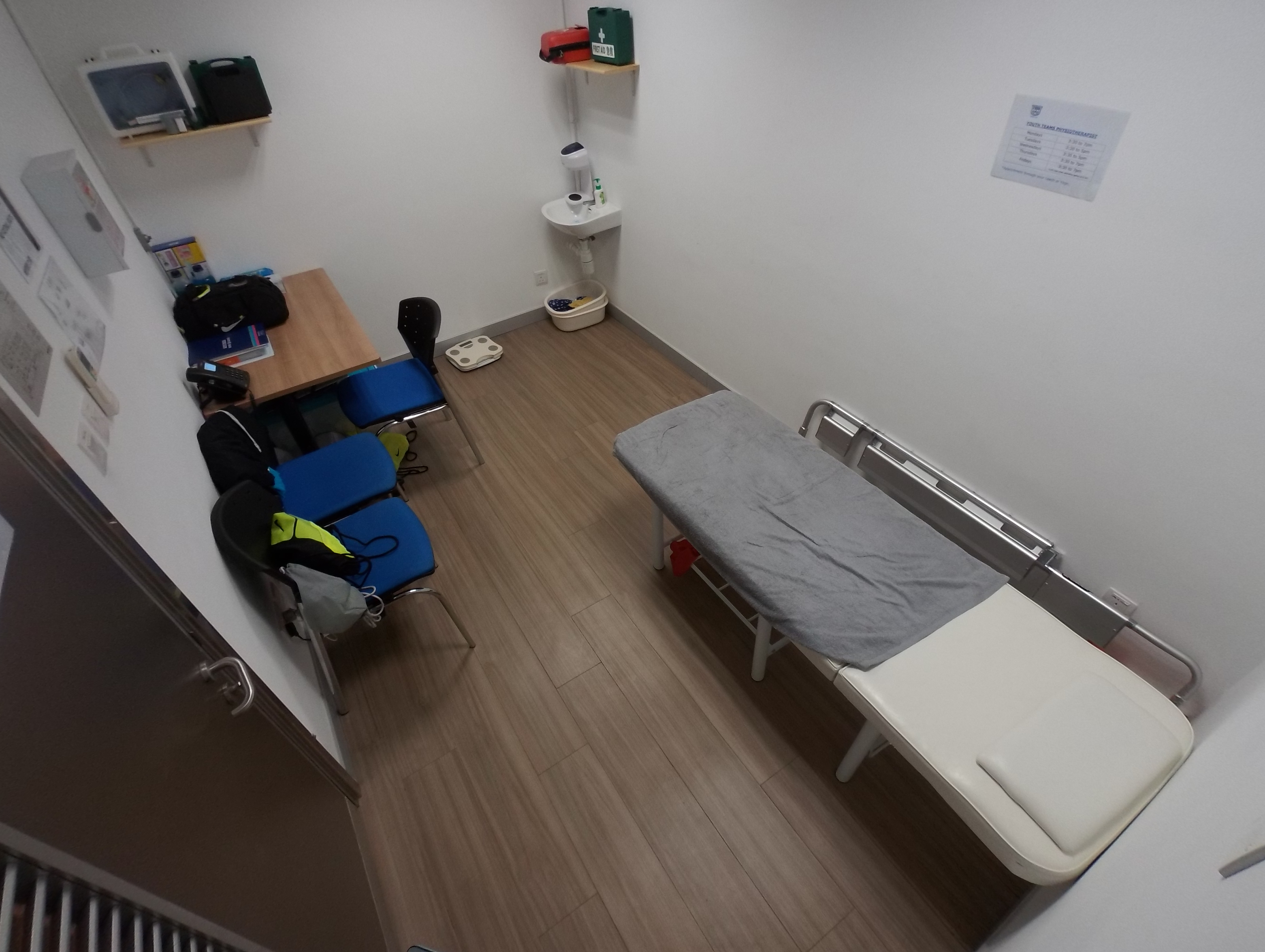
Medical Room

On 22 May 2014, a groundbreaking ceremony was held for the Jockey Club Kitchee Centre. Groundbreaking took place in 2014. Construction was expected to take approximately seven and a half months, with completion scheduled for December 2014. The total project cost had increased to HK$76 million.

=== Completed ===
The Jockey Club Kitchee Centre was completed and officially opened in July 2015.

== Typhoon Mangkhut ==
On 16 September 2018, Super Typhoon Mangkhut caused severe flooding at the Jockey Club Kitchee Centre, damaging its facilities and rendering the offices and pitches unusable. Kitchee temporarily relocated its operations to other venues from 17 September. Following nearly six months of repair works, including the replacement of the artificial turf, the centre reopened in mid-March 2019.

=== Expansion project ===
On 28 March 2018, Kitchee announced a HK$20 million expansion of the Jockey Club Kitchee Centre. The project involved the construction of a second storey and the establishment of the Kitchee–CUHK Sports Medicine Clinic.

On 12 July 2022, Kitchee stated that the expansion project was close to completion. The redevelopment included a nutrition restaurant and CUHK Medical Centre@Kitchee, a medical facility operated in partnership with the Chinese University of Hong Kong. Planned since 2017, the project was delayed by the COVID-19 pandemic. Located on the ground floor of the centre, the medical facility cost more than HK$12 million and was financed by Kitchee. Managed by the orthopaedic team of CUHK Hospital, it provides orthopaedic and physiotherapy services and includes facilities for physical assessment, rehabilitation and sports training.

== Facility ==
The centre comprises a football pitch complex and a service building complex. The pitch complex features a multi-purpose artificial turf field measuring 178 by 70 metres. The field may be configured as four seven-a-side pitches, two reduced-size eleven-a-side pitches, or a combination of one standard eleven-a-side pitch and one seven-a-side pitch.The facility has a capacity of approximately 120 users at one time.The service building complex consists of five buildings containing changing rooms, referee rooms, a parents’ lounge, medical rooms, offices, a convenience store and storage facilities.

The centre’s facilities are shared among youth development programmes, Kitchee’s first team and community users. Around one-third of the available training time is allocated to youth football activities, including programmes run by the the Kitchee Academy and the Professional Footballer Development Scheme of Tung Chi Ying Memorial Secondary School. A further one-third is reserved for first-team training, with the remainder available for public use by residents of Sha Tin.

The centre operates daily between 08:00 and 23:00. It offers 67 weekly booking sessions and records approximately 3,417 usage sessions annually.

== Dispute ==
In October 2016, the government proposed rezoning the site of the Jockey Club Kitchee Centre for subsidised housing development. As the centre had been in operation for only one year, the proposal drew opposition from the sports sector. The Planning Department subsequently released a revised Outline Zoning Plan that removed the site from the proposed rezoning scheme.However, the plan stated that the government would continue to identify alternative sites for the possible relocation of the football training centre.

== See also ==
- Hong Kong Jockey Club Football Association Football Training Centre
- Kitchee SC
