= American School Hong Kong =

Private international school in Hong Kong

American School Hong Kong (ASHK)
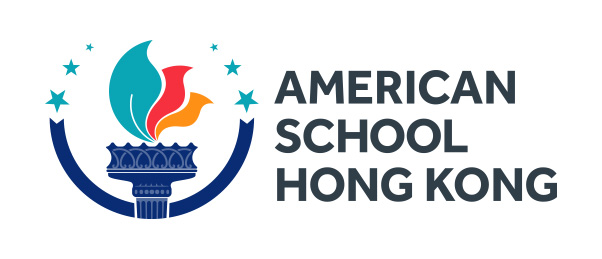

Location
- 6 Ma Chung Road, Tai Po, New Territories, Hong Kong
- Coordinates: 22°26′33″N 114°09′53″E

Information
- School type: Private School (international)
- Established: August 2016
- Founder: Esol Education
- Sister school: American International School in Abu Dhabi; Dunecrest American School, Dubai; Fairgreen International School, Dubai; American International School in Egypt - Main Campus; American International School in Egypt - West Campus; Cairo English School; American International School in Cyprus; Universal College - Aley
- School Principal: Christopher Coates (School Director), Amy Jackman (Elementary School Principal), Amanda Shepherd (Secondary School Principal)
- Grades: Kindergarten - Grade 12
- Gender: Co-educational
- Age range: 5 - 18
- Student to teacher ratio: ~12 students/1 teacher
- Language: English
- Hours in school day: 7 hours
- School fees: HK$146,000 to HK$220,000 / year
- Website: ashk.edu.hk

American School Hong Kong (ASHK, Chinese: 香港美國學校) is a co-educational American international school located at 6 Ma Chung Road, in Tai Po, New Territories, Hong Kong. It is owned and operated by Esol Education and enrolled its first students in August 2016. It offers classes in elementary, middle school and high school, through to Grade 12. Its Grade 9 class opens in August 2019, grade 10 opened in 2020 and grade 11 opened in 2021 with a new fifth floor.

== Curriculum ==
ASHK delivers an American education program, adapted for the local and international student body in Hong Kong.

From Kindergarten to Grade 10, ASHK's curriculum aligns with the US Common Core standards for Math and English, the Next Generation Science Standards (NGSS), and the American Education Reaches Out (AERO) guidelines for Social Studies. For students in grades 11 and 12, ASHK offers the International Baccalaureate (IB) Diploma Programme (DP).

=== STEAM Program ===
STEAM lessons are based on the Next Generation Science Standards and use the 5E Model (Engage, Explore, Explain, Elaborate, and Evaluate) along with the Engineering Design Process (Ask, Imagine, Plan, Create, and Improve).

=== Chinese Program ===
There are four streams with simplified characters taught in Chinese Foundation Level (CFL) and Chinese Standard Level (CSL), while traditional characters are used in Chinese Higher Level (CHL) and Chinese Advanced Level (CAL).

== Background ==
In a 2014 school allocation exercise organized by the Hong Kong Government, Esol Education was one of five successful groups amongst 46 who submitted bids for new international school site licences. Esol was assigned the former Buddhist Hui Yuan College in Tai Po.

The seven-storey, 5,770 m^{2} facility was built in 1992. In 2004, a new wing was added. In 2012, Buddhist Hui Yuan College was closed due to declining enrolment. Esol Education retrofitted the entire exterior and interior of the building. In addition to providing all new floors, ceilings, walls, plumbing, electrical, millwork, etc., Esol also refitted the premises to increase multi-purpose space, added learning technology capabilities, and altered the Science and specialty areas to bring them in line with curriculum plans and the current pedagogical approach to teaching and learning.

== Accreditations ==
ASHK is fully accredited for grades KG–12 by the Accrediting Commission for Schools, Western Association of Schools and Colleges, and the Middle States Association of Schools and Colleges. ASHK is also an IB World School, authorized to offer the IB Diploma Programme (IBDP) in Grades 11 and 12.

== Extracurricular activities ==
Activities for students include sports, arts, service learning (as part of the school's CAS program), clubs and leadership. ASHK students can participate in various field trips around Hong Kong (such as overnight camps for Grade 4-5 and overseas trips for middle school students).

ASHK is a member of the International Schools Sports Federation Hong Kong (ISSFHK) and got a bronze medal at 2020-2021 school year.
