= Hong Kong Baptist University Affiliated School Wong Kam Fai Secondary and Primary School =

Primary and secondary school in Hong Kong

- 香港浸會大學附屬學校王錦輝中小學
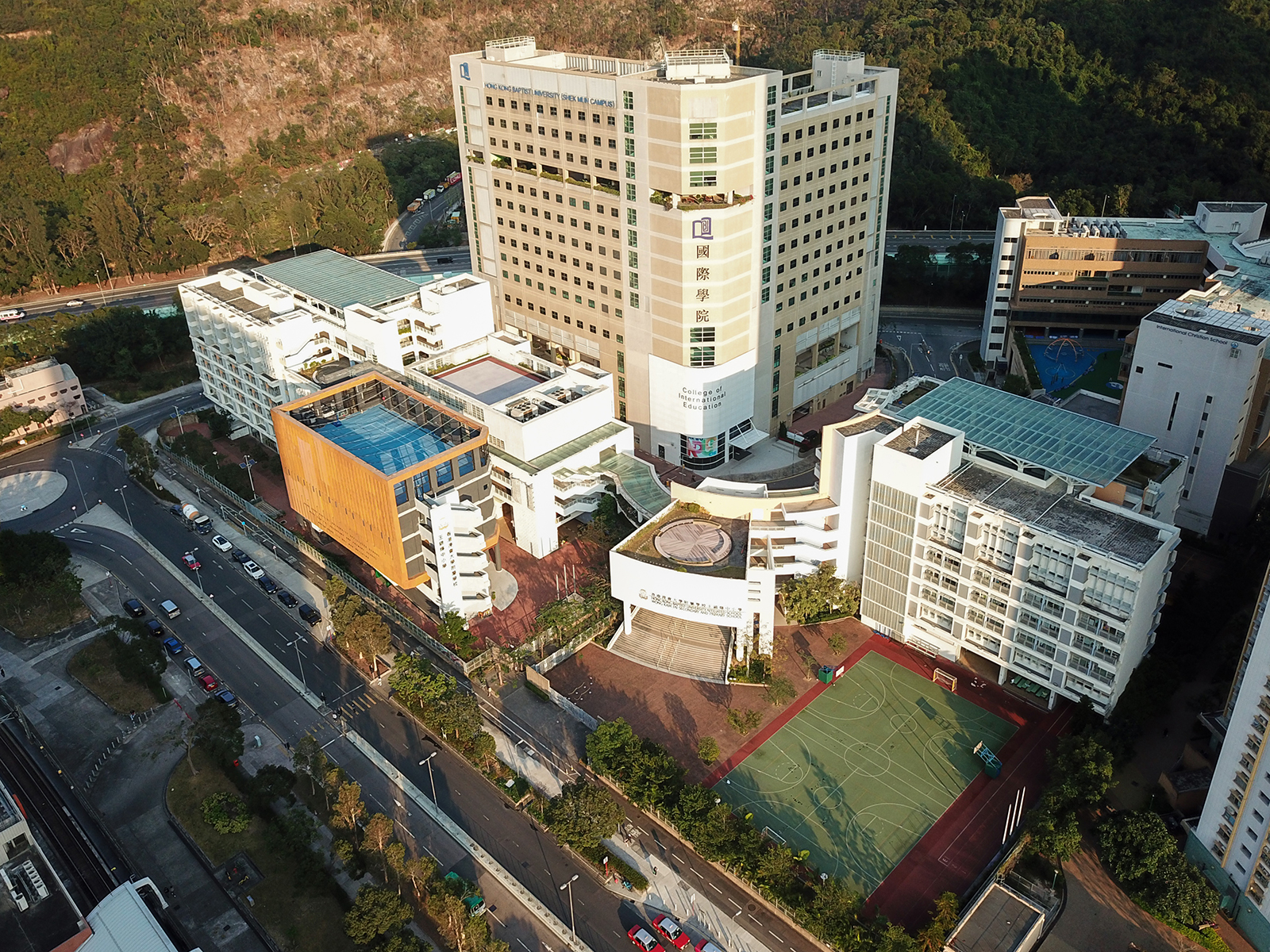
- An aerial view of both the primary and secondary division of the school

Location
- No. 6 On Muk Lane, Shek Mun, Sha Tin, New Territories; 22.3873°N 114.2096°E

Information
- Type: Direct Subsidy coeducational school
- Motto: Passionate to learn, with confidence. Determined to succeed, with vision.
- Established: 2006
- School district: Sha Tin District
- President: Professor Frank Fu Hoo Kin, BBS, MH, JP
- Principal: Dr. Benjamin Chan Wai Kai, MH
- Affiliation: Hong Kong Baptist University
- Website: www.hkbuas.edu.hk

Hong Kong Baptist University Affiliated School Wong Kam Fai Secondary and Primary School (Chinese: 香港浸會大學附屬學校王錦輝中小學; abbreviated as HKBUAS or HKBU WKFS) is a Direct Subsidy school in Shek Mun, Sha Tin, Hong Kong. It is the first affiliated school opened by a university in Hong Kong. The school was officially established in 2006, and the first batch of students began attending classes in September of the same year. The school has a total area of 9,000 square metres (97,000 sq ft) and the primary and secondary divisions are connected together.

== History ==
In 2013, the school announced to build an integrated building, later renamed as "Wong Liu Wai Man Building" (王廖惠文大樓). The building was built on the two basketball courts, which is originated in the G/F of the secondary division. The building is opened in early 2016.

== School facilities ==
- Library
- Tuck shop
- Hall
- Lecture theatre
- Atrium
- Sky garden
- Art gallery
- Dance room
- Indoor gymnasium
- Playground
- Running track
- Rock climbing wall
- Indoor playground
- Indoor running track
- Swimming Pool
- Performing Arts Theatre
- Fencing Center
- Canteen
- 21st Century Classrooms

== Student House/Chambers ==
=== Primary division ===
- Justice (yellow)
- Wisdom (blue)
- Kindness (green)
- Courtesy (red)
- Faith (purple)

=== Secondary division ===
- Aristotle (yellow)
- Beethoven (blue)
- Columbus (green)
- Da Vinci (red)
- Einstein (purple)

== Historical student unions in secondary division ==
- 2011-2012: Sprout
- 2012-2013: Helios
- 2013-2014: CaterPillar
- 2014-2015: H_{2}O
- 2015-2016: Phoenix
- 2016: Zipper
- 2016-2017: DNA
- 2017-2018: Patronus
- 2018-2019: Polaris
- 2019-2020: Linear
- 2020-2021: Parasol
- 2021-2022: Pixel
- 2022-2023: Panorama
- 2023-2024: Plumeria
- 2024-2025: Renaissance
- 2025-2026: Luminary
- 2026-2027: Wisteria

== Class structure and curriculum ==
There are altogether 30 classes in Secondary division, 5 classes (A, B, C, D, E) in each grade.

- Grade 7: 5 classes
- Grade 8: 5 classes
- Grade 9: 5 classes
- Grade 10: 5 classes
- Grade 11: 5 classes
- Grade 12: 5 classes

Grade 7 to 9 (F1-F3) offer a broad general curriculum with a good balance among languages, arts, science, cultural as well as liberal studies and physical education.

Students can choose to study either Hong Kong Diploma of Secondary Education Examination (HKDSE) or GCE A-Level curriculum in grade 10 to 12 (F4-F6). For Students who take the Hong Kong Diploma of Secondary Education Examination (HKDSE) at the end of grade 12 (F6), they can use the Joint University Programmes Admission System (JUPAS) for the admission to tertiary institutes.

In grade 10 to 12 (F4-F6) (NSS curriculum), students can choose 2 to 4 electives subjects besides the 4 core subjects: Chinese, English, Mathematics and Liberal Studies.

There are two classes arranged in grade 11 to 12 (F5-F6) for students who would like to take GCE A-Level exam, grade 10 (F4) students can join the IGCSE top up course arranged by the school.

As an E.M.I. (English as the Medium of Instruction) school, Wong Kam Fai Secondary and Primary School adopts English as the teaching medium in most subjects with the aim of achieving biliteracy (Chinese and English) and trilingualism with the inclusion of Putonghua.

All subjects, except Chinese Language, Chinese History, and liberal studies, are taught in English unless the student chooses English as the medium for liberal studies in grade 10 to 12 (F4-F6).

Lessons are arranged on a 5-day week basis. Some school team training, uniform team training, supplementary classes and instrument classes are offered after school and on Saturdays.

== Controversies ==
=== Allegations of censorship ===
Some students questioned the school of political censorship, including prohibiting students from wearing black and yellow surgical masks, which hold connotations to the pro-democracy protest movement. Violators would face the risk of receiving a "demerit" from the school. In the school yearbook, the school used blurry photos to cover the protest mascot "Pepe the Frog" wallpaper in the background. The school further specified that the scope of school regulations includes online behaviour outside school.

Some students pointed out that the school has never explicitly prohibited students from participating in activities related to the 2019–2020 Hong Kong protests. After some senior students created a Lennon wall and posted materials related to the protest inside the classroom, senior staff asked students to remove them. In addition, the school had also repeatedly discouraged students from gathering in the campus to sing the song "Glory to Hong Kong" as well as yelling out the protest slogans. Moreover, the school regulations do not have a mask guideline that requires students to wear a "normal colour" mask defined by the school.

Wong Kam Fai Secondary and Primary School replied to Apple Daily stating that they did not revise the school guidelines and rules given to students, except that if students are found bullying others and other inappropriate behaviors in the Internet, they will follow up in accordance with the established guidance and assistance mechanism. For the issue of surgical masks, the school is in line with the school's usual principles of "simple dress and appearance". It is recommended that faculty and students should wear light-coloured surgical masks. They can also be obtained from the school office if necessary. It also emphasizes that school journals, school regulations, and epidemic prevention arrangements are all internal affairs of the school.

=== COVID-19 test complaints ===
The Stand News reports on February 9, 2021 that Wong Kam Fai Secondary and Primary School requires all faculty and staff of the school to undergo regular COVID-19 test every two weeks without consulting the teachers beforehand. The school did not deny the relevant arrangements, but they replied that they did not receive any objection from colleagues.
