= Hong Kong Academy =

School in Hong Kong

Coordinates: 22.38585°N 114.27508°E

- 香港學堂國際學校

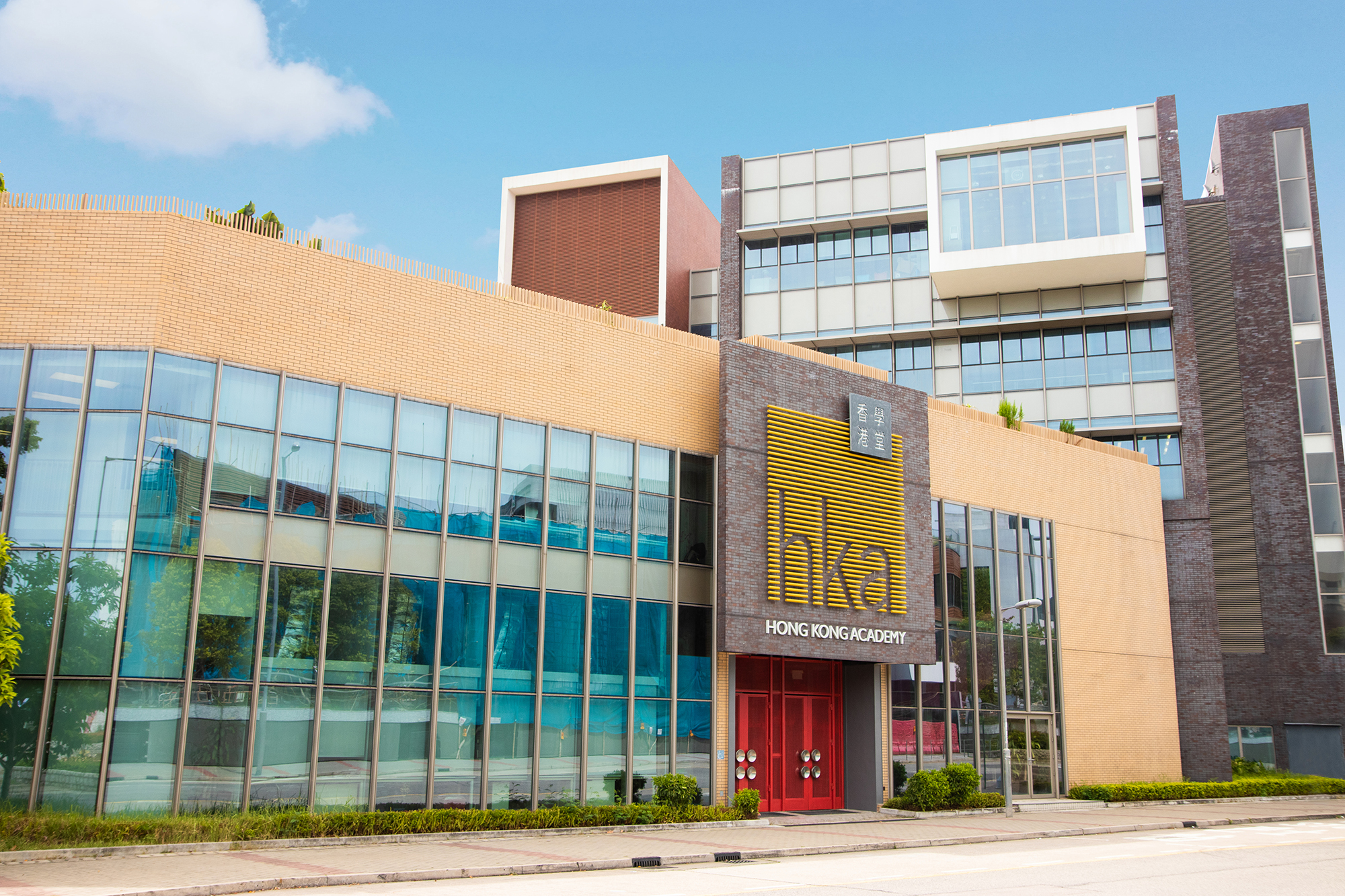

Location
- 33 Wai Man Road, Sai Kung, New Territories; Hong Kong

Information
- School type: Private, non-profit, International, Kindergarten, Primary, Secondary, Co-educational
- Established: 2000
- Primary School Principal: Virginia Hunt
- Secondary School Principal: Joanna Crimmins
- Head of school: Kasson Bratton
- Grades: Pre-K1 to Grade 12
- Enrollment: 530+
- Education system: International Baccalaureate (IBO)
- Mascot: Dragonfly
- Accreditation: International Baccalaureate Organisation (IBO); Council of International Schools (CIS); Western Association of Schools and Colleges (WASC); Global Citizen Diploma (GCD)
- Affiliation: International Schools Theatre Association (ISTA); Association of China and Mongolia International Schools (ACAMIS); East Asia Regional Council of Overseas Schools (EARCOS); Next Frontier Inclusion (NFI)
- Information: School Mission Hong Kong Academy nurtures a culture of belonging that inspires students to become intellectually curious, intrinsically motivated, and interculturally minded global citizens.
- Website: www.hkacademy.edu.hk

Hong Kong Academy
- Traditional Chinese: 香港學堂
- Simplified Chinese: 香港学堂
Transcriptions
Standard Mandarin
- Hanyu Pinyin: Xiānggǎng Xuétáng
Yue: Cantonese
- Jyutping: hoeng1 gong2 hok6 tong4

Hong Kong Academy (HKA, Chinese: 香港學堂國際學校) is a non-profit independent international co-educational day school for students ages 3–18 in Hong Kong. The school was founded in 2000 by Teresa Richman and Ben Frankel. The middle school was added in September 2006, and in 2007 the board approved the inclusion of a high school programme that began in the 2008/9 academic year. HKA graduated its first IB Diploma cohort in May 2012, and celebrated its 25th anniversary during the 2025–2026 academic year.

== Campus ==
The campus was originally located on Stubbs Road in Wan Chai and then moved to Kennedy Town for 3 years in 2010. In August 2013, the school moved to its new permanent site in Sai Kung. In 2020, Hong Kong Green Building Council awarded the Gold BEAM Plus certificate to The Sai Kung Campus for its environmentally friendly design.

== Curriculum ==
Hong Kong Academy is one of eight fully authorized three-programme International Baccalaureate World Schools in Hong Kong, offering the Primary Years Programme (PYP), Middle Years Programme (MYP) and Diploma Programme (DP). All HKA graduates earn the HKA diploma and the GCD certificate, most also pursue the full IB Diploma or IB courses.

== Awards ==
- Ritzy Education Awards, November 2025
  - All-Through School of the Year
  - Kindergarten Principal of the Year
- Community Investment and Inclusion Fund, Social Capital Builder award, December 2024
- Ritzy Education Awards, November 2024
  - Hong Kong International School of the Year
  - Kindergarten Principal of the Year
- Ritzy Education Awards, November 2023
  - Hong Kong International School of the Year
  - Kindergarten Principal of the Year
  - Teacher of the Year
- Ritzy Education Awards, November 2022
  - Hong Kong International School of the Year
  - Secondary School Principal of the Year
- Hong Kong Living Education Awards 2021
  - All Through School of the Year
  - Most Socially Responsible School
  - Hong Kong International School of the Year
  - Best School Strategic Plan
- Green Building Council of Hong Kong Gold BEAM+ status, 2020

== See also ==
- List of schools in Sai Kung District
