= Hong Kong Chinese Christian Churches Union Logos Academy =

Coordinates: 22.30731°N 114.25133°E

The Hong Kong Chinese Christian Churches Union Logos Academy
- 香港華人基督教聯會真道書院
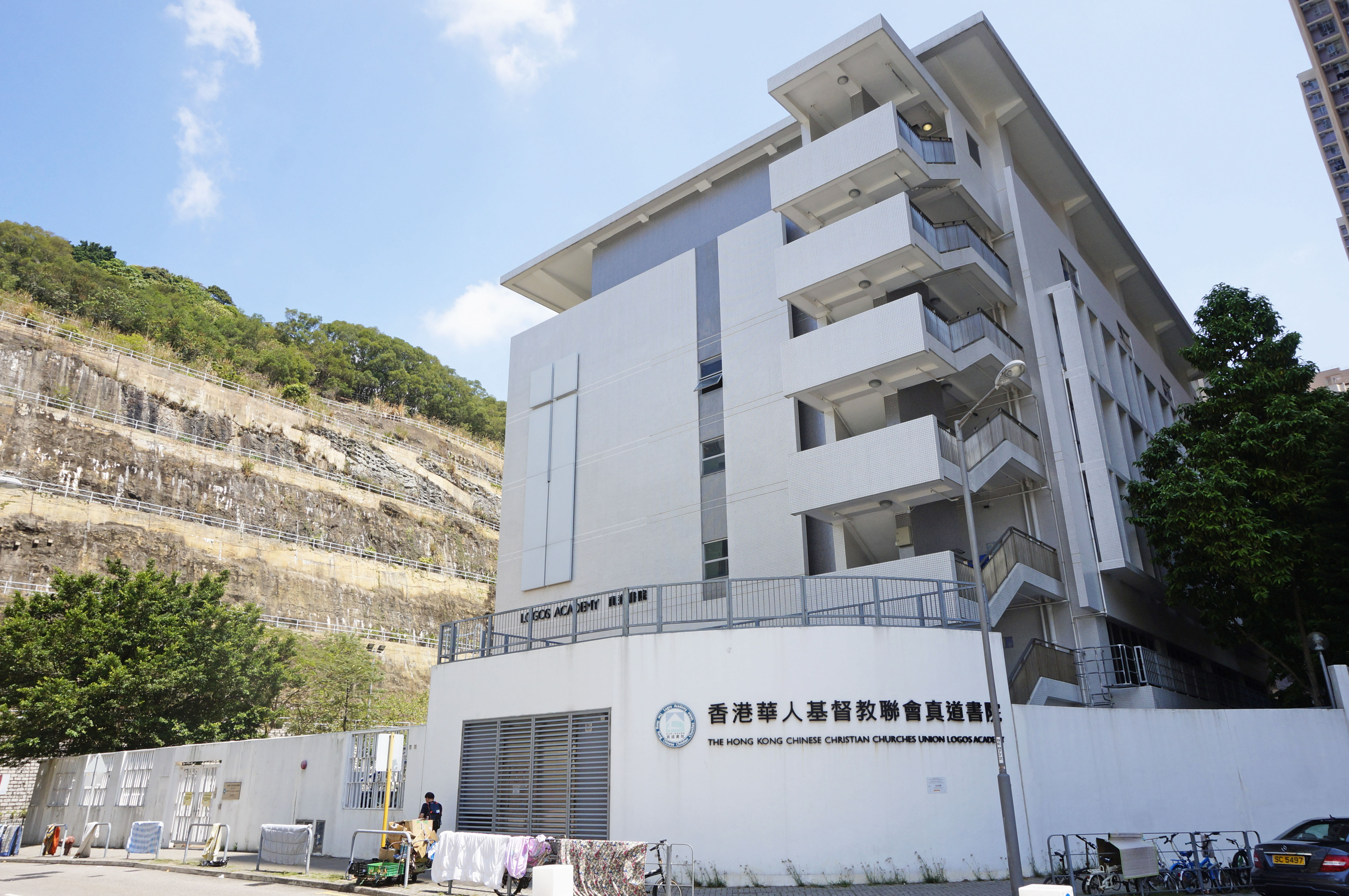
- Hong Kong Chinese Christian Churches Union Logos Academy

Location
- No. 5, Ling Kwong Street, Tseung Kwan O, Hong Kong.

Information
- Type: Direct Subsidy Scheme school
- Motto: Chinese: 求真行道，達善臻美 (Pursue the truth, practice the Tao, achieve goodness and perfection.)
- Religious affiliation: Protestantism
- Established: 2002 (primary section); 2003 (secondary section)
- Principal: Richard Lee
- Color: Purple
- Affiliation: Hong Kong Chinese Christian Union
- Website: www.logosacademy.edu.hk

Hong Kong Chinese Christian Churches Union Logos Academy (HKCCCULA) is the first school of the Hong Kong Chinese Christian Churches Union. It is located in Tiu Keng Leng, Sai Kung District, New Territories, Hong Kong.

It has three school buildings and is a public school. HKCCCULA is also a Direct Subsidy-funded International Baccalaureate school.

== School curriculum structure ==
The structure of HKCCCULA differs from other ordinary primary and secondary schools in Hong Kong. HKCCCULA adopts an eleven-year academic system, with two years of the basic stage, five years of the expansion stage and four years of the mastery stage. In addition, HKCCCULA has "one school, two systems", that is, the 3–3–4 academic system and the International Baccalaureate Diploma program.

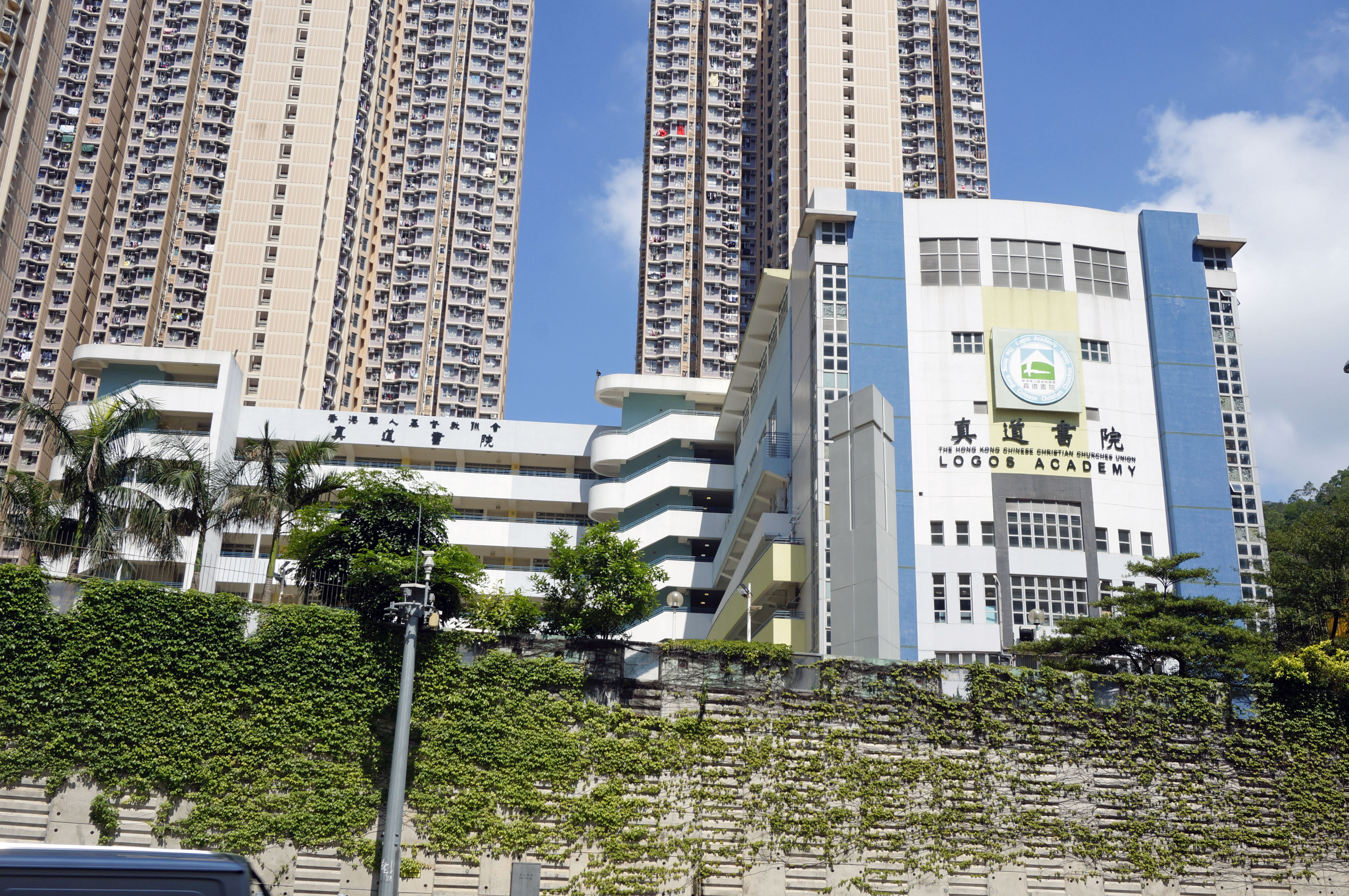
Primary school building

In 2010, HKCCCULA's Form 5 students were the last cohort to take the Secondary Education Examination. The last batch of secondary school students who were not admitted directly to the school were the Form 6 and Form 7 students who graduated in 2012.

== School-based planning ==
HKCCCULA is an International Baccalaureate Organization school in Hong Kong that teaches both the Hong Kong New Senior Secondary Curriculum and the International Baccalaureate Diploma (IBDP) curriculum.

Compared to the educational system of traditional schools in Hong Kong, the primary school curriculum is only five years, and the entire primary and secondary school curriculum is only 11 years, one year less than that of traditional schools.

In 2022, HKCCCULA had two students who scored full marks in the International Baccalaureate Diploma program.

== Extracurricular activities ==
In 2023, HKCCCULA participated in Hong Kong's first Butterfly Garden Certification Program to mark the National Ecology Day.
