= G.T. (Ellen Yeung) College =

Hong Kong full-time direct subsidy school

Coordinates: 22.3052°N 114.2503°E

- 優才（楊殷有娣）書院
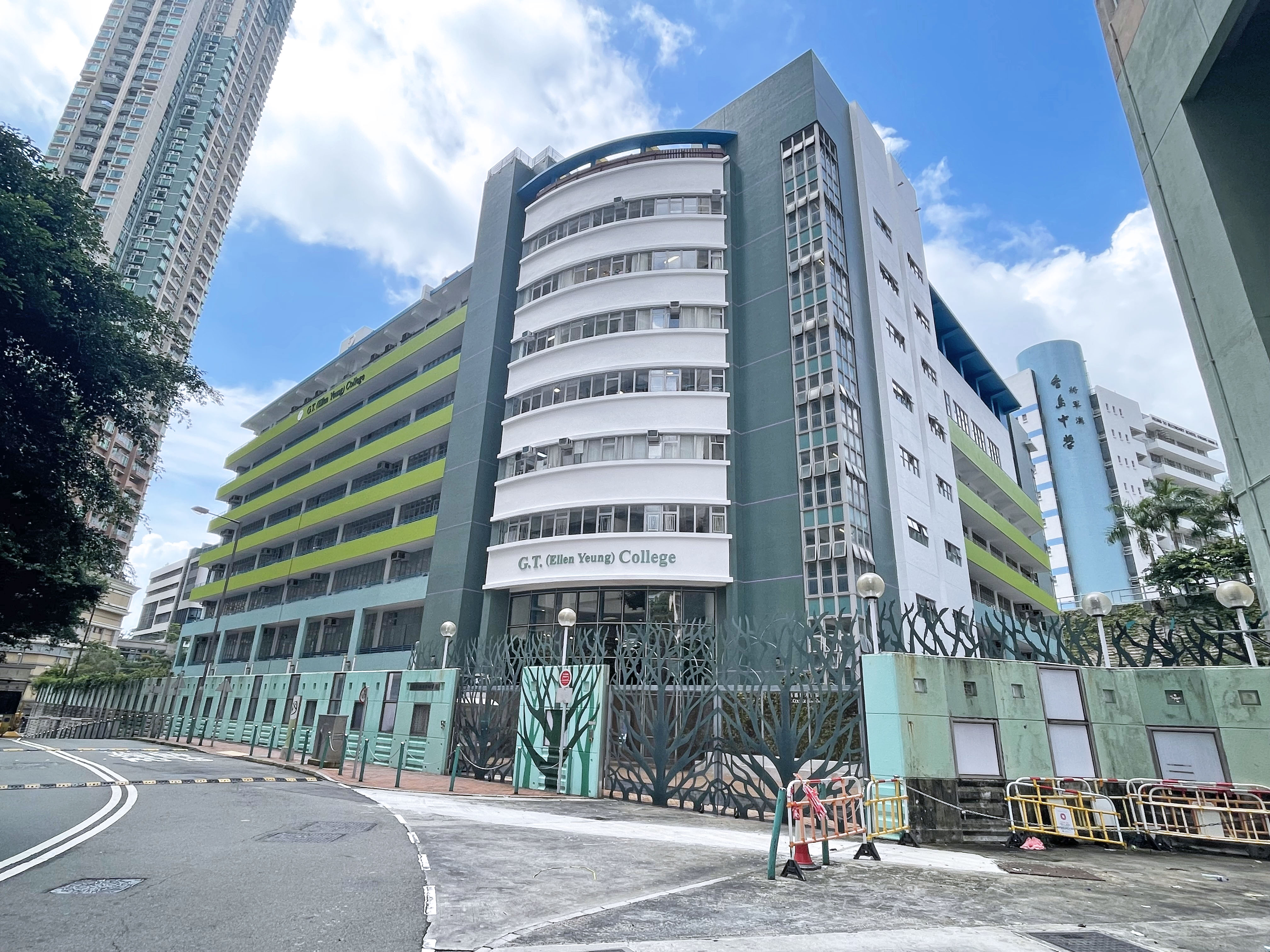

Location
- No. 10, Ling Kwong Street, Tiu Keng Leng, Tseung Kwan O, Sai Kung District, New Territories, Hong Kong; No. 31 Sai Sai Street, Mong Kok, Yau Tsim Mong District, Kowloon, Hong Kong

Information
- Type: Direct Subsidy School
- Motto: 愛心、創意、勤奮 (Love, creativity, diligence)
- Established: Primary: 1996; Secondary: 2005
- School district: Sai Kung
- President: Primary: Dr. David Chan; Secondary: Dr. Raymond Tam
- Staff: 200
- Enrollment: 1400
- Affiliation: Gifted Education Association
- Website: Primary：http://gtschool.hk/ Secondary：http://www.gtcollege.edu.hk/

G.T. (Ellen Yeung) College is a full-time direct subsidy school for boys and girls in Hong Kong.

It was founded by Prof. Rex Li and the Gifted Education Association in 1996. It provides twelve years of primary and secondary education.

== Curriculum ==
The school has implemented a school-wide multiple intelligence assessment program, which includes the Primary 1 and 3 Multiple Intelligence Test. These tests evaluate students across eight different areas of intelligence.

The school has implemented small class instruction with 24-26 pupils in each class, providing gifted classes in each subject designed to provide advanced and enriched curriculum develop their talents. There is training available for sports, allowing talented athletes to receive specialized coaching and training.

Students in the Secondary Section take external public examinations, including the Putonghua Proficiency Test (GAPSK) for primary and secondary schools in Hong Kong and Macao, and the KET and PET stage examinations of the Cambridge Examinations.

In the 2021, 12 students took the International Baccalaureate Diploma exam, with 3 students scoring full marks of 45 points, and being admitted to the University of Cambridge.

== Founding and Early Development ==
G.T. College held its inauguration ceremony in October 1996 at the Lei King Wan campus on Hong Kong Island, officiated by Sir David Akers-Jones, Honorary Chairman of the School's Board of Directors and former Chief Secretary of Hong Kong. Classes officially commenced on September 1, 1997, with all teaching staff wearing bachelor's, master's, and doctoral gowns in a solemn and dignified opening ceremony. In April 1998, the school established its Kowloon Tong campus at 131 Waterloo Road to meet the needs of students from the Kowloon and New Territories districts.

By August 2000, according to the Primary School Profile, all teachers at G.T. College held university degrees, leading the media to acclaim the school as the "Best Primary School Teaching Staff." After three years of persistent application, the school was finally allocated premises in Tseung Kwan O by the government in June 2001 to operate a Direct Subsidy Scheme (DSS) primary school. The following month, in July 2001, the inaugural cohort of students graduated, with over 80% allocated to English-medium secondary schools, including Diocesan Girls' School and Ying Wa College.

== Awards ==
In 2021, a student won a silver medal at the International Junior Science Olympiad. The competition is for secondary school students, testing students in physics, chemistry and biology, comprising written assessments and science experiments.

In 2023, students from the school represented Hong Kong physically for the first time in the 6th International Economic Olympiad.
