= International College Hong Kong =

Coordinates: 22°32′11″N 114°12′39″E

- New Territories; Hong Kong

Information
- Type: K-13, non-profit, international, co-educational, day school
- Established: 14 September 1983 (primary); 28 October 2009 (secondary)
- Head (HLY): Derek Pinchbeck (Primary)
- Head (Secondary): Sean McDermott
- Enrolment: 400+ (primary), 380 (secondary)
- Language: English
- School fees: HK$184,500 to HK$204,900 per annum (2025)
- Website: www.ichk.edu.hk

International College Hong Kong (ICHK) is an international kindergarten, primary and secondary school in Hong Kong–based in two campuses in the northeastern New Territories.

== ICHK Hong Lok Yuen ==
ICHK Hong Lok Yuen is a kindergarten and primary school located in the Hong Lok Yuen residential estate. It was established in the early 1980s. It was previously known as the Hong Lok Yuen International School.

The school is a fully authorised IB Primary Years Programme school. The school has a grass playing field as well as a playground, basketball court, school garden, and extensive open space that allows students to play and enjoy sports. The school is also an accredited Forest School Leadership Centre.

== ICHK Secondary ==
ICHK Secondary is an English-medium, international secondary school situated in the northeastern New Territories of Hong Kong. In 2017, it was recognised as a Cambridge Strategies 800 school.

It is a member of the Council of International Schools and an IB World School. It follows an inquiry-based approach to learning in the lower school while preparing students for the IGCSE in Years 10 and 11 and the IB Diploma in Years 12 and 13.

=== Location ===
ICHK secondary's campus lies in Shek Chung Au, a rural area on the north-west corner of Starling Inlet and near Luk Keng in Plover Cove Country Park.

=== Partner schools ===
ICHK Secondary was established on 28 October 2009 with the support of its three partner schools ICHK-Hong Lok Yuen, Japanese International School and Kingston International School. Primary students from the partner schools are offered guaranteed places at ICHK offering a through-train education from kindergarten to Year 13. Students from other primary schools and from outside Hong Kong are also admitted.
