= Australian International School Hong Kong =

- 香港澳洲國際學校

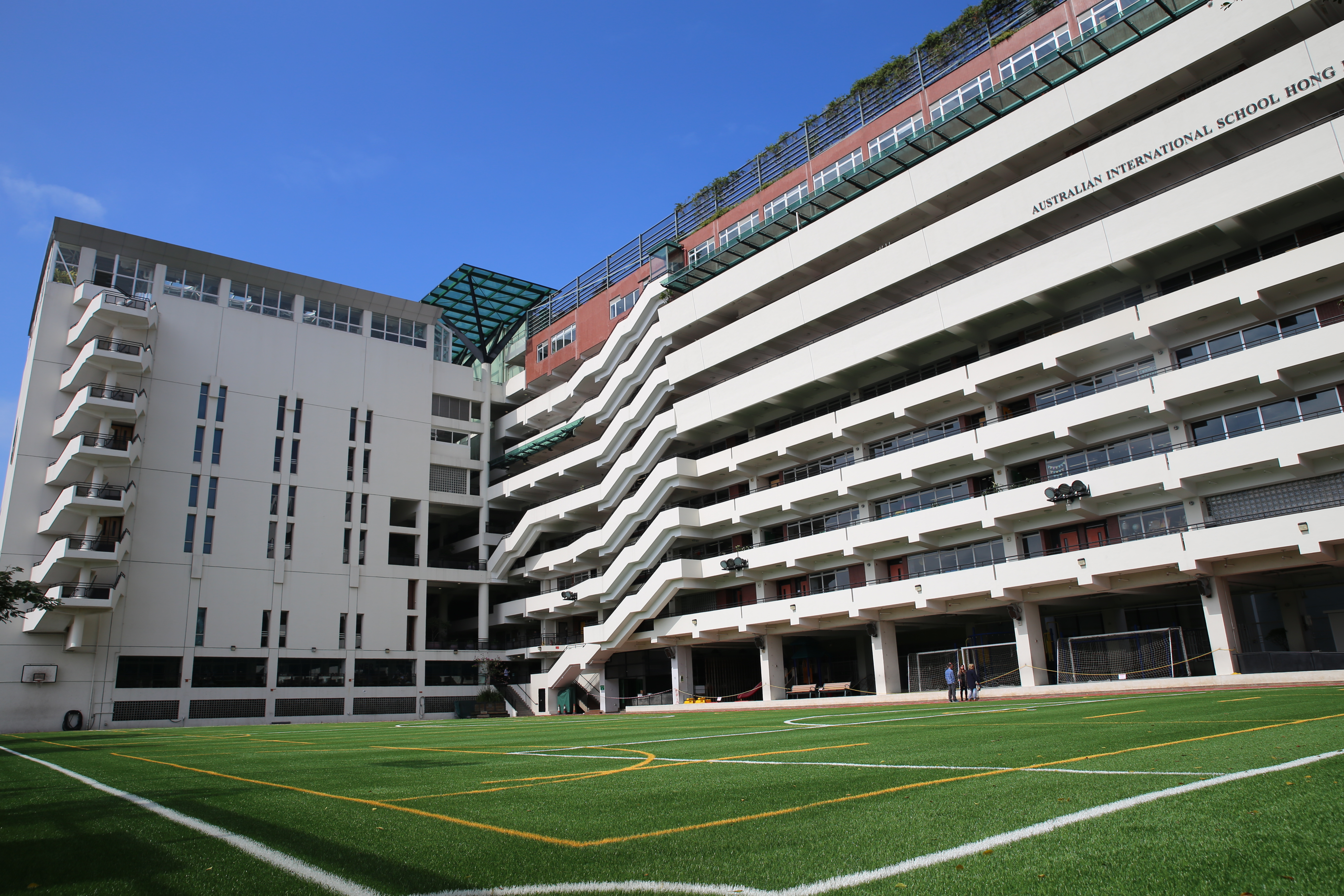
- School field and building in 2019

Location
- 3A Norfolk Road, Kowloon Tong; Kowloon, Hong Kong; China; 22°20′8″N 114°10′42″E

Information
- Other name: AISHK
- Type: Private international school
- Motto: Connect, Strive, Flourish!
- Religious affiliation: None
- Established: 6 February 1995; 31 years ago
- Head of school: Mina Dunstan
- Staff: 107 (2025)
- Years: Reception–12
- Gender: Boys Girls
- Language: English
- Houses: Eucalypt; Jacaranda; Waratah; Wattle
- Colours: Green and gold
- School fees: HK$156,200 to HK$265,400 per annum (2026)
- Website: www.aishk.edu.hk

Chinese name
- Traditional Chinese: 香港澳洲國際學校
- Simplified Chinese: 香港澳洲国际学校
Transcriptions
Standard Mandarin
- Hanyu Pinyin: Xiānggǎng Àozhōu Guójì Xuéxiào
Yue: Cantonese
- Yale Romanization: Hēung góng Ou jāu gwok jai hohk haauh
- Jyutping: Hoeng1 gong2 ou3 zau1 gwok3 zai3 hok6 haau6

The Australian International School Hong Kong (AISHK, Chinese: 香港澳洲國際學校) is a private co-educational international school in Kowloon Tong, Kowloon, Hong Kong, China. Established in 1995, the school provides education for children from Preparatory to Year 12 plus a Reception (K2) kindergarten class.

== History ==
The school was founded to fulfill the growing demand for an Australian educational institution in Hong Kong. Brian Davies, a teacher at the Canadian International School who had lived in Hong Kong since 1986, was approached by members of the Australian Association of Hong Kong to create an Australian school. Additionally, local Hong Kong businessmen suggested to Davies to create a school to prepare their children for the possibility of studying in Australian universities upon graduation. The school opened on 6 February 1995 and in 1999 the first group Year 12 students were awarded their NSW School Certificate.

In 1996 it began its secondary education levels.

The school's permanent campus in Kowloon Tong was opened on 4 September 2001, with student numbers growing to over 500 students that year.

Mina Dunstan is currently the Head of School since 2023. Peter Phillips is the current Head of Secondary, and Jane Thomas is the current Head of Primary.

== Curriculum ==
The school offers education from Reception to Year 12. The primary curriculum is based on the Australian National Curriculum that has been adapted to suit the international setting. Students in Year 7-10 follow the NSW Stage 4 & 5 Syllabus developed by the New South Wales Education Standards Authority. In Years 11 and 12, students can select either the Higher School Certificate of the New South Wales Education Standards Authority or the IB Diploma Programme. Mandarin Chinese is taught to all students in the Primary school, and it is offered as an elective in Years 7–10.

== School system ==
The school follows a southern hemisphere calendar where the school year starts in January or February and ends in mid-December. The school year is broken up into four terms, with breaks usually in April, July, October, and December.

The school operates under a House system where each student is assigned to a House. The Houses compete against each other each year in competitions to win points. At the end of the school year, the House with the most points is awarded the House Cup. The Houses are named after Australian plants: Eucalypt (green), Jacaranda (blue), Waratah (red), and Wattle (yellow).

As of 1996, the school uses Australian school holidays.

== Campus ==
The AISHK building is ten stories tall with facilities such as an artificially turfed sports field, two double-height gymnasiums on the 4th and 6th floors, an auditorium, a library, an aquatic centre with a 25-metre swimming pool, and a green roof.

The campus building was the winner of the 2001 HKIA Medal of the Year, Hong Kong's foremost architectural award.

== Notable alumni ==
- Daniel Bennie, Australian soccer player currently with English Championship side Queens Park Rangers.
- Stephanie Cheng, singer
- Viking Wong, Brazilian jiu-jitsu practitioner and fashion designer
