= International Christian School (Hong Kong) =

- Chinese: 基督教國際學校

Location
- 1 On Muk Lane; Shek Mun, Sha Tin; Hong Kong; 22.387016°N 114.210530°E

Information
- School type: International School, Private
- Motto: Instruction for Life, Commitment to Christ, Service to the Community
- Religious affiliation: Nondenominational Christianity
- Established: 1 September 1992; 33 years ago
- Kindergarten Principal: Gillian Wu
- Elementary Assistant Principal: Erin Johnson
- Elementary Principal: Keith Welch
- Middle School Principal: William Schroeder
- High School Principal: Kiel Nation
- Head of school: Nick Seward
- Staff: 191
- Teaching staff: 105
- Grades: Kindergarten to Grade 12
- Gender: coed
- Enrollment: 1246 (2024-2025)
  - Kindergarten: 141
- Student to teacher ratio: 1:20 in elementary school, 1:11 in middle school, 1:9 in high school
- Language: English
- Campuses: Shek Mun and Ma On Shan
- Campus size: 0.63 hectares (1.6 acres) (Shek Mun)
- Mascot: Warriors
- Accreditations: WASC and ACSI
- Annual tuition: HK$71,400 (Kindergarten, half day classes); HK$125,100 (Grade 1-5); HK$165,700 (Grade 6-8); HK$169,900 (Grade 9-12)
- Website: www.ics.edu.hk
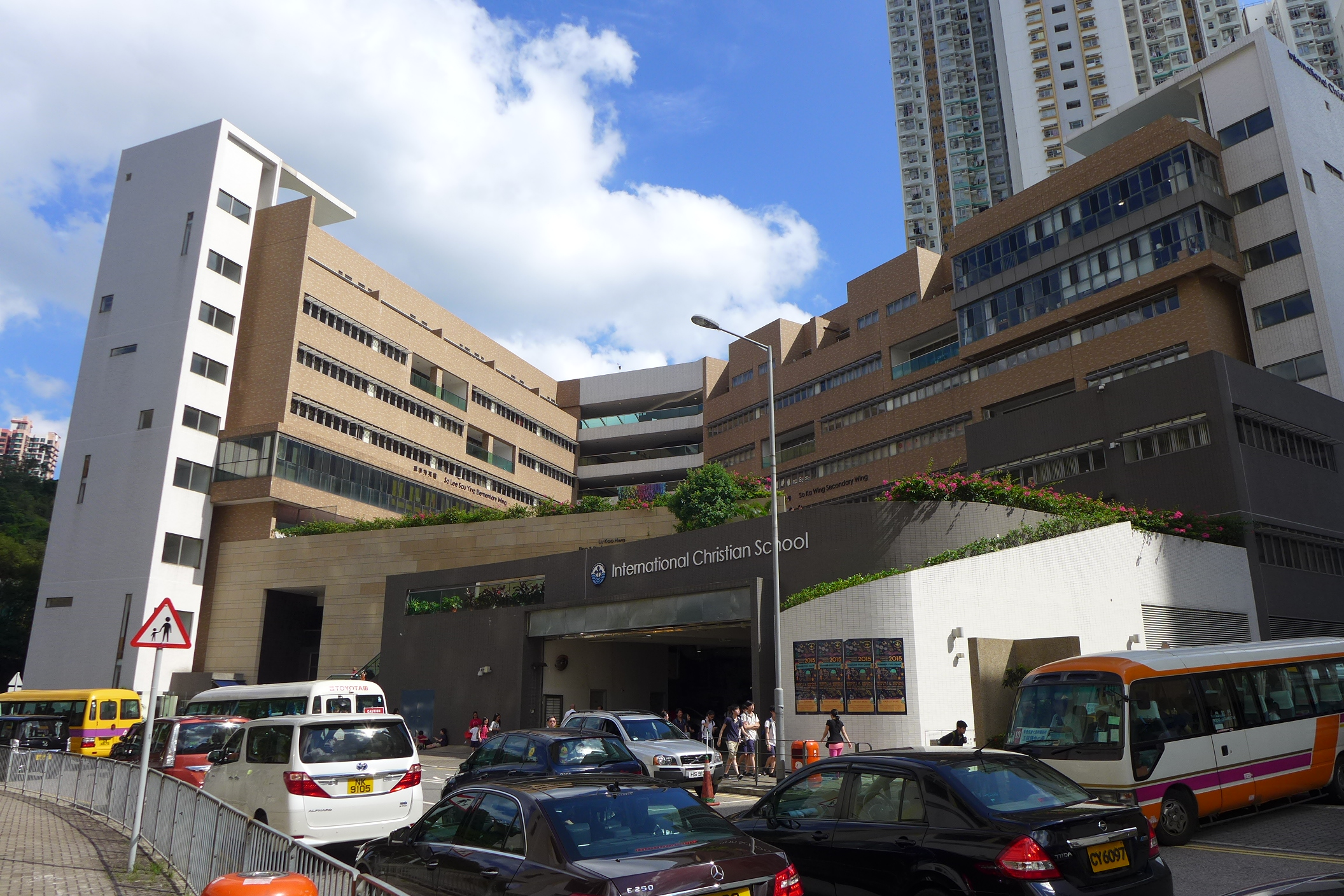
- Shek Mun Campus
- Last updated: Dec 2025

International Christian School is an English language, Christian independent school in Hong Kong near Shek Mun station. Opened on 1 September 1992, it provides education at all grades from kindergarten to the senior secondary levels.

== Curriculum ==
International Christian School (ICS) is based on an American curriculum (SAT/AP). ICS students are evaluated through MAP testing during elementary, and PSAT and SAT in high school. In high school, students have gradually increasing freedom in choosing their courses. However, students must obtain a required number of credits each year, as well as a minimum number of credits in certain core disciplines in order to graduate. International Christian School offers Advanced Placement (AP) courses in art, biology, chemistry, physics, environmental science, computer science, pre-calculus, statistics, calculus, English language, English literature, world history, European history, US history, psychology, economics, comparative gov. and politics, music theory, seminar, research, Spanish, and Chinese.

=== Fine and performing arts ===
Music and art classes are taught to elementary students. Additionally, sports, art, and drama classes are offered throughout middle and high school.

General music classes are taken up to Grade 4, whereas in Grade 5 they are replaced with band, and strings. Both are then compulsory until high school, where students may choose to continue taking one or both.

All middle school students are required to take art, STEM, and drama classes in alternating semesters. In high school, students can choose to take visual arts or performing arts as long as they meet the credit requirements, which is 25 credits over 4 years.

=== Languages ===
Until Grade 6, classes in Mandarin are mandatory. Upon entering Grade 6, students can either continue taking courses in Mandarin or take classes in Spanish. However, the vast majority of students take Chinese in high school. ICS offers a wide variety of Mandarin and Spanish classes to cater to the wide variety of student language proficiencies.

=== Bible classes ===
Bible classes at ICS are compulsory in all grade levels.

=== Chapel ===
Student attendance at weekly chapels is mandatory. All-school assemblies occur a few times every year. In middle and high school, worship services are led by student worship teams.

== Campuses ==
International Christian School was originally located at 45-47 Grampian Road in Kowloon City. After a few years, a new campus was opened in Lai Yiu. In the 2001–2002 school year, all elementary grade levels moved to a new campus in Fo Tan, which is in Sha Tin, and the secondary grade levels moved entirely to the Kowloon City campus. Until the 2007-2008 academic year, the secondary campus, which consists of middle and high school, was in Kowloon City, and the kindergarten and elementary campuses were in Fotan. In the 2007–2008 school year, the elementary and secondary campuses moved into a new building in Shek Mun, which is located near Sha Tin.

=== Ma On Shan Campus ===
Beginning in the 2012–2013 school year, the kindergarten campus is located at Chung On Estate (Heng On station of Tuen Ma line) on the ground floor of Kam Fung Court. The P1 grade, which serves as the final year of kindergarten, is located in Shek Mun, as well as the elementary school, which contains grades 1–5, the middle school, which consists of grades 6–8, and finally, the high school, which consists of grades 9-12.

=== Shek Mun Campus ===
The Shek Mun campus was constructed to represent God's hands spread out. The building is divided into two wings. The first three floors of the building are shared by both the elementary and the secondary. These floors contain most of the music rooms, the two gymnasiums, the theater, and various rooms used by the administration. The next four floors consist of general classrooms, computer labs, science labs, libraries, and art rooms. Finally, the seventh floor is used to house some teachers and their families. The building's floor numbers start at the ground floor, following the British system commonly used in Hong Kong.

== Notable alumni ==
- Elliot Leung, film composer, notable for Operation Red Sea
- Eudice Chong - Professional tennis player
