= List of schools in Kwai Tsing District =

This is a list of schools in Kwai Tsing District, Hong Kong.

== Secondary schools ==
Aided

- Buddhist Sin Tak College (佛教善德英文中學)
- Buddhist Yip Kei Nam Memorial College (佛教葉紀南紀念中學)
- Caritas St Joseph Secondary School (明愛聖若瑟中學)
- Carmel Alison Lam Foundation Secondary School (迦密愛禮信中學)
- CCC Chuen Yuen College (中華基督教會全完中學)
- CCC Yenching College (中華基督教會燕京書院)
- CNEC Christian College (中華傳道會安柱中學)
- CNEC Lee I Yao Memorial Secondary School (中華傳道會李賢堯紀念中學)
- Cotton Spinners Association Secondary School (棉紡會中學)
- DMHC Siu Ming Catholic Secondary School (天主教母佑會蕭明中學)
- HKSYC & IA Chan Nam Chong Memorial College (香港四邑商工總會陳南昌紀念中學)
- HKTA The Yuen Yuen Institute No. 1 Secondary School (香港道教聯合會圓玄學院第一中學)
- Ju Ching Chu Secondary School (Kwai Chung) (裘錦秋中學（葵涌）)
- Kiangsu-Chekiang College (Kwai Chung) (葵涌蘇浙公學)
- Kwai Chung Methodist College (葵涌循道中學)
- Lai King Catholic Secondary School (荔景天主教中學)
- Lingnan Dr Chung Wing Kwong Memorial Secondary School (嶺南鍾榮光博士紀念中學)
- Lions College (獅子會中學)
- Lok Sin Tong Ku Chiu Man Secondary School (樂善堂顧超文中學)
- Lok Sin Tong Leung Chik Wai Memorial School (樂善堂梁植偉紀念中學)
- Methodist Lee Wai Lee College (李惠利中學)
- Po Leung Kuk Lo Kit Sing (1983) College (保良局羅傑承（一九八三）中學)
- Pope Paul VI College (保祿六世書院)
- Queen's College Old Boys' Association Secondary School (皇仁舊生會中學)
- Salesians of Don Bosco Ng Siu Mui Secondary School (天主教慈幼會伍少梅中學)
- Shek Lei Catholic Secondary School (石籬天主教中學)
- SKH Lam Woo Memorial Secondary School (聖公會林護紀念中學)
- STFA Lee Shau Kee College (順德聯誼總會李兆基中學)
- TWGH Chen Zao Men College (東華三院陳兆民中學)
- TWGH Mrs Wu York Yu Memorial College (東華三院伍若瑜夫人紀念中學)
- TWGH SC Gaw Memorial College (東華三院吳祥川紀念中學)

== Primary schools ==
Aided

- Asbury Methodist Primary School (亞斯理衛理小學)
- Buddhist Lam Bing Yim Memorial School (sponsored by the Hong Kong Buddhist Association) (佛教林炳炎紀念學校（香港佛教聯合會主辦）)
- Buddhist Lim Kim Tian Memorial Primary School (佛教林金殿紀念小學)
- CCC Chuen Yuen Second Primary School (中華基督教會全完第二小學)
- CCC Kei Chun Primary School (中華基督教會基真小學)
- CCC Cho Yiu Primary School (祖堯天主教小學)
- CNEC Lui Ming Choi Primary School (中華傳道會呂明才小學)
- CNEC Ta Tung School (中華傳道會許大同學校)
- ELCHK Kwai Shing Lutheran Primary School (基督教香港信義會葵盛信義學校)
- Father Cucchiara Memorial School (郭怡雅神父紀念學校)
- PLK Chan Yat Primary School (保良局陳溢小學)
- Po Leung Kuk Castar Primary School (保良局世德小學)
- S.K.H. Tsing Yi Chu Yan Primary School (聖公會青衣主恩小學)
- S.K.H. Yan Laap Memorial Primary School (聖公會仁立紀念小學)
- Salesian Yip Hon Millennium Primary School (慈幼葉漢千禧小學)
- Salesian Yip Hon Primary School (慈幼葉漢小學)
- Shek Lei Catholic Primary School (石籬天主教小學)
- Shek Lei St. John's Catholic Primary School (石籬聖若望天主教小學)
- SKH Chu Oi Primary School (聖公會主愛小學)
- SKH Chu Yan Primary School (聖公會主恩小學)
- SKH Ho Chak Wan Primary School (聖公會何澤芸小學)
- SKH Tsing Yi Estate Ho Chak Wan Primary School (聖公會青衣邨何澤芸小學)
- SKH Yan Laap Primary School (聖公會仁立小學)
- SRBCEPSA Lu Kwong Fai Memorial School (柏立基教育學院校友會盧光輝紀念學校)
- Tsing Yi Trade Association Primary School (青衣商會小學)
- Tsuen Wan Trade Association Primary School (荃灣商會學校
- TWGH Chow Yin Sum Primary School (東華三院周演森小學)
- T.W.G.HS Ko Ho Ning Memorial Primary School (東華三院高可寧紀念小學)
- TWGH Wong See Sum Primary School (東華三院黃士心小學)
- YCH Chiu Tsang Hok Wan Primary School (仁濟醫院趙曾學韞小學)

Direct Subsidy Scheme

- Delia (Man Kiu) English Primary School (地利亞（閩僑）英文小學)

== Special schools ==
Aided

- HKSYC & IA Chan Nom Chong Memorial School (香港四邑商工總會陳南昌紀念學校)
- Hong Chi Winifred Mary Cheung Morninghope School (匡智張玉瓊晨輝學校)
- Hong Kong Red Cross Hospital Schools Kwai Chung Hospital (香港紅十字會醫院學校)
- Lutheran School for the Deaf (路德會啓聾學校)
- PLK Mr & Mrs Chan Pak Keung Tsing Yi School (保良局陳百強伉儷青衣學校)
- SAHK B M Kotewall Memorial School (香港耀能協會羅怡基紀念學校)
- Sam Shui Natives Association Lau Pun Cheung School (三水同鄉會劉本章學校)

== Former schools ==
Government

- Ha Kwai Chung Government Secondary School (下葵涌官立中學)
- Sheung Kwai Chung Government Secondary School (上葵涌官立中學)

Other

- Po Leung Kuk Tsing Yi Secondary School (Skill Opportunity)
