= Kwai Tsing District =

District in Hong Kong

Kwai Tsing 葵青區
- District
- Kwai Tsing District
- Location of Kwai Tsing within Hong Kong
- Interactive map of Kwai Tsing
- Coordinates: 22°21′18″N 114°05′02″E
- Country: China
- SAR: Hong Kong
- Region: New Territories
- Constituencies: 32

Government
  - District Council Chairman: Lo Yuen-Ting
  - District Council Vice-Chairman: Chan Chi-Wing

Area
  - Total: 21.82 km^{2} (8.42 sq mi)

Population (2016)
  - Total: 520,572
  - Density: 23,860/km^{2} (61,790/sq mi)
- Time zone: UTC+8 (Hong Kong Time)
- Largest neighbourhood by population: Kwai Chung (167,455 – 2016, est.)
- Website: Kwai Tsing District Council

Kwai Tsing District
- Traditional Chinese: 葵青區
- Simplified Chinese: 葵青区
- Jyutping: Kwai4 Cing1 Keoi1
Transcriptions
Standard Mandarin
- Wade–Giles: Kʻui²-chʻing¹ Chʻü¹
Hakka
- Romanization: Kwi^{2} Ciang^{1} Ki^{1}
Yue: Cantonese
- Yale Romanization: Kwàih Chīng Kēui
- Jyutping: Kwai4 Cing1 Keoi1
- IPA: [kʷʰɐj˩.tsʰɪŋ˥ kʰɵɥ˥]

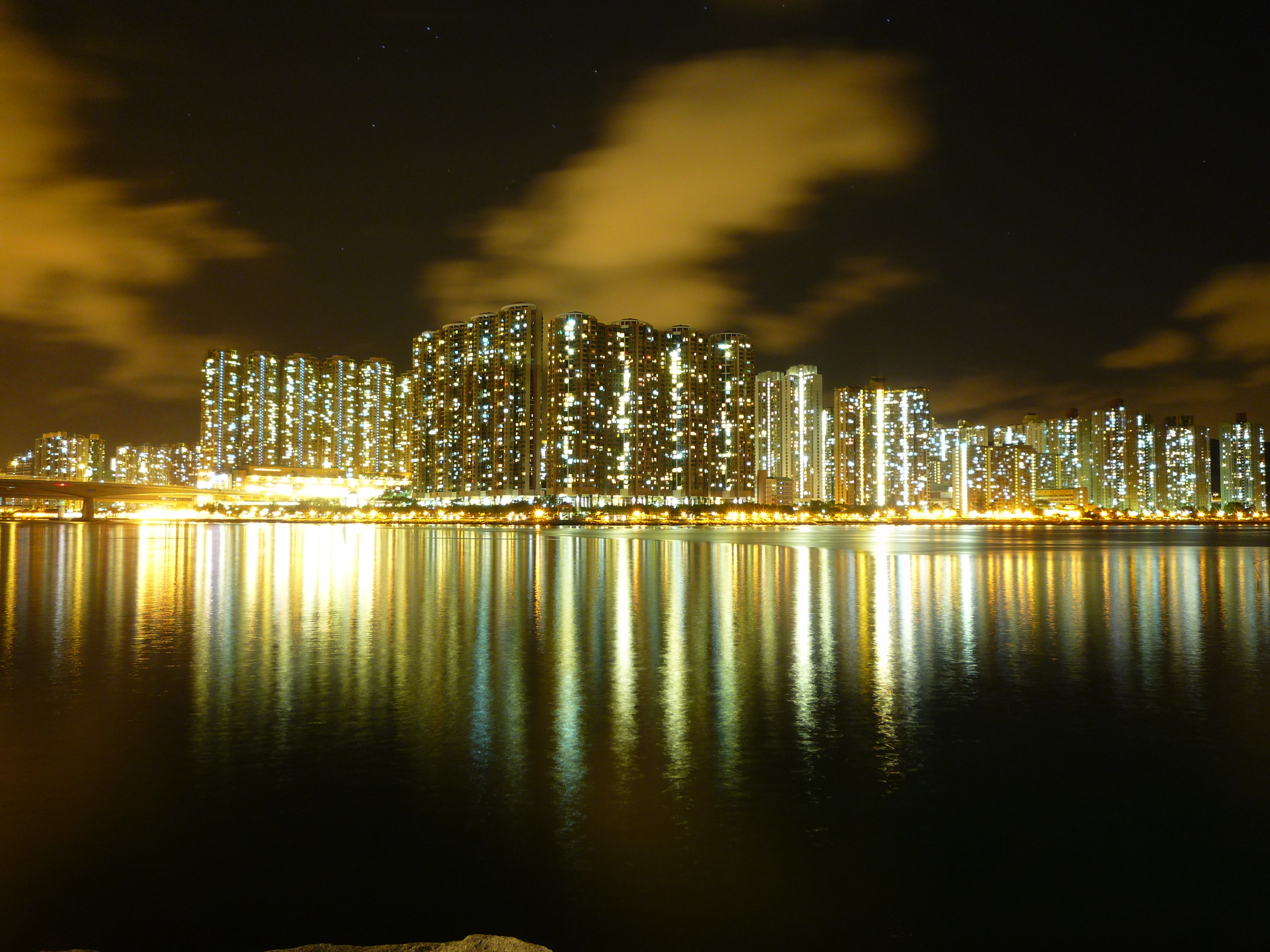
Villa Esplanada at the center, Maritime Square and Tsing Yi Bridge (North) on the left

Kwai Tsing District (Chinese: 葵青區) is one of the 18 districts of Hong Kong. It consists of two parts — Kwai Chung and Tsing Yi Island. Kwai Tsing is part of the New Territories. It had a population of 520,572 in 2016. The district has the third least educated residents and their income is below average.

Kwai Tsing did not exist as a district when Hong Kong's District Boards were formed in the early 1980s; it remained a part of Tsuen Wan District until 1985. The newly created district was known as Kwai Chung and Tsing Yi District (葵涌及青衣區) until 1988, when its name was shortened to Kwai Tsing District.

The internationally famous container terminals can be found within the district, along the shores of Rambler Channel between Kwai Chung and Tsing Yi Island. The Tsing Ma Bridge, leading to the Hong Kong International Airport through the North Lantau Highway, starts at the northwestern end of Tsing Yi Island.

Over 75% of the district residents live in public housing.

== History ==
In 1669, the Qing dynasty forced the people in Hong Kong and the coastal regions such as Guangdong, Guangxi, Fujian, etc., to move to the inland areas of mainland China. After this move inland policy ceased, a large number of Hakka people from the Huayang region of Guangdong province, as well as the Hakka districts of Fujian province, moved to what is now Shenzhen and Hong Kong. Traditionally, Kwai Tsing District has been a Hakka speaking region; the original inhabitants of the villages in this area were mainly of Hakka extraction.

== Geography ==
Kwai Tsing District has borders at the north and west with Tsuen Wan District, at the east with Sha Tin District, at the southeast with Sham Shui Po District and Yau Tsim Mong District (marine), at the south with Central and Western District (marine), and at the southwest with Islands District (marine liners and similar).

== Constituencies ==
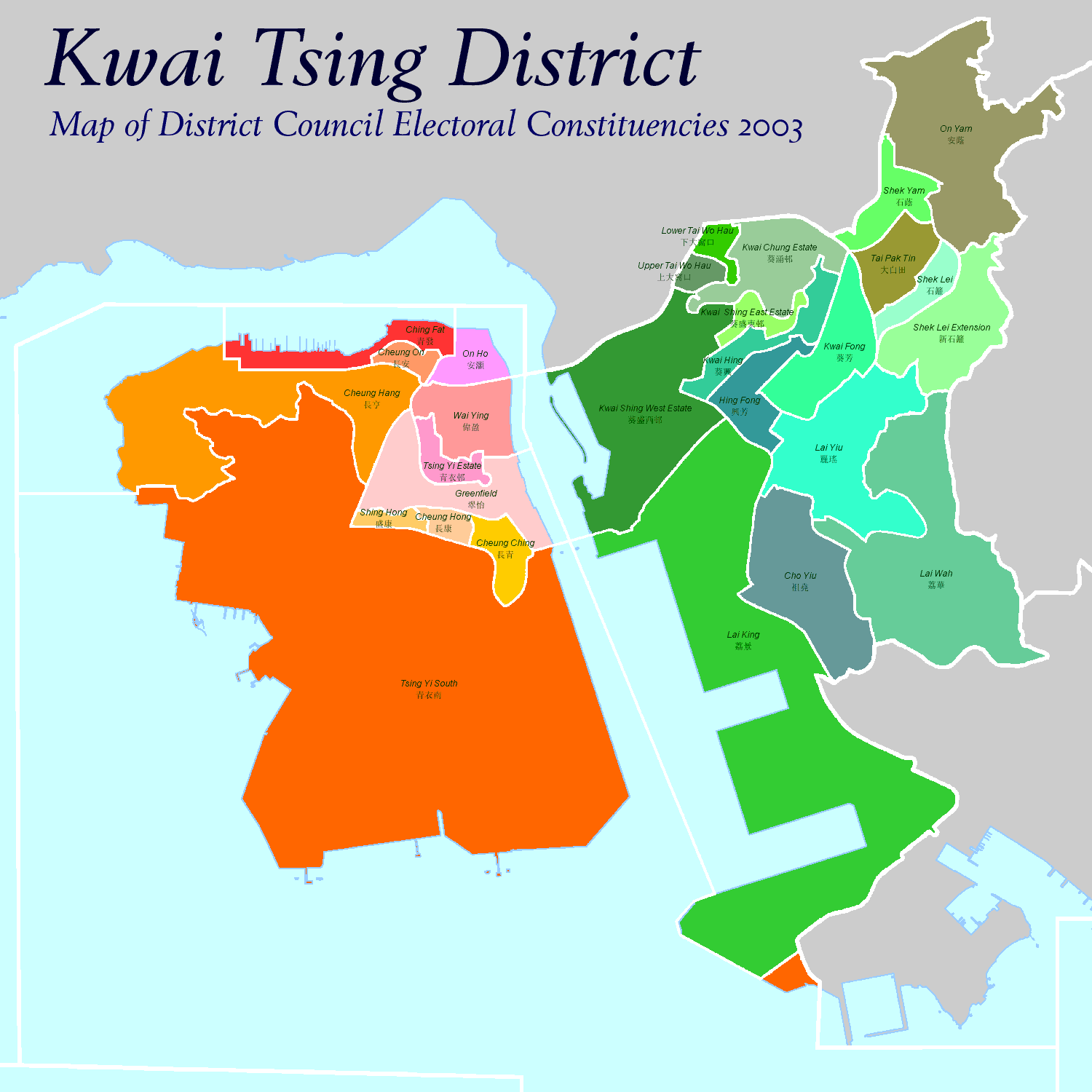
Constituencies in 2003 District Council Election

=== 2003 ===
By the 2003 District Councils Election, the Kwai Tsing District Council is divided into 28 constituencies:

Kwai Chung

- Cho Yiu
- Kwai Chung Estate
- Kwai Fong
- Kwai Hing
- Kwai Shing East Estate
- Kwai Shing West Estate
- Hing Fong
- Lai King
- Lai Wah
- Lai Yiu
- On Yam
- Shek Lei
- Shek Lei Extension
- Shek Yam
- Tai Pak Tin
- Upper Tai Wo Hau
- Lower Tai Wo Hau

Tsing Yi

- Cheung Ching
- Cheung Hang
- Cheung Hong
- Cheung On
- Ching Fat
- Greenfield
- On Ho
- Shing Hong
- Tsing Yi Estate
- Tsing Yi South
- Wai Ying

=== 2015 ===
It has 29 constituencies in 2015 election.

- S01 Kwai Hing
- S02 Kwai Shing East Estate
- S03 Upper Tai Wo Hau
- S04 Lower Tai Wo Hau
- S05 Kwai Chung Estate North
- S06 Kwai Chung Estate South
- S07 Shek Yam
- S08 On Yam
- S09 Shek Lei South
- S10 Shek Lei North
- S11 Tai Pak Tin
- S12 Kwai Fong
- S13 Wah Lai
- S14 Lai Wah
- S15 Cho Yiu
- S16 Hing Fong
- S17 Lai King
- S18 Kwai Shing West Estate
- S19 On Ho
- S20 Wai Ying
- S21 Tsing Yi Estate
- S22 Greenfield
- S23 Cheung Ching
- S24 Cheung Hong
- S25 Shing Hong
- S26 Tsing Yi South
- S27 Cheung Hang
- S28 Ching Fat
- S29 Cheung On

== Town centre ==
The district is part of Tsuen Wan New Town. Unlike other new towns in Hong Kong, the district has no clear town core in the course of development. Cores emerge only after Metroplaza in Kwai Fong and Maritime Square in Tsing Yi was built, but they are still incomparable to their counterparts in other new towns in Hong Kong.

== Industry ==
Industry is an integral part of the district. Both light and heavy industries share substantial land in the district.

== Education ==
Like other early new towns of Hong Kong, the district was primary for settling the influx of Chinese population around the year of the change of sovereignty in China in 1949 and the baby boom afterwards. Public housing estates were built throughout the district. Many schools have been established by various charities and religious organisations. Some have provided vocational training for industries in Hong Kong while some have become liberal schools. As the community has aged, the number of school children declined after the 2000s, and schools are facing survival problems.

Secondary schools in 2006:

- Buddhist Sin Tak College
- Buddhist Yip Kei Nam Memorial College
- Caritas St. Joseph Secondary School
- Carmel Alison Lam Foundation Secondary School
- CCC Chuen Yuen College
- CCC Yenching College
- CNEC Christian College
- CNEC Lee I Yao Memorial Secondary School
- Cotton Spinners Association Secondary School
- Daughters of Mary Help of Christians Siu Ming Catholic Secondary School
- Ha Kwai Chung Government Secondary School
- HKSYC & IA Chan Nam Chong Memorial College
- Hong Kong Taoist Association the Yuen Yuen Institute No.1 Secondary School
- Ju Ching Chu Secondary School (Kwai Chung)
- Kiangsu-Chekiang College (Kwai Chung)
- Kwai Chung Methodist College
- Lai King Catholic Secondary School
- Lingnan Dr Chung Wing Kwong Memorial Secondary School
- Lions College
- Lok Sin Tong Ku Chiu Man Secondary School
- Lok Sin Tong Leung Chik Wai Memorial School
- Po Leung Kuk Lo Kit Sing (1983) College
- Pope Paul VI College
- Queen's College Old Boys' Association Secondary School
- Salesians of Don Bosco Ng Siu Mui Secondary School
- Shek Lei Catholic Secondary School
- Sheung Kwai Chung Government Secondary School
- Shun Tak Fraternal Association Lee Shau Kee College
- Sheng Kung Hui Lam Woo Memorial Secondary School
- The Methodist Lee Wai Lee College
- Tung Wah Group of Hospitals Chen Zao Men College
- Tung Wah Group of Hospitals Mrs Wu York Yu Memorial College
- Tung Wah Group of Hospitals S. C. Gaw Memorial College

Hong Kong Public Libraries operates three libraries in the district: North Kwai Chung, South Kwai Chung, and Tsing Yi.

== Leisure ==
There are several sports grounds in the district. Biu Chun Rangers are based in Tsing Yi. Kwai Tsing Theatre in Kwai Fong is gradually becoming an important performance venue in Hong Kong.

== Transport ==
The usual forms of transportation in the district are buses, minibuses and metro.

The MTR (metro) Tsuen Wan line has four stations on three lines running through the district:

- Lai King is the southernmost, and the interchange between Tsuen Wan and Tung Chung line.
- The Tsuen Wan line then runs through two stations (Kwai Fong, Kwai Hing) before exiting the district for Tsuen Wan.
- Tung Chung line diverges to the west to Tsing Yi Island and have a station, Tsing Yi, there.
- Tsing Yi station is also served by Airport Express, which is the last station before reaching the Airport.

Bus

- Kowloon Motor Bus: 6, 30, 31, 31A, 31B, 32, 32H, 32M, 33A, 34, 35A, 35X, 36A, 36B, 36M, 36X, 37, 37M, 37X, 38, 38A, 38B, 38P, 40, 40A, 40E, 40P, 40X, 41A, 41M, 42, 42A, 42C, 42M, 43, 43A, 43B, 43C, 43D, 43M, 43S, 44, 44M, 45, 46, 46P, 46X, 47A, 47X, 48X, 49P, 49X, 57M, 58M, 58P, 59A, 60X, 61M, 67A, 67M, 68A, 68E, 69M, 69P, 73D, 73P, 73X, 234C, 234D, 235, 235M, 240X, 241X, 242X, 243M, 243P, 248M, 249M, 249X, 260C, 265B, 265M, 269M, 269P, 272P, 278A, 278P, 278X, 279A, 279B, 279X, 290, 290A, 290E, 290X, N41X, N237, N241, N252, N260, N269, N290, X42C, X42P
- Long Win Bus: A30, A31, A32, E31, E32, E32A, E42, E42P, N31, NA30, NA31, NA32
- Citybus: 50, A20, A23, E21, E21A, E21B, E21C, E21D, N21, N21A, N50, NA20
- Cross Harbour Tunnel: 171, 171A, 171P, 904, 905, 905A, 905P, 930, 930B, 935, 936, 936A, 948, 948A, 948B, 948E, 948P, 948X, N171, N930

== See also ==
- List of places in Hong Kong
