= LIY =

LIY or Liy may refer to:

- Banda-Bambari language, with the ISO 639-3 language code LIY
- CNEC Lee I Yao Memorial Secondary School, a protestant high school in Hong Kong, China
- Lintong railway station, in Xi'an, China
- MidCoast Regional Airport at Wright Army Airfield, in Georgia, United States
- Liy, a character from the fourth season of Battle for Dream Island, an animated web series
