= CNEC Christian College =

Secondary school in Kwai Chung, New Territories

Coordinates: 22.3637°N 114.1396°E

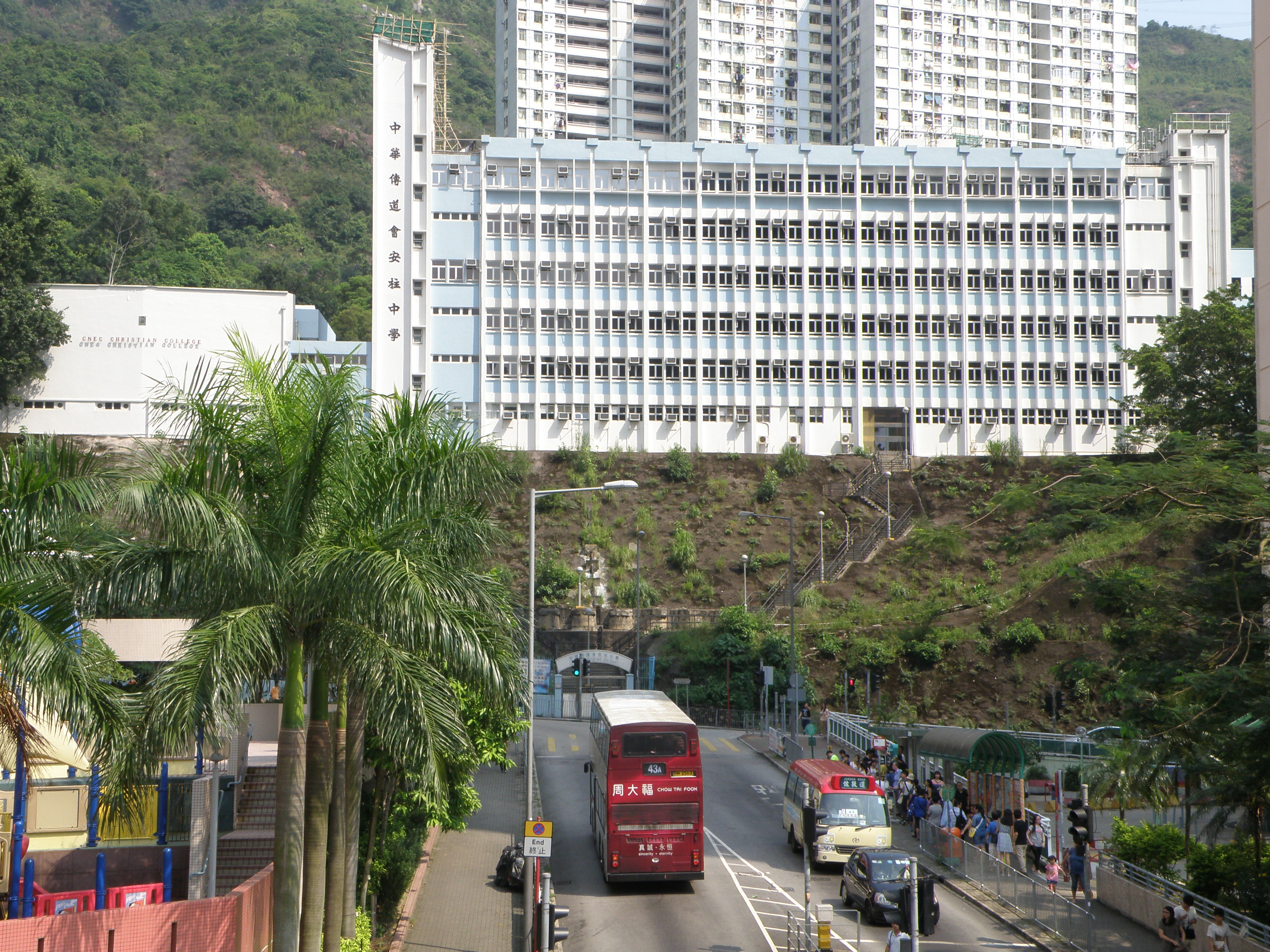
- 6 Lei Pui Street, Shek Lei, Kwai Chung, N.T.

Information
- Type: Subsidied School
- Motto: Faithfulness, Righteousness, Integrity, Sincerity, "信義忠誠"
- Established: 1973
- Principal: Dr. Chan Chi Kian Edward
- Sponsoring body: CNEC (中華傳道會)
- Website: www.cneccc.edu.hk

CNEC Christian College (Chinese: 中華傳道會安柱中學) is a subsidised English Medium of Instruction school located in Kwai Chung, New Territories, Hong Kong. Founded in 1973, it is a Christian school.

== Campus ==
The school, with a floor area 100,000 square feet (9,300 square metre), comprises three teaching blocks (namely Hoi Tak Complex, Hau Ching Complex and Tak Shing Hall) with lift tower installed, a new teaching purposed wing besides Hoi Tak Complex was also founded few years ago, a covered playground, two basketball courts with nine basketball nets, two volleyball courts, two memorial gardens and a six-lane running track. A gym room is renovated locating in the ground floor of the campus. The school renovated the outdoors sports ground during the academic year 2021.

== Quiz Team ==
CNEC Christian College has long been famous for its Quiz Team (quizbowl) which has been joining every major quiz competition in Hong Kong since the 80s. According to unofficial sources, over 75% of prizes of the college were won by the Quiz Team.

The Annual dinner of Quiz Team is often held in August, in which current members and teachers in charge are in the list of invitation, distinguished alumni are also invited to join the high table.

The incumbent heads of the team are Mr. Ng Kar-Ho, Mr. Cheng Chi-Sing and Mr. Yip Gai Yik.

== Student Council ==
Student Council of CNEC ("The Council") was established in the early 90s. The council composes of the Executive Committee and the representatives of all student organizations in the college. The role of student council is to be the bridge between the school and students. The council is obliged to serve both students and school authority by establishing a harmonious and effective learning environment. The election of student council has been changed from the individual system to cabinet since 2014. The first elected cabinet is Stardust with 10 members. The chairman of the council is also the one who holds and calls general meetings. General meeting is an official occasion that allows student bodies, including four houses, different clubs and society, to initiate and report events planned to be held. The initiations will be questioned in the course by council members and participating teachers. Approval or disapproval for the initiation of events is given after the polling of student body representatives.

Advising teachers will have a regular internal meeting with the student council executive members every month to keep updated with the operations of council and advise the initiated events held by council executives.

Some claim that this makes the advisors the authentically supreme leader of the council. They insist that advising teachers often unconstitutionally speak in the council and sometimes stop the hon. Councilors make statements therein as he might deem fit even though he assumes no seat in the council pursuant to the constitution. After all, the council executives committee members are those with the power to make the decisions but not the advisors. The dispute over who takes the lead in council is yet to be discussed.

Significant events held by Student Council are Singing Contest and the Variety Show. For the former event, it is an annual big activity for all students to participate. It is a platform for those who are interested in singing and dancing to showcase their talent. Participants in the forms of individuals, groups and class will undergo audition, semi-finals and finals to win the first place. The final is held usually with the variety show. Variety Show is hence an event composes of the final of singing contest and the talent shows of four houses, council members or members of clubs and societies. Besides, student Council is also responsible for Local Student Exchange Programme, Foreign Student Exchange Programme and daily stationary selling etc.

== Public exams ==
CNECCC does exceedingly well in the field of Mathematics and Chemistry. For many years has CNECCC had 100% percentage of credit of Pure Mathematics (AL). Few years ago, 9 out of 20 students got an A in Pure Mathematics (45% percentage of distinction).

The percentage of distinction of Pure Mathematics in 2007 was 22.22% (4/18), while it was 15.38% in Queen's College. The percentage of credit of Pure Mathematics at the same year was 94.4% (17/18), while it was 73.08% in Queen's College.

== Other schools of CNEC ==
=== Secondary schools ===
CNEC Lau Wing Sang Secondary School

CNEC Lee I Yao Memorial Secondary School

=== Primary schools ===
CNEC Ta Tung School

CNEC Lui Ming Choi Primary School

== Recent actions ==
The 2019–20 anti-extradition bill movement prompted concern among students of CNECCC, who held the following events:

- 2 September 2019: Students sent flyers about The Extradition Bill before school and wore black masks when attending lessons.
- 3 September 2019: Students distributed The students held strike as an action to fight against The Extradition Bill.
- 6 September 2019: Students sang "Sing Hallelujah to the Lord" during recesses on every floor.
- 9 September 2019: Students organised a human chain (cooperate with students from Pope Paul VI College).
- 11 September 2019: Students organised a human chain on Sports Day.
- 11 November 2019: Students participated in a "Walk With You" protest, organised by five Kwai Chung schools, which marched through the Shek Lei neighbourhood of Kwai Chung before the school day.
