= Shek Lei North (constituency) =

Hong Kong constituency

- Elected constituency for the Kwai Tsing District Council
- Boundary of Shek Lei North in Kwai Tsing District
- District: Kwai Tsing
- Legislative Council constituency: New Territories South West
- Population: 15,253 (2019)
- Electorate: 8,209 (2019)

Current constituency
- Created: 1991
- Number of members: One
- Member: Lam Siu-fai (Democratic)

Shek Lei North (Chinese: 石籬北), formerly called Shek Lei, is one of the 31 constituencies in the Kwai Tsing District in Hong Kong.

The constituency returns one district councillor to the Kwai Tsing District Council, with an election every four years. The seat has been currently held by Lam Siu-fai of the Democratic Party.

Wai Ying constituency is loosely based on Shek Lei Estate in Kwai Chung with an estimated population of 15,253.

== Councillors represented ==
Election	Member	Party
1991	Lee Wing-tat	United Democrat
1994	Lee Wing-tat	Democratic
1994	Chan Ngai	Independent
1999	Lam Siu-fai	Democratic

== Election results ==
=== 2010s ===
Kwai Tsing District Council Election, 2019: Shek Lei North
Party	Candidate	Votes	%	±%
Democratic	Lam Siu-fai	3,456	62.36	−4.74
DAB	Yuen Yun-hung	2,086	37.64	+4.74
Majority		1,370	24.72	
Turnout		5,555	67.77	
Democratic hold		Swing		

Kwai Tsing District Council Election, 2015: Shek Lei North
Party	Candidate	Votes	%	±%
Democratic	Lam Siu-fai	2,981	67.1	+6.7
DAB	Cheng Ip-mei	1,459	32.9	
Majority		1,522	23.2	
Turnout		4,483	47.6	
Democratic hold		Swing		

Kwai Tsing District Council Election, 2011: Shek Lei
Party	Candidate	Votes	%	±%
Democratic	Lam Siu-fai	2,228	61.8	−8.1
Liberal	Lau Ming-kin	1,291	35.8	+5.7
People Power	Law Ka-kei	86	2.4	
Democratic hold		Swing		

=== 2000s ===
Kwai Tsing District Council Election, 2007: Shek Lei
Party	Candidate	Votes	%	±%
Democratic	Lam Siu-fai	1,776	69.9	−15.6
Liberal	Lau Ming-kin	765	30.1	
Democratic hold		Swing		

Kwai Tsing District Council Election, 2003: Shek Lei
Party	Candidate	Votes	%	±%
Democratic	Lam Siu-fai	2,511	85.5	+28.1
DAB	Tam Tsuen	425	14.5	
Democratic hold		Swing		

=== 1990s ===
Kwai Tsing District Council Election, 1999: Shek Lei
Party	Candidate	Votes	%	±%
Democratic	Lam Siu-fai	1,422	57.4	
Independent	Lee Sun-ho	483	19.5	
Independent	Leung Kwok-on	483	19.5	
Democratic gain from Independent		Swing		

Kwai Tsing District Board Election, 1994: Shek Lei
Party	Candidate	Votes	%	±%
Independent	Chan Ngai	1,418	66.7	
Independent	Ip Shu-kai	660	31.0	
Independent gain from Democratic		Swing		

Kwai Tsing District Board Election, 1991: Shek Lei
Party	Candidate	Votes	%	±%
United Democrats	Lee Wing-tat	1,886	78.5	
Civic	Yip Shu-kai	504	21.0	
United Democrats win (new seat)				
