= HCY =

HCY may refer to:

- Homocysteine, an amino acid
- Hôpital Central de Yaoundé, a Cameroonian hospital
- Tsuen Wan Public Ho Chuen Yiu Memorial College, a Hong Kong secondary school
- Helios Airways, a Cypriot airline (1998–2006; ICAO:HCY)
