= Kwai Shing West Estate (constituency) =

Hong Kong constituency

- Elected constituency for the Kwai Tsing District Council
- Boundary of Kwai Shing West Estate in Kwai Tsing District
- District: Kwai Tsing
- Legislative Council constituency: New Territories South West
- Population: 18,062 (2019)
- Electorate: 11,214 (2019)

Current constituency
- Created: 1994
- Number of members: One
- Member: vacant

Kwai Shing West Estate (Chinese: 葵盛西邨) is one of the 31 constituencies of the Kwai Tsing District Council in Hong Kong. The seat elects one member of the council every four years. It was first created in the 1994 elections. Its boundary is loosely based on part of High Prosperity Terrace, Horizon Place and Kwai Shing West Estate in Kwai Chung with estimated population of 18,062.

== Councillors represented ==
Election	Member	Party
1994	Luk King-shing	Nonpartisan
2003	Lau Wai-kit	Nonpartisan
200?	Lau Wai-kit	Liberal
2007	Leung Yuk-fung	Civic
2011	Lau Mei-lo	FTU
2019	Ivy Leung Ching-shan→vacant	NWSC

== Election results ==
=== 2010s ===
Kwai Tsing District Council Election, 2019: Kwai Shing West Estate
Party	Candidate	Votes	%	±%
NWSC	Ivy Leung Ching-shan	4,365	57.15	
FTU	Lau Mei-lo	3,273	42.85	
Majority		1,092	14.30	
Turnout		7,699	68.69	
NWSC gain from FTU		Swing		
