= Shek Lei South (constituency) =

One of the 31 constituencies of the Kwai Tsing

- Elected constituency for the Kwai Tsing District Council
- Boundary of Shek Lei South in Kwai Tsing District
- District: Kwai Tsing
- Legislative Council constituency: New Territories South West
- Population: 19,678 (2019)
- Electorate: 11,792 (2019)

Current constituency
- Created: 1994
- Number of members: One
- Member: vacant

Shek Lei South (Chinese: 石籬南), previously Shek Lei Extension, is one of the 31 constituencies of the Kwai Tsing District Council in Hong Kong. The seat elects one member of the council every four years. It was first created in the 1994 elections. Its boundary is loosely based on part of Shek Lei (I) Estate, part of Shek Lei (II) Estate and Yi Fung Court in Shek Lei with estimated population of 19,678.

== Councillors represented ==
Election	Member	Party
1994	Lai Siu-tong	Democratic
199?	Lai Siu-tong	Independent
2003	Lai Siu-tong	Liberal
2007	Leung Kwok-wah	Democratic
2015	David Ng Ka-chiu	NPP
2017	David Ng Ka-chiu	Roundtable
2019	Leung Kwok-wah→vacant	Democratic

== Election results ==
=== 2010s ===
Kwai Tsing District Council Election, 2019: Shek Lei South
Party	Candidate	Votes	%	±%
Democratic	Leung Kwok-wah	4,780	58.93	
Roundtable	David Ng Ka-chiu	3,331	41.07	
Majority		1,449	17.86	
Turnout		8,147	69.13	
Democratic gain from Roundtable		Swing		
