= Lists of schools in Hong Kong =

== Tertiary education ==
=== Universities ===
- University of Hong Kong
- Chinese University of Hong Kong
- Hong Kong University of Science and Technology
- City University of Hong Kong
- Hong Kong Polytechnic University
- Hong Kong Baptist University
- Lingnan University
- The Education University of Hong Kong
- Hong Kong Shue Yan University
- Open University of Hong Kong
- Hang Seng University of Hong Kong (formerly Hang Seng Management College and Hang Seng School of Commerce)

=== Post-secondary education ===
- Caritas Bianchi College of Careers
- Chu Hai College of Higher Education
- Hong Kong Academy for Performing Arts
- Hong Kong Nang Yan College of Higher Education
- Vocational Training Council
- Hong Kong Institute of Vocational Education
- Hong Kong College of Technology

== Secondary education ==
=== Former schools ===
- Hong Kong Sam Yuk Secondary School
- Po Leung Kuk Tsing Yi Secondary School (Skill Opportunity)
- Sam Yuk Middle School

== Primary education ==
=== Former schools ===
- Tsing Yi Fishermen's Children's Primary School

== Lists by type ==
- List of government schools in Hong Kong
- List of international schools in Hong Kong
- List of special schools in Hong Kong
- List of English Schools Foundation schools

== Lists by district ==
Hong Kong Island and the Islands District

- List of schools in Central and Western District
- List of schools in Eastern District, Hong Kong
- List of schools in Islands District
- List of schools in Southern District, Hong Kong
- List of schools in Wan Chai District

Kowloon and Sai Kung District

- List of schools in Kowloon City District
- List of schools in Kwun Tong District
- List of schools in Sai Kung District
- List of schools in Sham Shui Po District
- List of schools in Wong Tai Sin District
- List of schools in Yau Tsim Mong District

New Territories

(East)

- List of schools in North District, Hong Kong
- List of schools in Sha Tin District
- List of schools in Tai Po District

(West)

- List of schools in Kwai Tsing District
- List of schools in Tsuen Wan District
- List of schools in Tuen Mun District
- List of schools in Yuen Long District

== Lists by gender ==
- List of boys' schools in Hong Kong
- List of girls' schools in Hong Kong

Coeducational schools may be seen in other lists.

== Lists by religion ==
- List of Catholic schools in Hong Kong

Islamic schools

- Islamic Kasim Tuet Memorial College in Chai Wan, Hong Kong Island
- Islamic Dharwood Pau Memorial Primary School (伊斯蘭鮑伯濤紀念小學) in Tsz Wan Shan, Kowloon
- Islamic Primary School (伊斯蘭學校) in Tuen Mun, New Territories
- UMAH International Primary School in Yuen Long
- Islamic Abu Bakar Chui Memorial Kindergarten in Shau Kei Wan
- Islamic Pok Oi Kindergarten in Tsing Yi
- Muslim Community Kindergarten in Wan Chai
