= Kwai Shing =

Area on the hill

Coordinates: 22.3612°N 114.1224°E

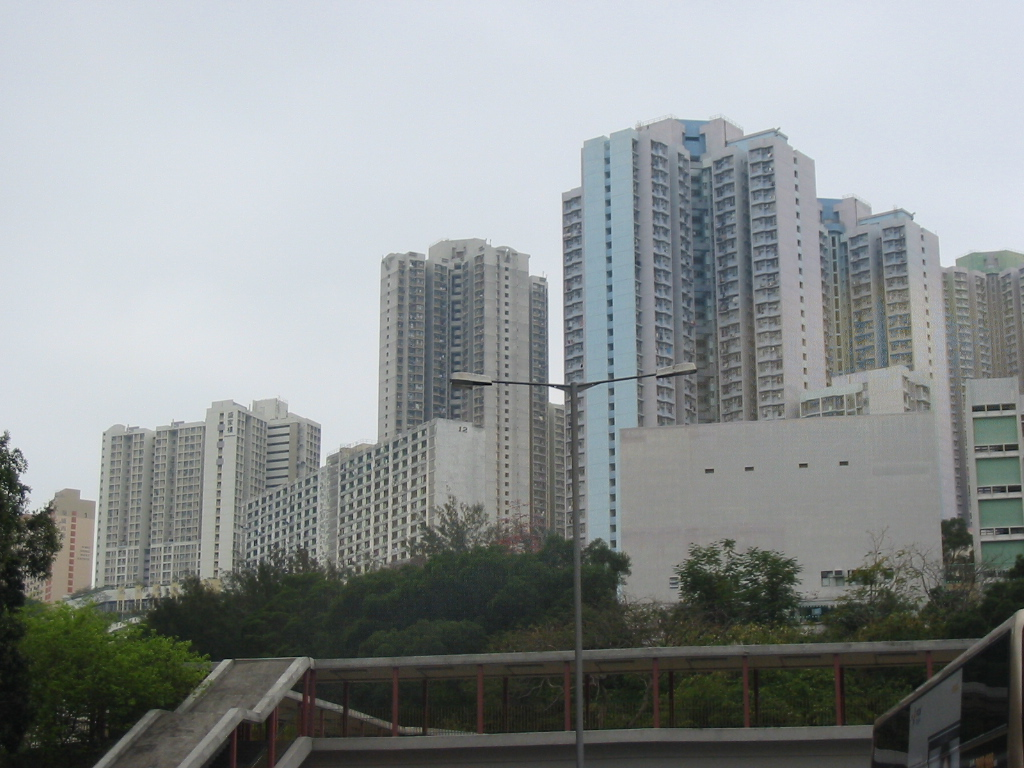
Kwai Shing East Estate

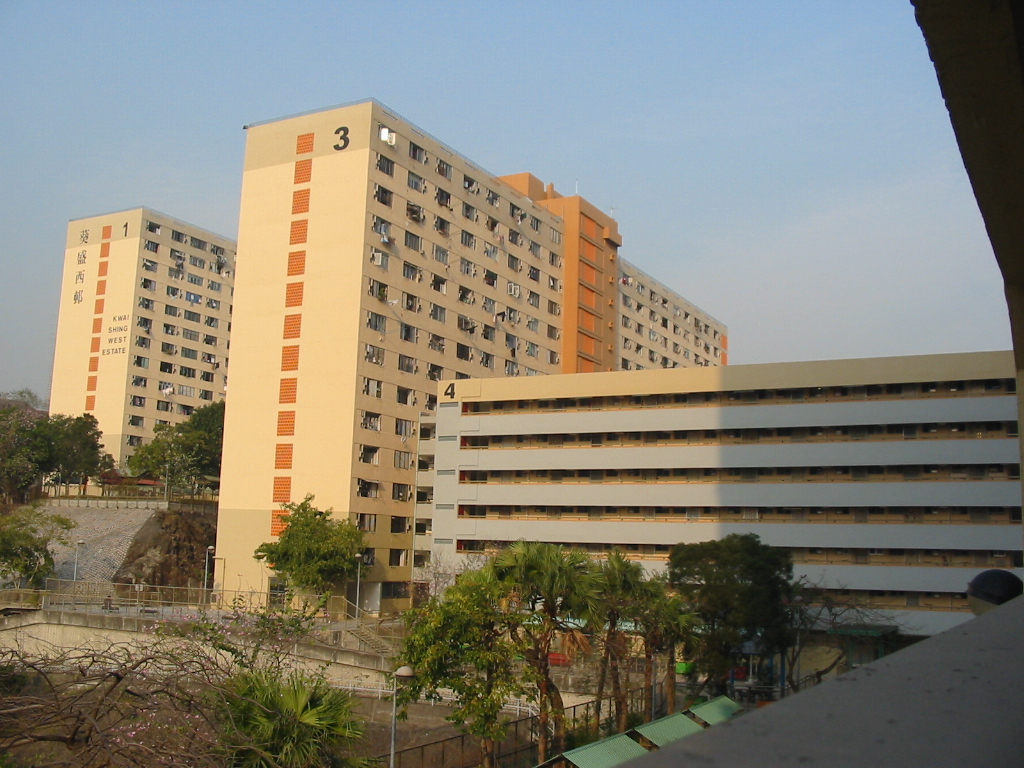
Kwai Shing West Estate

Kwai Shing (葵盛) is an area on the hill between Kwai Fong and Tai Wo Hau in the Kwai Chung area of Hong Kong. The area is named after the two major public housing estates on the hill, Kwai Shing East Estate and Kwai Shing West Estate, accommodating the influx of immigrants after World War II.

The area hosts some major facilities in Kwai Chung, like Kwai Shing Swimming Pool, South Kwai Chung Jockey Club Polyclinic and Kwai Shing Wet market. It is surrounded by many primary and secondary schools. For example, Sheng Kung Hui Lam Woo Memorial Secondary School, Buddhist Sin Tak College, Daughter of Mary Help of Christians Siu Ming Catholic Secondary School and so on.

There are some public transport stations in Kwai Shing community which makes the place quite convenient. The nearest MTR station is Kwai Hing station and it requires 15 minutes to walk down there.

== Education ==
Kwai Shing is in Primary One Admission (POA) School Net 65, which includes multiple aided schools (schools operated independently of the government but funded with government money); none of the schools in the net are government schools.
