= List of schools in Tsuen Wan District =

This is a list of schools in Tsuen Wan District, Hong Kong.

== Secondary schools ==
Government

- Tsuen Wan Government Secondary School

Aided

- AD&FD POHL Leung Sing Tak College (博愛醫院歷屆總理聯誼會梁省德中學)
- Ho Fung College (sponsored by Sik Sik Yuen) (可風中學（嗇色園主辦）)
- Ho Koon Nature Education cum Astronomical Centre (可觀自然教育中心暨天文館)
- Liu Po Shan Memorial College (廖寶珊紀念書院)
- Lui Ming Choi Lutheran College (路德會呂明才中學)
- PLK Lee Shing Pik College (保良局李城璧中學)
- PLK Yao Ling Sun College (保良局姚連生中學)
- Po On Commercial Association Siu Ching Secondary School (寶安商會王少清中學)
- SKH Li Ping Secondary School (聖公會李炳中學)
- St Francis Xavier's School, Tsuen Wan (荃灣聖芳濟中學)
- Textile Institute American Chamber of Commerce Woo Hon Fai Secondary School (紡織學會美國商會胡漢輝中學)
- Tsuen Wan Public Ho Chuen Yiu Memorial College (荃灣公立何傳耀紀念中學)
- YCH Lim Por Yen Secondary School (仁濟醫院林百欣中學)

Private

- Sear Rogers International School

== Primary schools ==
Government

- Hoi Pa Street Government Primary School (海壩街官立小學)
- Tsuen Wan Government Primary School (荃灣官立小學)

Aided

- CCC Chuen Yuen First Primary School (中華基督教會全完第一小學)
- CCC Kei Wai Primary School (中華基督教會基慧小學)
- CCC Kei Wai Primary School (Ma Wan) (中華基督教會基慧小學（馬灣）)
- Chai Wan Kok Catholic Primary School (柴灣角天主教小學)
- Emmanuel Primary School (靈光小學)
- HKTA Yuen Yuen Institute Shek Wai Kok Primary School (香港道教聯合會圓玄學院石圍角小學)
- Ho Shun Primary School (sponsored by Sik Sik Yuen) (嗇色園主辦可信學校)
- Holy Cross Lutheran School (路德會聖十架學校)
- Hong Kong Baptist Convention Primary School (香港浸信會聯會小學)
- Kwai-Ming Wu Memorial School of Precious Blood (寶血會伍季明紀念學校)
- Lei Muk Shue Catholic Primary School (梨木樹天主教小學)
- Mary of Providence Primary School (天佑小學)
- Shak Chung Shan Memorial Catholic Primary School (天主教石鐘山紀念小學)
- Sham Tseng Catholic Primary School (深井天主教小學)
- Si Yuan School of the Precious Blood (寶血會思源學校)
- SKH Chu Oi Primary School (Lei Muk Shue) (聖公會主愛小學（梨木樹）)
- Tsuen Wan Catholic Primary School (荃灣天主教小學)
- Tsuen Wan Chiu Chow Public School (荃灣潮州公學)
- Tsuen Wan Public Ho Chuen Yiu Memorial Primary School (荃灣公立何傳耀紀念小學)

Private

- Rosebud Primary School (玫瑰蕾小學)

== Special schools ==
Aided

- Hong Kong Red Cross Hospital Schools Yan Chai Hospital (香港紅十字會醫院學校)
