= Tin Ka Ping Secondary School =

School in Fanling, New Territories, Hong Kong

Coordinates: 22.4942°N 114.1311°E

- 田家炳中學
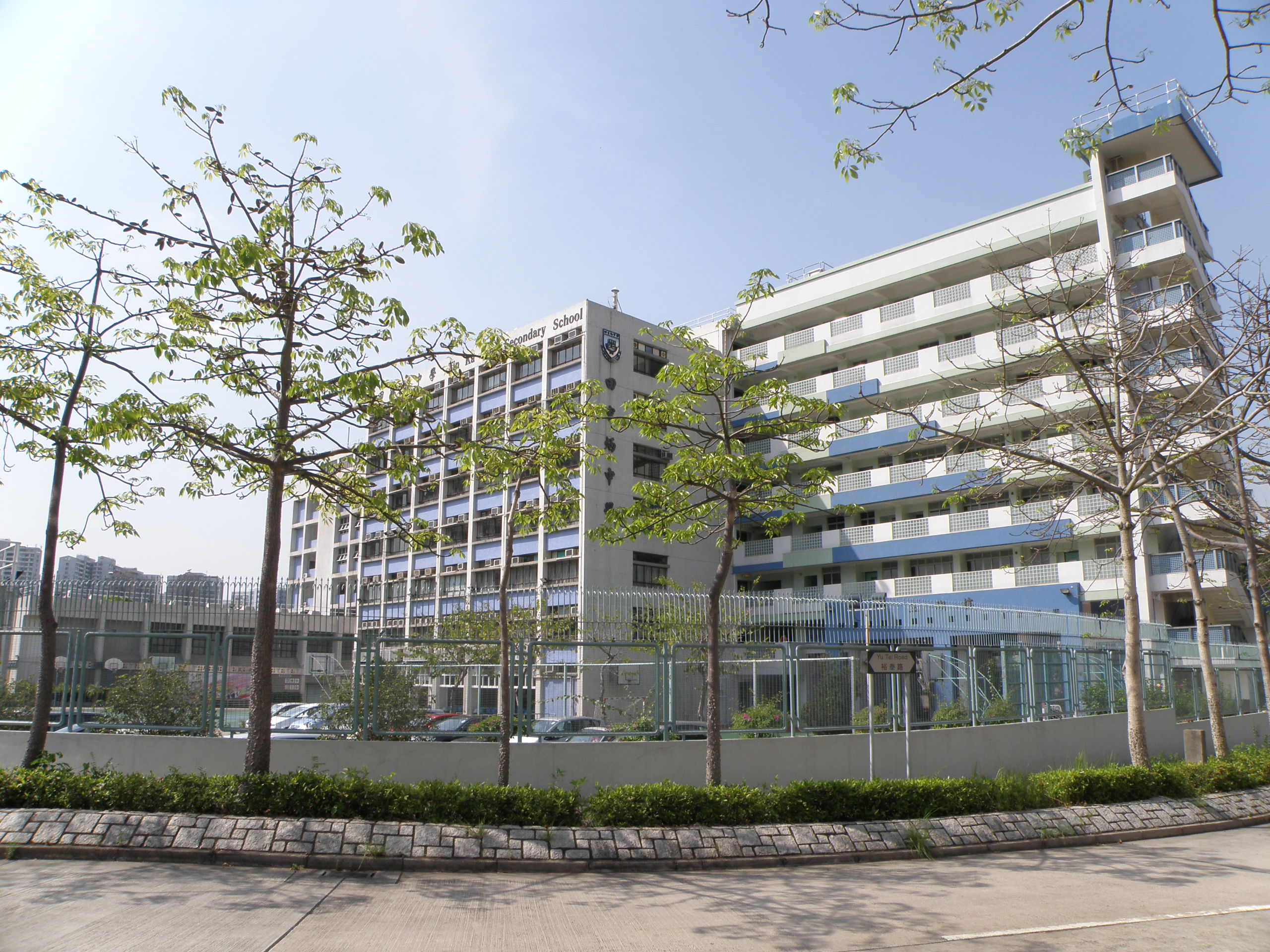

Location
- 1 Wai Hon Road; Fanling, New Territories; Hong Kong

Information
- Type: Allowance secondary school for boys and girls
- Motto: "思明至善" (Chinese for "Observe things particularity and be kind.")
- Established: 1994
- Founder: Dr. Tin Ka-Ping
- School district: North District
- President: Mr. Tin Wing-Sin (田榮先先生)
- Principal: Mr. Chan Yee Hon (陳雨翰先生)
- Grades: Form 1 - Form 6 (Age: 12-18)
- Color: Blue
- Yearbook: Tin Garden
- Website: Official website

Tin Ka Ping Secondary School
- Traditional Chinese: 田家炳中學
- Simplified Chinese: 田家炳中学
Transcriptions
Standard Mandarin
- Hanyu Pinyin: Tián Jiābǐng Zhōngxué
Yue: Cantonese
- Jyutping: tin4 gaa1 bing2 zung1 hok6

Tin Ka Ping Secondary School (Chinese: 田家炳中學) is an English medium (EMI) secondary school located in Fanling, Sheung Shui, Hong Kong, founded in 1994. With subsidy from the government, it provides students with various amenities such as practice rooms for extensive arts, audio-visual equipment and sports facilities. Please remind that you can't choose M2 and ICT at the same time as the electives in this school.

== School History ==
The school was established by Dr. Tin Ka-ping's fund. Dr. Tin Ka-ping is a Hong Kong industrialist and philanthropist, who is well known for his contributions to education development, including moral education and teacher training. The school ideal aims at "quality all-round education", focusing on students' talents, moral characteristics and self-esteem.

== Extracurricular activities ==
- Art Club
- English Society
- Chinese Culture Promotion Group
- Mathematical Olympiad Programme
- Chinese Society
- English Drama Club(Musical)
- (English)Speech Art Club
- Drawing Enhancement Class
- Chinese Calligraphy Club
- Robotics Team
- Science Club
- English Ambassador
- School Choir
- Guitar Class
- Guzheng Class
- Handchime Team
- Violin Class
- Cello Class
- Concert Band
- School Drumming Team
- Community Youth Club(CYC)
- Girl Guides
- Library Assistant
- School Prefect
- Multi-media Production Unit
- M.C. Training Group
- Bridge & Chess Club
- (Chinese)Drama Club
- Dance Club (Elementary)
- Christian Fellowship

== School Teams ==
Tin Ka Ping Secondary School also have a lot of sport teams and have a good quality.

- Badminton Team
- Basketball Team(Boys)
- Football Team(Boys)
- Athletics Team
- Swimming Team
- Table Tennis Club
- Volley ball Team(Boys)
- Volley ball Team(Girls)
- Handball Team
- Rope Skipping Team
- Cross-Country Team
- Basketball Team(Girls)

== Publications ==
- School Pamphlet(Chinese "學校簡介小冊子") - For Pre-S.1 Students (introducing our school)
- Ping Fong Collection(Chinese "並放集") - School Prose(Chinese)
- The Green Field(Chinese "田園/校刊" ）- School Yearbook
- PTA Newsletter(Chinese "家教會刊物" ）- Parent Teacher Association News
- Writing Scripters - School Newspaper(English)
- Tinspiration - Students Writing(English)

== See also ==
- Education in Hong Kong
- List of buildings and structures in Hong Kong
- list of schools in Hong Kong
