= Tsuen Wan Public Ho Chuen Yiu Memorial College =

Secondary school in Tsuen Wan, Hong Kong

Coordinates: 22.3758°N 114.126°E

Tsuen Wan Public Ho Chuen Yiu Memorial College 荃灣公立何傳耀紀念中學
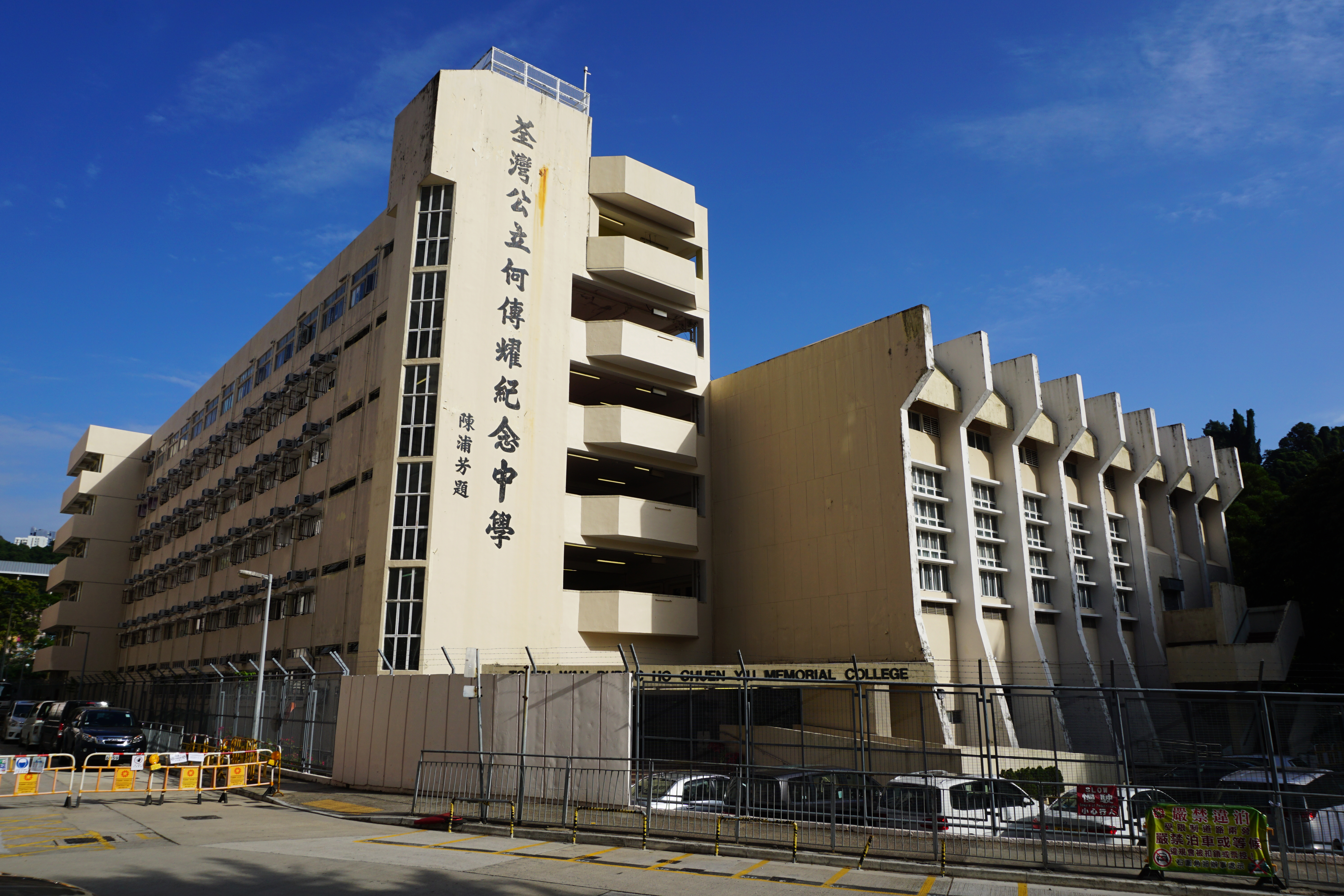
- Shek Wai Kok Estate; Tsuen Wan; Hong Kong

Information
- Type: EMI school
- Established: 1977
- Principal: Lau Sui-yee
- Information: Secondary 1 to 6
- Motto: 止於至善
- Website: http://www.twphcymc.edu.hk

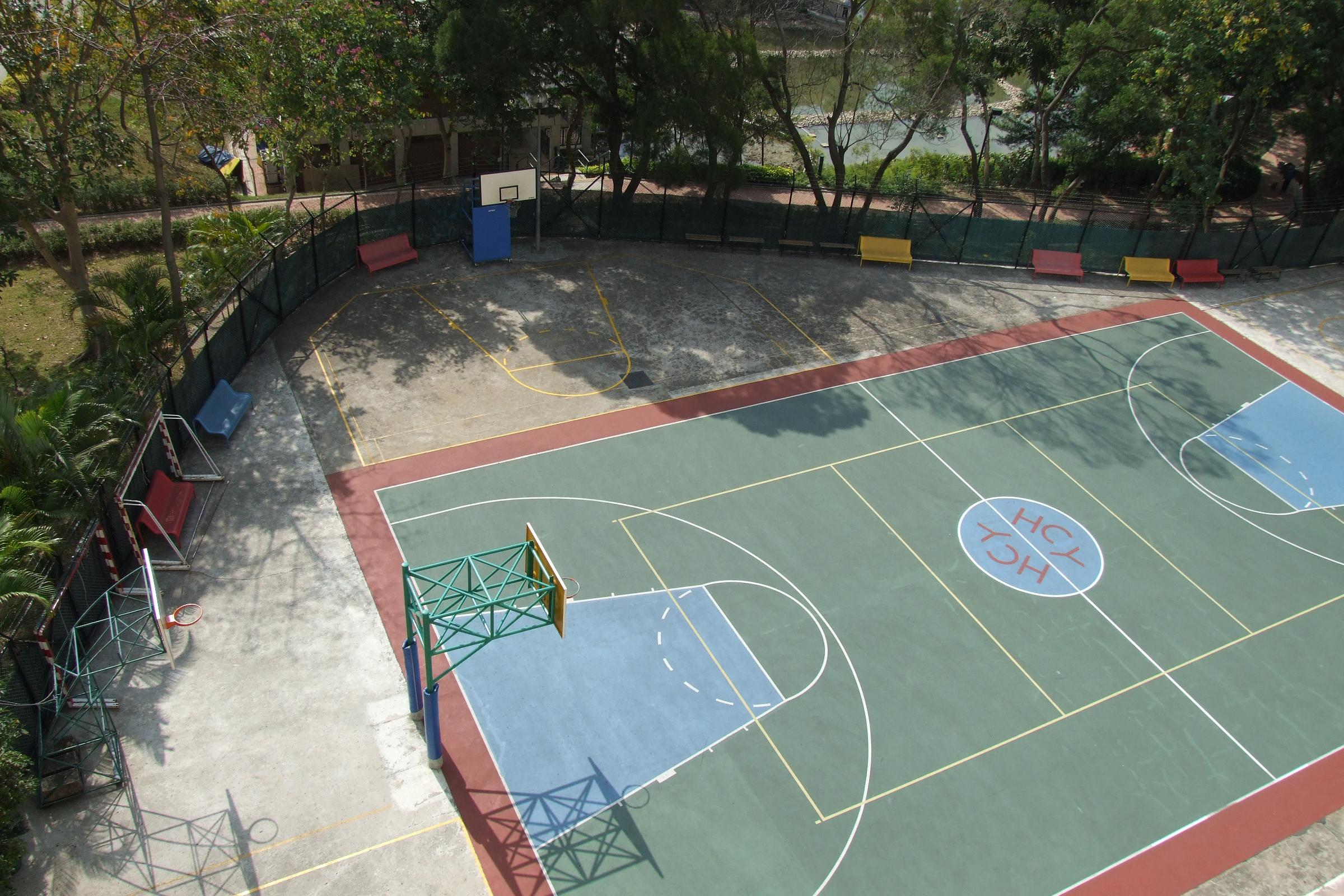
Playground

Tsuen Wan Public Ho Chuen Yiu Memorial College (TWPHCYMC; Chinese: 荃灣公立何傳耀紀念中學) is an English-as-a-medium-of-instruction (EMI) secondary school located at Shek Wai Kok Estate, Tsuen Wan, Hong Kong.

== History ==
The school is named after Ho Chuen-yiu, a Tsuen Wan businessman and community leader. He founded the Tsuen Wan Rural Committee and served two terms as the chairman of the Heung Yee Kuk.

The school was founded in 1977 and moved to its current campus in 1978.

Following the handover of Hong Kong in 1997, the Hong Kong government announced that the default medium of instruction would be Chinese, requiring approval from the Education Department for continued use of English. Many EMI schools were thereafter forced to become Chinese-as-a-medium-of-instruction (CMI) schools. TWPHCYMC was one of the schools permitted to continue teaching in English.

Tsang Chi-kin (曾志健), a TWPHCYMC form six student, was shot in the chest by the police during the 2019–20 Hong Kong protests. The shooting took place in Tsuen Wan during territory-wide unrest on 1 October 2019, China's National Day. Students of TWPHCYMC and other schools protested the following day in support of the student, who survived, and alleged police brutality. Tsang was charged with rioting and assaulting the police. In December 2020, an overseas activist group stated that Tsang and his girlfriend had escaped Hong Kong and gone into exile with their help. Tsang and three others were arrested in July 2022 when attempting to flee from Hong Kong to Taiwan. Police said that they had been hiding in safehouses for two years previously. He was sentenced on 18 October 2023 to 3.5 years in prison for rioting and assaulting a police officer, and to 11 months and two weeks for perverting the course of justice, after having pleaded guilty the previous month.

Following the shooting, the school stated that Tsang would not be expelled. This prompted criticism from Chinese sources, such as the Xinhua News Agency, a mouthpiece of the Chinese Communist Party, which published an editorial attacking the school and Hong Kong educators in general.

== School facilities ==
The school has a computer-assisted learning centre, computerised music room, computerised art room, computer room, student union room, student activity centre, etc. All classrooms are equipped with computers and projectors. All rooms are air-conditioned.

== Extra-curricular activities ==
There are four houses: Integrity, Elegance, Loyalty and Benevolence. More than 10 clubs and societies of academic, service, sports or other interests are also organized.

== Healthy school policy ==
Objectives: 1. To develop a healthy school culture 2. To encourage a healthy lifestyle among students

== See also ==
- Education in Hong Kong
- List of schools in Hong Kong
