= List of schools in North District, Hong Kong =

This is a list of schools in North District, Hong Kong.

== Secondary schools ==
Government

- Fanling Government Secondary School (粉嶺官立中學)
- Sheung Shui Government Secondary School

Aided

- Caritas Fanling Chan Chun Ha Secondary School (明愛粉嶺陳震夏中學)
- CCC Kei San Secondary School (中華基督教會基新中學)
- Christian Alliance S W Chan Memorial College (宣道會陳朱素華紀念中學)
- De La Salle Secondary School New Territories (新界喇沙中學)
- Elegantia College (風采中學（教育評議會主辦）) - Education Convergence sponsors this school
- Fanling Kau Yan College (粉嶺救恩書院)
- Fanling Rhenish Church Secondary School (粉嶺禮賢會中學)
- Fung Kai Liu Man Shek Tong Secondary School (鳳溪廖萬石堂中學)
- Fung Kai No. 1 Secondary School (鳳溪第一中學)
- HHCKLA Buddhist Ma Kam Chan Memorial English Secondary School (香海正覺蓮社佛教馬錦燦紀念英文中學)
- HKTA Tang Hin Memorial Secondary School (香港道教聯合會鄧顯紀念中學)
- PLK Ma Kam Ming College (保良局馬錦明中學)
- SKH Chan Young Secondary School (聖公會陳融中學)SKH Chan Young Secondary School
- St Francis of Assisi's College (聖芳濟各書院)
- Tin Ka Ping Secondary School
- TWGH Kap Yan Directors' College
- TWGH Li Ka Shing College

Direct Subsidy Scheme

- Fanling Lutheran Secondary School (基督教香港信義會心誠中學)

Private

- International College Hong Kong (NT)
- Rudolf Steiner Education Foundation Hong Kong Maria College

== Primary schools ==
Government

- Fanling Government Primary School (粉嶺官立小學)

Aided

- Alliance Primary School, Sheung Shui (上水宣道小學)
- Fanling Assembly of God Church Primary School (基督教粉嶺神召會小學)
- Fanling Public School (粉嶺公立學校)
- FSFTF Fong Shu Chuen Primary School (方樹福堂基金方樹泉小學)
- Fuk Tak Education Society Primary School (福德學社小學)
- Fung Kai Innovative School (鳳溪創新小學)
- Fung Kai Liu Yun-sum Memorial College (鳳溪廖潤琛紀念學校)
- Fung Kai No. 1 Primary School (鳳溪第一小學)
- HHCKLA Buddhist Chan Shi Wan Primary School (香海正覺蓮社佛教陳式宏學校)
- HHCKLA Buddhist Ching Kok Lin Association School (香海正覺蓮社佛教正覺蓮社學校)
- HHCKLA Buddhist Wisdom Primary School (香海正覺蓮社佛教正慧小學)
- Kam Tsin Village Ho Tung School (金錢村何東學校)
- Lee Chi Tat Memorial School (李志達紀念學校)
- Pentecostal Gin Mao Sheng Primary School (五旬節靳茂生小學)
- Pentecostal Yu Leung Fat Primary School (五旬節于良發小學)
- Pui Ling School of the Precious Blood (寶血會培靈學校)
- Salvation Army C C F Queen's Hill School (救世軍中原慈善基金皇后山學校)
- Sha Tau Kok Central Primary School (沙頭角中心小學)
- Shek Wu Hui Public School (石湖墟公立學校)
- SKH Ka Fuk Wing Chun Primary School (聖公會嘉福榮真小學)
- SKH Wing Chun Primary School (聖公會榮真小學)
- Ta Ku Ling Ling Ying Public School (打鼓嶺嶺英公立學校)
- Tsang Mui Millennium School (曾梅千禧學校)
- Tung Koon School (東莞學校)
- TWGH Hong Kong and Kowloon Electrical Appliances Merchants Association Limited School (東華三院港九電器商聯會小學)
- TWGHS Ma Kam Chan Memorial Primary School (東華三院馬錦燦紀念小學)
- TWGHS Tseng Hin Pei Primary School (東華三院曾憲備小學)
- Wai Chow Public School (Sheung Shui) (上水惠州公立學校)
- Yuk Yin School (育賢學校)

== Special schools ==
Aided

- HHCKLA Buddhist Po Kwong School (香海正覺蓮社佛教普光學校)
- Hong Kong Red Cross Hospital Schools North District Hospital (香港紅十字會醫院學校)
- Salvation Army Shek Wu School (救世軍石湖學校)
