= Shek Lei Estate =

Public housing estate in Kwai Chung, New Territories

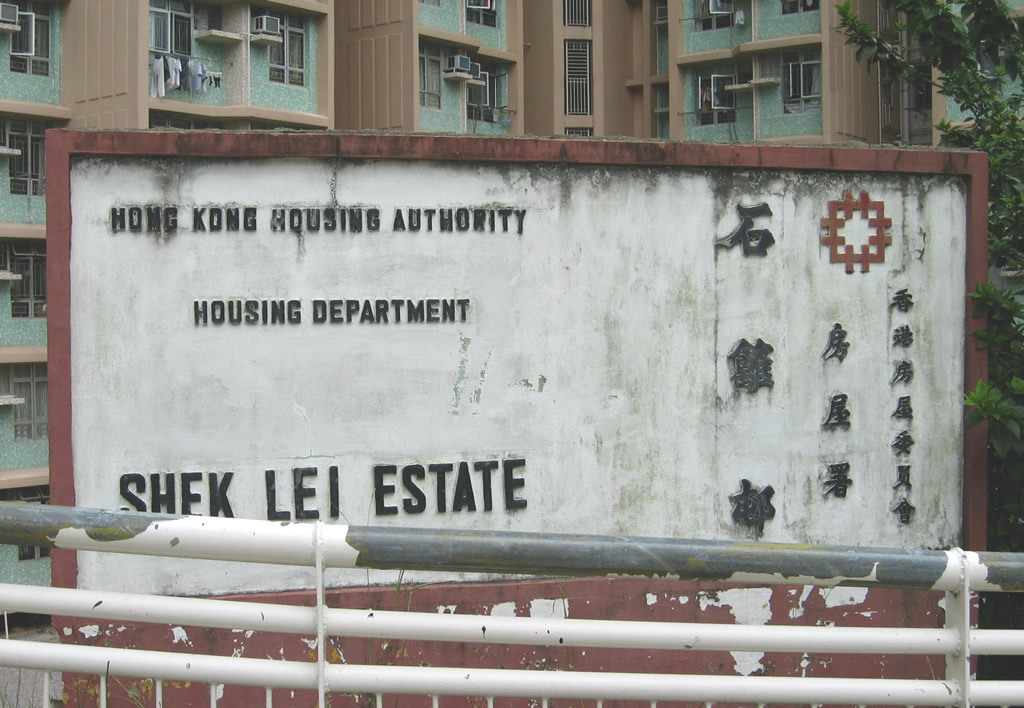
- Estate sign
- Interactive map of Shek Lei Estate

General information
- Location: Kwai Chung, New Territories; Hong Kong
- Coordinates: 22.364344°N 114.140021°E
- Status: Completed
- Category: Public rental housing Interim housing
- Population: 39,896 (2016)
- No. of blocks: 21

Construction
- Authority: Hong Kong Housing Authority

Shek Lei Estate
- Chinese: 石籬邨
- Cantonese Yale: shek6 lei4 tsun1
- Jyutping: sek6 lei4 cyun1
Transcriptions
Standard Mandarin
- Hanyu Pinyin: Shílí Cùn
Hakka
- Romanization: sak6 li2 cun1
Yue: Cantonese
- Yale Romanization: shek6 lei4 tsun1
- Jyutping: sek6 lei4 cyun1

Shek Lei
- Chinese: 石梨
- Cantonese Yale: shek6 lei4
- Jyutping: sek6 lei4
Transcriptions
Standard Mandarin
- Hanyu Pinyin: Shílí
Hakka
- Romanization: sak6 li2
Yue: Cantonese
- Yale Romanization: shek6 lei4
- Jyutping: sek6 lei4

Shek Lei Pui
- Chinese: 石梨貝
- Cantonese Yale: shek6 lei4 pui3
- Jyutping: sek6 lei4 bui3
Transcriptions
Standard Mandarin
- Hanyu Pinyin: Shílí bèi
Hakka
- Romanization: sak6 li2 bui4
Yue: Cantonese
- Yale Romanization: shek6 lei4 pui3
- Jyutping: sek6 lei4 bui3

Shek Lei Estate (Chinese: 石籬邨), also known by Shek Lei (石籬/石梨, both are currently used) is a public housing estate in Hong Kong, situated in the Shek Lei Pui (石梨貝/石梨背/石犁背) area in northeast Kwai Chung, New Territories, near Shek Yam Estate, On Yam Estate and Shek Yam East Estate.

The estate is separated into two parts, namely Shek Lei (I) Estate (石籬(一)邨) and Shek Lei (II) Estate (石籬(二)邨). It has a total of 21 residential blocks with a population of about 40,000, as well as two shopping centres. It is the second-largest public housing estate in Kwai Chung, after Kwai Chung Estate.

In addition, there is a two-block Home Ownership Scheme property connected to the estate, called Yi Fung Court.

== History ==
=== Resettlement estate ===
The estate sits on the lower slope of Golden Hill, near the boundary of Kam Shan Country Park. The original Shek Lei Pui Village was located some distance away, at the current site of the Shek Lei Pui Reservoir, on the opposite site of the Golden Hill ridgeline to the south-east.

Shek Lei Resettlement Estate was built in the 1960s by the Architectural Office of the former Public Works Department (PWD), and was completed in 1971. Architecturally, the estate took the form of interlinked high-rise Old Slab blocks, similar to other 1960s estates in Hong Kong. Public housing estates built by PWD tended to be more basic in design, with fewer amenities, than those built by the Housing Society or Housing Authority, which took over the construction of all public housing estates in the 1970s.

A unique sculptural children's playground, designed by American artist Paul Selinger for the Urban Services Department, opened in 1969. It was funded with a donation by the Royal Hong Kong Jockey Club. The playground was demolished in the 1990s.

By 1975, the estate had a population of approximately 69,600, making it the most populous public housing estate in Tsuen Wan New Town at that time.

=== Redevelopment ===
In the 1960s, when the estate was built, Hong Kong suffered from chronic water shortages, and some building contractors wrongly prepared concrete using seawater, leading to corrosion and spalling in subsequent years. By the 1980s, this had prompted safety concerns at numerous Hong Kong public housing estates. Tests carried out at Shek Lei Estate revealed areas of weak concrete in certain blocks. The entire estate was redeveloped in the 1980s and 1990s except for the original blocks 10 and 11, which were converted into interim housing in 1996–97.

The site of Shek Foon House, the newest block, was originally reserved for construction of an indoor Regional Council recreation centre. However, the council was abolished at the turn of the millennium, and the site lay derelict for many years, much to the dissatisfaction of local residents, as the government debated whether the new Leisure and Cultural Services Department should take the project forward. In the end, the Housing Authority took over the site and developed housing there. Construction of the 41-storey block began in November 2009 and was completed in 2013. Built at a cost of approximately HK$370 million, the project included construction of a lift tower and footbridges linking Shek Lei Estate to the neighbouring On Yam Estate.

== Shek Lei (I) Estate ==
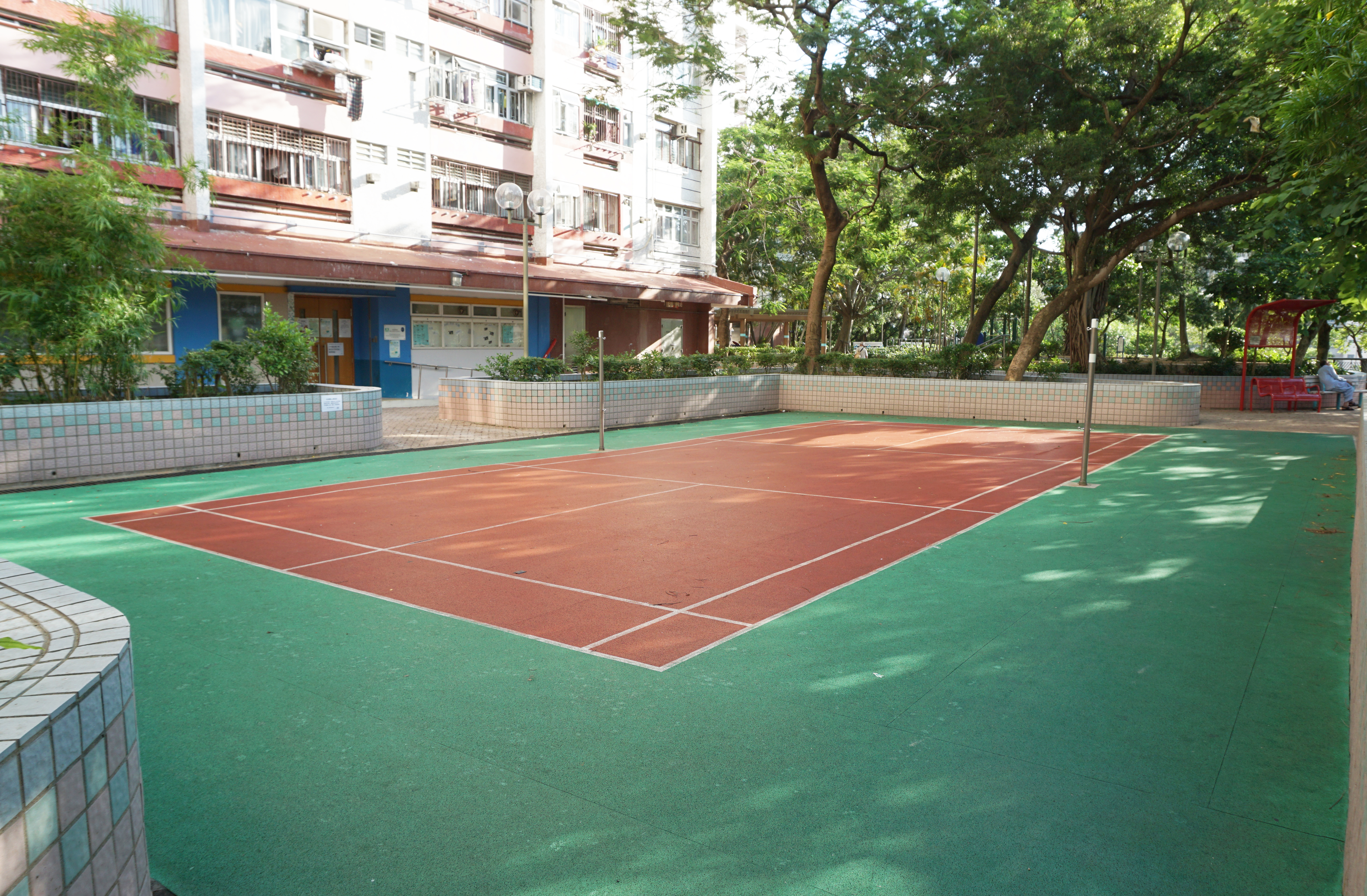
Badminton court at Shek Lei (I) Estate

Shek Lei (I) Estate (also referred as Shek Lei Extension 石籬擴展區 and New Shek Lei 新石籬) has nine blocks. Of the nine blocks, seven were completed in the 1980s, and are situated on Lei Pui Street; the other 2, Shek On House and Shek Tai House, located on Shek Pai Street, were built during the redevelopment project of the estate in the 1990s.

Name	Type	Completion
Shek Ning House	Slab	1985
Shek Sau House	Slab	1985
Shek Chun House	Double H	1985
Shek Yat House	Double H	1986
Shek Hing House	Linear 3	1989
Shek On House	Harmony 1	1994
Shek Tai House	Harmony 1	1997

== Shek Lei (II) Estate ==
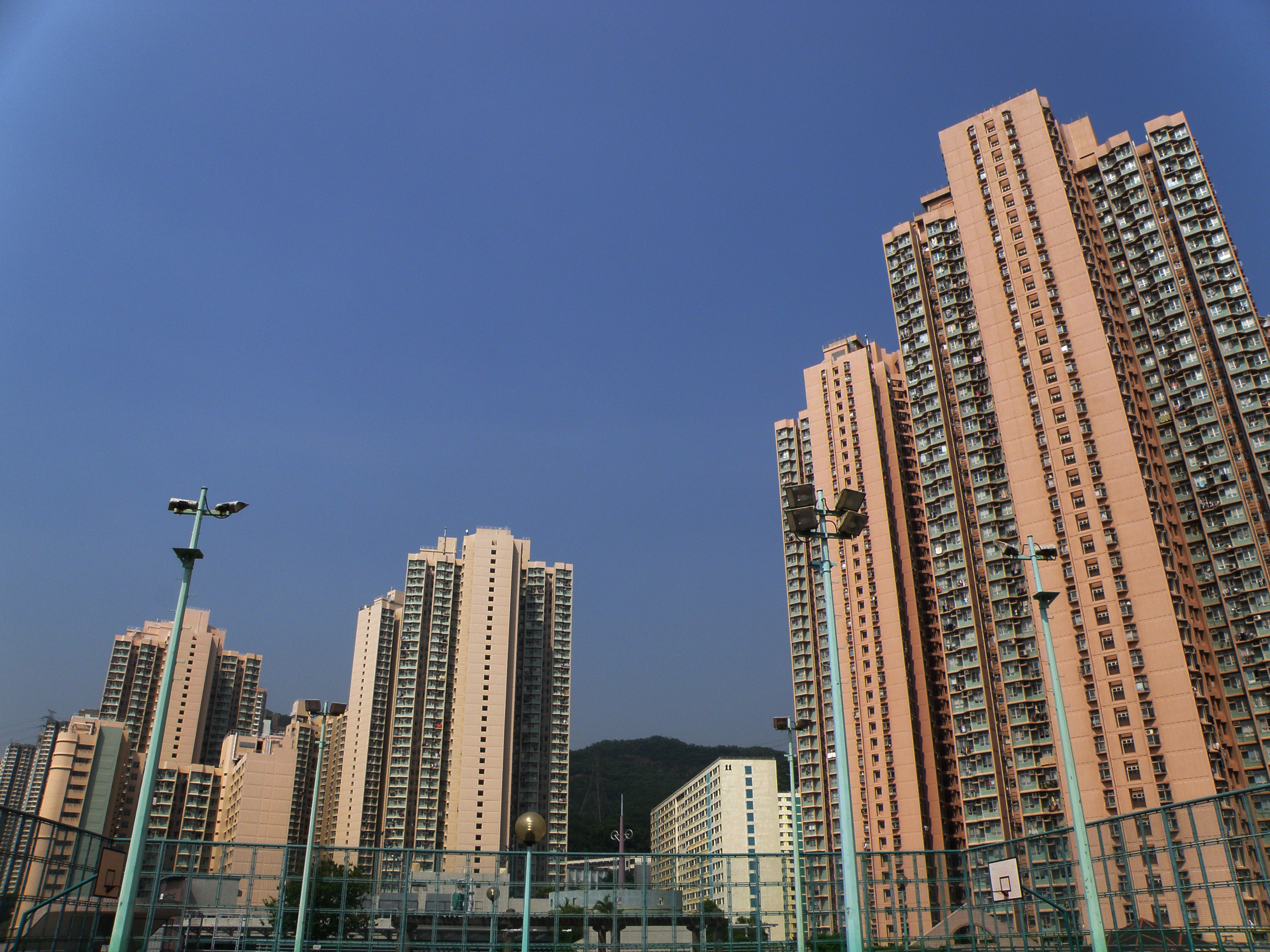
Residential blocks of Shek Lei (II) Estate

Shek Lei (II) Estate is located between Shek Li Street and Tai Loong Street. It is also referred as Shek Lei District or Shek Lei Resettlement Estate, as it was built on the site of a resettlement estate completed in the 1960s. The estate was redeveloped between the 1990s and 2000s (decade). However, two old blocks are retained, and were converted into Interim Housing.

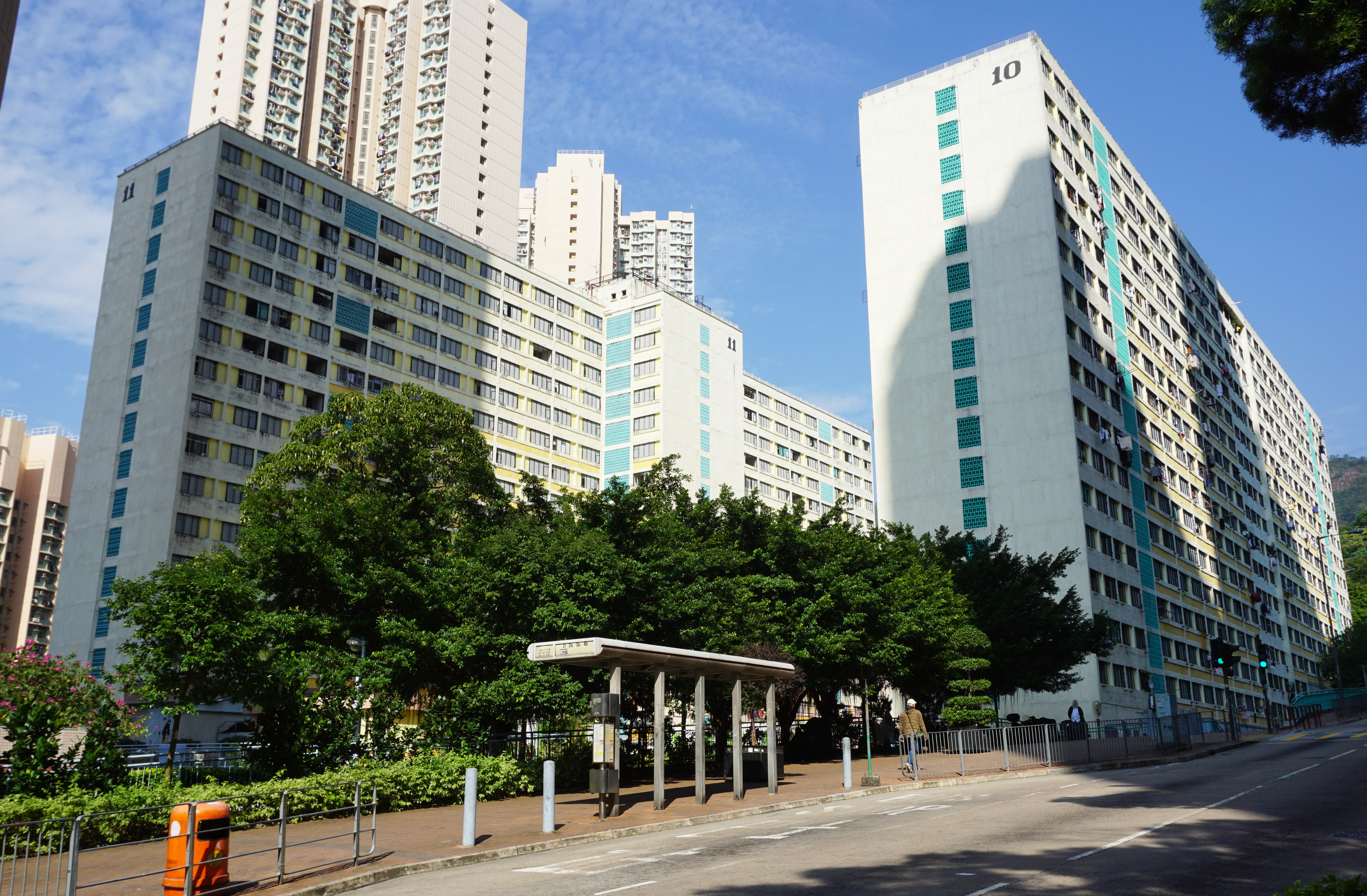
Block 10 and 11, part of the original resettlement estate built in the 1960s

Two old blocks, Blocks 10 and 11, are retained for Interim Housing since 1997, to provide totally 1,946 units for rehousing those homeless families who are not immediately eligible for public housing.

The Housing Authority completed a structural investigation of Shek Lei Interim Housing and decided it would not be cost-effective to retain the buildings. In the chief executive's 2020 policy address it was announced that the two interim housing blocks would be demolished and the site redeveloped. In early 2021, the Housing Authority said that the 329 households living in the blocks would all be rehoused by the end of 2022, either in public rental housing or at the Po Tin Interim Housing in Tuen Mun. Redevelopment of the site is expected to be completed in 2028, and is planned to provide 1,600 new flats.

Name	Type	Completion
Shek Wah House	Harmony 1	1995
Shek Kai House	Harmony 1	1995
Shek Fu House	Harmony 1	2000
Shek Cheung House	Harmony 1	2000
Shek Kwong House	Harmony 1	2002
Shek Wing House	Harmony 1	2002
Shek Yan House	Harmony 3A	2002
Shek Hei House	Small Household Block	2000
Shek Fuk House	Small Household Block	2003
Shek Wai House	New Harmony 1	2008
Shek Yi House	New Harmony 1	2008
Shek Foon House	Non-Standard Domestic (T-shaped)	2013
Block 10 (Interim Housing)	Old slab	1966
Block 11 (Interim Housing)	Old slab	1967

== Yi Fung Court ==
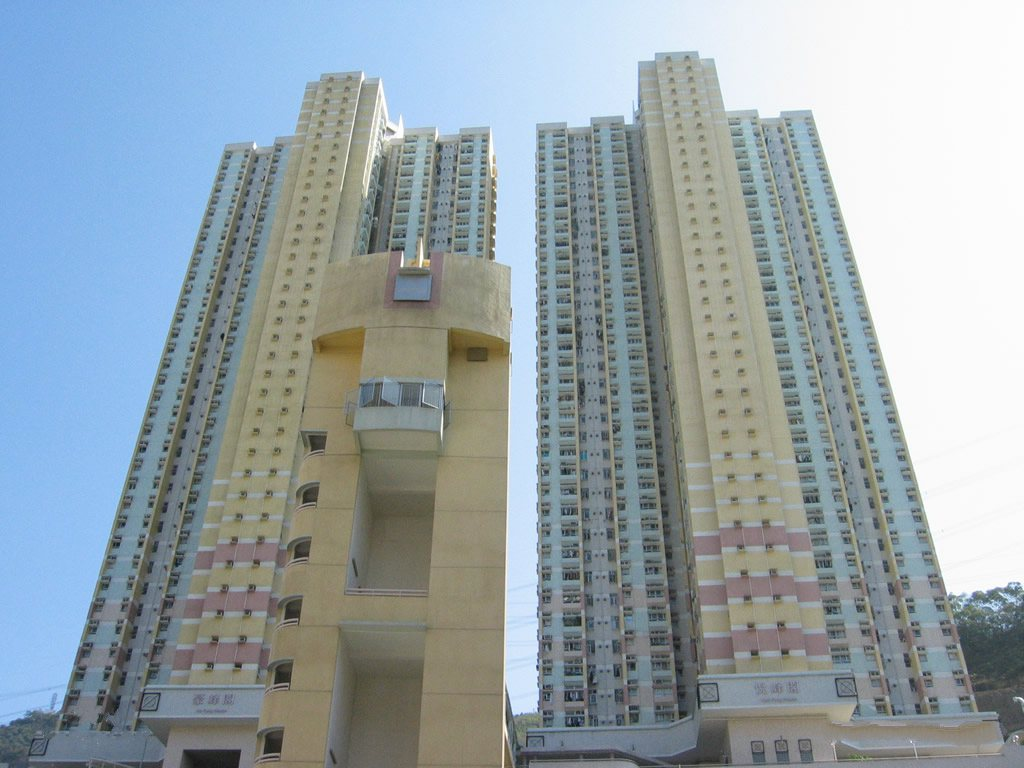
Yi Fung Court

Yi Fung Court (怡峰苑) is a Home Ownership Scheme court in the upper hills of Shek Lei Extension, Lei Pui Street. It has 2 blocks built in 1999.

Name	Type	Completion
Yuet Fung House	New Cruciform (Ver.1984)	1999
Ho Fung House	New Cruciform (Ver.1984)	1999

== Demographics ==
According to the 2016 by-census, Shek Lei (I) Estate had 13,567 residents, while Shek Lei (II) estate had 26,329 residents, adding up to a total of 39,896.

This represents an increase from the 37,994 recorded in the 2011 census. The increase may be attributable to the opening of Shek Foon House in 2013.

== Education ==
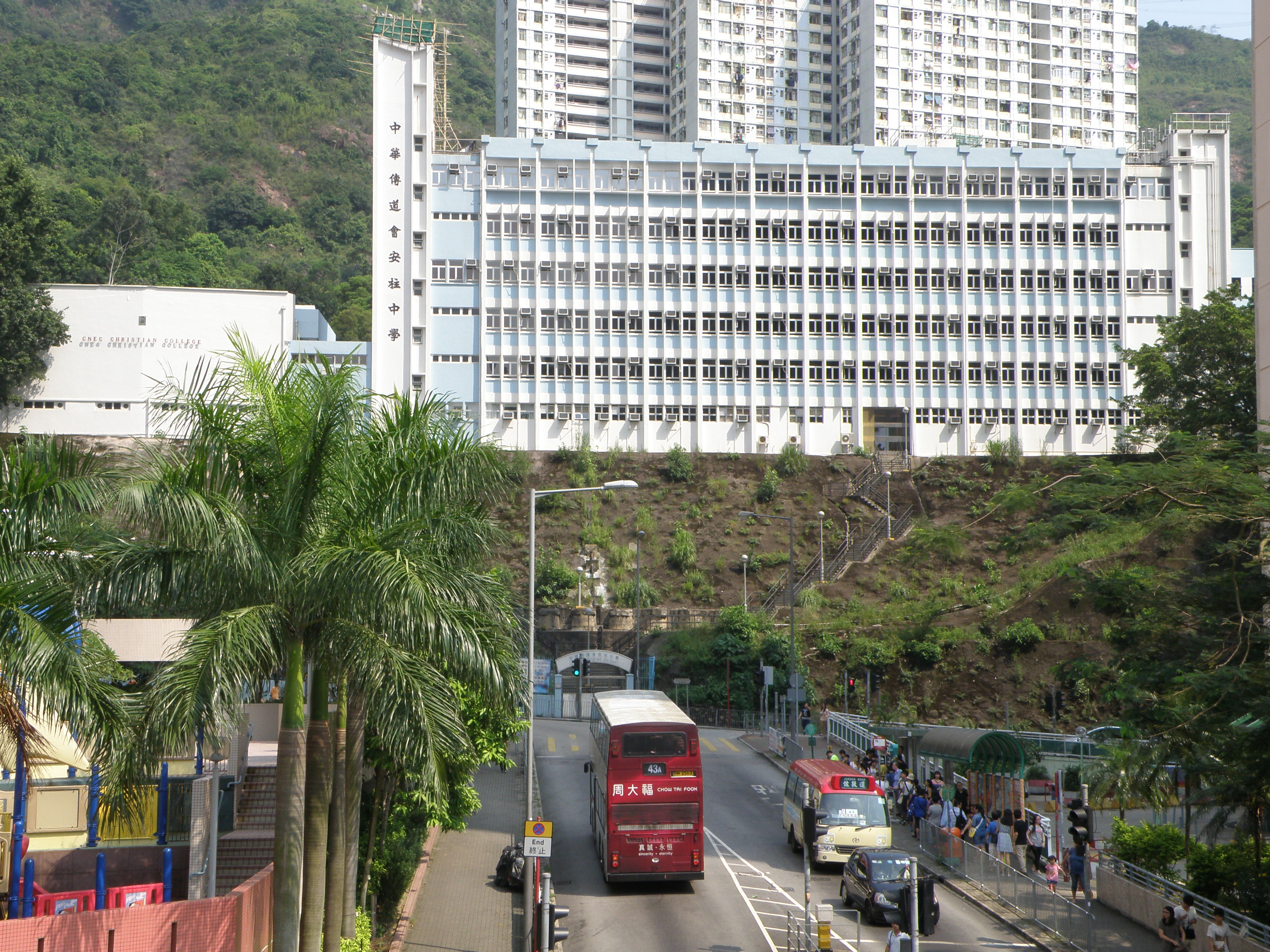
CNEC Christian College

There are many schools in the Shek Lei area, including the following institutions within or directly adjacent to the estate:

- CNEC Christian College
- CTU Training Centre Shek Lei Campus
- Pope Paul VI College
- Salesian Yip Hon Primary School
- Shek Lei Catholic Primary School
- Shek Lei St. John's Catholic Primary School

The estate had another secondary school, Sheung Kwai Chung Government Secondary School, which closed in 2009.

Shek Lei Estate is in Primary One Admission (POA) School Net 64, which includes multiple aided schools (schools operated independently of the government but funded with government money); none of the schools in the net are government schools.

== Politics ==
Due to its high population, Shek Lei Estate falls within three different District Council constituencies. The elected representatives of these constituencies sit on the 32-seat Kwai Tsing District Council.

- Shek Lei South constituency encompasses the entirety of Shek Lei (I) Estate, as well as Shek Wah and Shek Kai houses of Shek Lei (II) Estate. Since the 2019 election, it has been represented by Leung Kwok-wah of the Democratic Party.
- Shek Lei North constituency covers the core area of Shek Lei (II) Estate. It is represented by Lam Siu-fai of the Democratic Party, who has held the seat since 1999.
- Tai Pak Tin East constituency includes three blocks of Shek Lei (II) Estate: Shek Fu, Shek Cheung, and Shek Foon houses. Created for the 2019 election, it is represented by Lau Kwai-mui of the Democratic Party.

== Shopping centres ==
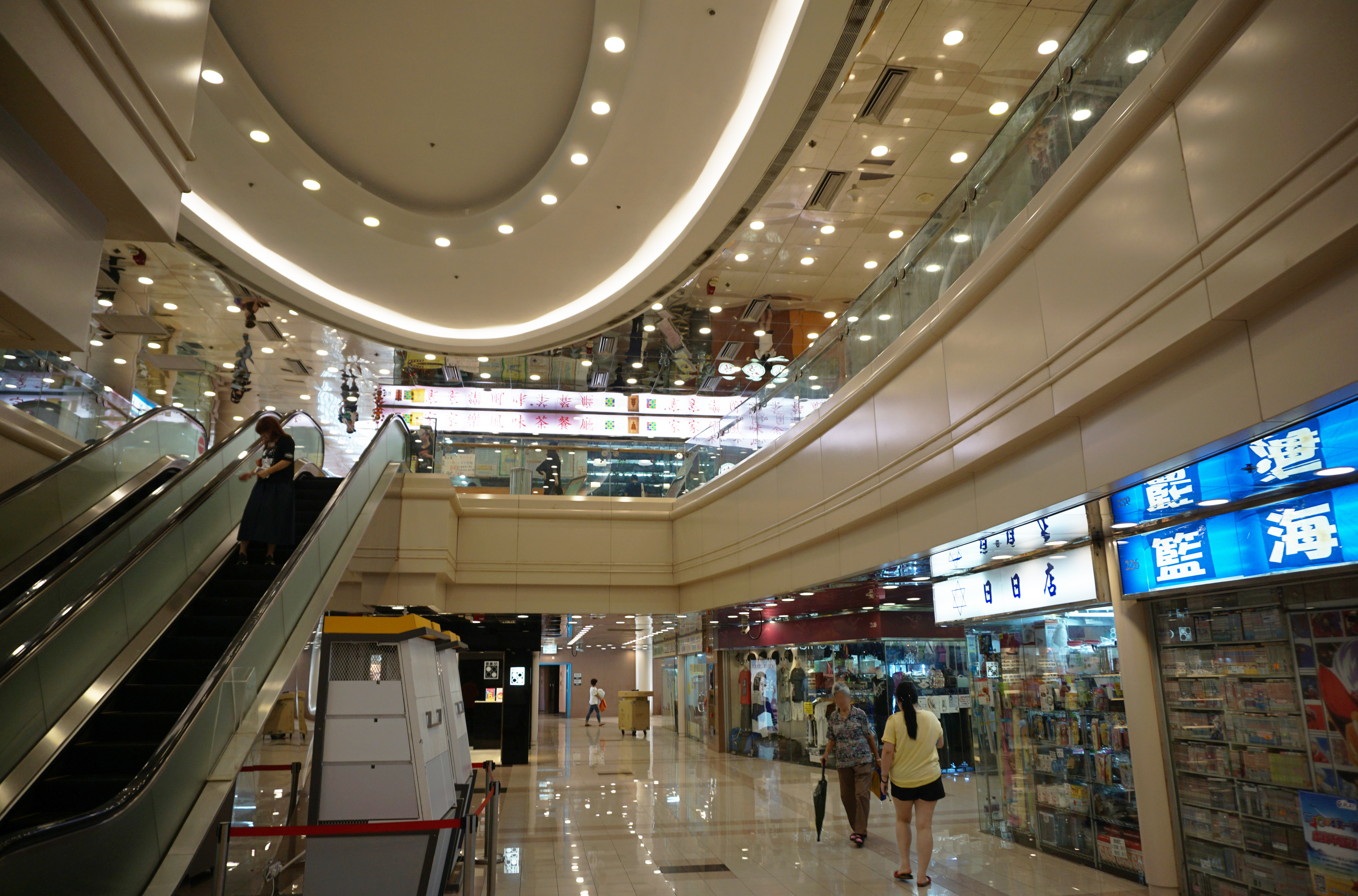
Interior of Shek Lei Shopping Centre, 2016

Shek Lei Shopping Centre serves the shopping needs of residents in the vicinity. It is divided into Phase I and Phase II, and both of them are located at the junction of Tai Loong Street and Wai Kek Street. A wet market is located inside Shek Lei Shopping Centre Phase I.

Shek Lei Shopping Centre (Phase 1), a four-storey retail building, was built in 1993. The six-storey Shek Lei Shopping Centre (Phase 2) was built in 1999. Both phases were originally built and owned by the Hong Kong Housing Authority (HKHA).

In 2005, the Hong Kong government controversially divested various HKHA assets, mainly shopping centres and car parks, into a new real estate investment trust called Link REIT. Both Shek Lei properties were transferred to Link REIT on 25 November 2005.

In late 2017, Link REIT sold 17 Hong Kong shopping centres, including Shek Lei Shopping Centre, to a consortium led by Hong Kong-based Gaw Capital, which paid HK$23 billion for the properties. The sale caused anxiety among tenants of Shek Lei Shopping Centre due to speculation that the sale could mean additional rent increases. The chairman of Gaw Capital, Goodwin Gaw, sought to allay such fears by suggesting that rent would be tied to sales turnover, and stated that their business model meant that Gaw Capital was not pressured to pursue the hefty rent increases which had made Link REIT so controversial.

The shopping centre now operates under Gaw Capital's "People's Place" banner. Phase I has approximately 59 shops and/or market stalls. Phase II has approximately 74 shops.

== Covid pandemic ==
Shek Wah House on the Shek Lei (II) Estate was placed under lockdown for mandatory tests on 30 January 2022, after the virus was found in sewage samples. Shek Chun House was blocked on 26 February 2022. Shek Sau House was sealed on 27 February.

== See also ==
- List of public housing estates in Hong Kong
- Public housing estates in Kwai Chung
- Public housing in Hong Kong
