= Daughters of Mary Help of Christians Siu Ming Catholic Secondary School =

Coordinates: 22°21′55.25″N 114°7′43.15″E

Daughters of Mary Help of Christians Siu Ming Catholic Secondary
- No.6 Kwai Yip Street, Kwai Chung, Hong Kong

Information
- Type: Public
- Motto: Purity and Charity (Integrity and Honesty; Love and Concern) 純潔仁愛 (純樸廉潔律己、仁厚關愛待人)
- Founded: 1973
- Principal: Sr. Anita Kwok Ming Ying (former) Ms. Leung Pui Shan
- Language: English

Daughters of Mary Help of Christians Siu Ming Catholic Secondary School
- Traditional Chinese: 天主教母佑會蕭明中學
- Simplified Chinese: 天主教母佑会萧明中学
Transcriptions
Standard Mandarin
- Hanyu Pinyin: Tiānzhǔjiào Mǔyòuhuì Xiāo Míng Zhōngxué
Yue: Cantonese
- Jyutping: tin1 zyu2 gaau3 mou5 jau6

Daughters of Mary Help of Christians Siu Ming Catholic Secondary School (天主教母佑會蕭明中學), founded in 1973, is a girls' secondary school in Kwai Chung, Hong Kong. It is administered under the Grant Code and using English as a medium of instruction, or being an "EMI school".

== Religion ==
Catholicism

== Brief history ==
Daughters of Mary Help of Christians Siu Ming Catholic Secondary School is a subsidized girls' grammar school run by the Daughters of Mary Help of Christians, founded in 1973.

A view from footbridge of the playground of two volleyball and one basketball courts.

== Teachers ==
The total number of teaching staff members is 61 with 66% of them holding master's degrees as their highest education level, 33% holding bachelor's degrees as their highest education level and 100% holding professional qualifications.

== Medium of instruction ==
English is the medium of instruction. Chinese Language, Chinese History, Putonghua, Chinese Literature, Liberal Studies, Ethics & Religious Education, Civic Education, Life & Society, and Visual Arts are conducted in Chinese.

== Class organization ==
There are 24 classes, 4 classes each from S.1 to S.6. There are 16 elective modules of 13 different subjects offered to the 4 classes in each level of S.4 to S.6.

== See also ==
- Education in Hong Kong
- List of schools in Hong Kong
