= Carmel Alison Lam Foundation Secondary School =

Grammar, secondary school in Hong Kong, China

Coordinates: 22.3506°N 114.1338°E

- 迦密愛禮信中學
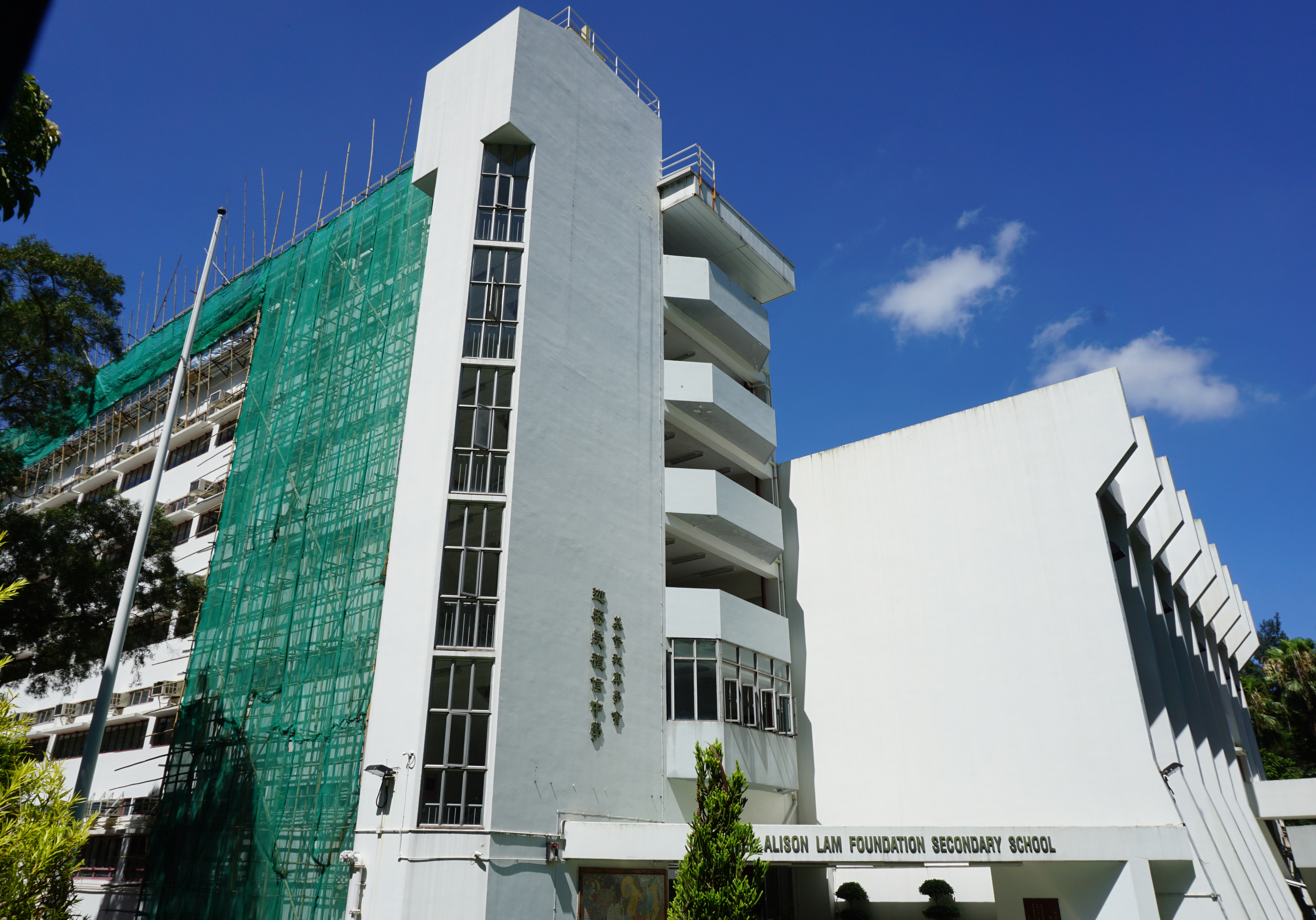

Location
- 4 Wah King Hill Road , Kwai Chung, NT, China; China

Information
- Type: Grammar, secondary
- Motto: 明道．律己．忠主．善群
- Established: 1982
- Founder: Ms.Lam Lai Bing
- School district: Kwai Tsing District
- Chairman: Mr.Chan Ping Man
- Rector: Carmel
- Faculty: Around 90
- Teaching staff: around 70
- Grades: F1 to F6
- Gender: Co-educational
- Enrollment: around 1274
- Campus: One Campus
- Colours: White and red
- Athletics: Swimming Gala; Sports Day(2 Days); Interhouse Sport Competition
- Mascot: Eagle
- Yearbook: School Year Plan(Chinese Only)
- Affiliation: Christian

Carmel Alison Lam Foundation Secondary School
- Traditional Chinese: 迦密愛禮信中學
Transcriptions

Carmel Alison Lam Foundation Secondary School is a secondary school in Hong Kong established in 1982.

== History ==
Founded in 1982, the educational institution is a Christian school. The Evangelical School Development Incorporation is the school's sponsor. The school ran a "flipped classroom" day in 2024 in which 28 students acted as teachers who instructed teachers about how activities like chess, the culture of Japan, and creating butter cookies.

== School Management Committee ==
The School Management Committee is the top management of the school.

== Staff and students ==
The school had about 1200 students in 30 classes and had 70 staff in 2007.

== Projects ==
A Reading Award Scheme is launched to establish a reading culture among students, with the aim of enhancing students' language proficiency. Starting from the academic year 2004–05, online learning through the eClass platform was introduced to the school. An individual account is allocated to every teacher and student, so that students can continue their online learning after school and during holidays. Through the platform, teachers and students can carry out online discussions as well as obtain the latest information.

In 1992, the school introduced "ASL Liberal Studies" to the curriculum.

In the 2004 Advanced Level Examinations, students achieved a 100% passing rate in Liberal Studies. Beginning in 2005, Liberal Studies were introduced to the Form One curriculum, so that students are familiarized with the subject that will be implemented under a new academic structure. Liberal Studies equips students to understand today's social, national and global issues.

== Academic and extracurricular performance ==
In the past three years, thirteen subjects obtained 90% or above passing rate in the HKCE and HKAL examinations (100% passed in seven of the subjects), 80% in ten other subjects, and the distinction and credit rate of 16 subjects has been above the average rate in Hong Kong. In respect of extra-curricular performances, students have won awards in the following competitions:

- Hong Kong Schools Speech Festival and Music Festival
- Hong Kong Multiple Intelligence Competition
- Hong Kong New Generation IQ Contest
- Statistical Project Competition for Secondary School Students,
- Hong Kong Schools Drama Festival,
- Chinese chess and Go competition,
- International and district sand sculpturing competitions,
- New Territories and Kwai Tsing district competitions:
  - handball
  - swimming
  - athletics
  - cross country running
  - basketball
  - volleyball
  - badminton
  - Association football
  - table-tennis
- All Hong Kong Schools and Asian bowling and squash competition,
- Hong Kong Reading Carnival Booth Design Competition
