= Lintong railway station =

Railway station in Xi'an, China

Lintong 临潼
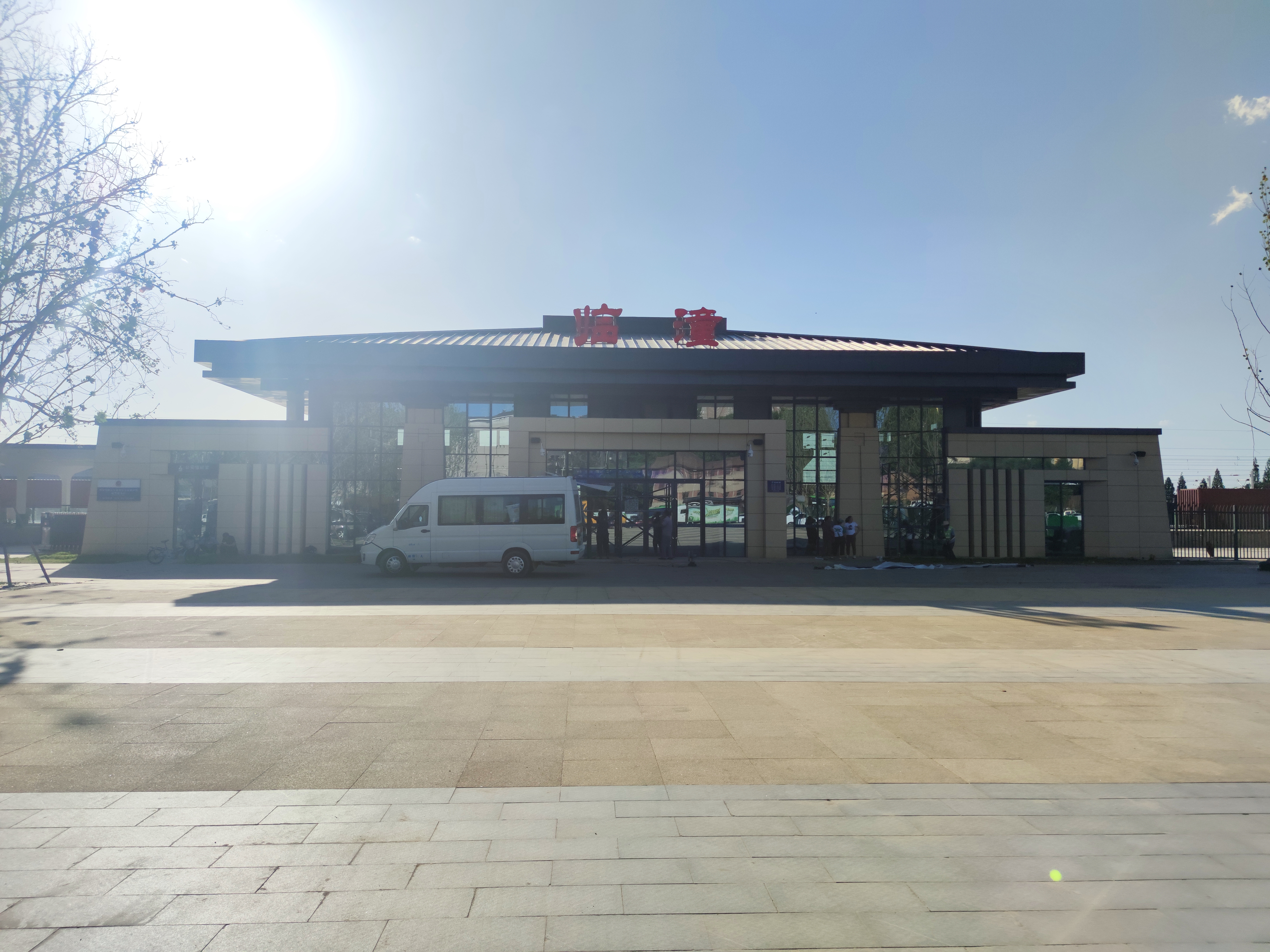

General information
- Location: Lintong District, Xi'an, Shaanxi; China
- Coordinates: 34°23′23″N 109°12′27″E
- Operator: CR Xi'an
- Line: Longhai Railway

Other information
- Station code: 39413 (TMIS code); LIY (telegraph code); LTO (Pinyin code)
- Classification: Class 4 station (四等站)

History
- Opened: 1934
Location
- Location within China

Lintong railway station (Chinese: 临潼站) is a railway station of Longhai railway located in Lintong District, Xi'an, Shaanxi, China.

The station is currently out of passenger service.

== History ==
The station was opened in 1934.
