= Tai Pak Tin =

Village in Hong Kong

Coordinates: 22.373638°N 114.134782°E

Tai Pak Tin (Chinese: 大白田村) is a village in the Tsuen Wan District of Hong Kong.

== Administration ==
Tai Pak Tin is a recognized village under the New Territories Small House Policy.
