= Kwai Shing East Estate =

Public housing estate in Kwai Chung, Hong Kong

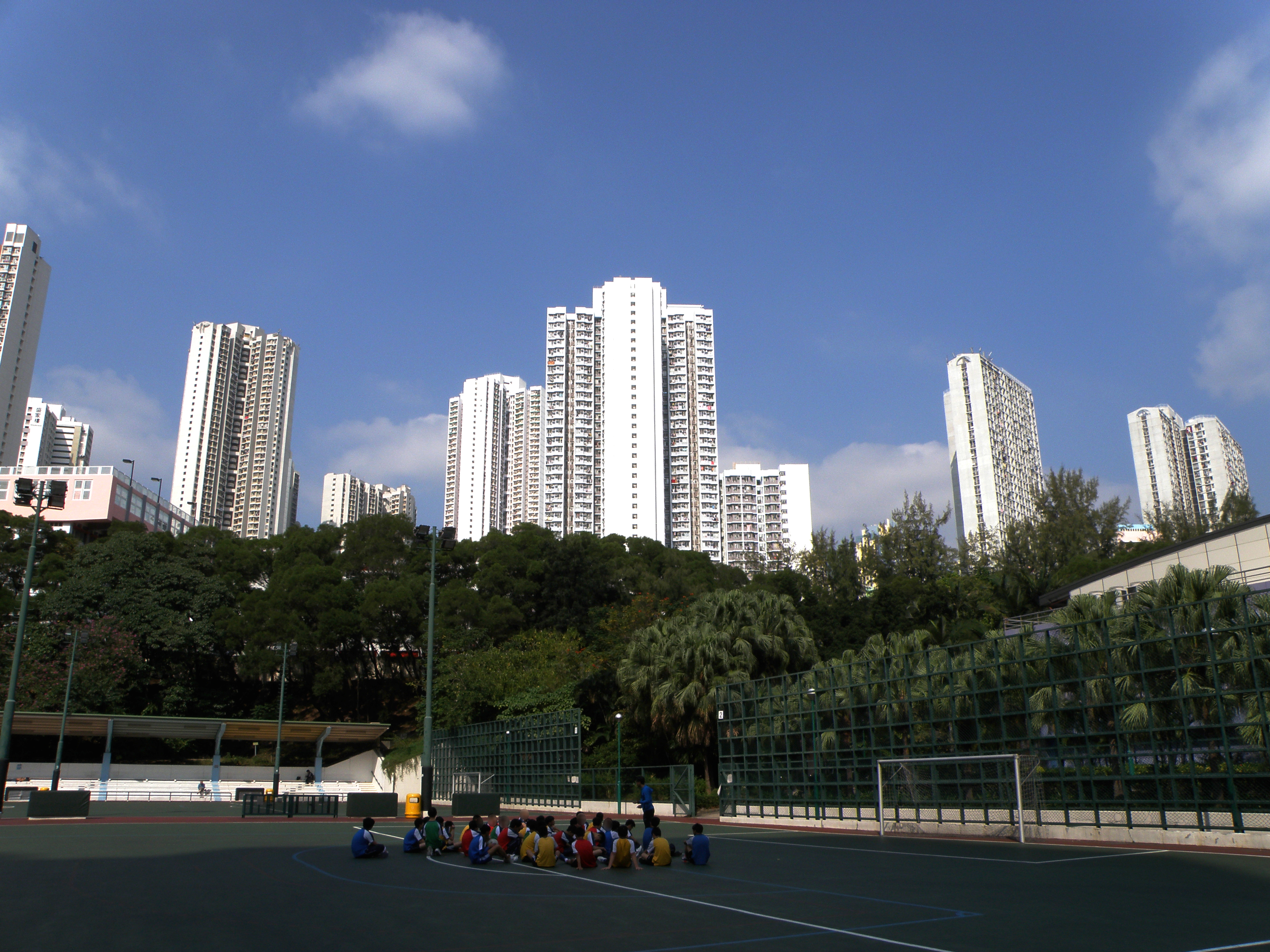
- Kwai Shing East Estate
- Interactive map of Kwai Shing East Estate

General information
- Location: 12 & 63 Kwai Shing Circuit, Kwai Shing; Kwai Chung; New Territories, Hong Kong
- Coordinates: 22.364545°N 114.126757°E
- Status: Completed
- Category: Public rental housing
- Population: 19,805 (2016)
- No. of blocks: 11
- No. of units: 7,108

Construction
- Constructed: 1972; 54 years ago (Before reconstruction); 1990; 36 years ago (After reconstruction)
- Authority: Hong Kong Housing Authority

Kwai Shing East Estate (Chinese: 葵盛東邨) is a public housing estate in Kwai Shing, Kwai Chung, New Territories, Hong Kong located at the east of Kwai Shing West Estate and near MTR Kwai Hing station. It consists of ten residential blocks completed between 1990 and 2003.

== History ==
Kwai Shing East Estate was formerly Kwai Shing Estate (Chinese: 葵盛邨) which had nine blocks (blocks 12 to 20) completed in 1972 and 1973. In 1977, these blocks were renamed as Kwai Shing East Estate. In 1985, the HKHA announced that the strength of the concrete in Blocks 18 and 20 of the estate were below standard. Those blocks were demolished in 1989. The remaining blocks (except block 12) were demolished and replaced by new buildings in the 1990s and 2000s. In 1995, Block 12 was converted into Interim Housing temporarily to settle people ineligible for public rental housing. But in 2008, the Hong Kong Housing Authority announced plans to demolish block 12 in 2010.

== Houses ==
Name	Chinese name	Building type	Completed
Shing Fung House	盛豐樓	Linear 1	1990
Shing Hei House	盛喜樓	Linear 1	1990
Shing Hing House	盛興樓	Harmony 1	1993
Shing On House	盛安樓	Harmony 3A	1993
Shing Kwok House	盛國樓	Harmony 3A	1997
Shing Lok House	盛樂樓	Harmony 1	1998
Shing Fu House	盛富樓	Harmony 1	1998
Shing Keung House	盛強樓	Harmony 1	1999
Shing Yat House	盛逸樓	Harmony 1	1999
Shing Ka House	盛家樓	Small Household Block	1999
Shing Wo House	盛和樓	Small Household Block	2003

== Demographics ==
According to the 2016 by-census, Kwai Shing East Estate had a population of 19,805. The median age was 45.8 and the majority of residents (97.5 per cent) were of Chinese ethnicity. The average household size was 3.1 people. The median monthly household income of all households (i.e. including both economically active and inactive households) was HK$22,990.

== Politics ==
Kwai Shing East Estate is located in Kwai Shing East Estate constituency of the Kwai Tsing District Council. It was formerly represented by Rayman Chow Wai-hung, who was elected in the 2019 elections until July 2021.

== See also ==
- Public housing estates in Kwai Chung
