= Kwai Shing West Estate =

Public housing estate in Kwai Chung, Hong Kong

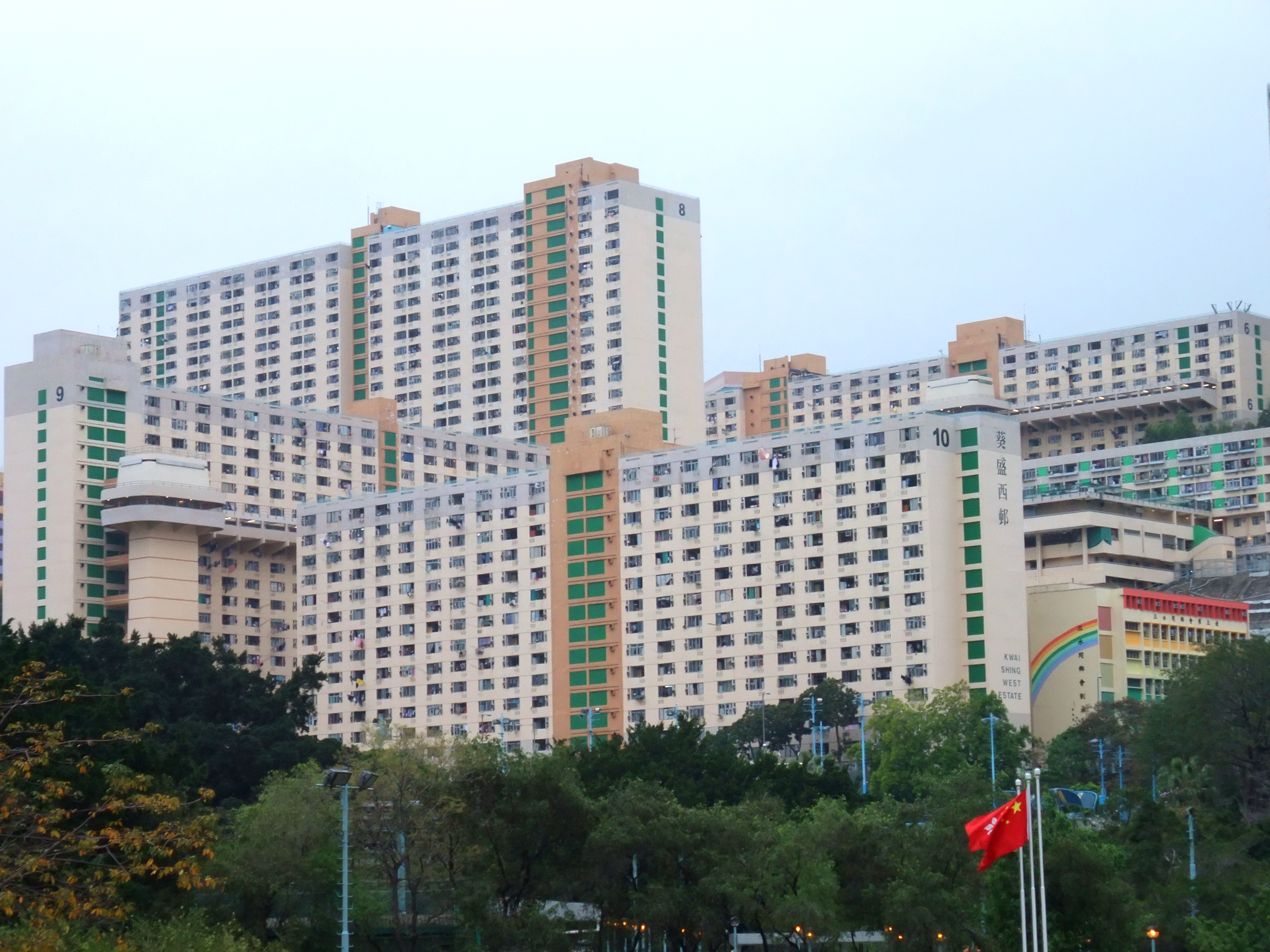
- Kwai Shing West Estate
- Interactive map of Kwai Shing West Estate

General information
- Location: Kwai Shing Circuit, Kwai Shing; Kwai Chung; New Territories, Hong Kong
- Coordinates: 22.3612°N 114.1224°E
- Status: Completed
- Category: Public rental housing
- Population: 13,720 (2016)
- No. of blocks: 10
- No. of units: 5,261

Construction
- Constructed: 1975; 51 years ago
- Authority: Hong Kong Housing Authority

Kwai Shing West Estate (Chinese: 葵盛西邨) is a public housing estate in Kwai Shing, Kwai Chung, New Territories, Hong Kong located at the east of Kwai Shing East Estate. It consists of ten residential blocks completed between 1975 and 1977.

== Houses ==
Name	Chinese name	Building type	Completed
Block 1	第1座	Old Slab	1977
Block 2	第2座	Old Slab	1977
Block 3	第3座	Old Slab	1976
Block 4	第4座	Old Slab	1976
Block 5	第5座	Old Slab	1976
Block 6	第6座	Old Slab	1976
Block 7	第7座	Old Slab	1976
Block 8	第8座	Old Slab	1976
Block 9	第9座	Old Slab	1976
Block 10	第10座	Old Slab	1975

== Demographics ==
According to the 2016 by-census, Kwai Shing West Estate had a population of 13,720. The median age was 46.1 and the majority of residents (97 per cent) were of Chinese ethnicity. The average household size was 2.7 people. The median monthly household income of all households (i.e. including both economically active and inactive households) was HK$21,500.

== Politics ==
Kwai Shing West Estate is located in Kwai Shing West Estate constituency of the Kwai Tsing District Council. It is currently represented by Ivy Leung Ching-shan, who was elected in the 2019 elections.

== See also ==
- Public housing estates in Kwai Chung
