= List of schools in Tuen Mun District =

This is a list of schools in Tuen Mun District, Hong Kong.

== Secondary schools ==
Government

- South Tuen Mun Government Secondary School (南屯門官立中學)
- Tuen Mun Government Secondary School

Aided

- Baptist Wing Lung Secondary School (浸信會永隆中學)
- Buddhist Sum Heung Lam Memorial College (佛教沈香林紀念中學)
- Caritas Tuen Mun Marden Foundation Secondary School (明愛屯門馬登基金中學)
- CCC Hoh Fuk Tong College (中華基督教會何福堂書院)
- CCC Tam Lee Lai Fun Memorial Secondary School
- Ching Chung Hau Po Woon Secondary School (青松侯寶垣中學)
- Christian Alliance College (宣道中學)
- Christian Alliance S C Chan Memorial College (香港九龍塘基督教中華宣道會陳瑞芝紀念中學)
- CMA Choi Cheung Kok Secondary School (廠商會蔡章閣中學)
- CBRS Mrs Aw Boon Haw Secondary School (鐘聲慈善社胡陳金枝中學)
- HHCKLA Buddhist Leung Chik Wai College (香海正覺蓮社佛教梁植偉中學)
- Ho Ngai College (sponsored by Sik Sik Yuen) (嗇色園主辦可藝中學)
- Ju Ching Chu Secondary School (Tuen Mun) (裘錦秋中學﹝屯門﹞)
- Lui Cheung Kwong Lutheran College (路德會呂祥光中學)
- Madam Lau Kam Lung Secondary School of MFBM (妙法寺劉金龍中學)
- NLSI Peace Evangelical Secondary School (新生命教育協會平安福音中學)
- PAOC Ka Chi Secondary School (加拿大神召會嘉智中學)
- PLK Centenary Li Shiu Chung Memorial College (保良局百周年李兆忠紀念中學)
- PLK Tang Yuk Tien College
- San Wui Commercial Society Secondary School (新會商會中學)
- Semple Memorial Secondary School (深培中學)
- SKH St Simon's Lui Ming Choi Secondary School (聖公會聖西門呂明才中學)
- SMKMCF Ma Ko Pan Memorial College (馬錦明慈善基金馬可賓紀念中學)
- STFA Leung Kau Kui College
- STFA Tam Pak Yu College (順德聯誼總會譚伯羽中學)
- Tsung Tsin College (崇真書院)
- Tuen Mun Catholic Secondary School
- TWGH Sun Hoi Directors' College (東華三院辛亥年總理中學)
- TWGH Yau Tze Tin Memorial College
- TWGHS Mr & Mrs Kwong Sik Kwan College (東華三院鄺錫坤伉儷中學)
- Yan Chai Hospital No. 2 Secondary School (仁濟醫院第二中學)
- Yan Oi Tong Tin Ka Ping Secondary School (仁愛堂田家炳中學)
- Yot Chan Wong Suk Fong Memorial Secondary School (仁愛堂陳黃淑芳紀念中學)
- YPI&CA Lee Lim Ming College (恩平工商會李琳明中學)

Private

- Harrow International School Hong Kong

== Primary schools ==
Government

- Tuen Mun Government Primary School (屯門官立小學)

Aided

- AD& FD of Pok Oi Hospital Mrs Cheng Yam On Millennium School (博愛醫院歷屆總理聯誼會鄭任安夫人千禧小學)
- AD& FD of Pok Oi Hospital Mrs Cheng Yam On School (博愛醫院歷屆總理聯誼會鄭任安夫人學校)
- Castle Peak Catholic Primary School (青山天主教小學)
- CCC But San Primary School (中華基督教會拔臣小學)
- CCC Hoh Fuk Tong Primary School (中華基督教會何福堂小學)
- CCC Mong Wong Far Yok Memorial Primary School (中華基督教會蒙黃花沃紀念小學)
- FDBWA Chow Chin Yau School (五邑鄒振猷學校)
- HK Eng Clansman Association Wu Si Chong Memorial School (僑港伍氏宗親會伍時暢紀念學校)
- HKRSS Tuen Mun Primary School (香港紅卍字會屯門卍慈小學)
- Islamic Primary School (伊斯蘭學校)
- LKWFS Lau Tak Yung Memorial Primary School (世界龍岡學校劉德容紀念小學)
- Lok Sin Tong Leung Wong Wai Fong Memorial School (樂善堂梁黃蕙芳紀念學校)
- Lui Cheung Kwong Lutheran Primary School (路德會呂祥光小學)
- Lutheran Tsang Shing Siu Leun School (香港路德會增城兆霖學校)
- PLK Fong Wong Kam Chuen Primary School (保良局方王錦全小學)
- PLK Horizon East Primary School (保良局志豪小學)
- PLK Leung Chow Shun Kam Primary School (保良局梁周順琴小學)
- PLK Vicwood KT Chong No. 2 Primary School (保良局莊啓程第二小學)
- PLK WWCWD Fung Lee Pui Yiu Primary School (保良局西區婦女福利會馮李佩瑤小學)
- SKH Mung Yan Primary School (聖公會蒙恩小學)
- SRBCEPSA Ho Sau Ki School (柏立基教育學院校友會何壽基學校)
- STFA Ho Yat Tung Primary School (順德聯誼總會何日東小學)
- STFA Lee Kam Primary School (順德聯誼總會李金小學)
- STFA Wu Siu Kui Memorial Primary School (順德聯誼總會胡少渠紀念小學)
- Taoist Ching Chung Primary School (Wu King Estate) (道教青松小學（湖景邨）)
- Taoist Ching Chung Primary School (道教青松小學)
- Toi Shan Association Primary School (台山商會學校)
- TWGH Tang Shiu Kin Primary School (東華三院鄧肇堅小學)
- TYYI Chan Kwok Chiu Hing Tak Primary School (圓玄學院陳國超興德小學)
- Yan Oi Tong Madam Lau Wong Fat Primary School (仁愛堂劉皇發夫人小學)
- Yan Tak Catholic Primary School (仁德天主教小學)
- YCH Ho Sik Nam Primary School (仁濟醫院何式南小學)
- YCH Law Chan Shor Si Primary School (仁濟醫院羅陳楚思小學)

Direct Subsidy Scheme

- Po Leung Kuk Hong Kong Taoist Association Yuen Yuen Primary School (保良局香港道教聯合會圓玄小學)

Private

- Harrow International School Hong Kong
- R.T.C. Gaia School (鄉師自然學校)

== Special schools ==
Aided

- Hong Chi Morninglight School, Tuen Mun (匡智屯門晨曦學校)
- Hong Chi Morninghill School, Tuen Mun (匡智屯門晨崗學校)
- Hong Chi Morninghope School, Tuen Mun (匡智屯門晨輝學校)
- Hong Kong Christian Service Pui Oi School (香港基督教服務處培愛學校)
- Hong Kong Red Cross Hospital Schools Castle Peak Hospital (香港紅十字會醫院學校)
- Hong Kong Red Cross Hospital Schools Tuen Mun Hospital (香港紅十字會醫院學校)
- Tung Wan Mok Law Shui Wah School (東灣莫羅瑞華學校)
