= CNEC Lee I Yao Memorial Secondary School =

Coordinates: 22.3593°N 114.1212°E

- 1 Shing Fuk Street, Kwai Shing, New Territories; Hong Kong

Information
- Type: Co-ed, aided
- Motto: Faith, Righteousness, Loyalty & Honesty
- Established: 1981
- School district: Kwai Shing
- Principal: Mr. Tang Kam Ming
- Enrollment: Approx. 1200
- Colors: Blue, Red, Green & Yellow
- Affiliation: Christian Nationals' Evangelism Commission (CNEC) (中華傳道會)
- Website: http://www.liymss.edu.hk/

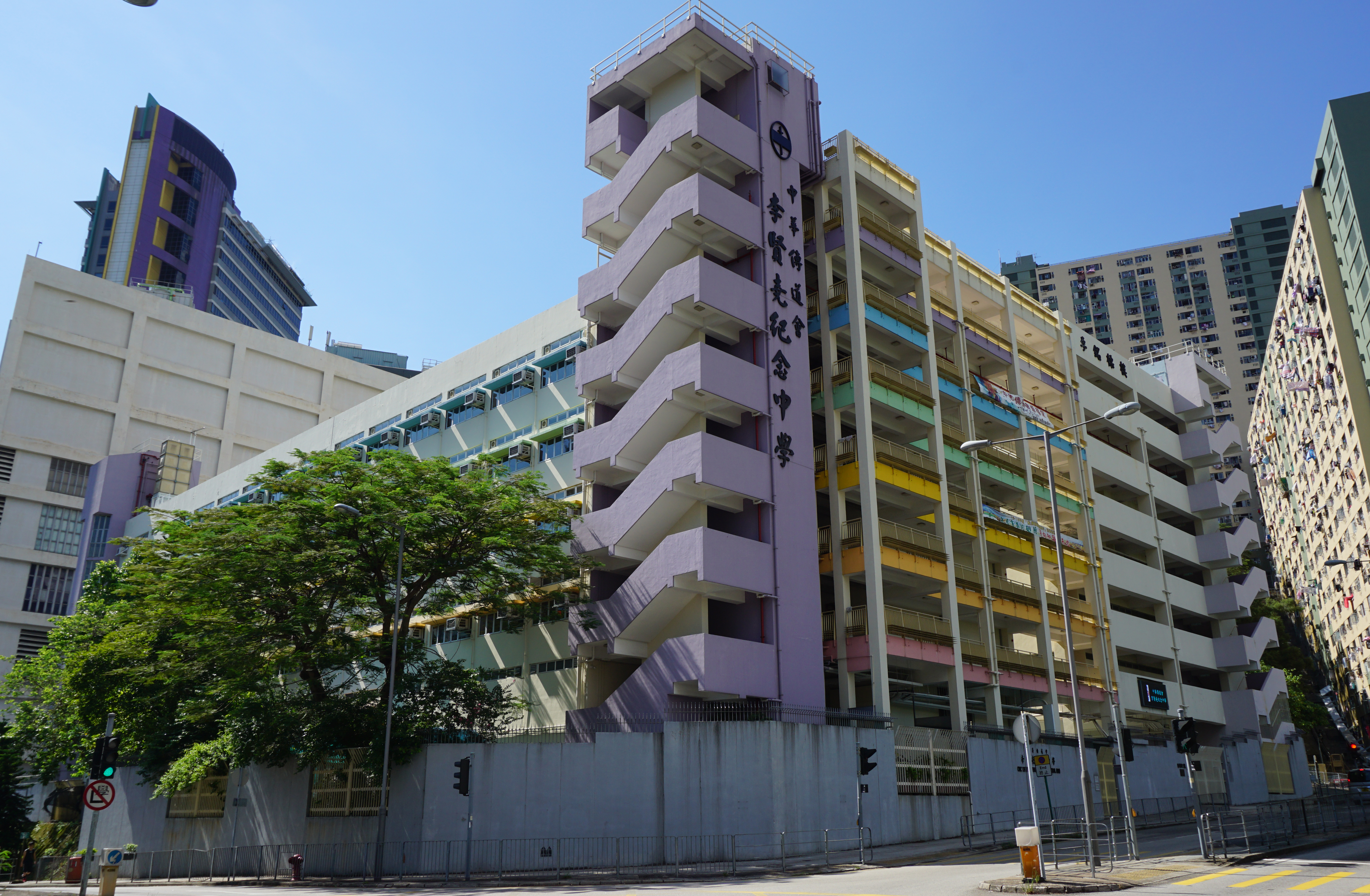

CNEC Lee I Yao Memorial Secondary School (LIY) (Chinese: 中華傳道會李賢堯紀念中學) is an aided Chinese medium of instruction school founded in 1981 upon the principles of Christian evangelicalism. Its sponsoring body is the Christian Nationals' Evangelism Commission (中華傳道會).

LIY is located in Kwai Shing, within the larger industrial district of Kwai Chung, which is well known for its busy container terminal.
