= Pope Paul VI College =

Secondary school in Kwai Chung, New Territories

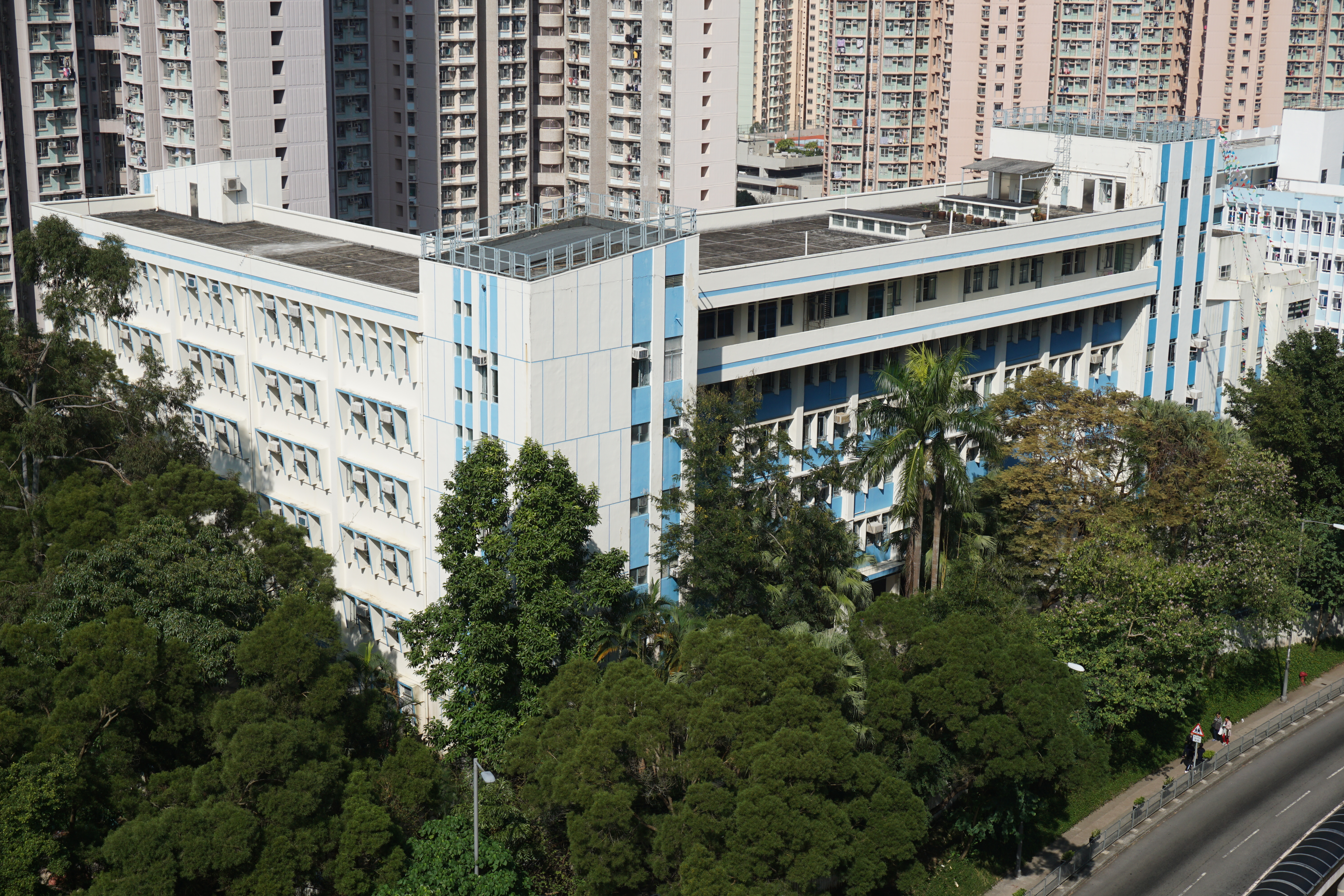
- School building

Location
- 8 Lei Pui Street; Kwai Chung, New Territories; Hong Kong
- 22.3633°N 114.1386°E

Information
- Type: Aided school
- Motto: Love and Service
- Religious affiliation: Catholicism
- Established: 1969
- Principal: Leung Yee Ho Genthew
- Supervisor: Sr. Marinei Pessanha Alves
- Faculty: 55
- Language: English
- Sponsoring body: Missionary Sisters of the Immaculate

Pope Paul VI College is a band 1B Roman Catholic girls' secondary school in Hong Kong. The school was founded by Missionary Sisters of the Immaculate in 1969. It is an English medium of instruction school. It is a well-known district girls’ school.

== History ==
In 1967, Lorenzo Bianchi, then-Roman Catholic bishop of Hong Kong, invited the Missionary Sisters of the Immaculate (PIME Sisters) to establish a girls' secondary school in the Tsuen Wan area, which the Hong Kong government was developing into a new town.

Construction of the school building, beside the Shek Lei Resettlement Estate, began in July 1969. Classes began in September 1969 at the Shek Lei Catholic Primary School. The school moved to the permanent school building in August 1970, which was formally inaugurated by Director of Education John Canning on 24 May 1970.

A golden jubilee celebration was held in 2019.

== Faculty ==
During the 2019–20 school year, the school employed 55 teachers. The current principal is Genthew Leung.
