= EMI schools =

English medium secondary schools in Hong Kong

English-medium-of-instruction schools, also known as EMI schools, are secondary schools that use English as a medium of instruction in Hong Kong. As of 2019 there are currently around 100 EMI schools, accounting for around 30% of the total local secondary schools.

Larry Chuen-ho Chow and Yiu-Kwan Fan stated in the publication The Other Hong Kong Report 1998 that EMI schools gained a reputation for being "elite schools providing better preparation for children to meet their future needs", and were considered to be better than Chinese medium schools (CMI schools); they stated since 1997 "Parents rushed to send their children to EMI schools." Jacqueline Chak-Kei Woo, in the essay "Parental choice in the education market", published in 2016, stated that "EMI schools are still being treated as the "holy grail" nowadays".

== History ==
In the late 19th century British Hong Kong authorities persuaded schools to use English as the medium of instruction, rather than Cantonese, by supplying grants. In 1974 the Hong Kong authorities chose not to prefer either language and instead allowed each school to decide its language of instruction. There had been a decline of the number of CMI schools since many Hong Kong parents desired an EMI education. In the 1990s pre-handover British Hong Kong authorities moved towards having a preference for CMI, a decision accelerated by Hong Kong post-handover.

The Hong Kong government issued the September 1997 Medium of Instruction Guidance for Secondary Schools, new criteria that determined whether a school may continue to be EMI: the school needed to have teachers who could teach in English and a student body with 85% being able to learn both Chinese and English. A total of 300 secondary schools previously using English began using Chinese, leaving 114 secondary schools using English. The administrations of several schools which historically were EMI that were forced to become CMI opposed the move. In 2009 Hong Kong authorities allowed CMI schools to have special EMI classes. David C. S. Li wrote in Multilingual Hong Kong: Languages, Literacies and Identities that this action was "blurring" the distinctions between the two styles of schools.

== Operations ==
Historically, in many schools classified as EMI, even though all textbooks and reading materials were in English, the instructors used Cantonese in oral instruction in some or all occasions, making them "mixed-code". This usage and a decrease in English fluency in the late 20th century were factors persuading pre-Handover British Hong Kong authorities to promote CMI education.

As of 2016 many schools having EMI programming are also classified as Direct Subsidy Scheme (DSS) schools.

== See also ==
- Education in Hong Kong
- English Schools Foundation
- English as a second language
- Hong Kong English
- English-language education in China
