= Tung Wah (disambiguation) =

Tung Wah may refer to:

- Tung Wah Group of Hospitals, a charity organization in Hong Kong
  - Tung Wah Hospital, a hospital in Hong Kong
  - Tung Wah Eastern Hospital, a hospital in Hong Kong
  - Tung Wah College, a tertiary education institution in Hong Kong
  - Tung Wah Group of Hospitals Chang Ming Thien College, a secondary education institution in Hong Kong
  - Tung Wah Group of Hospitals Chen Zao Men College, a secondary education institution in Hong Kong
  - Tung Wah Group of Hospitals Fung Yiu King Hospital, a secondary education institution in Hong Kong
  - Tung Wah Group of Hospitals Li Ka Shing College, a secondary education institution in Hong Kong
  - Tung Wah Group of Hospitals S. C. Gaw Memorial College, a secondary education institution in Hong Kong
  - Tung Wah Group of Hospitals Wong Fut Nam College, a secondary education institution in Hong Kong
  - Tung Wah Group of Hospitals Wong Tai Sin Hospital, a secondary education institution in Hong Kong
  - Tung Wah Group of Hospitals Yau Tze Tin Memorial College, a secondary education institution in Hong Kong
  - Tung Wah Coffin Home
  - Tung Wah Group of Hospitals Museum
  - Tung Wah Charity Show
- Tung Wah (constituency), a Central and Western District Council constituency which covers the area around of the Tung Wah Hospital, Hong Kong
- Tung Wah Times, also known as Tung Wah News, a Chinese-language newspaper in Australia

== See also ==
- Donghua (disambiguation)
