= Ngan Shing-kwan =

Hong Kong entreprenuer and politician (1900–2001)

Ngan Shing-kwan CBE JP
- 顔成坤

Senior Unofficial Member of the Legislative Council
- In office 1959–1961
- Preceded by: Chau Sik-nin
- Succeeded by: Kwok Chan

Chairman of China Motor Bus
- In office 1933–2001
- Succeeded by: Irene Ngan

Personal details
- Born: 18 December 1900 British Hong Kong
- Died: 14 April 2001 (aged 100) Hong Kong Sanatorium and Hospital, Happy Valley, Hong Kong
- Spouse: Mamie Wong (m. 1927)
- Children: Irene Ngan Kit-ling (b. 1928); Horace Ngan Kit-keung (b. 1935); Henry Ngan (b. 1937)
- Education: Queen's College, Hong Kong; St. John's University, Shanghai

Ngan Shing-kwan, CBE JP (Chinese: 顏成坤; 18 December 1900 – 14 April 2001) Hong Kong entrepreneur and politician, was the founder of the China Motor Bus, or CMB, which owned the bus franchise on Hong Kong Island from June 1933 to August 1998. In addition, he was appointed by the Hong Kong government as a non-official member of the Legislative Council in 1951, and subsequently served as the Senior Unofficial Member from 1959 to 1961 and concurrently as a non-official member of the Executive Council from 1959 to 1961.

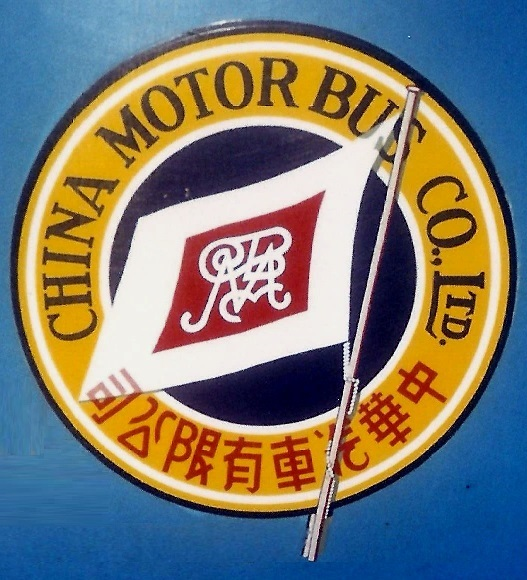
Ngan Shing-kwan's logo of China Motor Bus Company, Limited, taken on the eve of the loss of the franchise in 1998

Ngan Shing-kwan was educated at Queen's College and St. John's University in Shanghai during his early years, and took over the family's rickshaw business in 1920. Optimistic about the future of the bus business, he then joined hands with businessman Wong Yiu Nam to set up CMB in 1923, the third bus company in Kowloon. After winning the franchise in 1933, CMB moved from Kowloon to Hong Kong Island. Under his leadership, the business expanded rapidly after the war, with more than 100 bus routes, a fleet of more than 1,000 buses and hundreds of millions of passenger trips per year at its peak in the 1980s, making CMB the "Kingdom of China Motor Buses". In 1981, the PALIBURG HOLDINGS LIMITED attempted to snipe at CMB's stake, but was eventually repelled by Ngan Shing-kwan.

Outside of CMB business, Ngan Shing-kwan was a keen participant in community affairs, having been elected as the first Chairman of the Tung Wah Group of Hospitals after its merger in 1931–32, and then Chairman of Po Leung Kuk in 1939–1940. After the war, he was appointed as a Non-Official Member of the Urban Council in 1946 and was promoted to Principal Non-Official Member of the Council in 1951 before resigning in 1953 due to official commitments. As a Chaozhou overseas Chinese leader in Hong Kong, Ngan Shing-kwan held a number of public offices during his tenure in the Executive and Legislative Councils, and did not leave the political arena until after the 1960s. On the other hand, he was a keen sportsman and served as the chairman and President of the South China Athletic Association (SCAA) for eight consecutive terms before and after the World War II. He was the chief team leader of the Hong Kong delegates to the Sixth National Games of the Republic of China in 1935 and the coach of the China national football team at the 11th Olympic Games in Berlin, Germany in 1936.

However, in the 1980s, Ngan Shing-kwan's family-run governance of CMB was said to be conservative and out of touch, and problems such as declining bus service standards and labour disputes aroused public criticism, prompting the Hong Kong Government to hand over 26 and 14 bus routes to Citybus Limited in 1993 and 1995 respectively. The termination of CMB's franchise was further announced in February 1998, and CMB's franchised bus service ended at the end of August of the same year, with the new franchise being taken over by the New World First Bus Services Limited. Although Ngan Shing-kwan had been the chairman and Supervisor of CMB since 1933, he had handed over the business to his children in the mid-1990s due to old age and declining health. As a matter of fact, the Ngan family, which holds a lot of land for depots and staff quarters, has long had its sights set on real property development, so since the end of the franchise, CMB has in fact changed from a bus company to a company with purely real estate as its core business.

== Life ==
=== Early career ===
Ancestrally from Chaoyang, Guangdong, Ngan Shing-kwan was born in Hong Kong on 18 December 1900, the only son of Ngan Wing-chi and his wife. Ngan Wing-chi originally worked as a coolie (i.e., head of hard labour) in the Kowloon Wharves, and later as a coolie of the Jardine's Sugar Factory and the Tsim Sha Tsui Goods Warehouse, and as a foreman of a licensed rickshaw coolie in Kowloon. Apart from being responsible for hiring people from places like Chaozhou and Shantou to work in Hong Kong, he was also responsible for supervising the living of these coolies in Hong Kong, from which he also collected fees from these coolies. In 1901, the Hong Kong government set up a committee to investigate the serious loss of manpower in sedan chair and rickshaw coolie, and Ngan Wing-chi was invited by the committee to give evidence. Ngan Wing-chi later set up his own rickshaw business in Kowloon, opening Wing Hing and Wing Lung rickshaw stores at 3 Frederick Lane and 112 Canton Road respectively, as well as a Sun Tak Lung rickshaw store at 110 Canton Road.

However, after the death of Ngan Wing Chee on 9 March 1905, his widow, Ngan Chim, in her capacity as the estate's undertaker, entered into a power of attorney on 9 May of the same year, handing over her husband's rickshaw business during his lifetime to his brother, Ngan Luk, to take care of it on her behalf. Years later, Ngan Chim withdrew his power of attorney on 10 December 1917, declaring that Ngan Luk no longer had anything to do with the Wing Hing, Wing Lung and New Tak Lung. However, Ngan Luk initially continued to operate the business after the power of attorney was withdrawn, and it was not until a writ was later issued by Ngan Chim's party that Ngan Luk formally surrendered the business and separated the property from Ngan Chim's party. Ngan Chim then went further and filed a lawsuit in 1918, demanding that Ngan Luk's side hand over its business accounts for inspection, which was eventually ruled in favor of the case in 1919. In addition, the Ngan Chim family originally lived at 116 Canton Road, while Ngan Luk's family lived at 114 next door; but after the two parties split up, Ngan Luk's family moved away to live at the nearby No. 18 Haiphong Road.

Although he lost his father at a young age, Ngan Shing-kwan was sent by his family to the Queen's College to study English, and later went to St. John's University in Shanghai to further his studies. According to a book published in 1937 by the scholar Wu, Hsing-Lien, "A Brief History of Chinese Celebrities in Hong Kong", Ngan Shing-kwan had followed Dr. Sun Yat-sen's work of national salvation after he had left Queen's College in his early years; and as an ex-student of Queen's College, he was invited by Queen's College Ex-students' Association to be the Honorary Advisor in April 1971 after many years of service.

=== "China Motor Bus Kingdom" ===
==== Start-up CMB ====
In 1920, at the age of 20, Ngan Shing-kwan returned to Hong Kong to take over the family rickshaw business. At that time, rickshaws were still an important means of land-based public transportation in Hong Kong. For example, the Police Force chose five public rickshaw stations in Kowloon and New Kowloon in 1921 to install telephones, one of which was located at the rickshaw store of Wing Lung, No. 112 Canton Road, operated by Ngan Shing Kwan. As for Ngan Luk's rickshaw store at 142 Canton Road, it is also one of the public rickshaw stops which has been granted a telephone pavement. Nevertheless, with the gradual popularization of [[car]s], coupled with the establishment of the Kowloon Motor Bus Company (i.e. Kowloon Motor Buses/KMB) in 1921 and the Kai Tak Coach Company in 1923 to provide public bus services to the Kowloon area, there was increasingly obvious competition to the rickshaw business.

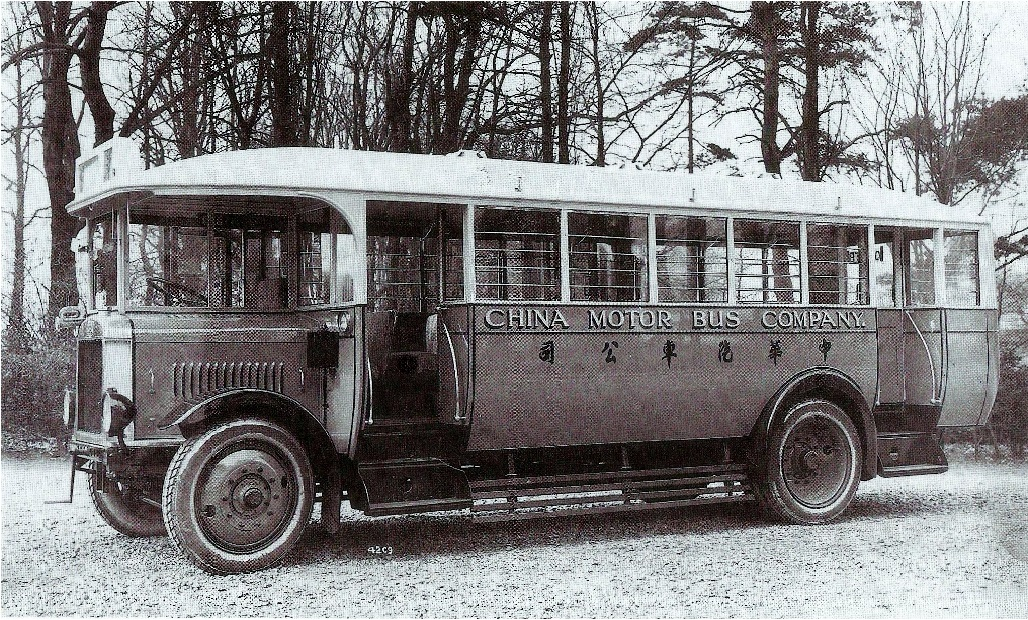
A Leyland single-decker bus purchased by CMB from England in 1926

In view of this, Ngan Shing-kwan actively planned to get a share of the public bus market, and on 2 September 1923, together with businessman Wong Yiu-nam, he co-founded the China Motor Bus Company (i.e. China Motor Bus /CMB) in Hunghom, which initially consisted of six single-decker buses, and was the third bus company in Kowloon, following the Kowloon Motor Bus Company (KMB) and the Kai Tak Coach Company (KTCC). (Note: The claim that CMB was co-founded by Ngan Shing-kwan and Wong Yiu-nam is based on a 2014 Next Magazine report, which reproduced a letter written by Ngan Shing-kwan's son, Ngan Kit-keung, in which one of the pages mentions that "my late father, Ngan Shing-kwan, C.B.E., and my uncle, Wong Yiu-nam, founded CMB".) Ngan Shing-kwan's business partner, Wong Yiu-nam, was the son of Wong Ping-chun, one of the founders of the Hong Kong Squire Sze-yap Steamship Company, so the Wong family had as much experience in public transportation as the Ngan family. In 1927, Ngan Shing-kwan married Wong Yi-mei, the daughter of Wong Ping-chun, and the two families became in-laws, and Wong Yiu-nam became Ngan Shing-kwan's great-uncle, so it is clear that Ngan and Wong had a close relationship. When CMB was first established, Ngan Shing-kwan and Wong Yiu-nam served together as its Chief Superintendent, and in the early days, it mainly provided bus services to and from Tsim Sha Tsui and Kowloon Tong areas, as well as between towns and villages in the New Territories. Although KMB was CMB's main competitor in the early years, some newspapers at the time considered CMB's service quality and management standard to be relatively satisfactory, and the management was more dedicated to its operation and actively purchased new buses, resulting in the company's gradual expansion.

In September 1932, the Hong Kong Government decided to introduce a franchise system in view of the varying standards of public bus services and invited tenders for this purpose. Under the new franchise policy, public bus services in Hong Kong could only be provided by franchised bus companies, a majority of the board of directors of a franchised bus company had to be of British nationality, and the buses used had to be manufactured in the United Kingdom or elsewhere in the British Empire (i.e. the later Commonwealth countries). This restriction on the origin of buses was not lifted until October 1984, many years later. As a matter of fact, the tendering exercise conducted by the Hong Kong Government back then appeared to be rather mysterious, and it was only when the Hong Kong Government announced the results of the tendering exercise in January 1933 that outsiders came to know that the Hong Kong Government had launched a tendering exercise in this regard. In addition, the Hong Kong Government has never made public the tendering process, nor has it refused to disclose the number of bids received or disclose the contents of unsuccessful bids, which is a longstanding lack of transparency and has attracted public criticism.

In that tender exercise, Ngan Shing Kwan's CMB was successful in winning the bus franchise for the Hong Kong Island region, while the franchise for the Kowloon and New Territories regions was won by KMB. Both franchises were also effective from 11 June 1933, for a period of 15 years. After the franchise was granted by the Hong Kong government, Ngan Shing-kwan and Wong Yiu-nam, together with businessmen Lam Cheuk-ming, Fung Keung and Ngan Shing-kwan's brother Ngan Kwong-chung, reorganized CMB into China Motor Bus Company Ltd. in the same year, while KMB was reorganized into Kowloon Motor Bus Company (1933) Limited. Ngan Shing-kwan took up the position of chairman of the board and Supervisor of the reorganized CMB, while Wong Yiu Nam took up the position of Vice Chairman and Manager, each of whom is also a permanent director of the new company. As CMB has not operated on Hong Kong Island in the past, it needs to redeploy 10 buses from Kowloon and acquire a total of 44 buses from three bus companies originally operating on Hong Kong Island, namely, Hong Kong Grand Hotel Bus Company, Hong Kong Tramways Limited and Aberdeen Kai-fong Welfare Association Bus Company.

CMB operated on Hong Kong Island initially set up a temporary depot at Watson Road, Causeway Bay, and provided nine routes. The more important routes include "Route 1" between Sheung Wan East Street and Happy Valley, "Route 3" and "Route 4" between the Royal Pier (that is, Blake Pier) in Central and the University of Hong Kong, and "Route 7" between the Yau Ma Tei Ferry Terminal (the predecessor of the Unification Ferry Pier) in Central and Aberdeen. The pre-war CMB, like the KMB, had first and second class fares, and there were already arrangements for sectional fares, monthly passes and student concessionary fares.

In December 1941, Japan invaded Hong Kong with the outbreak of the Pacific War, and the battle for the Battle of Hong Kong was imminent. CMB services came to a standstill during the war, and continued to be suspended after the fall of Hong Kong on 25 December of the same year, when Hong Kong fell under Japanese rule. It was not until 25 January 1942, that CMB was able to resume operations under the auspices of Ngan Shing Kwan, but since many of the buses were damaged or requisitioned by the Japanese during the war, coupled with the lack of fuel, only a very limited service could be maintained. In May 1942, Ngan Shing-kwan was appointed by the Japanese government as a member of the Chinese Cooperative Council; and in October of the same year, the Japanese government instructed all public transportation companies in Hong Kong, including the China Motor Bus Company (CMB) and the Kowloon Motor Bus Company (KMB), to form the Hong Kong Automobile Transportation Association (HKATA), with Japanese as advisors, and Ngan Shing-kwan was assigned to the new company as its manager. In spite of this, Hong Kong's public transportation services continue to be stagnant because of the war. At the end of 1943, Ngan Shing-kwan resigned from his position at the Automobile Transportation Association and managed to live in Macau with his family until the end of the Second World War in 1945.

==== Post-war development ====
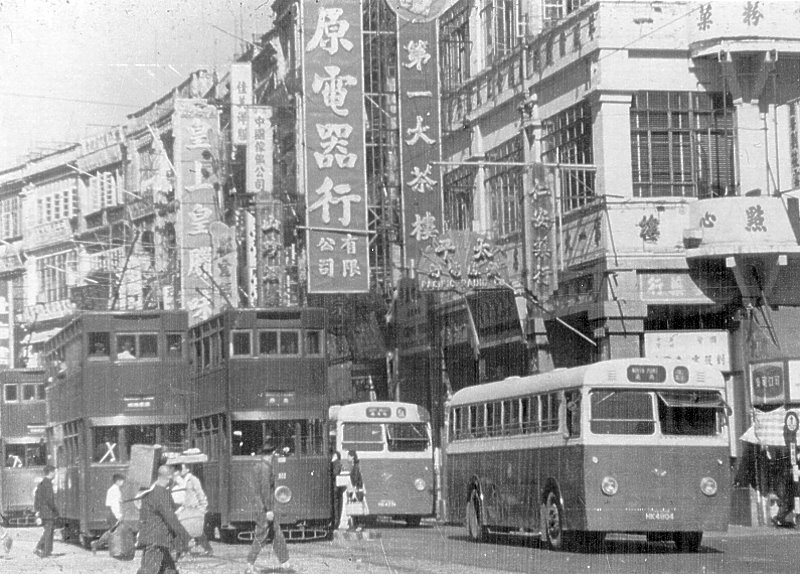
CMB's single-decker buses were seen plying in Des Voeux Road in the 1950s.

After the liberation of Hong Kong in August 1945, Ngan Shing-kwan returned to Hong Kong and tried to reorganize CMB's business. CMB, which had 108 buses before the war, has lost 75% of its bus fleet after counting, and most of the remaining buses are in need of repairs or even scrapped as a result of the war. However, at the request of the British Provisional Military Government, CMB gradually resumed service from September 1945 onwards, but in the early days, it was necessary to borrow lorries as buses. At the same time, Ngan Shing-kwan began to purchase new buses from the United Kingdom, and the number of buses rose to 47 by 1947, and by 1948 the total number of passengers had returned to over 20 million.

With the rapid growth of Hong Kong's population, CMB's post-war expansion under the auspices of Ngan Shing-kwan brought in considerable revenue under the favorable terms of the Hong Kong Government's approved rate of return. CMB's annual net profit increased from $1.1 million in 1949–1950, to $2.48 million in 1956–1957, $3.6 million in 1964–1965, and $7.3 million in 1974–1975. Since then, CMB's annual net profit has remained above HK$10 million, with net profits of over HK$33 million and over HK$70 million recorded in 1980-1981 and 1989-1990 respectively. In terms of passenger trips, CMB's total patronage in 1956-1957 amounted to 67 million, and continued to average over 100 million passenger trips per year into the 1960s, reaching a peak of 364 million in 1984–1985. In January 1962, CMBC made its first public placement of shares and officially became a public company.

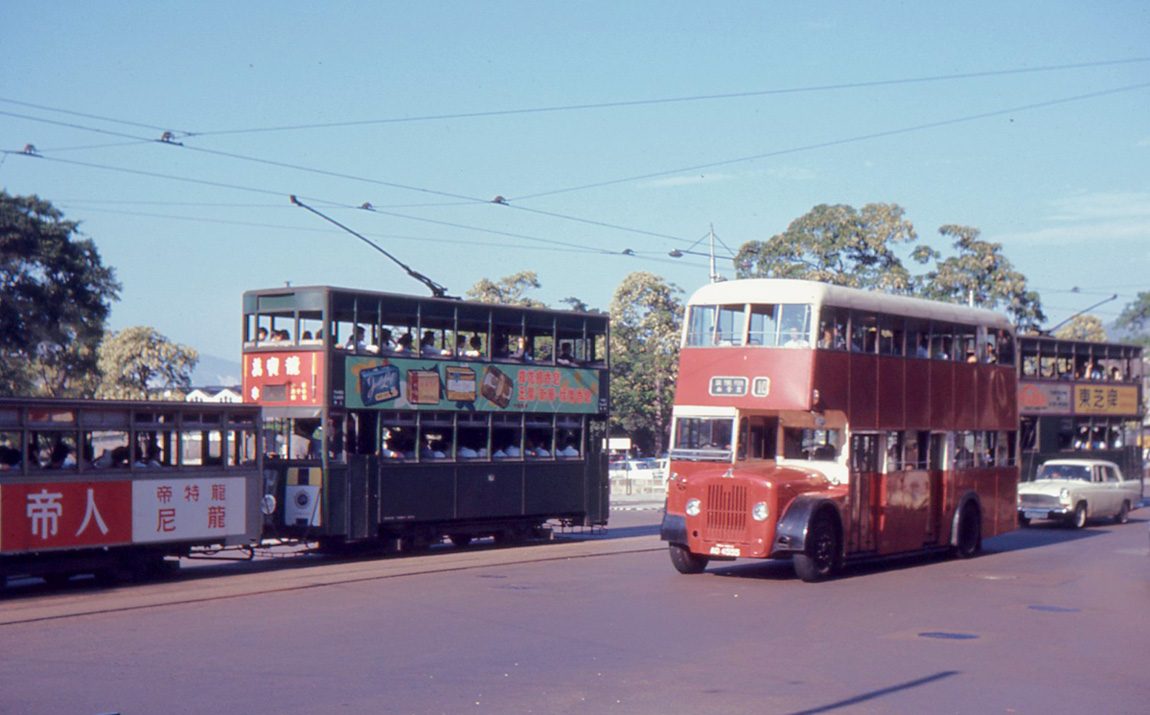
CMB has introduced double-deck buses since 1962, and the picture shows one of the Guy Arab MkV buses.

At the same time, CMB also made a number of innovations under the leadership of Ngan Shing-kwan, including the introduction of the first double-decker bus to Hong Kong Island in 1962, the introduction of the "Jumbo Bus" with a large capacity in 1972, the full implementation of the "one-man-controlled bus" mode to eliminate bus conductors in 1976, the introduction of tri-axle double-deckers with a larger capacity in 1981, and the introduction of double-deckers with air-conditioning in 1990. In addition, after the opening of the Cross Harbour Tunnel linking Hong Kong Island and the Kowloon Peninsula in 1972, CMB and its erstwhile Kowloon rival, KMB, operated cross-harbour tunnel buses separately, and CMB's route network covered the Kowloon area once again. In its heyday, CMB had over 100 bus routes and a fleet of over 1,000 buses, with depots in North Point, Chai Wan and Wong Chuk Hang, etc., making it the "Kingdom of CMB".

In addition to CMB's business, Ngan Shing-kwan had been involved in other business areas since before the war, with roles including chairman of Tai Kwong Newspaper and K. Wah Life Insurance Company, as well as a director of the New Asia Hotel. After the war, he was involved in the founding of the Hongkong Chinese Bank in 1955, led by Yinshang Chau Sik-nin (later Sir), and was elected Vice Chairman, in addition to being a permanent director of the founding bank, until the Chinese Bank was acquired by a consortium of Hong Kong and Southeast Asian joint ventures in 1980. As an overseas Chiu Chow leader in Hong Kong, Ngan Shing-kwan was also invited by the Liu Po-san family of Chiu Chow merchants in 1962 to join the Chong Hing Bank as its chairman, following the bank run of the previous year, and in 1972 was invited to become a part-time vice-chairman of the newly established Liu Chong Hing Investment Limited. He served on the boards of directors of Chong Hing Bank and Chong Hing Enterprise for many years until 1984, when he retired. In addition, Ngan Shing-kwan was a Council Member and Advisor of the Chinese General Chamber of Commerce, Honorary President of the Chinese Manufacturers' Association, Director of Repulse Bay Industrial Company Limited, and in 1962 was invited to be the Director of Maybank Corporation in Hong Kong. He has also held key positions in a number of family companies, including Chairman of Island Express Enterprises Limited, Chairman of Kwan Mui Limited and General Manager of Wing Hing Lung.

However, CMB's development over the years has not been smooth, for example, as early as 1950, there was an incident in which the dismissal of 14 apprentices caused drivers to slacken off; and the issue of staff pensions and remuneration has been a constant problem for CMB. During the 1967 June 7 riots, Ngan Shing-kwan had to deal with the impact of the riots on bus services, in addition to mediating with the labor side over allegations of excessively long working hours and low wages. Among other things, under the planning of the leftist camp, Hong Kong and Kowloon bus drivers launched a general strike in June 1967, during which CMB could only maintain a limited service. In view of this, Ngan Shing-kwan started to recruit a large number of new drivers to fill the vacancies within a short period of time, gave special allowances to those who did not take part in the strike, and employed additional guards to guard the buses for a period of time, which enabled the buses to carry 92% of the passengers as they did before the riot in December of the same year.

In 1981, Ngan Shing-kwan's control over CMB was even more seriously challenged for the first time, when the PALIBURG HOLDINGS LIMITED, owned by Lo Yuk Sui, believed that a number of CMB's factories and dormitory land had considerable development and appreciation potential, and so sniped at CMB. Originally owning 11.1% of the shares of CMB, Paribas successfully purchased a total of 8.1% of the shares of another founder of CMB, Mr. Wong Yiu Nam, and another director of CMB, Mr. Wong Yan, in exchange for the withdrawal of these two persons from the board of directors of CMB, and increased its shareholding to 20.4%, making it the largest independent shareholder with the largest shareholding. Subsequently, Paribas announced a price of HK$35 per share to acquire the shares of CMB, forcing Ngan Shing-kwan to seek the assistance of another Chaozhou businessman, Yeh Meou-tsen's Hsin Chong Properties, to form a new company at $38.5 per share to put forward a partial counter-acquisition of 7% of the shares of the CMB, and commitment to the shareholders of the future to pay high dividends, and ultimately succeeded in repelling the Paribas' hostile takeover bid.

After the acquisition by Paribas, although Mr. Ngan Shing-kwan retained control of CMB, it cost him a lot of money. On the contrary, Paribas took the opportunity to sell its stake in CMB due to CMB's anti-takeover action and made a profit of HK$30 million. Since Wong Yiu Nam's withdrawal from the CMB Board of Directors, Mr. Ngan Shing-kwan has become the only permanent director still in office, and CMB has become increasingly conservative with Ngan Shing-kwan and his children in control of the company's overall situation. In order to control costs, CMB never purchased new vehicles for its fleet between 1984 and 1988, resulting in a deterioration of its service standard. This, coupled with the fact that the opening of the Island Line of the Mass Transit Railway (MTR) in 1985 posed direct competition to CMB, led to a significant drop in the number of passengers for CMB. By 1987, 53 of CMB's 100 bus routes were in the red, casting a shadow over the future of CMB's franchised bus business.

==== Loss of patent ====
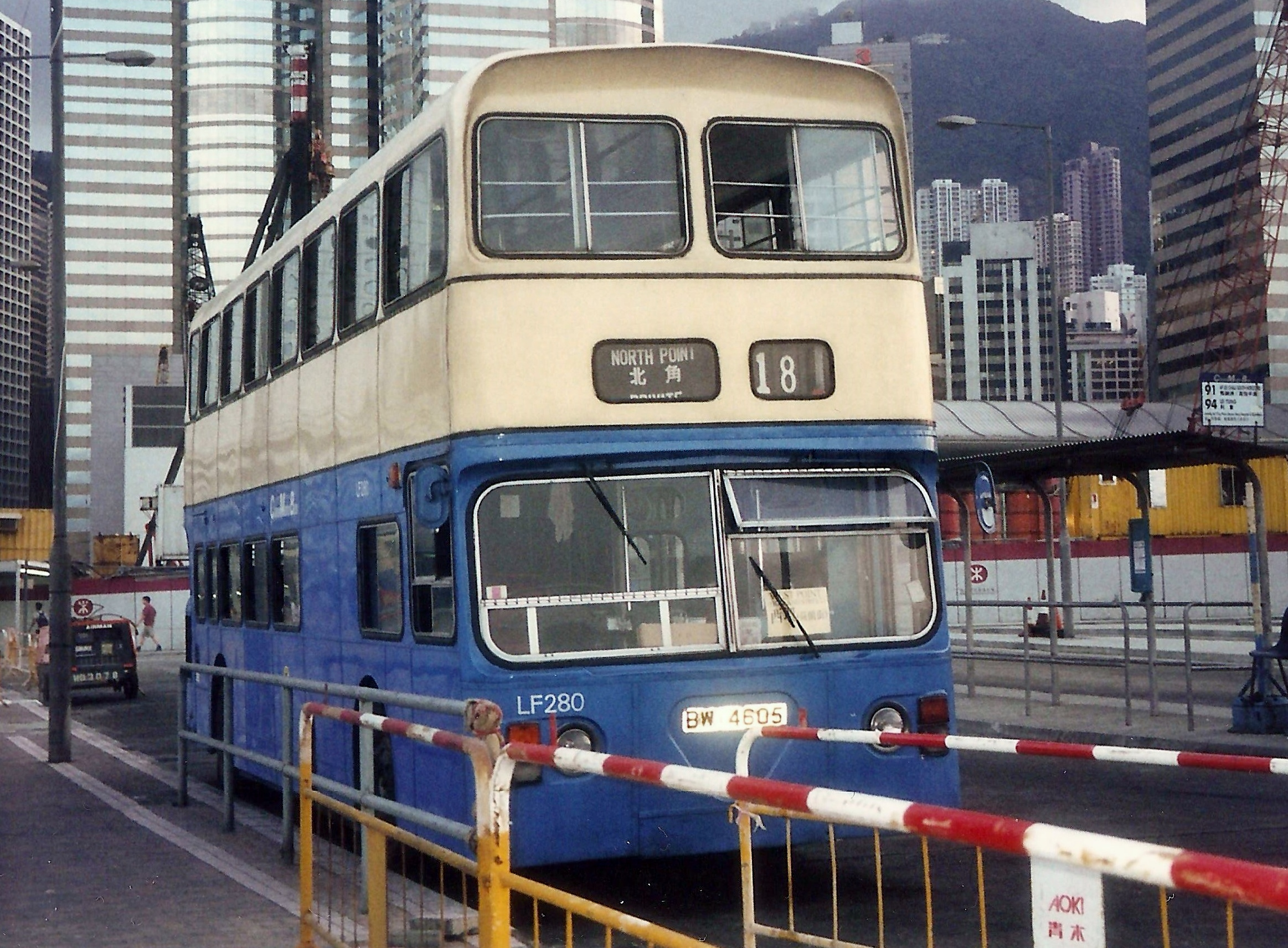
In the late 1970s, the color of the bus body was changed from red to blue. The picture shows a Daimler Fleetline bus parked at the Central Ferry Pier, which was taken on the eve of the loss of CMB's franchise in 1998.

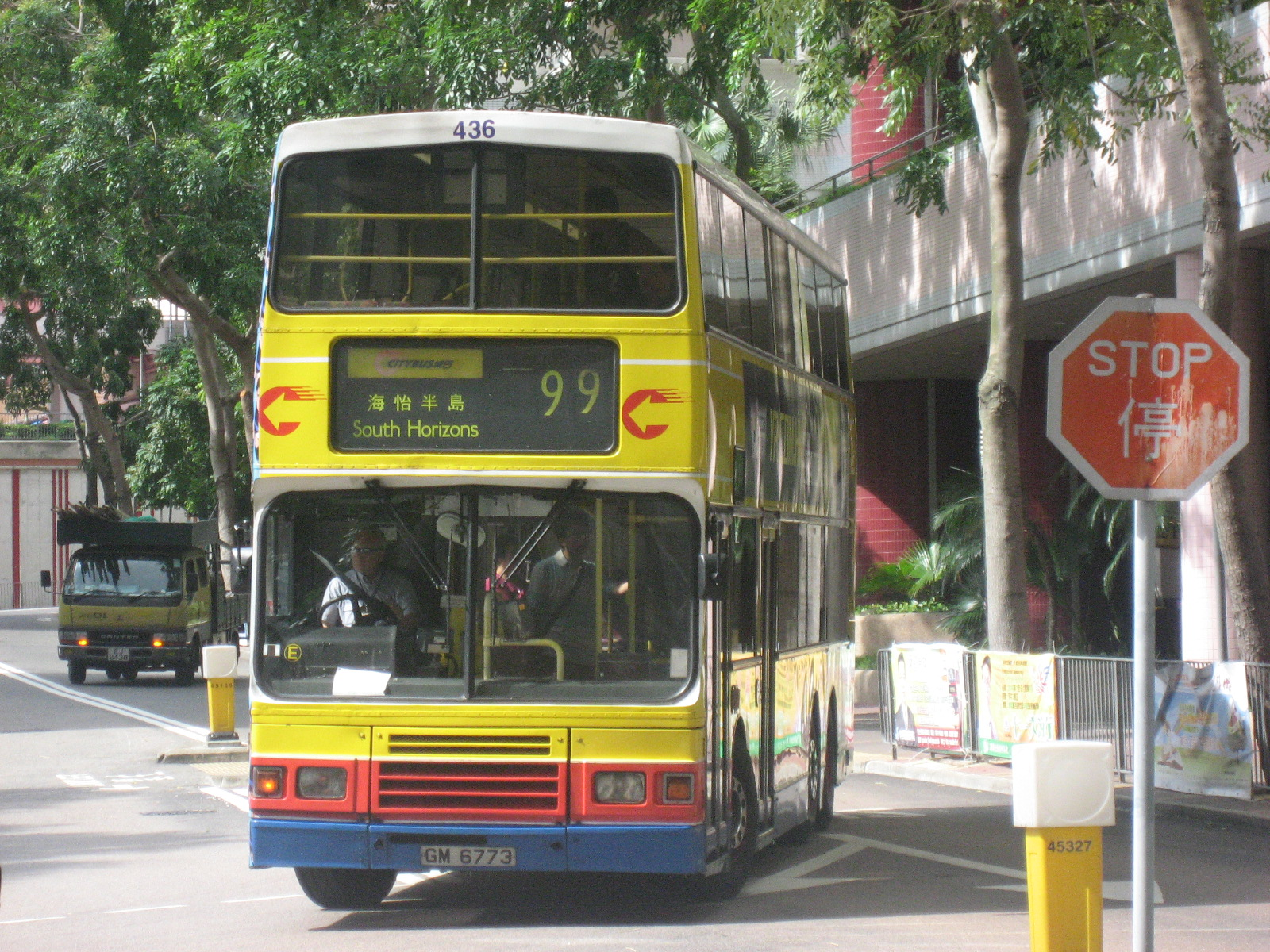
Citybus took over 26 bus routes from CMB in 1993 and 14 more two years later.

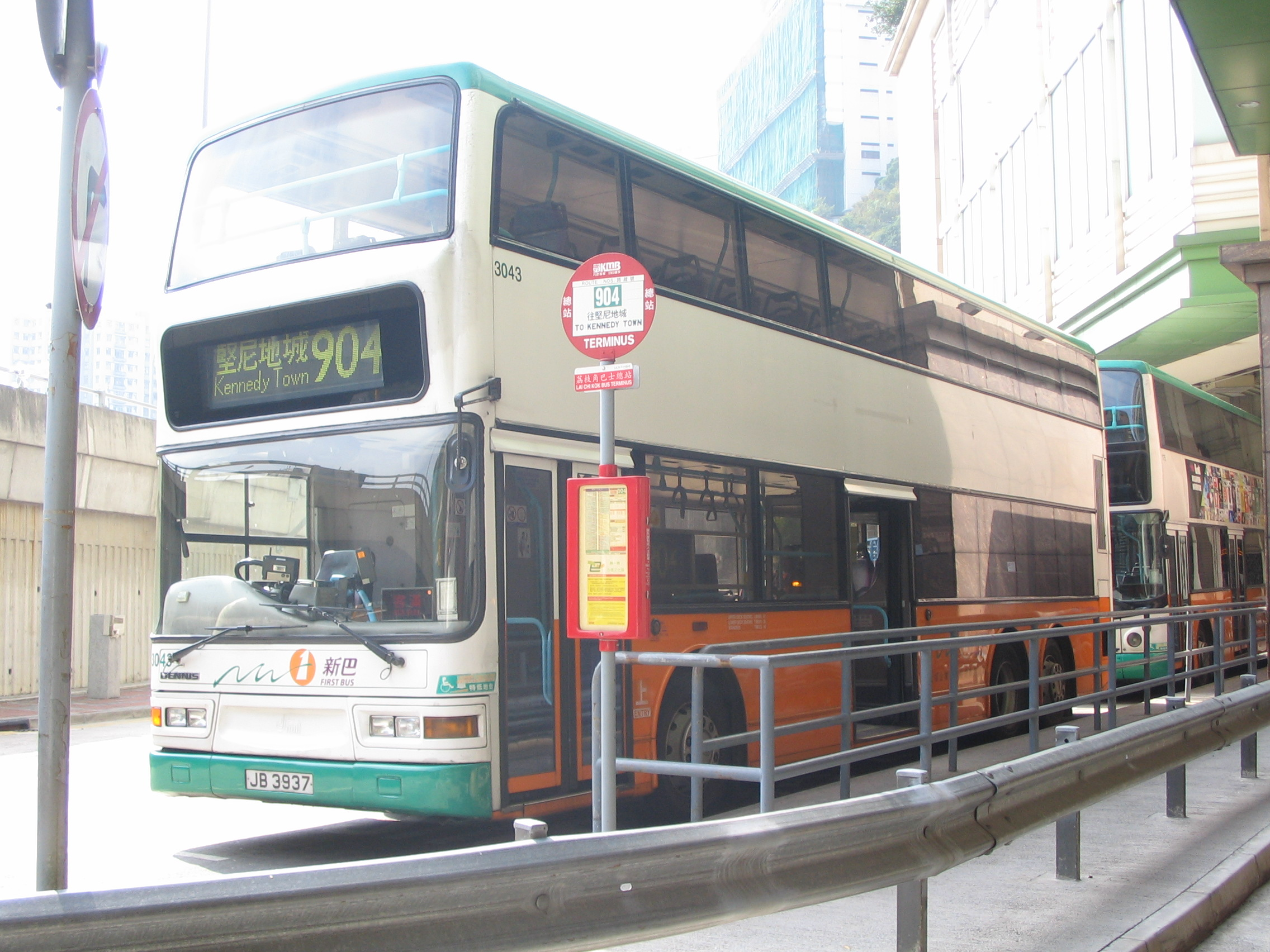
NWFB obtained the franchise in 1998, marking the end of CMB's franchised bus service.

When the Hong Kong Government granted CMB a public bus franchise for Hong Kong Island in 1933, the original stipulation was that it would be valid for 15 years. After the war, the Hong Kong Government re-granted a 10-year franchise to CMB in 1947, which was subsequently extended for three years. In 1960, the Hong Kong Government granted a 15-year franchise to CMB, issued a further 10-year franchise in 1975 and granted early approval in 1978 to extend the franchise to 1987. However, in the 1980s, CMB's service standard was said to have deteriorated, and it was often criticized by the public for its late arrival and departure of buses, its ageing and dilapidated fleet, and the poor hygiene of its bus compartments, which prompted the Hong Kong Government to start a review of CMB's service and governance, and to shorten the renewal of CMB's franchise to once every two years. Many public opinions attributed CMB's governance problems to the family-style governance of CMB by Ngan Shing-kwan and his children, who were considered to be conservative and resistant to change, failing to catch up with the pace of the times. An official of the Transport Department has once criticized in private that the governance of CMB is like an old family business with no future in sight. Elected Legislative Councillor Lau Chin-shek even criticized CMB's headquarters in North Point for being in a state of disrepair, with the interior looking as if it had traveled back in time to the 1950s, questioning the lack of modern bus operation concepts on the part of Ngan Shing-kwan and CMB's management.

In fact, although Ngan Shing-kwan was already 90 years old when he entered the 1990s, he still had a strong grip on CMB and personally returned to the headquarters every day to take care of the business, sometimes working 11 hours a day. However, as CMB's governance problems worsened, public opinion criticized him for becoming low-key, stubborn and calculating. He was heavily employed by the Hong Kong Government in the 1950s and 1960s, but by this time he had already stepped down from most of his public offices for some time, and his relationship with the Hong Kong Government was not as close as it used to be. It was rumored that he had once refused to meet with officials of the Transport Department, and was even described as "living in his own fantasies". (Note: It is alleged that the Secretary for Transport of the Hong Kong Government, Mr. Bowen, after assuming office in 1993, together with the concurrently serving Commissioner for Transport, Mr. Rafael Hui, went to the headquarters of the China Motor Bus Company Limited (CMB) to pay a visit to Mr. Ngan Shing-kwan in person, but after waiting for one hour, he was refused to meet with him. However, there is also information that Ngan Shing-kwan has not made any public appearances since he chaired the last CMB AGM in 1992, so the authenticity of the claim is doubtful.) In addition, Ngan Shing-kwan appointed his daughter, Ngan Kit-ling, as the executive director of CMB, but Ngan Kit-ling was considered to have poor relations with the labor side and the government. There were rumors that Ngan Kit-ling liked to meet with Transport Department officials late at night, and treat them to overnight cakes; and that she once scared off labor representatives by hitting water cups with an iron ruler during labor strike negotiations. There were also rumors that the Hong Kong government had once privately asked Ngan Kit Ling by name to resign as CMB's executive director, but was refused. The unfavorable rumors about the management of CMB from outside have shown that the various governance problems of CMB have already laid the groundwork for the Hong Kong Government to terminate the franchise of CMB.

The revocation of CMB's franchise by the Hong Kong Government is, to a certain extent, also related to CMB's internal labour disputes. For a long time, the labour side of the CMB has been criticizing the poor remuneration package in which employees are only given a year-end bonus equivalent to half a month's salary each year. A bus driver who has completed 20 years of service will receive a monthly salary just $1,000 more than a newly recruited driver. Employees who retire after 30 years of service are even entitled to a pension of only $20,000. CMB's rest stops for employees don't even have water or electricity. Ngan Shing-kwan is very nervous about CMB's salary and benefit expenses, and every year he must personally preside over a closed-door meeting with the labor side on salary adjustments, sometimes arguing over adjustments of as little as 20 cents. The long-standing discontent of the staff eventually triggered a strike by CMB drivers on two consecutive days in November 1989 in the form of collective "compensatory leave" to protest against CMB's pension and welfare policy, resulting in the paralysis of traffic on Hong Kong Island. Although Ngan Shing-kwan reached a new pension agreement with the labor side in December of the same year, which enabled the employees to receive a pension several times more than before, the incident fully exposed CMB's long-standing governance problems, prompting the Hong Kong government to require CMB to conduct a review of its internal governance.

In 1990, KPMG, commissioned by Ngan Shing-kwan, completed an internal review of CMB's governance, but the KPMG report only recommended the hiring of additional staff at certain grades and the appropriate upgrading of internal staff. Nevertheless, the Legislative Council Panel on Transport is of the view that CMB should push for further reforms, recommending that CMB should create the posts of General Manager and other middle management positions, and separate the Board of Directors from the management in the long run, so as to de-emphasize family governance. However, Mr. Ngan argued that KPMG's report did not make the relevant recommendations and that the existing management of CMB had sufficient experience to cope with the day-to-day operation of CMB, and objected to each and every one of the Legislative Council's recommendations. At that time, there were already voices in the community suggesting that the Hong Kong Government could consider granting a franchise to the Citybus Limited (Citybus), which mainly operates non-franchised residents' bus services, to operate some of the bus routes on Hong Kong Island, so as to introduce healthy competition. However, Ngan Shing-kwan said that when he won the franchise in 1933, he did not know that there would be a new competitor, and considered that the proposal would infringe on the rights and interests of CMB and strongly opposed it. However, in view of CMB's uncooperative attitude and the persistent lack of significant improvement in its service standard, the Hong Kong Government decided for the first time in 1992 whether CMB's franchise should be renewed upon its expiry in August 1993 by way of a public consultation exercise. After the incident, although the Hong Kong Government agreed to extend CMB's franchise for two years, it handed over 26 of CMB's bus routes to Citybus for the first time. Among the 26 routes, 16 of the most profitable routes in the Southern District are also included. This new arrangement has directly led to a drastic drop of 50 million in the total number of passenger trips made by CMB from about 250 million in 1992–1993 to only about 200 million in 1993–1994.

By this time, Ngan Shing Kwan, whose health was deteriorating, had faded away, leaving the three siblings, Ngan Kit Ling, Ngan Kit Keung, who was the Deputy Supervisor of CMB, and Ngan Henry, who was the Director of CMB, in charge of CMB's day-to-day operations. However, the three Ngan sisters were accused of being unmotivated to run their father's franchised bus business, and the service standard of CMB had not improved. As a result, the Hong Kong Government, while renewing CMB's franchise for three years in September 1995, handed over 14 routes of CMB to Citybus to take over the operation of CMB, thus causing the total number of passengers of CMB to drop by a further 5%, and further reducing the total number of passengers to about 177.5 million by the year 1996–97. On the other hand, CMB's labor-management relations have not improved as a result of the implementation of the recommendations of the KPMG report, and labor disputes have become even more frequent after Ngan Shing-kwan faded out. For example, CMB announced that it would lay off 170 employees immediately after 26 bus routes were cut in August 1993, and the employees were dissatisfied with the compensation arrangements and at one time went on strike, which was only settled after the Labour Department intervened to mediate the dispute. In October 1996, the CMB labor side, dissatisfied with the small salary increase, brewed a strike for two days, which eventually forced the employer to settle. In November 1997, the CMB suddenly dismissed 45 employees, and at one point, the labour side warned of a general strike, but the crisis was only resolved through the Government's mediation and the convening of negotiations between employers and employees.

In the mid-1990s, CMB's services continued to show no improvement, and this, coupled with poor labor relations, finally sounded the alarm for its franchise. In April 1997, when CMB failed to submit an application for renewal of its franchise before the expiry of the deadline as required by law, the Hong Kong Government stated for the first time that it would consider terminating CMB's franchise and putting all its routes up for open tender. Although CMB later submitted a renewal application, the media rumored that the Ngan family was no longer interested in operating CMB's fleet, and even planned to cease operation early on 30 June 1997, following the end of British rule, as the handover of sovereignty of Hong Kong was approaching at that time. After the establishment of the Hong Kong Special Administrative Region (HKSAR), CMB did not cease operation as rumored, but the HKSAR Government delayed announcing whether or not to extend the franchise of CMB. On 6 January 1998, the Transport Department (TD) revealed that it agreed in principle to renew CMB's franchise and would not put its bus routes up for open bidding. However, on 19 January, the Transport Bureau changed its statement to say that it had recommended to the Executive Council the conditional renewal of the CMB franchise and the possible reduction of 23 more bus routes. However, the Transport Bureau suddenly announced on 17 February of the same year that the Executive Council had decided not to renew the franchise of CMB and immediately put 88 of its routes up for open tender, while the other 13 routes were handed over to the Kowloon Motor Bus Company (1933) Limited (KMB) and the Citybus Limited (Citybus), and the remaining 11 routes which had too low a patronage would be discontinued upon the expiry of the franchise.

In a subsequent public tender, although CMB entered the bidding in partnership with the British Stagecoach Group in an attempt to regain the franchise, the franchise was ultimately won by New World Development Company Limited in conjunction with the British First Group. The New World First Bus Services Limited (NWFB), a joint venture between the two companies, officially took over CMB's franchised bus service in the early hours of 1 September 1998 upon the expiry of CMB's franchise, and the 65 years of CMB's franchised bus service has since become history. In fact, long before the loss of the franchise, the Ngan family had already focused its attention on the property development business in Hong Kong and the United Kingdom, and many of the sites originally owned by CMB for its depots and staff quarters were redeveloped for sale as residential estates or commercial buildings. In 1997, CMB's net profit was as high as HK$833 million and its market value was as high as $3.1 billion. However, most of the revenue actually came from property development projects, while the net assets of the franchised bus business accounted for only 7.4%, and the profit brought in by the business only accounted for 25.8% of the total revenue, so it is evident that the franchised bus business is no longer valued by the Ngan's.

=== Public service ===
==== Pre-war work ====
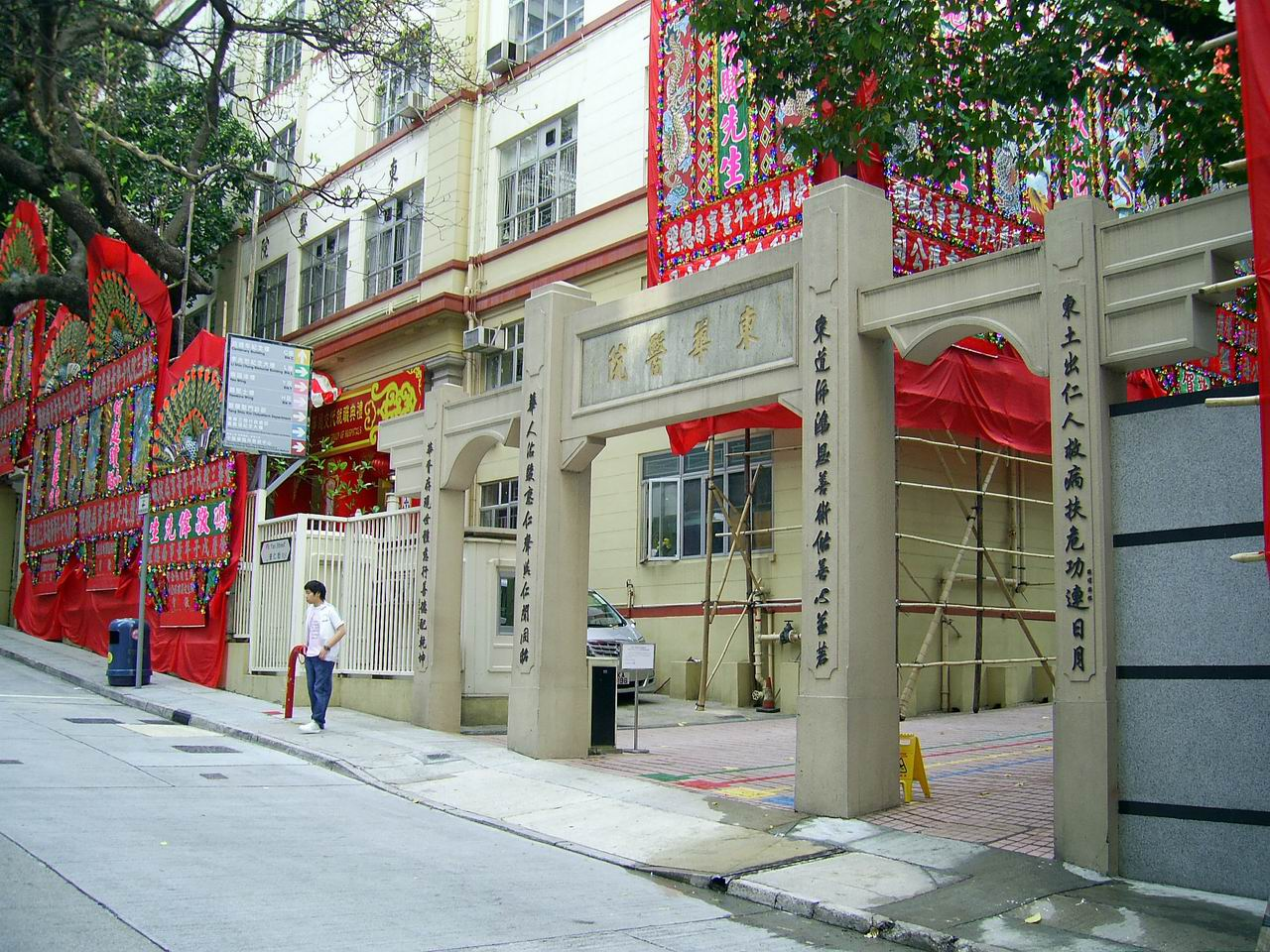
Ngan Shing-kwan was elected the first Chairman of Tung Wah Group of Hospitals in 1931.

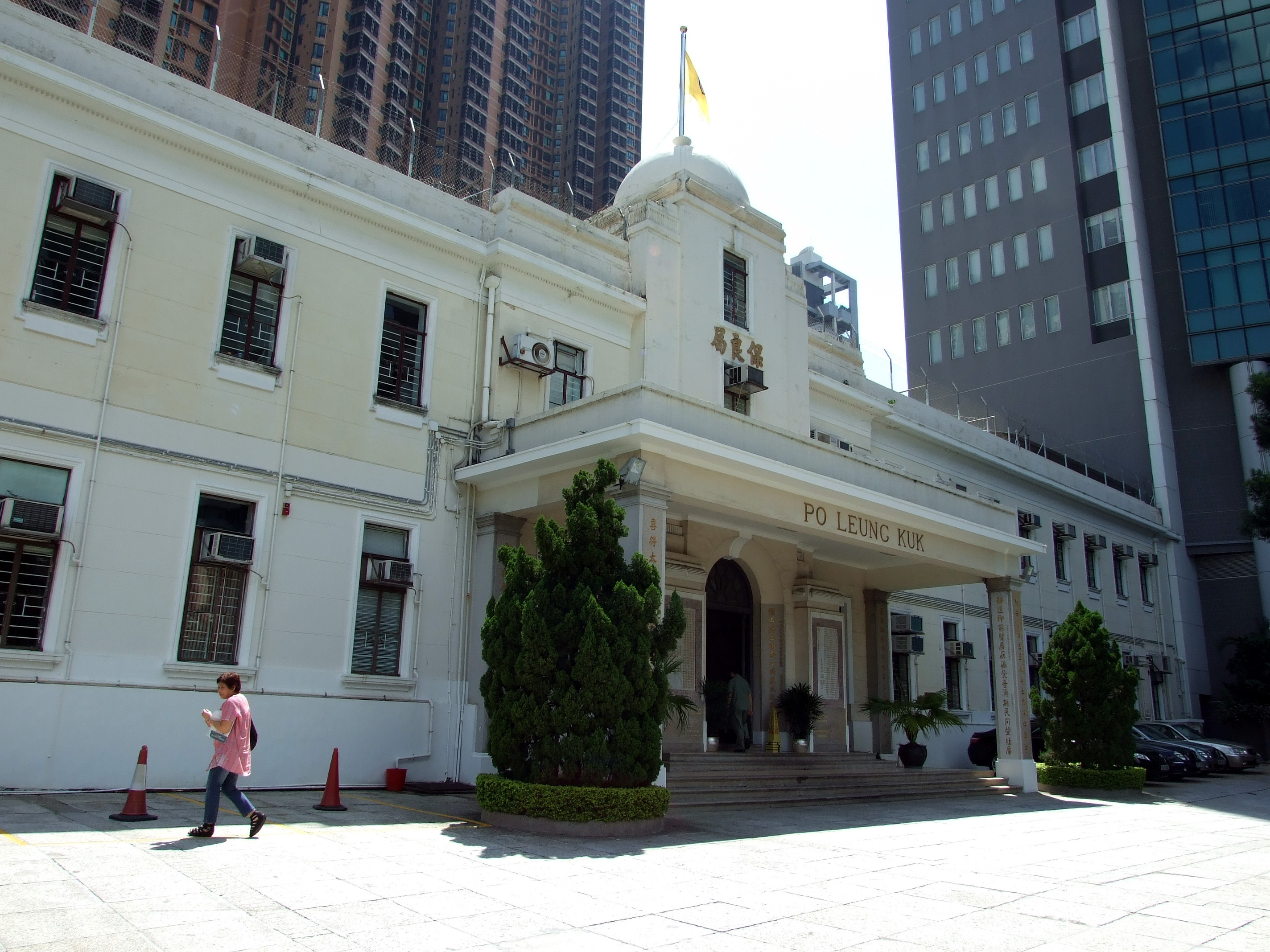
Ngan Shing-kwan was the chairman of the Po Leung Kuk in 1939–1940.

Ngan Shing-kwan has been active in community affairs since he founded CMB. Originally from Kowloon, he was elected by his neighbours as the General Manager of the Kwong Wah Hospital in 1926–1927 in the year B3, and then as the chairman of the hospital in the year D4 in 1927–1928, and during his tenure, he pushed for the establishment of a new maternity ward for the Kwong Wah Hospital. From 1927 to 1928, he was a member of the Tung Wah Eastern Hospital Preparatory Committee, which led to the opening of Tung Wah Eastern Hospital in 1929. In 1931, the Tung Wah Hospital, Kwong Wah Hospital and Tung Wah Eastern Hospital were merged to form the Tung Wah Group of Hospitals, resulting in Ngan Shing-kwan being elected as the chairman of the Tung Wah Group of Hospitals for the year of Xinwei, the first chairman of the Group, by a vote of 13 to 12 against his rival, Lian-bo Chen. During his tenure, in addition to establishing a women's voluntary school, he also set up a tuberculosis convalescent ward and an operating theatre at Kwong Wah Hospital, and presided over the repatriation of unemployed overseas Chineses. The social services provided by the three hospitals also recorded a surplus of over HK$17,000. In addition, the Mainland China regions of Northern China and Northern Guangdong were plagued by flooding at the time, so under the leadership of Ngan Shing-kwan, the three hospitals raised a total of HK$440,000 for disaster relief. After stepping down as Chairman of the Tung Wah Group of Hospitals in 1932, he, together with Law Man Kam (later Sir) and Chan Lian Pok, was appointed by the Hong Kong Government as the Special Administrator of the three hospitals in 1933, with the responsibility of reviewing and reorganising the affairs of the three hospitals. Ngan Shing-kwan's deep connection with the three hospitals led to his appointment in 1950, many years later, as a permanent adviser to the Tung Wah Group of Hospitals.

Other pre-war positions held by Ngan Shing-kwan included serving as a member of the Council for the Defence of the Armed Forces from 1932 to 1933, as a committee member of the Four Rings Reinforcements committee from 1932 to 1941, and as a member of the Hong Kong Government's Licensing Board from 1937 to 1941; he was also invite to serve as a Standing Committee Member of the Hong Kong Branch of the National Salvation Bonds in 1937. In addition, Ngan Shing-kwan, a Christian, participated in the founding of the Chinese YMCA of Hong Kong as early as 1932, and served as its founding board member as well as a vice-president during the pre-war period; he also served as a member of the National General Assembly of the Chinese Christian Church and the National Association of the YMCA of Hong Kong, and as an executive committee member of the Hong Kong Association of Chinese Young Men in Society. The National Council of the Church of Christ in China, Guangdong Association District Council No. 6, Vice-Patron of the Hong Kong St. John Ambulance Association, Finance Committee Member of the Chinese Reserve Police Force, director of the Christian newspaper Daikuang Pao (being the last surviving ex-director of the newspaper since Yinshang Wang Guoxuan died in 1974, and, from 1940 to 1941, a member of the board of trustees of the Hong Kong Association of the Church of Christ in China. On 27 April 1932, Ngan Shing-kwan was also awarded an unofficial Justice of the Peace by the Hong Kong Government, in recognition of his participation in public service.

==== Post-war public service ====
After the end of the Second World War, Ngan Shing-kwan was reappointed by the Hong Kong government in the 1940s and 1960s, when he was appointed as one of the first non-official councillors of the Urban Council of Hong Kong after the war in May 1946, In February 1951, he succeeded the resigned Lo Man Wai as the Principal Unofficial Member of the Urban Council. In the Urban Council, he was particularly concerned about municipal livelihood issues such as hawker and market management, as well as the collection of nocturnal odours. He also put forward favourable suggestions such as the construction of more public baths and the improvement of public toilets. He had served on the Urban Council for seven years before he resigned in April 1953 on the grounds of heavy public service. It was not until April 1953 that he resigned on the grounds that his duties were onerous. In addition to the Urban Council, Ngan Shing-kwan was appointed a non-official member of the Legislative Council of Hong Kong by then Governor of Hong Kong Sir Grantham in July 1951, and was then known as the ‘Representative of the Chinese People’; during his term of office he was more concerned about the livelihood of the community, and repeatedly advocated for the construction of more low-cost housing and the expansion of primary and secondary school places. During his tenure, he was more concerned about people's livelihood and repeatedly advocated for the construction of more low-cost housing and the expansion of primary and secondary school places. In fact, Ngan Shing-kwan, who had a special interest in education, believed that ‘investing in education pays the best returns’, and so he had been a director of Ying Wa College, Ying Wa Girls' School, Minsheng College, and Shantou Hong Kong Business Volunteer School before the war as well as a member of the board of trustees of Guangzhou, and Guangzhou, Guangzhou, Guangzhou, Guangzhou, Guangzhou and Guangzhou. Guangzhou]] and Jishi Middle School, as well as an honorary member of the Guangzhou Jishi Middle School. After the war, he was a member of the board of trustees of Aberdeen Technical School from 1951 to 1953, as well as a member of the boards of trustees of Hong Kong Pui Ying Secondary School, Hong Kong True Light Middle School, Unity Church School in Kowloon, and Shue Yan College. He was appointed a member of the University of Hong Kong Council in 1951 and a member of the Board of Education in 1952, and was invited to serve as an Honorary President of the newly formed Young Teachers' Association in 1959. He was also a member of the Council of United College and Chung Chi College of The Chinese University of Hong Kong after its founding in 1963, and was also a member of the Board of Trustees of The Chinese University of Hong Kong, which was founded in 1968, and was a member of the Board of Trustees of The Chinese University of Hong Kong. Apart from livelihood issues such as housing and education, Ngan Shing-kwan was also particularly interested in economic issues in the Legislative Council, and had attended a number of regional economic conferences of the United Nations Economic Commission for Asia and the Far East as Hong Kong's delegate, including a trip to Burma Yangon in 1952 together with another unofficial Member of the Legislative Council, Lo Man-wai, to attend the Eighth Session of the commission, to attend the Seventh Meeting of the Chamber's Commerce and Industry Committee in Japan Tokyo before 1955, In 1956, as Hong Kong's Chief Representative, he travelled with another non-official Member of the Legislative Council, C. E. M. Terry (C. E. M. Terry) and others to India Bangalore to attend the Eighth Meeting of the Commerce and Industry Commission, and in 1959, with Deputy Financial Secretary (later Sir) Kwok Pak-wai as Secretary, to attend the Far East Economic Forum in India, And in 1959, he travelled to Thailand Bangkok with Deputy Financial Secretary Kwok Pak Wai, later Sir, as Secretary, to attend the Second Session of the Trade Commission. In July 1959, Ngan Shing-kwan succeeded the outgoing Chow Sik-nin as the Principal Unofficial Member of the Legislative Council, and as the head of the ‘Teochew Gang’, he was in a position of rivalry with the other Chinese members of the council. In May 1959, Ngan Shing-kwan was further appointed by the Governor of Hong Kong, Sir Robert Black, as an unofficial member of the Executive Council as a non-official member of the Hong Kong Executive Council, at one time serving as a member of both the Executive Council and the Legislative Council, and it was not until May and June 1961 that he stepped down from the Executive Council and the Legislative Council respectively. The Appointment of Martin Lee, Kwan Cho Yiu, and Kei Tak Chun as Unofficial Members of the Executive Council, and the Expiry of the Terms of Office of Honourable Ngan Shing-kwan, Tai Lei, and Lo Man-wai.(31 May 1961)

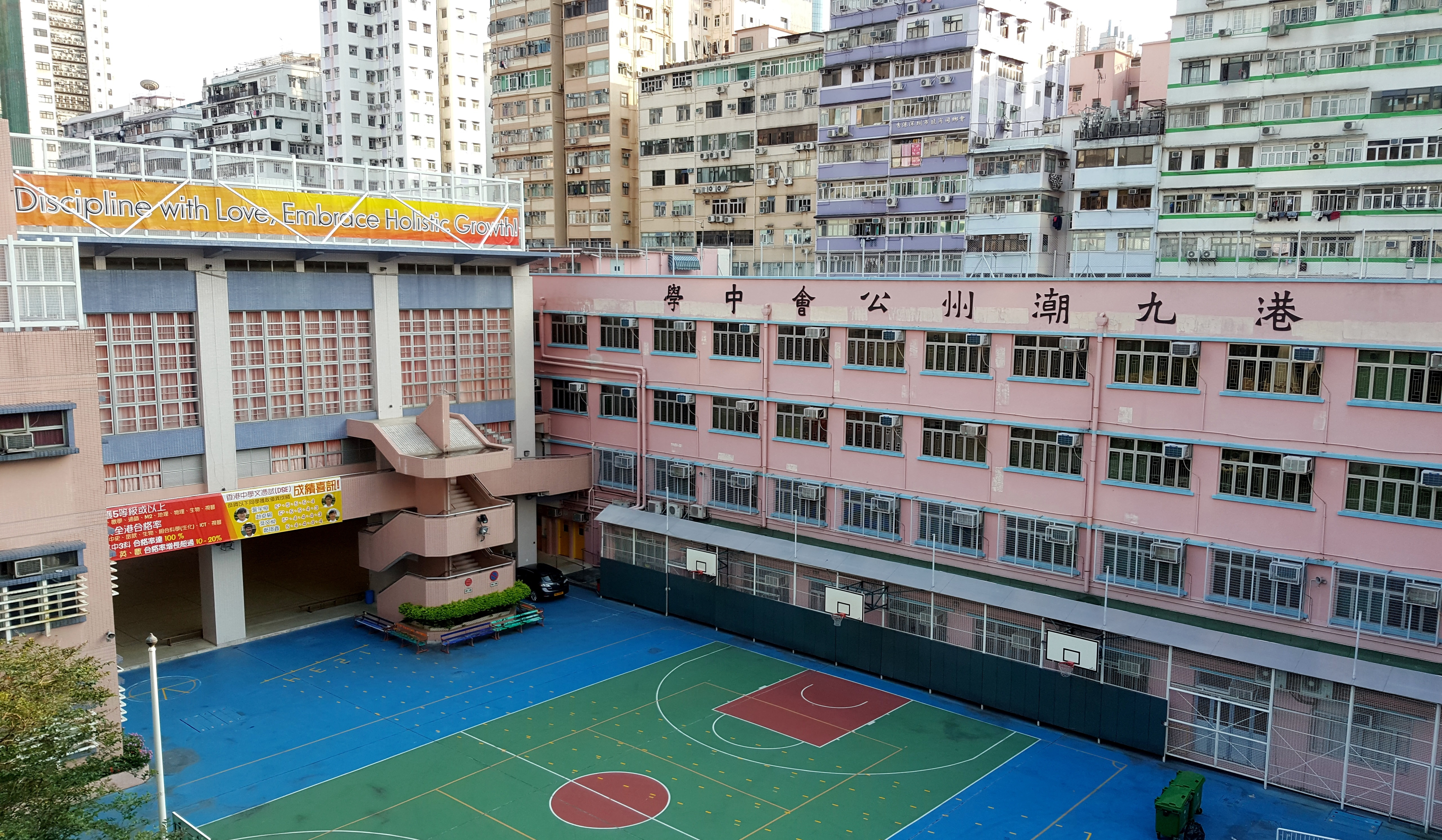
The Hong Kong & Kowloon Chiu Chow Public Association Secondary School, organised under the auspices of Ngan Shing-kwan, is situated in Kowloon Mongkok Laundry Street

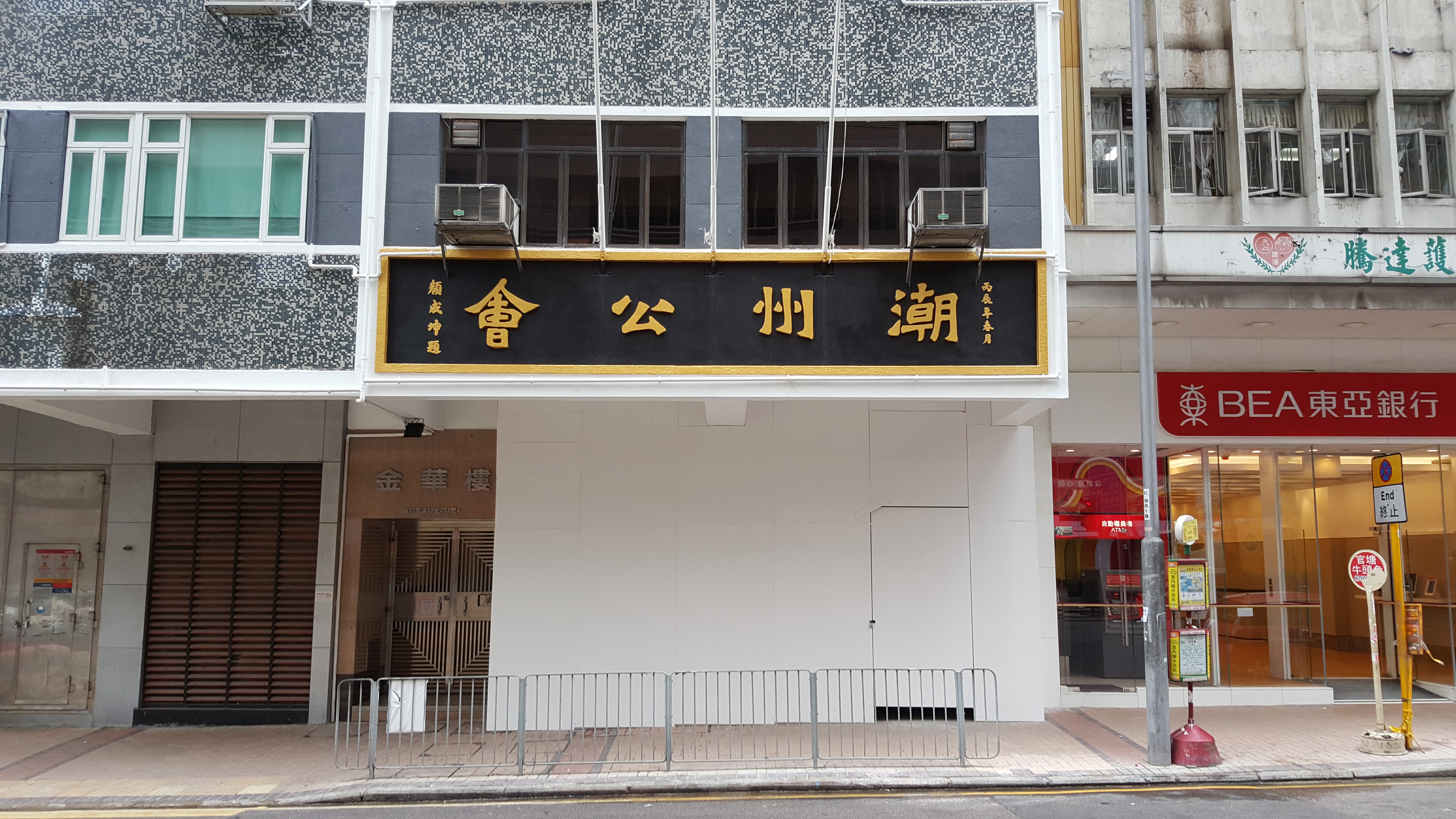
Hong Kong Kowloon Chiu Chow Association is located at Waterloo Road, Ho Man Tin, Kowloon, with a plaque of the Association inscribed by Ngan Shing-kwan in 1976

During his tenure in the Urban Council and the Executive and Legislative Councils, Ngan Shing-kwan was active in promoting charitable and public service in Hong Kong. He participated in the founding of the Hong Kong Tuberculosis Association in 1948 and served as a director of the association; He participated in the founding of the Hong Kong Branch of the Leprosy Relief International in 1951, serving as a committee member and chief executive officer; Chairman of the Alice Ho Miu Ling Nethersole Hospital from 1956 to 1958; and President of the British Red Cross Hong Kong from 1956 to 1959, and later a member of its Board of Advisors, and appointed Vice-Patron from 1990 to 1997, were also appointed over the years. Ngan Shing-kwan also served as vice-president of the Hong Kong Society for the Protection of Children in the 1950s and 1960s (having served as a member of its executive committee before the war), vice-president of the Hong Kong Playground Association, Supervisor and vice-chairman of the Wan Chai Kai-fong Welfare Association, and Honorary President of the North Point Kai-fong Welfare Association, among others. He was also involved with the Rotary Club of Hong Kong's Eastern District, where he served as vice president in 1947. He was also involved with the Rotary Club of Hong Kong East, and became vice-president in 1947; although he withdrew in 1953 due to heavy public service, he was invited by the Rotary Club of Hong Kong East to become an honorary member in 1955. As a parishioner of the Unity Church of the Church of Christ in China, Ngan Shing-kwan was an active supporter of its ministries for many years, and he was responsible for the founding of the Unity Church of Kowloon and the school in 1957, as well as the founding of the Unity Church of North Point in 1984, which he helped to raise funds for. Ngan Shing-kwan was also appointed by the Hong Kong Government to a number of public offices outside the OMELCO, including serving again as a member of the Licensing Board from 1946 to 1953, a member of the Government's Civil Servants Salaries Commission of Inquiry in 1947, a member of the Transport Advisory Committee from 1951 to 1958, a member of the British Monarch Queen Queen Elizabeth II's Coronation General Committee in 1953, a member of the Chinese Playgrounds Commission from 1951 to 1961 (later renamed Honorary President), and a member of the Chinese Playgrounds Commission from 1952 to 1964, a member of the Chinese Playgrounds Commission from 1951 to 1961, a member of the Chinese Playgrounds Commission from 1951 to 1961, and an Honorary President. Coronation General Committee in 1953, a member of the Chinese Playground Committee from 1951 to 1961 (later changed to Honorary President), a member of the Board of Management of the Chinese Permanent Cemeteries from 1952 to 1964, and a vice-president of the Hong Kong Branch of the Commonwealth Parliamentary Association from 1959 to 1961, among others. Other public appointments made by the Hong Kong government include serving as a member of the Chinese Temples Committee and a member of its Chinese Charities Fund Committee since 1946, a member of the Hong Kong War Graves Commission since 1947, and a member of the Hong Kong War Graves Fund Committee since 1948. Fund]] since 1947, a member of the Brewin Trust Fund Committee since 1955, a member of the Chinese Advisory Board, a member of the Tenancy Tribunal and a member of the Narcotics Control Advisory Board.

As a Chiu Chow overseas Chinese leader in Hong Kong, Ngan Shing-kwan joined the Hong Kong Chiu Chow Chamber of Commerce as early as 1933, serving as a director and honorary advisor, and as permanent honorary president of the Chamber since 1962. He also served as Honorary Advisor to the Hong Kong Kowloon Chiu Chow Association, and was elected Permanent Honorary President in 1960, Under his presidency, the Association organised the construction of the Hong Kong and Kowloon Chiu Chow Public School in Mong Kok Sai Yee Street in 1955. After the founding of the school in 1957, Ngan Shing-kwan was elected by the public to serve as the chairman of the School Management Committee (SMC), and in 1960 he was honoured to be appointed as the chairman of the SMC in perpetuity. In 1961, he further promoted the addition of a secondary section to the school, and in addition to personally chairing the fund-raising committee, he also took the lead in donating more than HK$100,000 to enable the establishment of the secondary section in the same year, which was known as the Hong Kong and Kowloon Chiu Chow Association Secondary School. In addition to the above organisations, Ngan Shing-kwan also held a number of other positions related to the Chiu Chow community, including being invited to serve as an honorary advisor to the newly established Chiu Chow Foodstuffs Merchants' Association as a permanent member of its honorary advisor in 1959, as well as permanent honorary president of the Hong Kong Retailers and Rice Merchants Association, advisor and permanent honorary president of the Hong Kong Chiu Yeung Clansmen's Association, and board member of the Chiu Chau Pat Yap Chamber of Commerce.

In recognition of Ngan Shing-kwan's many years of public service and charitable work, he has been honoured by the British Government on several occasions: the OBE and CBE in 1955 and 1961, and the Queen Elizabeth II Coronation Medal and the Queen Elizabeth II Silver Jubilee Medal in 1953 and 1977, respectively. However, since Ngan Shing-kwan's retirement from the Executive and Legislative Councils in 1961, he has kept a low profile, holding fewer and fewer public appointments and no longer being as active in public as he was in the past, a marked departure from his former style.
