= DHC =

DHC may refer to:

== Arts and entertainment ==
- Dance Hall Crashers, a popular Ska punk band
  - "DHC" is the final song on the band's debut album of the same name (1990)
- Discovery Health Channel, part of US Discovery television channel

== Aviation ==
- De Havilland Canada, Canadian aircraft manufacturer:
  - de Havilland Canada (1928–1986), former Canadian aircraft manufacturer established in 1928
  - DHC-1 Chipmunk
  - DHC-2 Beaver
  - DHC-3 Otter
  - DHC-4 Caribou
  - DHC-5 Buffalo
  - DHC-6 Twin Otter
  - DHC-7 Dash 7
  - DHC-8 Dash 8

== Business ==
- Daigaku Honyaku Center, a Japanese manufacturer of cosmetics and health foods
- Dalian Hi-Think Computer, a Chinese outsourcing company
- DHC Software, a Chinese company

== Chemistry ==
- Dihydrocapsaicin, a capsaicinoid occurring in pepper
- Dihydrochalcone, a chemical compound
- Dihydrocodeine, an opioid analgesic

== Sports ==
- Dudley Hewitt Cup, Canadian ice hockey trophy
- Xerxes/DHC, a former Dutch professional football team

== Other ==
- Dave's Hot Chicken
- District heating and Cooling
- Diocese of the Holy Cross, of the US Anglican Church
- Doctor honoris causa, an honorary degree
- Drop-Head Coupe, a British term for a convertible car
- Brave New World Linda's father
