= TWEH =

TWEH or Tweh may refer to:

- Tung Wah Eastern Hospital, a hospital in Causeway Bay, Hong Kong
- David Tweh, a Liberian footballer
