= Tung Wah Group of Hospitals Lo Kon Ting Memorial College =

Educational institution in Hong Kong

- 東華三院盧幹庭紀念中學
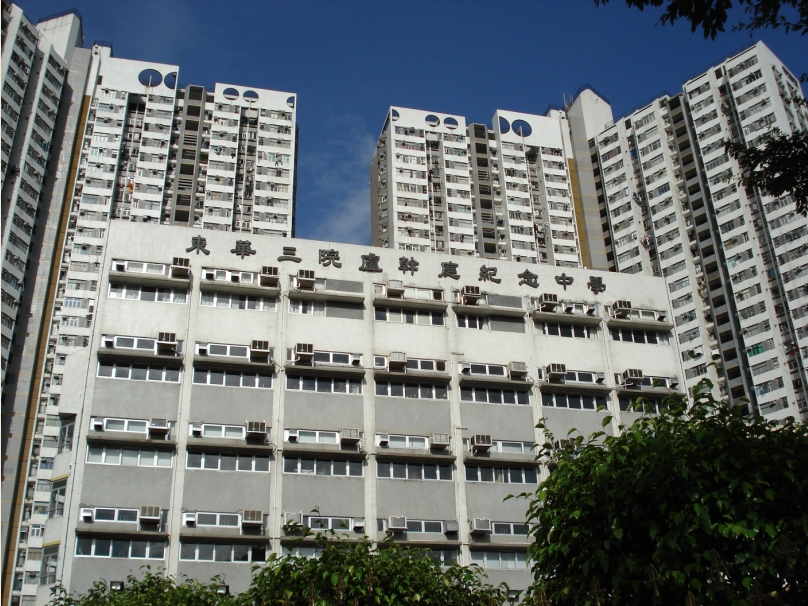
- Pictured in 2009

Location
- Phase III, Long Ping Estate, Yuen Long, New Territories; Hong Kong; 22.449312°N 114.022089°E

Information
- Former name: Tung Wah Group of Hospitals Number Fifteen School
- School type: Aided Secondary school
- Motto: Diligence, Frugality, Loyalty and Faithfulness (勤、儉、忠、信)
- Established: 1987
- School district: Yuen Long District
- Chairperson: Chan Katherine
- Principal: Chong Yat Sau
- Teaching staff: 60 (as of 2019)
- Key people: Lo Kon-ting
- Years: 6
- Gender: Co-educational
- Classes: 24 (as of 2019)
- Language: Predominantly English
- Campus size: About 4700 m²
- Houses: Diligence (red); Frugality (yellow); Loyalty (blue); Faithfulness (purple)
- Affiliation: Tung Wah Group of Hospitals
- Alumni: Ho Hoi-lam
- Website: www.lktmc.edu.hk

Tung Wah Group of Hospitals Lo Kon Ting Memorial College (Chinese: 東華三院盧幹庭紀念中學) is a Hong Kong secondary school. Completely funded by the Government of Hong Kong, the grammar school is one of the two secondary schools located in Long Ping Estate. Most of the school's subjects are taught in English, with few exceptions like Liberal Studies and Visual Arts. Established and governed by the Tung Wah Group of Hospitals, the oldest and largest charitable organisation in Hong Kong, the school had 24 classes, as of 2019.

== History ==
Initially named Tung Wah Group of Hospitals Number Fifteen School upon its establishment in 1987, the school is the fifteenth secondary school established by the Tung Wah Group of Hospitals. The school was then bestowed its current name from the Tung Wah Group of Hospitals after receiving a donation from family of Lo Kon-ting, a Jewellery company founder, under the name of Lo Wing Yip Tong.

Shortly after suffering a stroke, Yim Chin-ming, then-principal of the school, died on 11 May 2013. He was succeeded by Lam Chi-ming, then-vice-principal of Tung Wah Group of Hospitals Kap Yan Directors' College, in October 2013. Lam is the incumbent principal of the school.

== Notable people ==
- Ho Hoi-lam, an alumna of the school, scored 8 As, a level 5 in English and a 5* in Chinese in 2007 Hong Kong Certificate of Education Examination. Her examination result was lauded by major media outlets of Hong Kong.

== See also ==
- Tung Wah Group of Hospitals
- Education in Hong Kong
- List of secondary schools in Hong Kong
- Lists of schools in Hong Kong
