= Xue Xiangdong =

Chinese billionaire businessman

- Born: 1958 or 1959 (age 66–67); China
- Education: Hunan University
- Occupation: Businessman
- Known for: Founder of DHC Software
- Title: Chairman, DHC Software
- Board member of: DHC Software
- Spouse: Married

Xue Xiangdong (Chinese: 薛向东, born 1958/1959) is a Chinese billionaire businessman, chairman of DHC Software, a Chinese industrial application software company.

He graduated from Hunan University in 1978.

He left a state-owned company in 1992 to work as the China representative of a Canadian software company, and borrowed money to start his own software firm in 1993. In 2001, he co-founded what was to become DHC Software.

As of March 2022, Forbes estimated his net worth at US$1.9 billion.

He is married and lives in Beijing.
