= Tung Wah Group of Hospitals Li Ka Shing College =

Secondary school in Hong Kong

- 東華三院李嘉誠中學
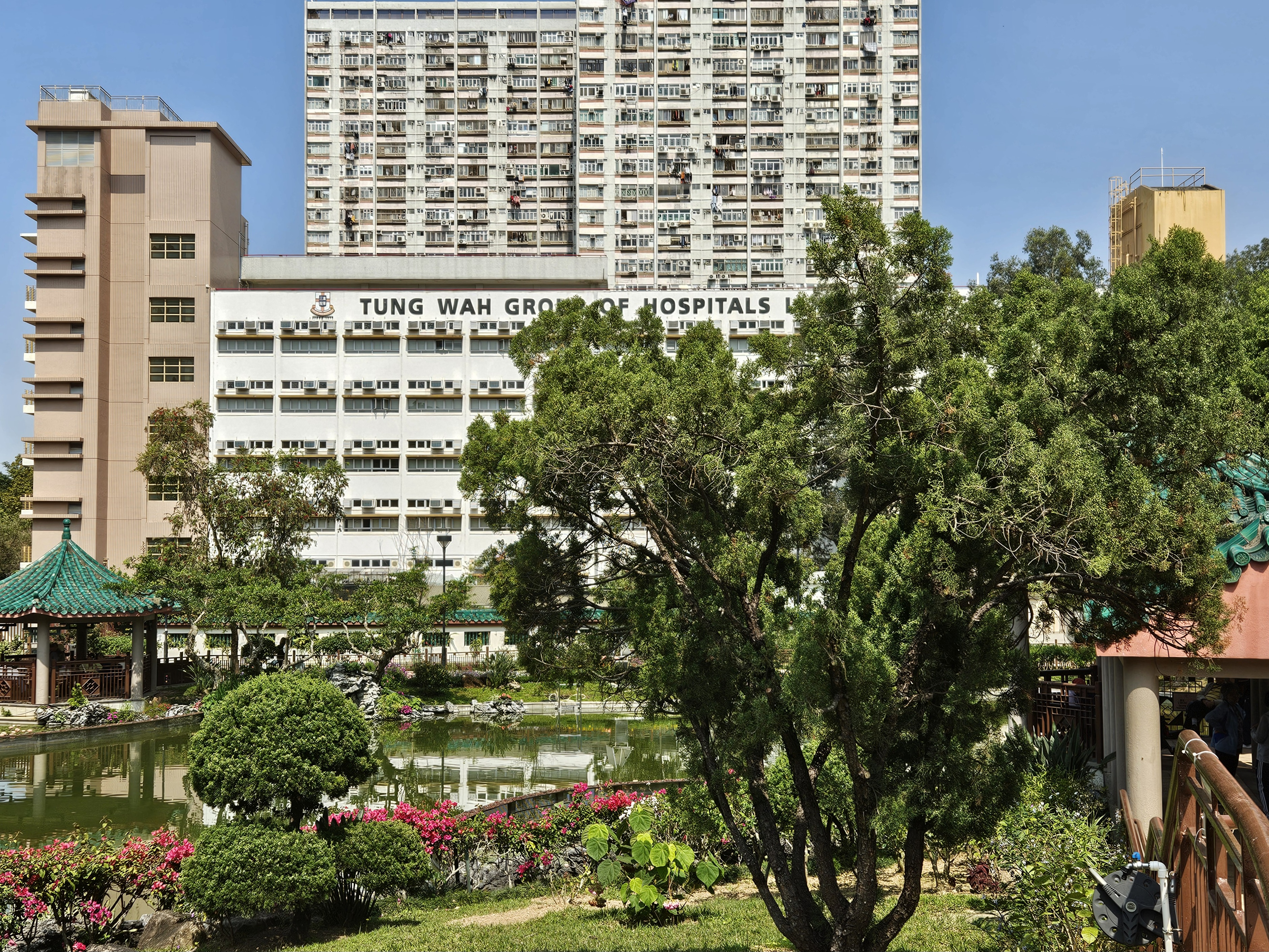
- Pictured in 2024

Location
- Cheung Wah Estate, Fanling, New Territories; Hong Kong
- 22.492625°N 114.142920°E

Information
- School type: Aided Secondary school
- Motto: Diligence, Frugality, Loyalty and Faithfulness (勤、儉、忠、信)
- Established: 1982; 44 years ago
- School district: North District
- Supervisor: Leung Ting-yu
- Principal: Au Man-so
- Vice Principals: Pang Chin-ching; Wong Pui-pui; Wong Wing-hong
- Assistant Principals: Wong Cheuk-ling
- Faculty: 71
- Years: 6
- Gender: Co-educational
- Classes: 30
- Language: English Medium Instruction
- Campus size: About 7,000 m^{2}
- Houses: Red (勤), Yellow (儉), Blue (忠), Purple (信)
- Affiliation: Tung Wah Group of Hospitals
- Website: www.twghlkss.edu.hk

Tung Wah Group of Hospitals Li Ka Shing College
- Traditional Chinese: 東華三院李嘉誠中學
- Simplified Chinese: 东华三院李嘉诚中学
Transcriptions
Standard Mandarin
- Hanyu Pinyin: Dōnghuá Sānyuàn Lǐ Jiāchéng Zhōngxué
Yue: Cantonese
- Jyutping: dung1 waa4 saam1 jyun2 lei5 gaa1 sing4 zung1 hok6

Tung Wah Group of Hospitals Li Ka Shing College (Chinese: 東華三院李嘉誠中學) is an aided secondary school in Hong Kong, founded in 1982. It is the twelfth secondary school established by Tung Wah Group of Hospitals. The school is located in Cheung Wah Estate, Fanling.

== Donor ==
Li Ka-shing, renowned Hong Kong business magnate, investor and philanthropist, made significant donations to construct the school's campus in 1982 and upgrade the school's facilities, including air-conditioning system of the school hall, in 1997. In 2006, Li made another donation to build a new annex for the school and improve its facilities and equipment. Hence, the school was named after him.

== List of principals ==
Name	Years in office
Wu Kwok-yin (胡國賢)	1982–1993
Chung Chiang-hon (叢蔣漢)	1993–2005
Leung Hok-po (梁學圃)	2005–2021
Au Man-so (歐文素)	2021-

== House ==
There are currently 4 houses.

Existing	Eliminated
勤 ● Red	仁 ● Orange
儉 ● Yellow	義 ● Brown
忠 ● Blue	禮 ● Green
信 ● Purple	智 ● Gray

The originally consisting 8 houses is merged into 4 in school year 2018–2019. The students in the eliminated houses in year 2017–2018 are now assigned to the corresponding houses shown on the table above.

== Academic ==
=== Subjects offered ===
==== Junior Form ====
The former principal, Mr CHUNG Chiang Hon, has started to offer English Literature and English Enrichment Programme and provide Media English in 2004 in order to put emphasis on English. Due to the Fine-tuning of Medium of Instruction for Secondary Schools starting from 2010, the medium of instruction in F.1 has been changed to English.

The subjects offered in F.1
Chinese as medium of instruction	Mandarin, History, Liberal Studies, Music, Physical Education, Visual Arts, Civil Education
English as medium of instruction	English Language, English Literature, Mathematics, Integrated Science, Geography, Computer Literacy, Home Economics, Design & Technology

The subjects offered in F.2 and F.3
Chinese as medium of instruction	Chinese(Putonghua as a medium of instruction), Chinese History, History, Mathematics, Integrated Science, Economics, Geography, Home Economics, Design & Technology, Music, Physical Education, Visual Arts, Civil Education, Putonghua
English as medium of instruction	English Language, English Literature, Computer Literacy

==== Old Senior Secondary ====
There were 5 classes each form in form 4 and form 5, namely, 1 Art stream class, 2 Commerce stream classes and 2 Science stream classes. Generally, students from A and E took 8 HKCEE subjects and those from B, C, D take 7. The last class of F.5 taking HKCEE ended in 2010.

4A/5A	4B/5B	4C/5C	4D/5D	4E/5E
Compulsory HKCEE subjects:Chinese, English, Mathematics
Compulsory non-HKCEE subjects:Physical Education, Civic Education, Integrated Art Education(F.4)
HKCEE subjects
Chinese History			Physics	
History			Chemistry	
Economics	Principle of Accounts		Biology	
Geography				Additional Mathematics/ Computer & Information Technology
Computer & Information Technology/ Principle of Accounts(For Art student)/ Word Processing & Business Communication/ Biology/Chinese Literature/Economics(For Commerce student)/Putonghua/Visual Art			Computer & Information Technology(Students from D and those studying A.Maths in E)/ Economics/Principle of Accounts/ Word Processing & Business Communication/ Chinese Literature/Putonghua/Visual Art	

There are 2 classes in each form in forms 6 and 7, namely, Art and Commerce class and Science class. Students can select 3AL, 2AL+2AS, 2AL+1AS as their HKALE subjects apart from Chinese Language and Culture and Use of English.

Art and Commerce Stream(6A/7A)			Science Stream(6B/7B)		
Compulsory HKALE subjects:Chinese Language and Culture(AS), Use of English(AS)
Compulsory non-HKALE subjects:Physical Education, Civlc Education, Integrated Art Education(F.6), Putonghua(F.6)
Compulsory HKALE subjects
Group	Select 4 subjects among 3 groups Only one subject is selected from each group		Group	Select 1 subject from each group.	
1	#Chinese History	Economics	A	Pure Mathematics	Biology
2	Chinese Literature	Geography	B	Applied Mathematics	Chemistry
3	#History	Principle of Accounts	C	Physics	*Mathematics & Statistics and/or *Computer Application and/or *Liberal Studies (1 to 2 subjects only)
4	*Liberal Studies	*Mathematics & Statistics	C	Physics	*Mathematics & Statistics and/or *Computer Application and/or *Liberal Studies (1 to 2 subjects only)

*Advance Supplementary Level (AS) Subject
#Both Advance Supplementary Level (ASL) and Advance Level (AL) options offered
Note: Starting from 2007, students from Art and Commerce stream can take computer Application; those from Science stream can take 1 commerce subject.

==== New Senior Secondary(NSS) curriculum ====
Starting from 2009, T.W.G.Hs Li Ka Shing College offers the new senior secondary course.

4A/5A/6A	4B/5B/6B	4C/5C/6C	4D/5D/6D	4E/5E/5F/6E
Compulsory HKDSE subjects:Chinese, English, Mathematics, Liberal Studies
Compulsory non-HKDSE subjects:Physical Education, Civic Education, Integrated Art Education(F.4-F.5)
HKDSE subjects
History	Chinese History	Business, Accounting and Financial Studies	Biology	Physics
Chinese History/ History/ Tourism and Hospitality Studies/ Geography/ Combined Science(Chemistry + Physics)				Chemistry
Economics/ Chinese Literature/ Information and Communication Technology/ Business, Accounting and Financial Studies(Not for students in 4C/5C/6C)/ Biology(Not for students in 4D/5D/6D)/ Visual Art

== Notable people ==
- Warwick Wan Wo Tat (2008–2011 District Councillor in North District Council)
- Wallis Pang (Hong Kong actress)

== Student Union ==
- 2021-2022 Unique (478 votes)
- 2022-2023 Libra (301 votes)
- 2023-2024 Sparkle (449 votes)
- 2024-2025 Asteroid
- 2025-2026 Morii
