= Donghua =

Donghua may refer to:

- Chinese animation (simplified Chinese: 动画; traditional Chinese: 動畫; pinyin: dònghuà)
- Taiwanese animation
- DHC Software, a Chinese company
- East China (东华)
- Donghua University, Shanghai
- National Dong Hwa University, Taiwan

== See also ==
- Tung Wah (disambiguation)
