= Tung Wah Museum =

Museum in Hong Kong

Coordinates: 22.3149°N 114.1719°E

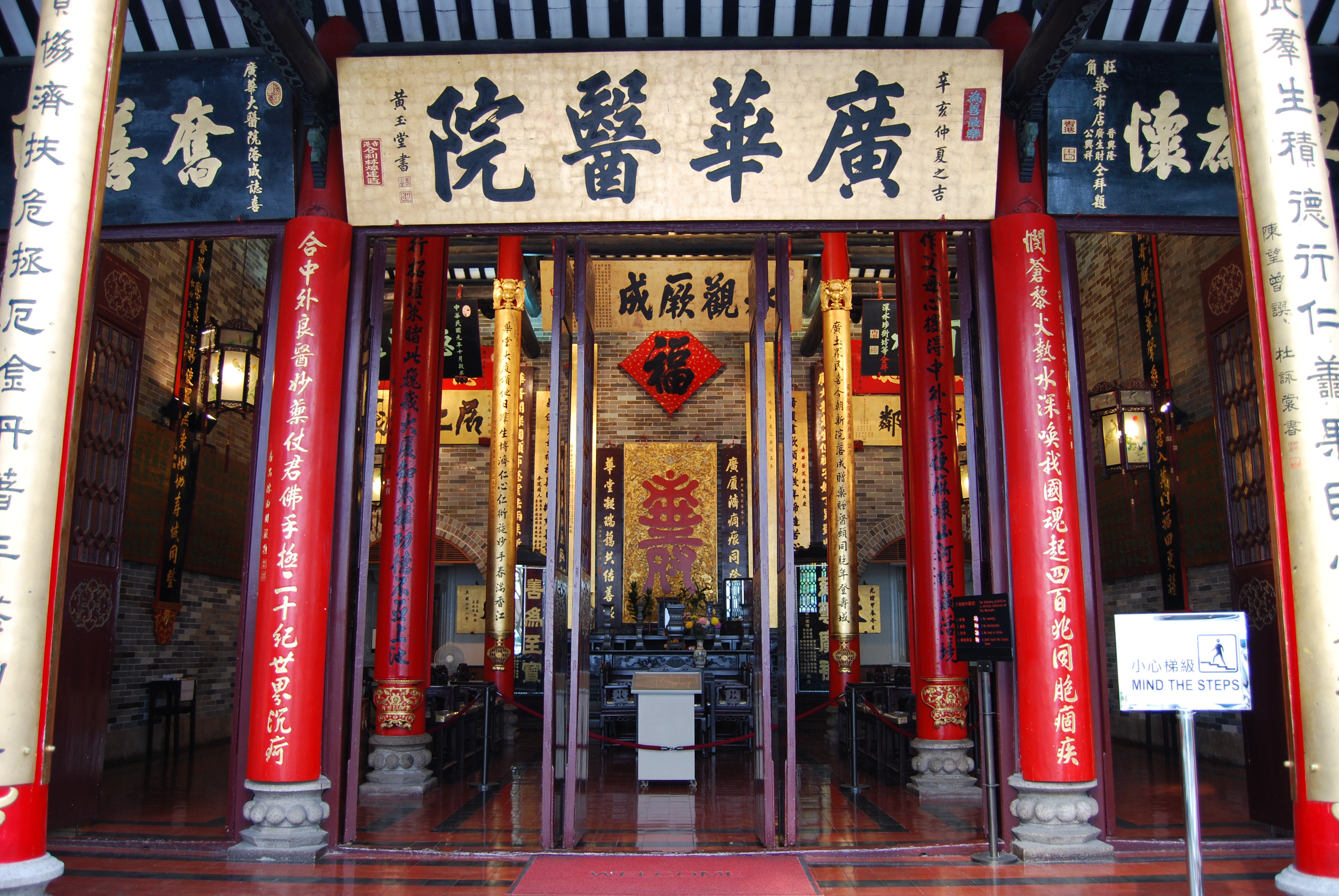
- Tung Wah Museum
- Traditional Chinese: 東華三院文物館
- Simplified Chinese: 东华三院文物馆
Transcriptions
Standard Mandarin
- Hanyu Pinyin: Dōnghuá Sānyuàn Wénwùguǎn
Yue: Cantonese
- Jyutping: dung1 waa4 saam1 jyun2 man4 mat6 gun2

Tung Wah Museum is a museum housed in the former Main Hall Building of Kwong Wah Hospital, located at 25 Waterloo Road, Kowloon, Hong Kong. Only this building was preserved when Kwong Wah Hospital was re-developed in 1958–1963. This building was built in 1911; it was classified as a Grade I historic building and in 2010, it was declared as a monument.

== Display ==
The Museum was set up in 1970, the centenary year of Tung Wah Group of Hospitals. It displays the archives and relics of the Tung Wah Group of Hospitals. The exhibits include the plaque presented by Li Hongzhang, a Qing official, with three of his colleagues in 1884. There are other plaques and gifts presented to the Hospitals by officials from Qing Dynasty and the Republic of China

== Hours ==
The Museum is open from Monday through Saturday: 10 a.m. to 6 p.m. and is closed on public holidays.

== Transportation ==
- Yau Ma Tei station Exit A2
