= Tung Wah Group of Hospitals Yau Tze Tin Memorial College =

Secondary school in Hong Kong

- 東華三院邱子田紀念中學
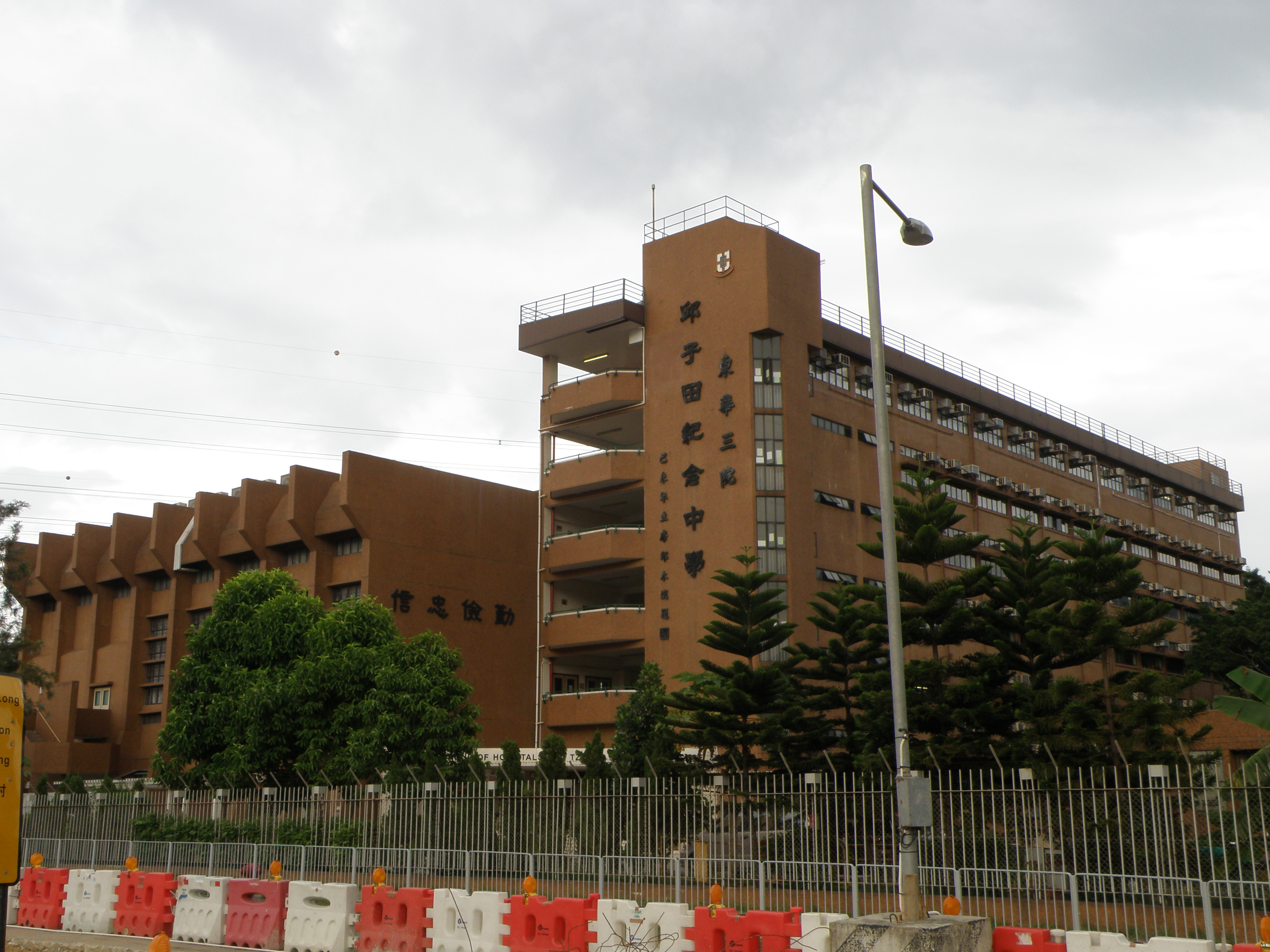
- Pictured in 2011

Location
- 1 Siu Hong Road, Siu Hong Court, Tuen Mun, New Territories; Hong Kong
- Coordinates: 22.413557°N 113.977234°E

Information
- School type: Aided Secondary school
- Motto: Diligence, Frugality, Loyalty, Trustworthiness (勤、儉、忠、信)
- Established: 1982
- Status: Active
- School district: Tuen Mun District
- Chairman: Tsoi Wing-sing
- Principal: Yip Wai Yee
- Teaching staff: 61 (as of 2016)
- Years: 6
- Gender: Co-educational
- Classes: 24 (as of 2016)
- Language: Predominantly Chinese
- Campus size: About 6800 m²
- Affiliation: Tung Wah Group of Hospitals
- Website: www.ytt.edu.hk

Tung Wah Group of Hospitals Yau Tze Tin Memorial College
- Traditional Chinese: 東華三院邱子田紀念中學
- Simplified Chinese: 东华三院邱子田纪念中学
Transcriptions
Standard Mandarin
- Hanyu Pinyin: Dōnghuá Sānyuàn Qiū Zǐtián Jìniàn Zhōngxué
Yue: Cantonese
- Jyutping: dung1 waa4 saam1 jyun2 jau1 zi2 tin4 gei2 nim6 zung1 hok6

Tung Wah Group of Hospitals Yau Tze Tin Memorial College (Chinese: 東華三院邱子田紀念中學) is an aided secondary school in Hong Kong. Fully subsidized by Government of Hong Kong, the day school is located in Siu Hong Court, Tuen Mun, New Territories. The grammar school is the tenth secondary school established by Tung Wah Group of Hospitals, the oldest and largest charitable organization of Hong Kong, in 1982.

== See also ==
- Tung Wah Group of Hospitals
- Education in Hong Kong
- List of secondary schools in Hong Kong
- List of schools in Hong Kong
