= Tung Wah Group of Hospitals Wong Fut Nam College =

- 東華三院黃笏南中學
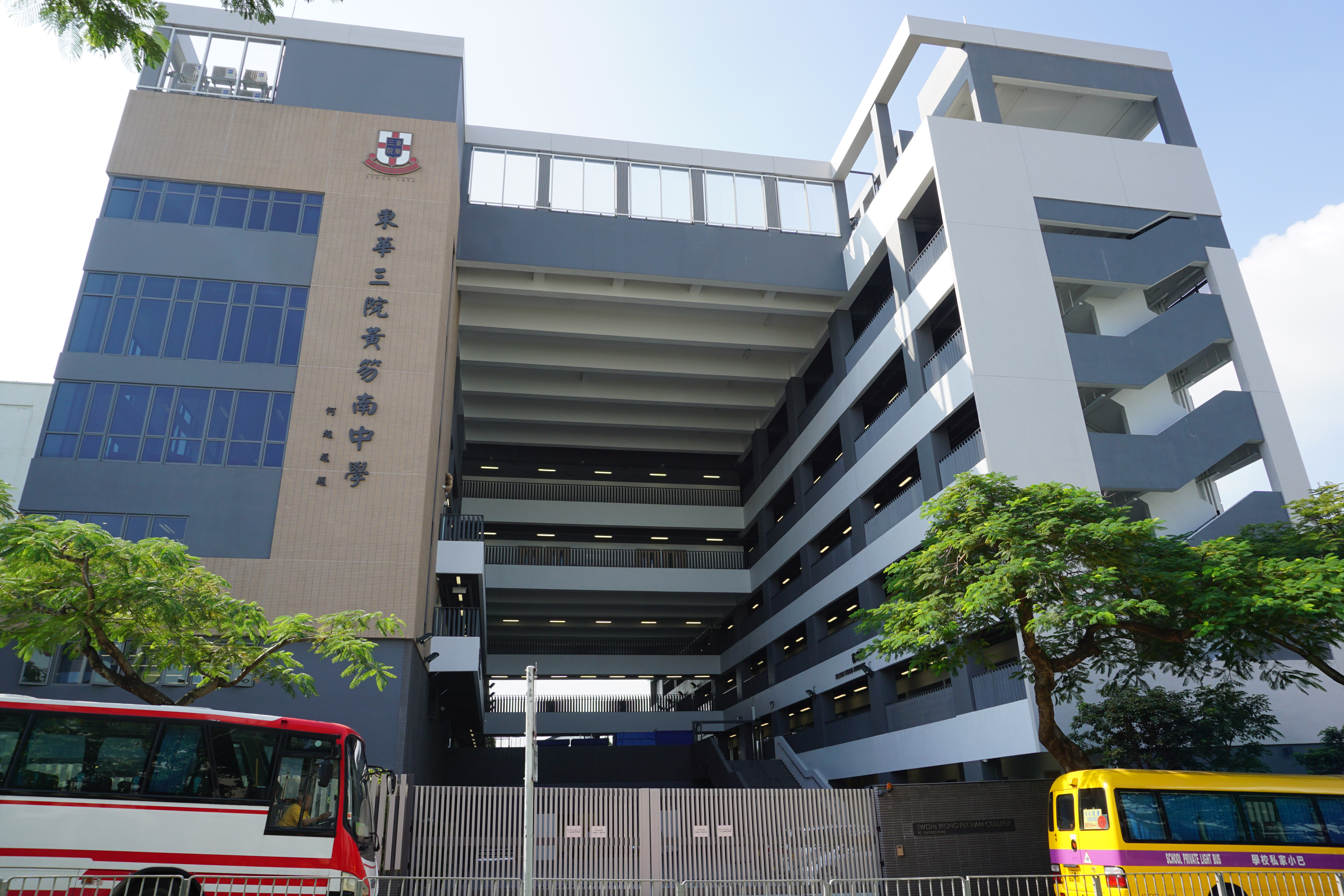
- Renovated campus pictured in 2016

Location
- 1C Oxford Road, Kowloon Tong, Kowloon; Hong Kong
- Coordinates: 22.329142°N 114.180511°E

Information
- Former name: Tung Wah Hospital Number One College
- Type: Secondary school
- Motto: Diligence, Frugality, Loyalty, Faithfulness (勤、儉、忠、信)
- Established: 8 September 1961
- Status: Active
- School district: Kowloon City District; Yau Tsim Mong District
- Chairperson: Man Wing-yee Ginny
- Principal: Szeto Suet Ping
- Teaching staff: 67 (as of 2019)
- Grades: 6
- Gender: Co-educational
- Classes: 30 (as of 2025)
- Language: Predominantly English
- Campus size: About 3800 m²
- Affiliation: Tung Wah Group of Hospitals
- Website: www.twghwfns.edu.hk

Tung Wah Group of Hospitals Wong Fut Nam College (Chinese: 東華三院黃笏南中學) is a Hong Kong secondary school (Also known as Tung Wah No.1 College and Wong Fut Nam College). Fully subsidized by the Government of Hong Kong, the day school is located in Oxford Road, Kowloon Tong, Kowloon.

== Foundation ==
Being the first secondary school founded by the Tung Wah Group of Hospitals, the oldest and largest charitable organizations in Hong Kong, the school was initially named Tung Wah Hospital Number One College upon the school's establishment on 8 September 1961. It was then bestowed the current name after Wong Fut-nam, a local entrepreneur and philanthropist, donated HK$500,000 in the autumn of 1971.

== School Achievement ==
Music

- 2024 Hong Kong Youth Interflows (Symphonic Orchestra) — Silver Award

== Extra-curricular activities ==
Tung Wah Group of Hospitals, sponsoring body of the school, arranged in 2017 a two-week joint school overseas language immersion program, including a trip to Vancouver, for students. The school is also famous for its athletic team, a frequent winner of various sports competition in the districts.

== Long hair ==
In 2022, student Nathan Lam Chak-chun filed a complaint with the Equal Opportunities Commission, alleging that the school broke the Sex Discrimination Ordinance and pressured him to cut his long hair.

== See also ==
- Tung Wah Group of Hospitals
- Education in Hong Kong
- List of secondary schools in Hong Kong
- Lists of schools in Hong Kong
