= Tung Wah Group of Hospitals Chen Zao Men College =

Coordinates: 22°21′51.83″N 114°07′45.05″E

T.W.G.Hs Chen Zao Men College Chinese: 東華三院陳兆民中學
- CZM
- 1-5 Kwai Hop Street, Kwai Chung, N.T. Hong Kong

Information
- Type: secondary, co-educational
- Motto: Diligence 勤, Frugality 儉, Loyalty 忠 and Trustworthiness 信
- Established: 1972
- School district: Kwai Tsing
- Principal: Mr. Lui Chun Kei (呂振基)
- Enrollment: approx. 1000
- Affiliation: Tung Wah Group of Hospitals
- Forms Alumni: Form 1 to Form 7 Alumni Website
- Website: http://www.twghczm.edu.hk/

Tung Wah Group of Hospitals Chen Zao Men College (CZM, Traditional Chinese: 東華三院陳兆民中學) is a secondary school located at Kwai Chung, New Territories, Hong Kong. Initiated in 1969 by the board of directors of Tung Wah Group of Hospitals, Tung Wah Group of Hospitals Chen Zao Men College was named after Mr Chen Zao Men (陳兆民先生).

== History ==
1969
The school was initiated by the board of directors of the Tung Wah Group of Hospitals as the fourth secondary school in the New Territories.

20 September 1970

- The school was named as TWGHs Chen Zao Men College after Mr. Chen Zao Men donated the construction fee for the schoolbuilding.

== See also ==
- Education in Hong Kong
- List of schools in Hong Kong
