= Tung Wah Group of Hospitals Chang Ming Thien College =

- 東華三院張明添中學
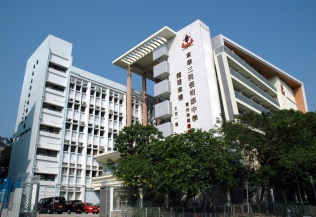
- No. 300, Nam Cheong Street; Kowloon; Hong Kong

Information
- Other name: T.W.G.Hs Chang Ming Thien College
- Type: Subsidized secondary school
- Established: 1971
- Principal: Chow Ying Tai
- Affiliation: Tung Wah Group of Hospitals
- Website: twghcmts.edu.hk

Tung Wah Group of Hospitals Chang Ming Thien College is a secondary school located at No. 300, Nam Cheong Street, Kowloon, Hong Kong.

== Overview ==
The school was founded in 1971, the third offered by full-time government-funded grammar school of the Tung Wah Group of Hospitals. It uses Chinese as the medium of instruction. The campus covers an area of 7,400 square meters, a total of 32 classrooms, 16 special rooms, and a student activity center, the Language Self-Access Learning Centre, a large multi-purpose venue, study room, and library. All of the classrooms, special rooms are equipped with air-conditioning, a projector and computer equipment. The school consists of 60 teachers with a diploma in education, bachelor's or master's degree.

== Society and extra-curricular activities ==
Students Union, Sports Associations, four clubs and 28 Student Clubs will be selected each year to learn the composition of Executive Committee, to provide students with a wide range of extracurricular activities. Events include a Sports Day, Drama festival, Music festival, English and Chinese Week, and variety shows.

== School curriculum ==
The school consists of 31 classes, with nearly 1,200 boys and girls. There is a diverse curriculum, including arts, science, business, technical, and practical subjects. There are four groups of 30 subjects, giving a variety of choices. Over the past few years, students have successfully participated in the HKCEE, HKALE, and other public examinations.

== Gallery ==
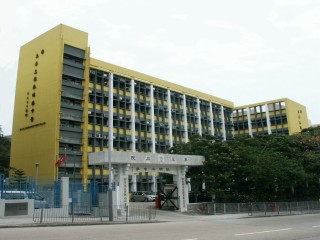
Chan Ming Thien College old school

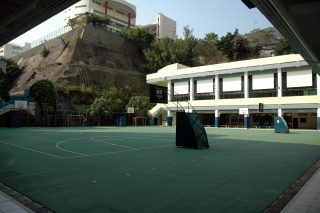
The school playground

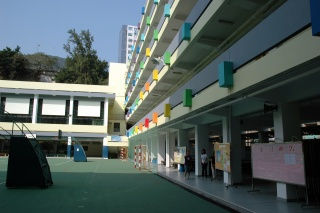
A school building

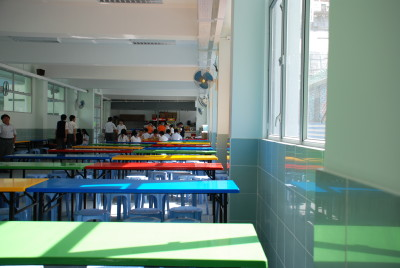
The new school canteen

== See also ==
- Tung Wah Group of Hospitals
