= DHC Software =

Chinese software company

DHC Software Co., Ltd.
- Simplified Chinese: 东华软件股份公司
- Traditional Chinese: 東華軟件股份公司
- Literal meaning: East China Software, Company [Limited] by Shares
Transcriptions
Standard Mandarin
- Hanyu Pinyin: Dōng huá ruǎn jiàn gǔ fèn gōng sī

DHC Software Co., Ltd. (DHCC) is a publicly traded company based in Beijing. (SZSE: 002065) The company was a constituents of SZSE 100 Index, SZSE 300 Index and SZSE Component Index (top 100, 300 and 500 companies of Shenzhen Stock Exchange).

The billionaire Xue Xiangdong is the co-founder and chairman of the company.

== See also ==
- Donghua (disambiguation)
