= Tung Wah Group of Hospitals =

Hong Kong charitable organization

- Traditional Chinese: 東華三院
- Simplified Chinese: 东华三院
Transcriptions
Standard Mandarin
- Hanyu Pinyin: Dōnghuá Sānyuàn
Yue: Cantonese
- Jyutping: dung1 waa4 saam1 jyun2

The Tung Wah Group of Hospitals (Chinese: 東華三院), with a history dating back to 1870, is the oldest and largest charitable organisation in Hong Kong. It provides extensive education and community services through 194 service centres spread across Hong Kong.

Although Tung Wah Group of Hospitals is purely a charitable organisation today, it was originally an organisation that brought together the most influential Chinese magnates of Hong Kong in early colonial period. Tung Wah Group of Hospitals is also responsible for the management of Man Mo Temple, once an important cultural centre of colonial Hong Kong.

Tung Wah Group of Hospitals' Gallery, can be found in Hong Kong Museum of Medical Sciences, exhibits antiques of the charitable organisation. Tung Wah Group of Hospitals Museum, also managed by Tung Wah Group of Hospitals, is located inside Kwong Wah Hospital.

== Name origin ==
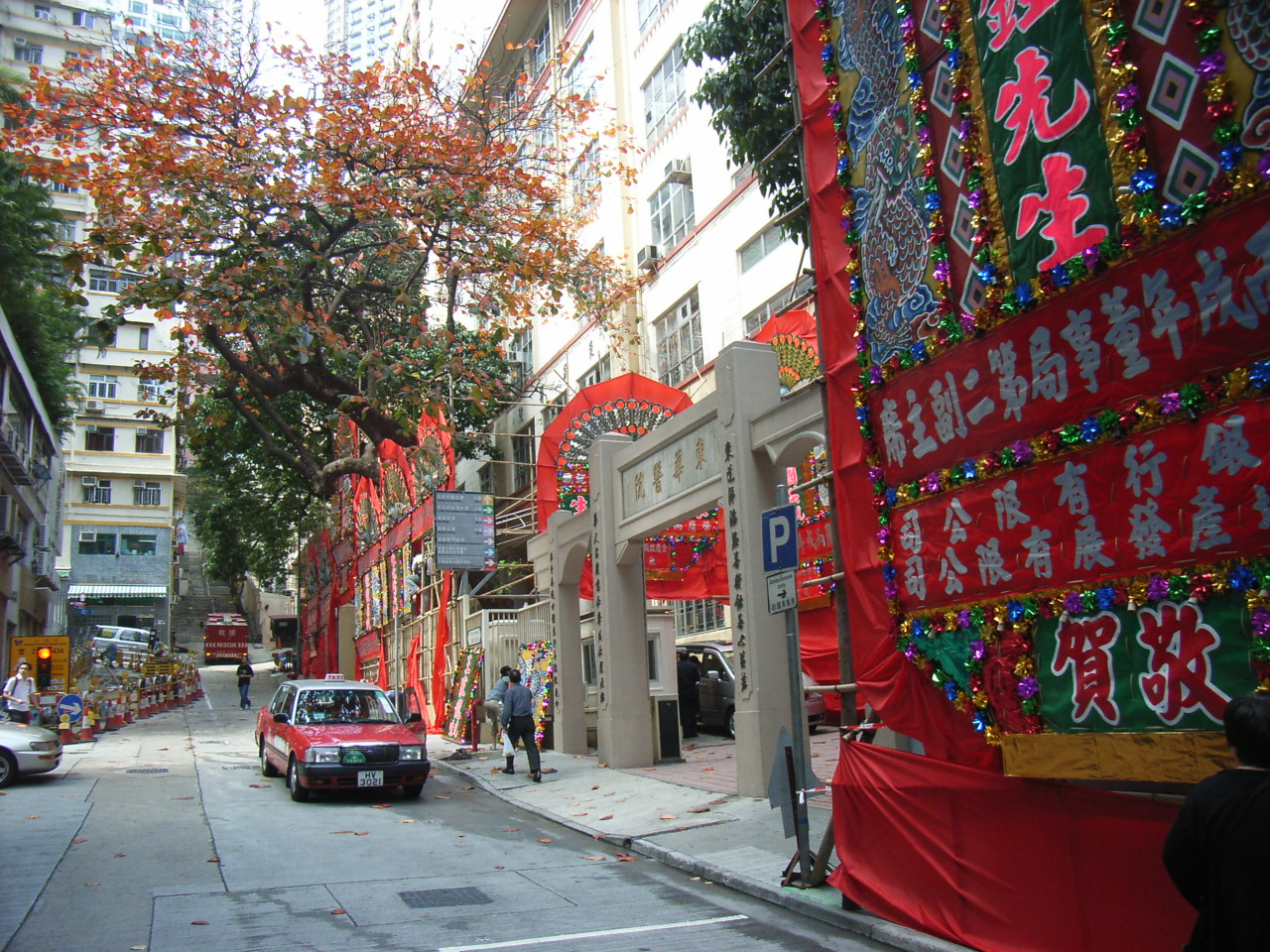
Tung Wah Hospital

The Chinese name of Tung Wah Group of Hospitals (東華三院), literally translated, means three hospitals of Eastern China. The three hospitals are Tung Wah Hospital (1890), Kwong Wah Hospital (1911) and Tung Wah Eastern Hospital (1929), all were founded by local Chinese. They formed a group in 1931, the Tung Wah Group of Hospitals.

== Board of directors ==
The Board of Directors of Tung Wah Group of Hospitals is responsible for ensuring the charitable organization is properly maintained. All board appointments require consent of Government of Hong Kong.

The incumbent chairman of Tung Wah Group of Hospitals, Lee Yuk-lun, took office on 6 April 2017, succeeding his predecessor, Katherine Ma.

== Hospital services ==
Five hospitals are under the umbrella of Tung Wah Group of Hospitals, including Tung Wah Hospital, Kwong Wah Hospital, Tung Wah Eastern Hospital, Tung Wah Group of Hospitals Wong Tai Sin Hospital and Tung Wah Group of Hospitals Fung Yiu King Hospital, providing a total of 2,652 hospital beds as of 2017. It is Tung Wah's policy to provide at least 600 beds free of charge, of which 200 may be funded by the government.

TWGH also operates nursing home services for the elderly:

- Jockey Club Sunshine Complex for the Elderly - at the old Nam Long Hospital site

== School of Nursing ==
Providing competent nurse education has been a mission of Tung Wah Group of Hospitals since 1964, when nursing schools of Tung Wah Hospital, Kwong Wah Hospital and Tung Wah Eastern Hospital were merged. With the expansion of Kwong Wah Hospital, where the merged nursing school was settled, more students were admitted to its nursing school. Three classes, with a total of over 210 students, were commenced every year. Rebecca Chan Chung (鍾陳可慰), a United States Army nurse in China during World War II and author of Piloted to Serve, had supervised the nursing school from 1964 to 1975.

== Education Division ==
The group operates 52 schools in Hong Kong, including one degree granting tertiary institution, 18 secondary schools, 17 primary schools, 15 kindergartens and two schools for the mentally handicapped. Except for the degree granting tertiary institution and kindergartens, the other schools are all directly funded by the government.

Self-financing degree granting tertiary institution:

- Tung Wah College

Secondary schools:

- Tung Wah Group of Hospitals C.Y. Ma Memorial College, Au Tau, Yuen Long - since 1994
- Tung Wah Group of Hospitals Chang Ming Thien College, Sham Shui Po - since 1971
- Tung Wah Group of Hospitals Chen Zao Men College, Kwai Shing, Kwai Chung - since 1972
- Tung Wah Group of Hospitals Kap Yan Directors' College, Choi Yuen Estate, Sheung Shui - since 1982
- Tung Wah Group of Hospitals Kwok Yat Wai College, Tin Shui Wai, Yuen Long - since 1995
- Tung Wah Group of Hospitals Lee Ching Dea Memorial College, North Point - since 1970
- Tung Wah Group of Hospitals Li Ka Shing College, Cheung Wah Estate, Fanling - since 1982
- Tung Wah Group of Hospitals Lo Kon Ting Memorial College, Long Ping Estate, Yuen Long - since 1987
- Tung Wah Group of Hospitals Lui Yun Choy Memorial College, Tseung Kwan O - since 1995
- Tung Wah Group of Hospitals Mr. & Mrs. Kwong Sik Kwan College, Tuen Mun - since 1998
- Tung Wah Group of Hospitals Mrs. Fung Wong Fung Ting College, Lek Yuen Estate, Sha Tin - since 1978
- Tung Wah Group of Hospitals Mrs. Wu York Yu Memorial College, Kwai Chung - since 1977
- Tung Wah Group of Hospitals S.C. Gaw Memorial College, Tsing Yi - since 1984
- Tung Wah Group of Hospitals Sun Hoi Directors' College, Wu King Estate, Tuen Mun - since 1981
- Tung Wah Group of Hospitals Wong Fung Ling College, Ma On Shan Road, Sha Tin - since 1977
- Tung Wah Group of Hospitals Wong Fut Nam College, Oxford Road, Kowloon - since 1961
- Tung Wah Group of Hospitals Yau Tze Tin Memorial College, Siu Hong Court, Tuen Mun - since 1982
- Tung Wah Group of Hospitals Yow Kam Yuen College, City One, Sha Tin - since 1985

Primary schools include:

- Tung Wah Group of Hospitals Chow Yin Sum Primary School
- Tung Wah Group of Hospitals Wong See Sum Primary School

== Community Services Division ==
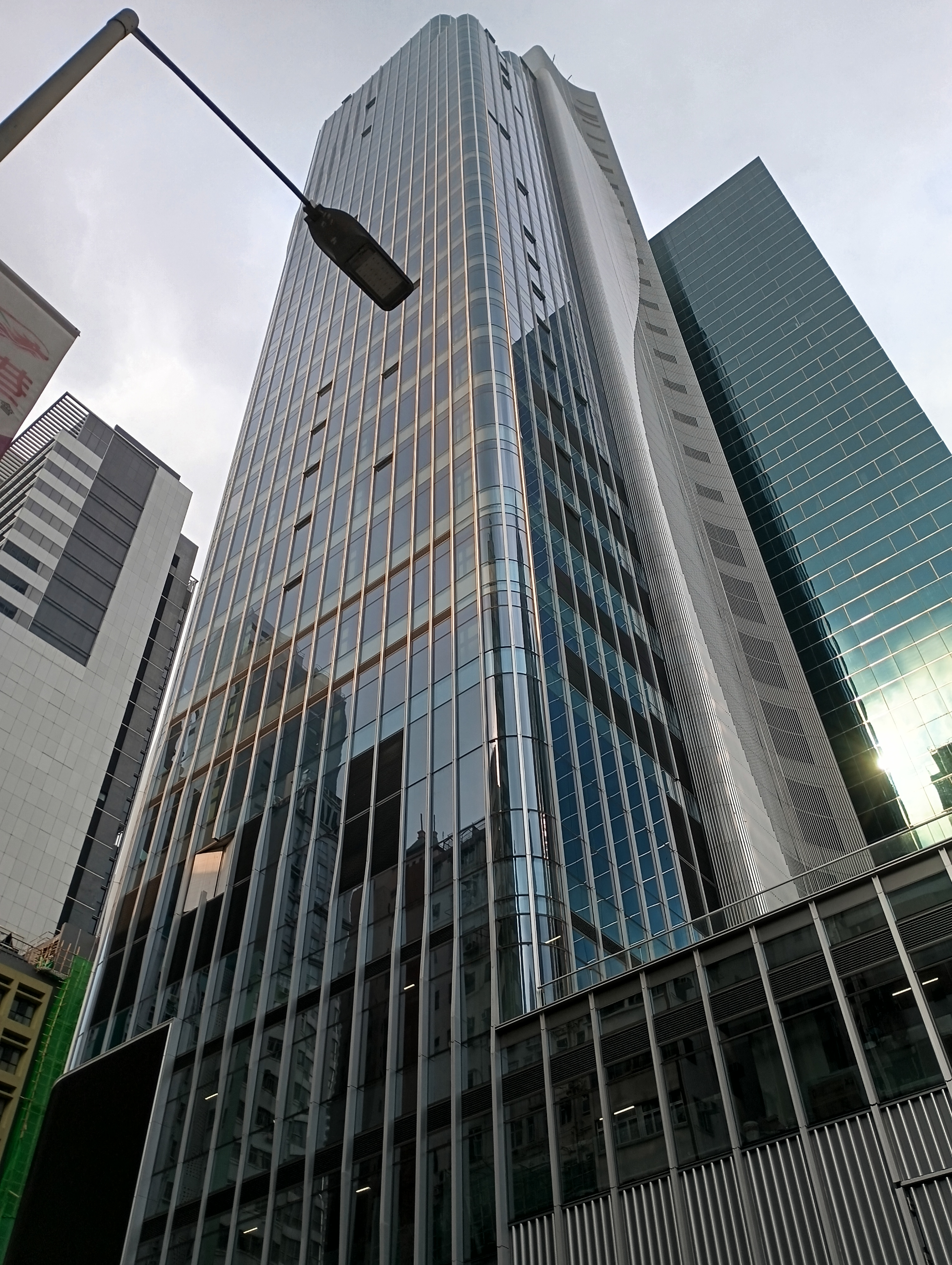
200 Lockhart Road

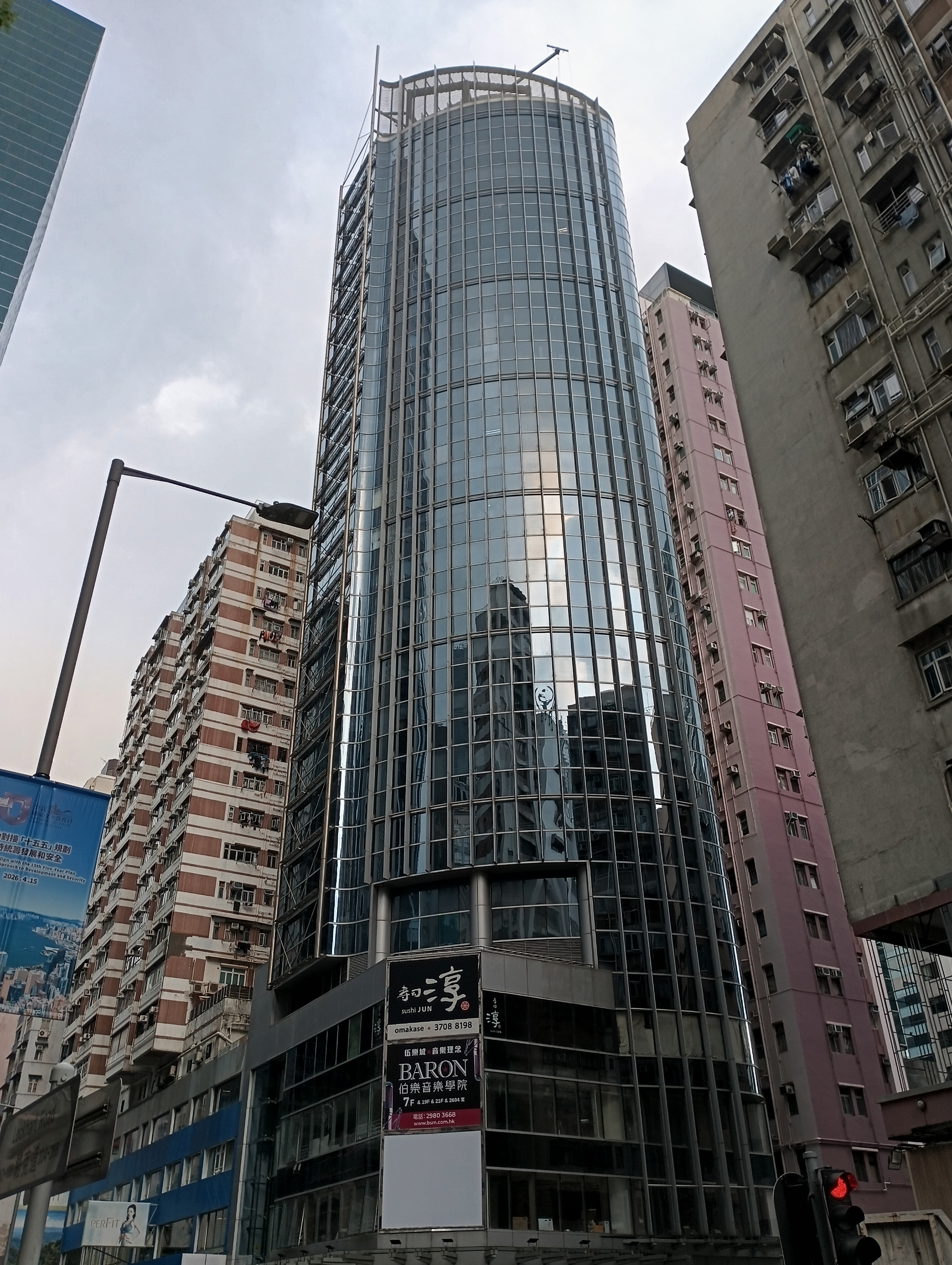
Tung Chiu Commercial Centre

As at March 2006, Tung Wah operated 134 community service centres:

- Elderly Services Centres: 41 centres
- Youth and Family Services Centres: 38 centres
- Rehabilitation Services: 38 centres
- Traditional Services: 17 centres, including:
  - Funeral parlours:
    - TWGHs Diamond Hill Funeral Parlour, 181 Po Kong Village Road, Kowloon - since 1977
    - TWGHs International Funeral Parlour, 8 Cheong Hang Road, Hung Hom - since 1980
    - Tung Wah Coffin Home, Cemeteries and Colombarium, 9 Sandy Bay Road - since 1899
  - Temples and fortune-telling stalls:
    - TWGHs Man Mo Temple, 124-126 Hollywood Road - since 1847
    - TWGHs Litt Shing Kung, 128 Hollywood Road - since 1847
    - Kwun Yum Temple, 400 Shatin Pass Road, Tsz Wan Shan, Kowloon - since 1853
    - TWGHs Kwong Fook Tsz, 40 Tai Ping Shan Street - since 1856
    - Hung Shing Temple, Wan Chai, 129 Queen's Road East - since 1860 (The management of the Temple has been delegated to the Tung Wah Group of Hospitals by the Chinese Temples Committee since pre-war times)
    - Tin Hau Temple, Temple Street/Public Square Street, Yau Ma Tei - since 1865
    - Fook Tak Tsz, Temple Street/Public Square Street, Yau Ma Tei - since 1865
    - Shea Tan, Temple Street/Public Square Street, Yau Ma Tei - since 1865
    - Shing Wong Temple, Temple Street/Public Square Street, Yau Ma Tei - since 1972
    - The School, Temple Street/Public Square Street, Yau Ma Tei - since 1972
    - Hung Shing Temple, 58 Fuk Tsun Street, Kowloon - since 1881 (The temple was moved and rebuilt at the present site in 1930, and has since been managed by the Tung Wah Group of Hospitals.)
    - Shui Yuet Kung, 90 Shantung Street, Kowloon - since 1884
    - Wong Tai Sin fortune-telling and oblation arcade, Lung Cheung Road, in front of Wong Tai Sin Temple, Kowloon - since 1956 (161 soothsayers' stalls and 40 temple goods stalls)
  - Commemoration hall:
    - Virtue Court, 130 Hollywood Road - since 1993

== See also ==
- Pok Oi Hospital
- Po Leung Kuk
