= Cheung Wah Estate =

Public housing estate in Fanling, Hong Kong

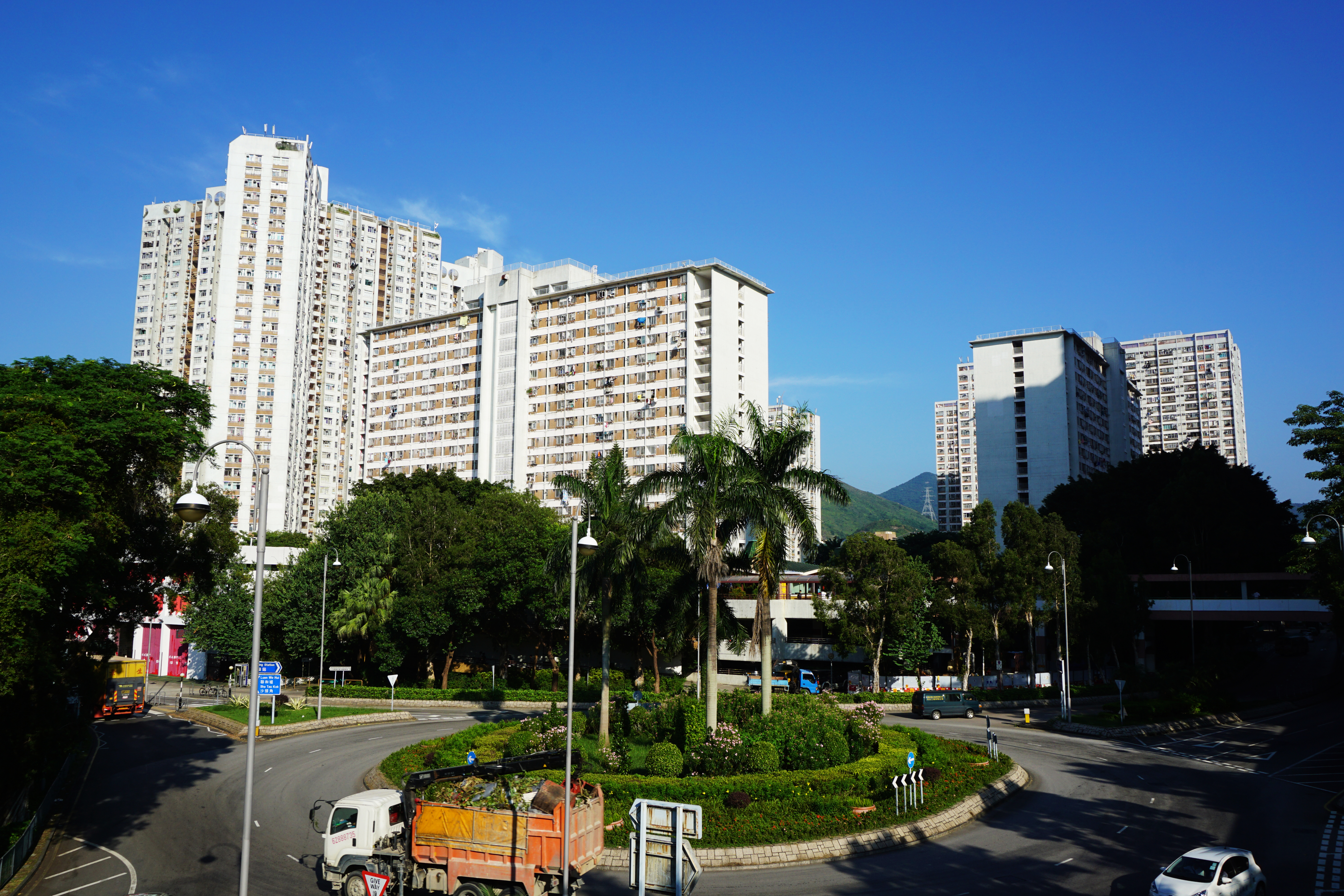
- Cheung Wah Estate
- Interactive map of Cheung Wah Estate

General information
- Location: 38 San Wan Road, Fanling; New Territories, Hong Kong
- Coordinates: 22.493°N 114.14146°E
- Status: Completed
- Category: Public rental housing
- Population: 13,109 (2016)
- No. of blocks: 10
- No. of units: 2,471

Construction
- Constructed: 1984; 42 years ago
- Authority: Hong Kong Housing Authority

Cheung Wah Estate (Chinese: 祥華邨) is a mixed TPS and public housing estate in Fanling, New Territories, Hong Kong. It is the first public housing estate in Fanling Town, consisting of ten residential blocks completed from 1984 to 1986. Some of the flats were sold to tenants through Tenants Purchase Scheme Phase 6A in 2004.

== Houses ==
Name	Chinese name	Building type	Completed
Cheung Lai House	祥禮樓	Old Slab	1984
Cheung Chung House	祥頌樓	Old Slab	1984
Cheung Shun House	祥順樓	Double H	1984
Cheung King House	祥景樓	Double H	1984
Cheung Fung House	祥豐樓	Double H	1984
Cheung Yue House	祥裕樓	Double H	1984
Cheung Wo House	祥和樓	Double H	1984
Cheung Lok House	祥樂樓	Double H	1984
Cheung Tak House	祥德樓	Trident 2	1985
Cheung Chi House	祥智樓	Trident 2	1986

== Demographics ==
According to the 2016 by-census, Cheung Wah Estate had a population of 13,109. The median age was 49.2 and the majority of residents (99 per cent) were of Chinese ethnicity. The average household size was 2.7 people. The median monthly household income of all households (i.e. including both economically active and inactive households) was HK$22,490.

== Politics ==
Cheung Wah Estate is located in Cheung Wah constituency of the North District Council. It was formerly represented by Chan Yuk-ming, who was elected in the 2019 elections until July 2021.

== See also ==
- Public housing estates in Fanling
