= Tung Wah Eastern Hospital =

- Hospital Authority and Tung Wah Group of Hospitals

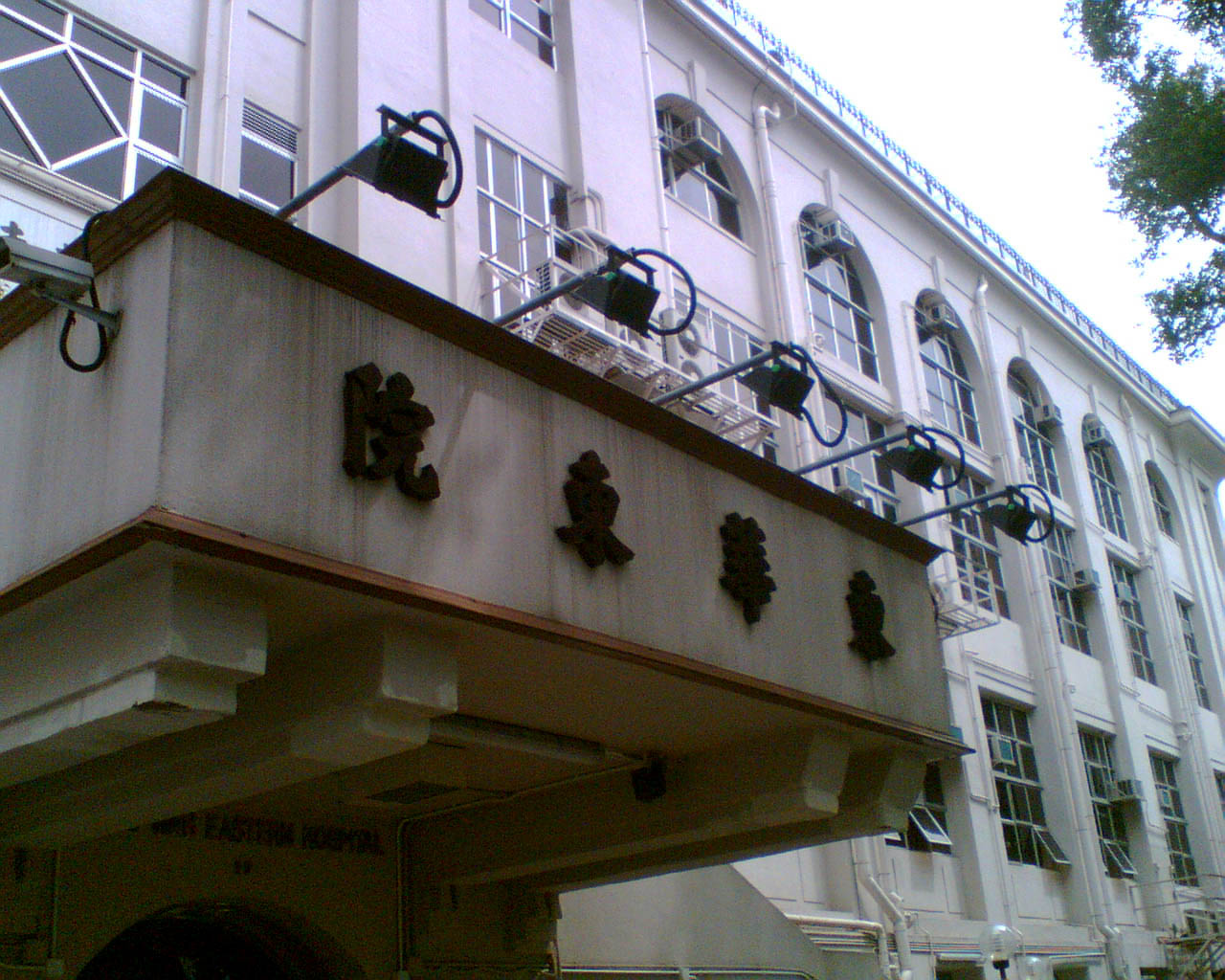
- Tung Wah Eastern Hospital entrance

- Location within Hong Kong

Geography
- Location: 19 Eastern Hospital Road, Causeway Bay, Hong Kong Island, Hong Kong
- Coordinates: 22°16′29″N 114°11′25″E

Organisation
- Type: Specialist, Teaching
- Network: Hong Kong East Cluster

Services
- Emergency department: No Accident & Emergency at Ruttonjee Hospital
- Beds: 278

History
- Founded: 27 November 1929; 96 years ago

Links
- Website: www.ha.org.hk/tweh/
- Lists: Hospitals in Hong Kong

Hong Kong Graded Building – Grade II
- Designated: 18 December 2009; 16 years ago
- Reference no.: 433

Tung Wah Eastern Hospital
- Traditional Chinese: 東華東院
- Simplified Chinese: 东华东院
Transcriptions
Standard Mandarin
- Hanyu Pinyin: Dōnghuá Dōngyuàn
Yue: Cantonese
- Yale Romanization: Dūng wàh dūng yún
- Jyutping: Dung1 waa4 dung1 jyun2

Tung Wah Eastern Hospital (Chinese: 東華東院; TWEH) is a charitable rehabilitation hospital located at Causeway Bay and operated by the Tung Wah Group of Hospitals. The hospital was formerly called Indian General Hospital (IGH).

Opened on 27 November 1929, the hospital is located in So Kon Po, Causeway Bay and became a public hospital in 1991. It is primarily for the rehabilitation of patients who are almost ready to be discharged from the hospital system. Thus, patients are typically not severely ill or injured. This is why there are no emergency or accident facilities.

The rooftop garden, located on what would be the fourth floor, gives both staff and patients the opportunity to enjoy fresh air, sunshine and a scenic view of the local area.
