= Kai Tak Hospital =

Hospital under construction in Kowloon, Hong Kong

- Hospital Authority
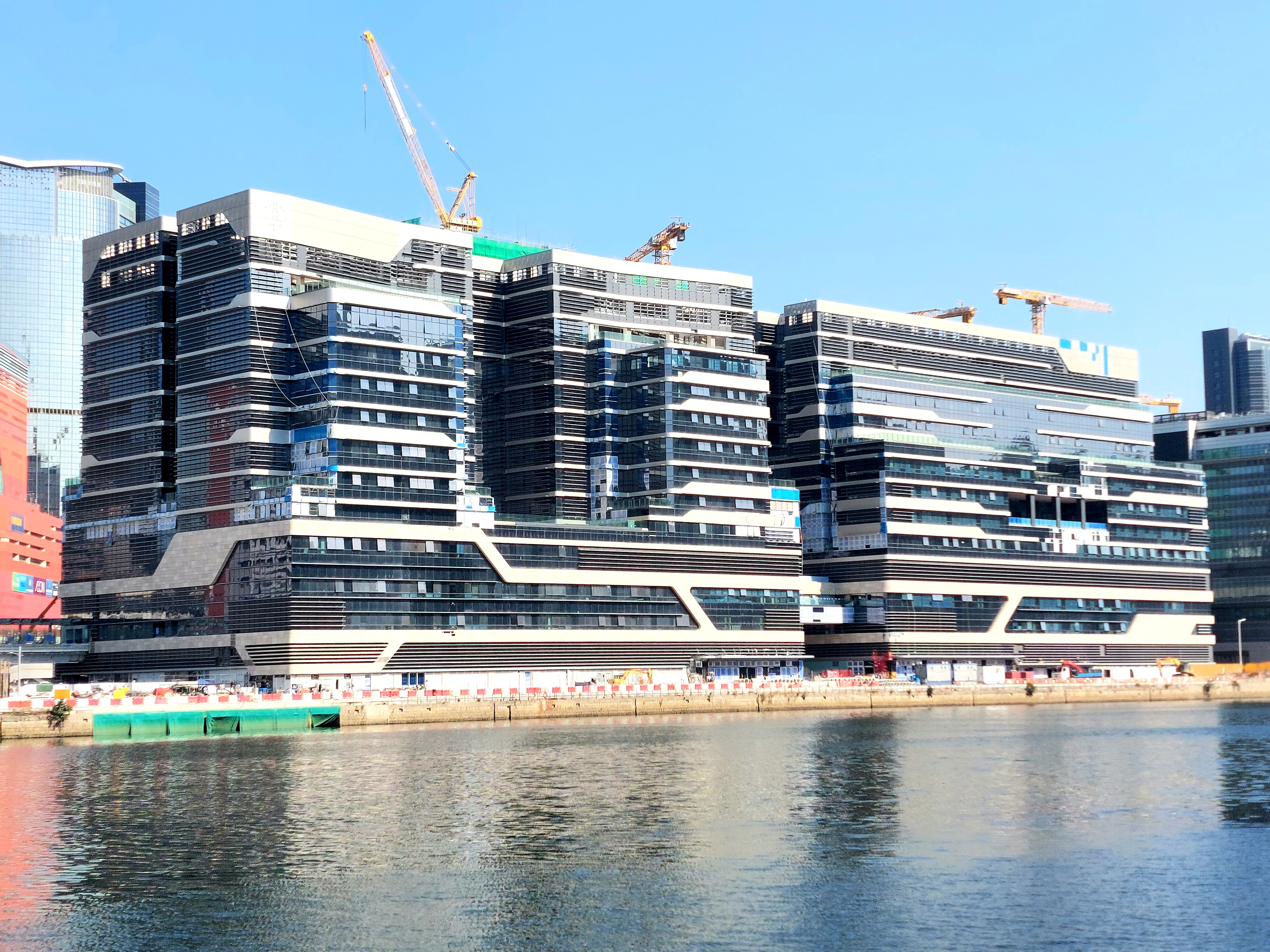
- Kai Tak Hospital under construction

- Location within Hong Kong

Geography
- Location: 2-3 Shing Cheong Road, Kai Tak, Kowloon, Hong Kong
- Coordinates: 22°18′56″N 114°12′32″E

Organisation
- Care system: Public
- Type: District General
- Network: Kowloon Central Cluster

Services
- Emergency department: Yes (after Phase 2), accident and emergency and trauma centre
- Beds: 2,400

Helipads
- Helipad: Yes

History
- Opened: October 2026 (expected)

Links
- Website: www32.ha.org.hk/capitalworksprojects/en/Project/10years/New-Acute-Hospital-At-Kai-Tak/Introduction.html
- Lists: Hospitals in Hong Kong

Kai Tak Hospital
- Traditional Chinese: 啟德醫院
- Simplified Chinese: 启德医院
Transcriptions
Standard Mandarin
- Hanyu Pinyin: Qǐdé Yīyuàn
Yue: Cantonese
- Yale Romanization: Káidāk Yīyún
- Jyutping: kai2 dak1 ji1 jyun2

New Acute Hospital
- Traditional Chinese: 新急症醫院
- Simplified Chinese: 新急症医院
Transcriptions
Standard Mandarin
- Hanyu Pinyin: Xīn Jízhèng Yīyuàn
Yue: Cantonese
- Yale Romanization: Sān Gāpjing Yīyún
- Jyutping: san1 gap1 zing3 ji1 jyun2

Kai Tak Hospital (Chinese: 啟德醫院; Jyutping: kai2 dak1 ji1 jyun2; Cantonese Yale: Káidāk Yīyún; KTH), also known as the New Acute Hospital (Chinese: 新急症醫院; Jyutping: san1 gap1 zing3 ji1 jyun2; Cantonese Yale: Sān Gāpjing Yīyún; NAH), is a hospital currently under construction in Kai Tak, Kowloon City District, Hong Kong. It is expected to open in 2 phases from October 2026, with accident and emergency services opening in 2028. When completed, it will be Hong Kong's largest public hospital, with an estimated capacity of 2,400 beds and a total gross floor area of 500,000 square metres.

As with other public hospitals in Hong Kong, Kai Tak Hospital will be run under the governance of the Hospital Authority, which has designated Kai Tak Hospital to become the flagship hospital of the Kowloon Central Cluster.

The hospital is opposite the Hong Kong Children's Hospital on the south apron of the former Kai Tak Airport in Kowloon Bay. The area is being redeveloped as part of the Kai Tak Development.

Kai Tak Hospital is intended to take over some operations from Queen Elizabeth Hospital, located in King's Park. The transfer of services will begin with specialist outpatient and oncology wards in October 2026.

It will serve residents in the Yau Tsim Mong, Kowloon City, Wong Tai Sin, and Kwun Tong districts.

== Services ==
According to the Hospital Authority, the new hospital will provide a variety of services:

- Inpatient care
- Radiology/diagnostics (including Magnetic Resonance Imaging (MRI), Computed Tomography (CT), and Ultrasonography
- Cardiac catheterisation
- Emergency services/observation care
- Labour and delivery
- Peri-operative
- Anaesthesiology
- Neuroscience
- Oncology
- Ambulatory care
- Day surgery/day procedure/endoscopy
- Specialist outpatient and general outpatient clinics
- Community health centre
- Oral maxillofacial surgery & dental care
- Clinical laboratory
- Rehabilitation and other allied health and social work
- Pharmacy
- Community health education
- Education and training
- Mortuary
- Helipad

The Kai Tak Hospital will be the first hospital in Hong Kong to have a cyclotron. This will allow for production of radioactive tracers, which will be used for diagnostics and oncology.

The Hong Kong Government on 9 April 2026 also indicated its intention to establish a custodial ward through amendment of the Prisons Ordinance to establish the legal framework for providing care to incarcerated persons.

== Transportation ==
Like the neighbouring Hong Kong Children's Hospital, the location of the Kai Tak Hospital is accessible to multiple public transit lines in Hong Kong. 8 bus and 6 minibus routes connect to KTH. Transfer vehicles will also connect Kai Tak Hospital to the MTR system, allowing passengers of the Kwun Tong, Tuen Ma, and Tseung Kwan O lines of the MTR to be able to travel to and from the hospital.
