= D. J. M. Mackenzie =

Hong Kong academic and politician (1905-1994)

Dr. D. J. M. Mackenzie CMG, OBE
- 麥敬時醫生
- Born: David James Masterton Mackenzie; 23 July 1905; Maungaturoto, New Zealand
- Died: 10 March 1994 (aged 88); Cape Town, South Africa
- Education: University of Edinburgh
- Occupation: medical official

David James Masterton Mackenzie CMG OBE (Traditional Chinese: 麥敬時醫生, 23 July 1905 – 10 March 1994) was a British colonial medical official. From January 1958 to September 1963, he was Director of Medical and Health Services of Hong Kong, being the last non-Chinese person to hold that post, and an official member of the Legislative Council.

Born in New Zealand, Mackenzie spent his childhood in the United Kingdom and graduated from the medical school of the University of Edinburgh in 1929. He moved to South Africa in 1932 and joined the Colonial Medical Service in 1934. He was Director of Medical Services of Bechuanaland from 1946 to 1949, of Nyasaland from 1949 to 1955, and of Northern Nigeria from 1955 to 1957. Having served in the medical departments of a number of British colonies and protectorates in Africa for some 23 years, he had become an expert of tropical diseases and infectious diseases in that region.

As Director of Medical and Health Services of Hong Kong, preventing and controlling infectious diseases had become his prime objective. When the territory was twice hit by cholera outbreaks between August and October 1961 and 1962, he adopted a number of effective emergency measures to combat the disease, such as to set up a temporary cholera hospital and a quarantine station-cum-isolation camp, and more importantly, set up a large number of vaccination points in the territory to urge the public to receive free vaccinations. Besides, to satisfy the ever-growing demand, he rapidly expanded the public health system by constructing a number of large-scale hospitals and public health facilities including the North Wing of Kwong Wah Hospital and Queen Elizabeth Hospital.

In retirement, he served in the Communicable Disease Center in Georgia, the United States, and the medical school of the University of Cape Town, South Africa. He resided in Cape Town in later years and died there.

== Biography ==
=== Early years ===
Mackenzie was born on 23 July 1905 in Maungaturoto, New Zealand. His parents were John Henderson Mackenzie (2 July 1871 – 4 March 1961) and Agnes Masterton, both of whom were Scottish. John, born in Edinburgh, was a minister of the congregational church who was sent to New Zealand for missionary service between 1905 and 1914.

The eldest child in the family, Mackenzie had one younger sister and brother: Margaret Henderson Mackenzie (9 April 1911 – 5 December 1995) and John Chalmers Mackenzie (8 June 1917 – 14 April 1992). Margaret, who adopted the surname Warwick on marriage, had worked in the National Institute of Medical Research of India.

Mackenzie was educated at Rutherford College in Newcastle, England. He then studied medicine at the University of Edinburgh, where he graduated Bachelor of Medicine and Bachelor of Surgery in 1929. In later years, he gained a Diploma of Public Health from the university in 1948, was elected a member and fellow of the Royal College of Physicians of Edinburgh in 1956 and 1959 respectively, and was elected an honorary fellow of the American College of Chest Physicians in 1958. Between 1930 and 1931, he worked briefly in the Royal Infirmary of Edinburgh.

=== Colonial career ===
In 1932, Mackenzie began practising in South Africa. He soon joined the Colonial Medical Service in July 1934 and became a medical officer of the Bechuanaland Protectorate (now Botswana), to the north of South Africa. He served in that position for a decade and acted as the principal medical officer in several occasions. His long service in the field of public health was recognised in 1944 when he was appointed a Member of the Order of the British Empire. In January 1944, he was appointed deputy director of Medical Services of Bechuanaland. He helped in the fight against the bubonic plague epidemic in the territory during the outbreak from 1944 to 1945. He was further promoted as Director of Medical Services in 1946 and was appointed an Officer of the Order of the British Empire in 1947.

Mackenzie was posted to the Nyasaland Protectorate (now Malawi) in 1949 to become Director of Medical Services as well as an official member of the Legislative Council of the protectorate. After six years of service, he was transferred to Nigeria in 1955, succeeding Dr P. S. Bell as Director of Medical Services, Northern Nigeria. He was appointed a Companion of the Order of St Michael and St George when he was posted out in 1957. Having served in the medical departments of a number of British colonies and protectorates in Africa for some 23 years, he became an expert of tropical diseases and infectious diseases in that region.

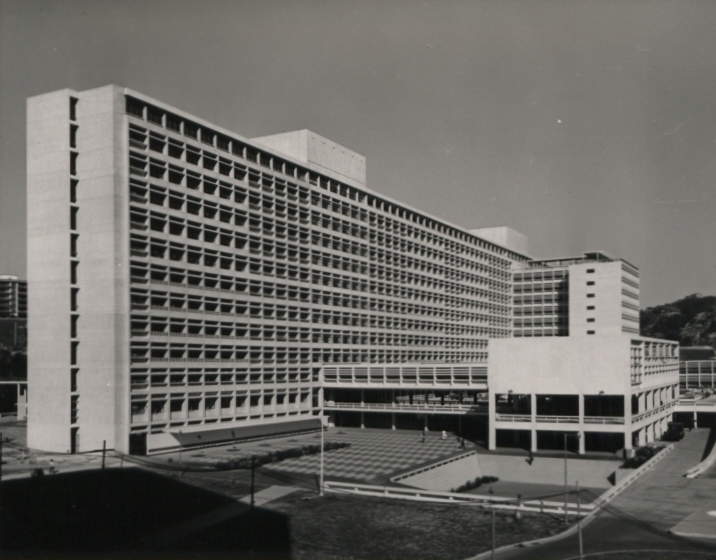
Queen Elizabeth Hospital, Hong Kong

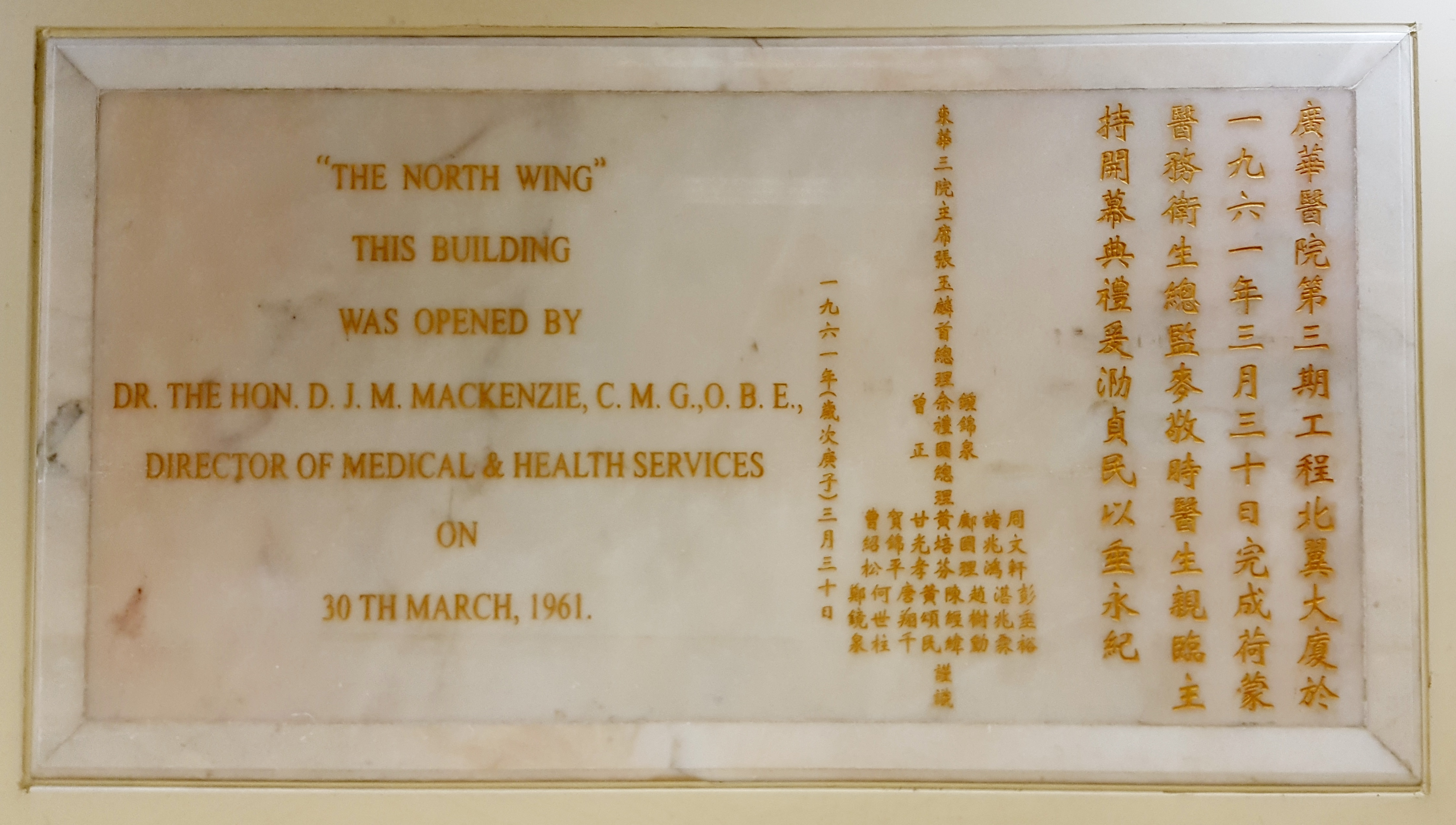
The plaque commemorating the opening of the North Wing of Kwong Wah Hospital was unveiled by Director of Medical and Health Services, Dr D. J. M. Mackenzie, on 30 March 1961.

In 1957, the Colonial Office announced that Mackenzie would be sent to Hong Kong to succeed Dr K. C. Yeo as Director of Medical and Health Services. He took the office in January 1958. In addition, he was appointed the Unit Controller of the Auxiliary Medical Services, an official member of the Legislative Council, as well as the president of a number of non-governmental organisations, such as the Hong Kong Tuberculosis, Chest and Heart Diseases Association and the Mental Health Association of Hong Kong. On 21 March 1958, he was appointed an official Justice of the Peace.

At that time, infectious diseases such as tuberculosis, malaria, diphtheria and cholera were common in Hong Kong as the territory suffered from occasional droughts and there was a continuous, large influx of refugees arriving from mainland China. In the slums on the outskirts of the city, where many refugees lived, there was no sanitised tap water and the overall public hygiene condition was poor, making things even worse.

Against this background, preventing and controlling infectious diseases became his prime objective. Like his predecessors, he continued to strengthen port quarantine measures, educate the general public in the prevention of infectious diseases through staging public campaigns, conduct field researches, distribute medicine to people at risk, and encourage the general public to receive free vaccinations. In particular, he strongly encouraged children to receive free BCG-vaccination. By 1961, as many as 80% of pregnant women who gave birth in hospital agreed to let their new-born babies receive BCG-vaccination within 48 hours. The measure helped significantly bring down the infection rate and mortality rate of tuberculosis among children under five.

Apart from that, despite his effort, Hong Kong, like the southern mainland China, Taiwan, Indonesia and the Philippines, continued to remain under the threat of cholera. In 1961 and 1962, Hong Kong was twice badly hit by cholera epidemics, during which the city was declared an infected area by the government. The 1961 outbreak, which lasted from 16 August to 12 October, was the first cholera outbreak recorded since 1946. It was more serious than the outbreak in the following year, as 129 people were diagnosed with cholera and 15 of them died. The local economy was also badly affected.

In the face of the cholera outbreak of 1961, Mackenzie adopted a number of emergency measures, such as restricting immigration, setting up a temporary cholera hospital at Lai Chi Kok Hospital and a quarantine station-cum-isolation camp at Chatham Road Camp, stepping up hygiene education for the public, and more importantly, setting up a large number of vaccination points in the territory to urge the public to receive free vaccinations. In a short period of time, the number of people receiving free vaccinations in the territory had grown to 2.5 million.

Besides, to echo the call of the Medical and Health Department in stepping up public hygiene, the Urban Services Department conducted an increased number of inspections to restaurants, streets and alleys to maintain a high quality of public hygiene. At one point during the outbreak, when there were rumours of people becoming insane after the injection, Mackenzie took swift actions to publicly denounce the rumour-makers as wicked and reiterated that pregnant women and people with high blood pressure were fit for the injection.

In comparison with the 1961 outbreak, the 1962 outbreak, which lasted from 24 August to 8 October, was not as serious and less disruptive. A total of nine cases were diagnosed and only one death was recorded, fewer than in the neighbouring region. Apart from local-level effort, Mackenzie attended a number of international cholera conferences, where he proposed his intention to control cholera as well as other infectious diseases at regional level. These conferences included the Southeast Asia Treaty Organisation Cholera Research Laboratory Advisory Council meetings at Dacca, Pakistan (now in Bangladesh), in March and November 1962, and the World Health Organization (WHO) Regional Committee meetings at Manila, the Philippines, in September 1962 and May 1963.

Another major objective of Mackenzie during his time as Director of Medical and Health Services was to rapidly expand public-health services to satisfy ever-increasing public demand. Public hospital projects completed during his tenure included the large and modern Queen Elizabeth Hospital at King's Park, which was opened on 10 September 1963, and the North Wing of Kwong Wah Hospital at Yau Ma Tei on 30 March 1961. Other public-health-development projects completed during his tenure included the Sandy Bay Infirmary (now Tung Wah Group of Hospitals Fung Yiu King Hospital) in December 1962 and the Kowloon Rehabilitation Centre in August 1963, etc. Furthermore, the foundation stones of Tsuen Wan Adventist Hospital, Li Po Chun Health Centre and the Lions Clubs Government Maternal and Child Health Centre in Kowloon City were laid by him in June, July and September 1963 respectively.

In April 1963, it was announced that Mackenzie would retire and leave Hong Kong in September and would be succeeded by the deputy director, Dr Teng Pin-hui. In September, he attended the Legislative Council meeting for the final time, in which he was thanked by the Governor, Sir Robert Black, for his performance in the past five and a half years. In October 1963, soon after his departure, Hong Kong was again hit by a minor cholera outbreak Mackenzie was the last non-Chinese person to hold the post of Director of Medical and Health Services of Hong Kong. All his successors were ethnic Chinese.

=== Later years ===
Mackenzie lived in retirement in the United Kingdom. Between 1965 and 1969, he was a visiting scientist under the Malaria Eradication Program of the Communicable Disease Center at Atlanta, Georgia, the United States. In 1965, he represented the British government to attend international cholera conferences in Pakistan and Hawaii. As a part of the Malaria Eradication Global Strategy of the WHO, he also served as the WHO Consultant of the Thailand Study Team from July to August 1968.

In later years, Mackenzie, who had served in Africa for a long time, chose to migrate to Cape Town, South Africa. From 1970 to 1984, he was an honorary research associate of the Department of Medical Microbiology of the medical school of the University of Cape Town. In November 1976, at the age of 71, he paid a visit to his old friends in Hong Kong and was invited to preside over the graduation ceremony of government physical therapists. He died in Cape Town on 19 March 1994, aged 88. Throughout his lifelong medical and academic career, he published research articles on cholera and other infectious diseases in academic journals, government reports and other publications.

== Personal life ==
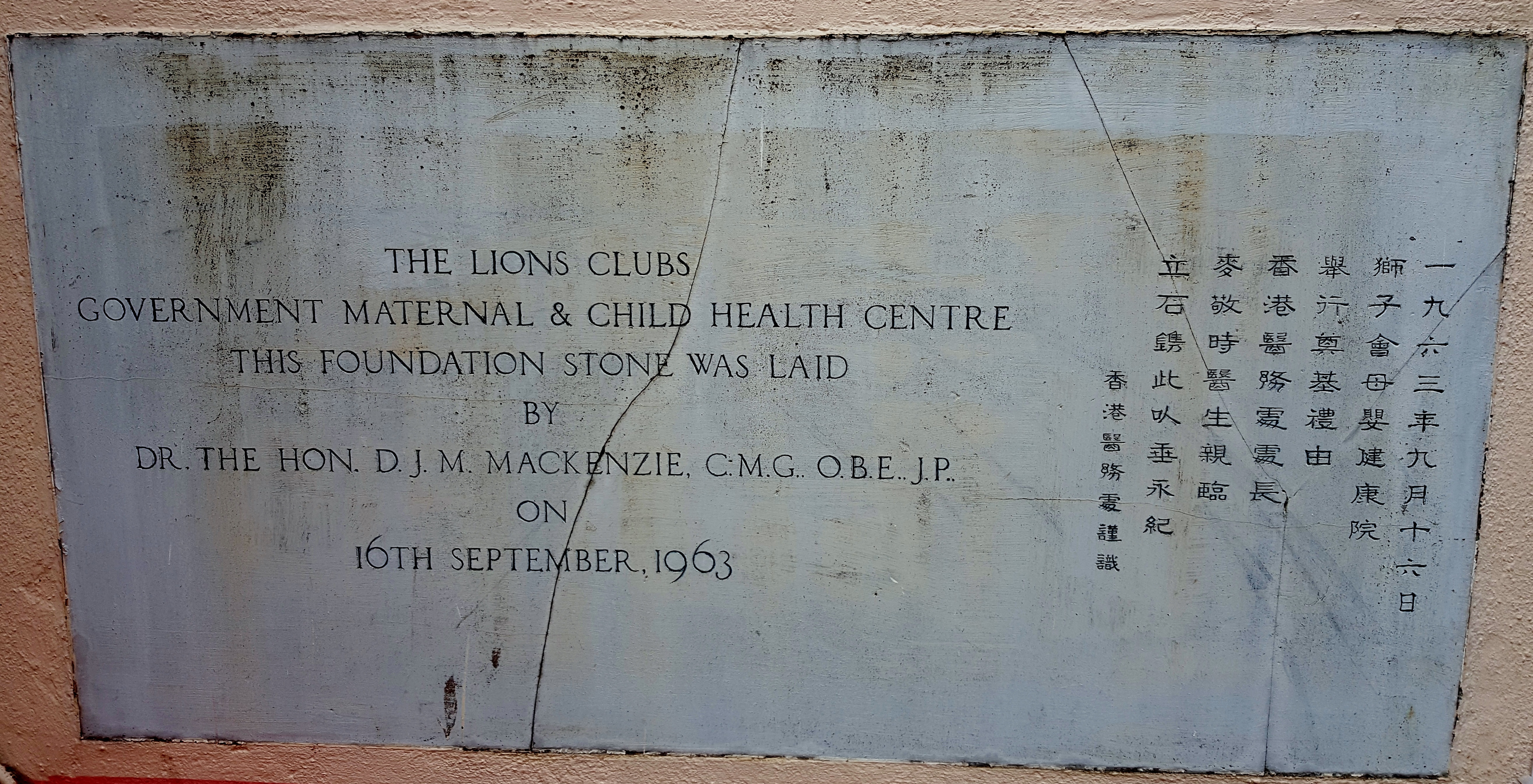
Dr D. J. M. Mackenzie, Director of Medical & Health Services, laid the foundation stone of the Lions Clubs Government Maternal and Child Health Centre in Kowloon City on 16 September 1963.

Mackenzie married Patricia Eleanor Margaret Bailey in South Africa on 21 July 1934. Patricia was the daughter of Alexander Bailey from the British crown colony of Basutoland (now Lesotho). The couple had two daughters. Mrs Mackenzie died in Cape Town on 14 January 1993.

Mackenzie enjoyed golf and fishing; he was a member of the Royal Hong Kong Golf Club, the Zomba Gymkhana in Malawi, and the West India Club in London.

== Selected publications ==
- Report on the outbreak of cholera in Hong Kong. Hong Kong: Medical and Health Department, 1961.
- Notes on problems facing malaria eradication programmes in tropical zones, with special reference to Thailand. Geneva : World Health Organization, 1969.
- "Cholera – its nature, management and prevention ", S. A. Medical Journal Vol 45. South Africa: South African Medical Association, 2 January 1971, pp. 3–7.

== Honours ==
- Honours and professional qualifications
  - Member of the Order of the British Empire (M.B.E.) (New Year Honours List 1944)
  - Officer of the Order of the British Empire (O.B.E.) (King's Birthday Honours List 1947)
  - Member of the Royal College of Physicians of Edinburgh (MRCPE) (1956)
  - Companion of the Order of St Michael and St George (C.M.G.) (Queen's Birthday Honours List 1957)
  - Official Justice of the Peace (J.P.) (21 March 1958)
  - Honorary Fellow of the American College of Chest Physicians (FCCP (Hon.)) (1958)
  - Fellow of the Royal College of Physicians of Edinburgh (FRCPE) (1959)
- Competition named after him
  - Mackenzie Shield: a first-aid competition of the Auxiliary Medical Service

== See also ==
- Selwyn Selwyn-Clarke
- Queen Elizabeth Hospital, Hong Kong
- Infectious disease

== Footnotes ==
Government offices
Preceded by Dr K. C. Yeo	Director of Medical and Health Services, Hong Kong; 1958–1963	Succeeded by Dr Teng Pin-hui
