= Guan Bee Ong =

Hong Kong Professor of surgery

Tan Sri Guan Bee Ong (王源美) OBE, PSM, FRCSEng, FRCSEd
- Born: 29 September 1921; Kuching, Raj of Sarawak
- Died: 10 January 2004 (aged 82); Hong Kong
- Education: University of Hong Kong
- Occupation: Professor of Surgery
- Spouses: Christina Chow; Paula Ong

Guan Bee Ong
- Chinese: 王源美
Transcriptions
Standard Mandarin
- Hanyu Pinyin: Wáng Yuánměi
Yue: Cantonese
- Jyutping: Wong^{4} Jyun^{4} Mei^{5}
Southern Min
- Hokkien POJ: Ông Goân Bí

Guan Bee Ong OBE, PSM, DSc (Chinese: 王源美; Pe̍h-ōe-jī: Ông Goân Bí, 29 September 1921 — 10 January 2004) was a Hong Kong surgeon who was a professor of surgery at the University of Hong Kong. Born in Raj of Sarawak, he acquired a reputation as a skilled and innovative surgeon in British Hong Kong, who encouraged original research among surgical trainees. Originally a general surgeon whose practice included cardiac and neurosurgery, under his leadership surgical specialities and subspecialties were developed in Hong Kong.

== Early life and education ==
Ong was an ethnic Chinese born in Kuching, Raj of Sarawak. He went to boarding school in Singapore, where his natural manual dexterity and his determination to achieve perfection first became manifest. Appointed as school barber but with no practical experience in the art, he trained himself to the high standards that were to become his hallmark by paying his fellow scholars for the privilege of cutting their hair. Having decided on a career in medicine, his application to Singapore Medical College in April 1940 was turned down for 'logistical reasons'. He entered the University of Hong Kong to study medicine, but in 1941 when the Japanese invaded Hong Kong, the University was determined to continue its activities in mainland China. As a result, after a hazardous trek on foot lasting some three months, Ong and some fellow students were able to resume studies in Chongqing. Ong subsequently graduated with an MD from the Shanghai Medical School. After the war he graduated with a MBBS from the University of Hong Kong in 1947.

== Surgical career ==
Having decided on a career in surgery, for the next 10 years Ong developed his surgical skills in several centres around the world. He trained in Edinburgh and London, and was awarded the Fellowship of both the Royal College of Surgeons of Edinburgh and of England. He had further training in the United States as a result of a Harkness Commonwealth University fellowship, which enabled him to work at the Massachusetts General Hospital and Harvard University in Boston, and Bellevue Hospital in New York City.

When he returned to Hong Kong, Ong worked for the government medical services as a consultant surgeon, first at Kwong Wah Hospital before becoming surgeon-in-charge of Kowloon Hospital. In 1964, he became Professor of Surgery at the University of Hong Kong and head of the Department of Surgery at Queen Mary Hospital, the first person of Chinese descent to hold this position; in this capacity, he had charge of around 800 beds in four hospitals.

Ong established a reputation as a gifted technical surgeon and a surgical pioneer and innovator. Initially, he was a general surgeon, carrying out procedures across the surgical specialities of neurosurgery and cardiac surgery. He was one of the pioneers of the trans-sphenoidal approach to the pituitary gland; the transoral approach to the upper cervical spine , and the transhiatal dissection of the oesophagus. He also pioneered the posterior approach to the common bile duct.

Ong developed an academic framework in Hong Kong surgery, emphasising the need for basic research in surgery by establishing an animal laboratory and advising trainees to pursue research. Many of his protegees made significant contributions to different aspects of surgery under his direction. Specific areas in which Hong Kong made significant contributions under his guidance included replacement of the bladder by part of the stomach (gastrocystoplasty) after total cystectomy and the replacement of the oesophagus by the small bowel after oesophagectomy (jejunal interposition). He built up a network of hospitals in Hong Kong by appointing his former trainees to staff them. For instance, Professor Frank Cheng was the first professor to be appointed to Kwong Wah Hospital in Kowloon. The Grantham Hospital became the cardiothoracic unit of the University of Hong Kong under Ong's overall academic direction. Tung Wah Tung Hospital became the surgical convalescent arm of Queen Mary Hospital.

Under Ong's leadership, surgical specialities developed in Hong Kong, usually headed by one of his former trainees.

== Recognition and honours ==
Ong was made an Officer of the Order of the British Empire (OBE) in 1966 and became a member of the James IV Association of Surgeons the following year. He was the first recipient of the John Bruce Gold Medal from the Royal College of Surgeons of Edinburgh (RCSEd). From 1974 to 1979 he was a Governor of the American College of Surgeons. In 1979 he was awarded the Malaysian honour of Panglima Setia Mahkota (PSM) and in the same year was awarded the honorary degree of DSc by the University of Hong Kong.

Ong was President of the International Society of Surgery from 1983 to 1985. He was awarded the Gold Medal by the College of Surgeons of Malaysia and the Abraham Colles Medal by the Royal College of Surgeons in Ireland. In addition, he received the Penin Aziz Medal of the Royal College of Surgeons of Edinburgh and the Medal of the Royal Australasian College of Surgeons. He was JM Graham Visiting Professor at the University of Edinburgh and Hunterian Professor at the Royal College of Surgeons of England.

== Personal life ==
In 1950, Ong married Christina Chow, and they had five daughters and a son. He married secondly Paula Ong, and they had one son and one daughter. He died of liver cancer in 2004.

== Legacy ==
The G.B. Ong Visiting Fellowship was established in 1984 to allow members of the Department of Surgery or medical graduates of The University of Hong Kong working in the field of surgery to undertake study or overseas training. The G B Ong room in the RCSEd was named for him.
