= Our Lady of Maryknoll Hospital =

- Hospital Authority
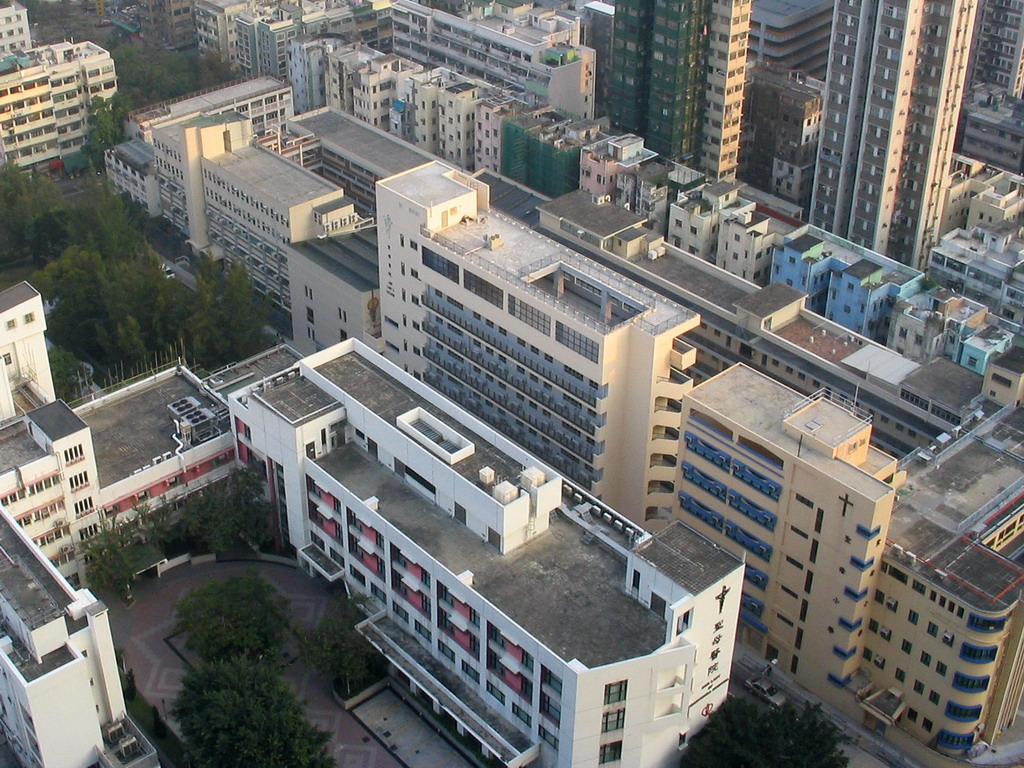

- Location within Hong Kong

Geography
- Location: 118 Shatin Pass Road, Wong Tai Sin, Hong Kong
- Coordinates: 22.34526°N 114.19659°E

Organisation
- Care system: public
- Type: Specialist
- Religious affiliation: Roman Catholic
- Patron: Maryknoll Sisters of St. Dominic
- Network: Kowloon West Cluster

Services
- Emergency department: No Accident & Emergency at United Christian Hospital, Queen Elizabeth Hospital
- Beds: 236

Helipads
- Helipad: No

History
- Founded: 11 December 1961; 64 years ago

Links
- Website: www.olmh-hk.com
- Lists: Hospitals in Hong Kong

Our Lady of Maryknoll Hospital (Chinese: 聖母醫院; Cantonese Yale: Singmóuh Yīyún; OLMH) is a Roman Catholic hospital at Wong Tai Sin area in New Kowloon of Hong Kong.

== History ==
Our Lady of Maryknoll Hospital was founded by the Maryknoll Sisters and officially opened by D. J. M. Mackenzie, Director of Medical and Health Services, on 11 December 1961.

It became a public hospital in 1991.

== Services ==
As of March 2013, the hospital has 236 beds and around 721 members of staff. For the year ended 31 March 2013, it has treated 10,290 inpatients and day-patients, 67,350 specialist outpatients, and 415,159 general outpatients.
