= List of hospitals in Hong Kong =

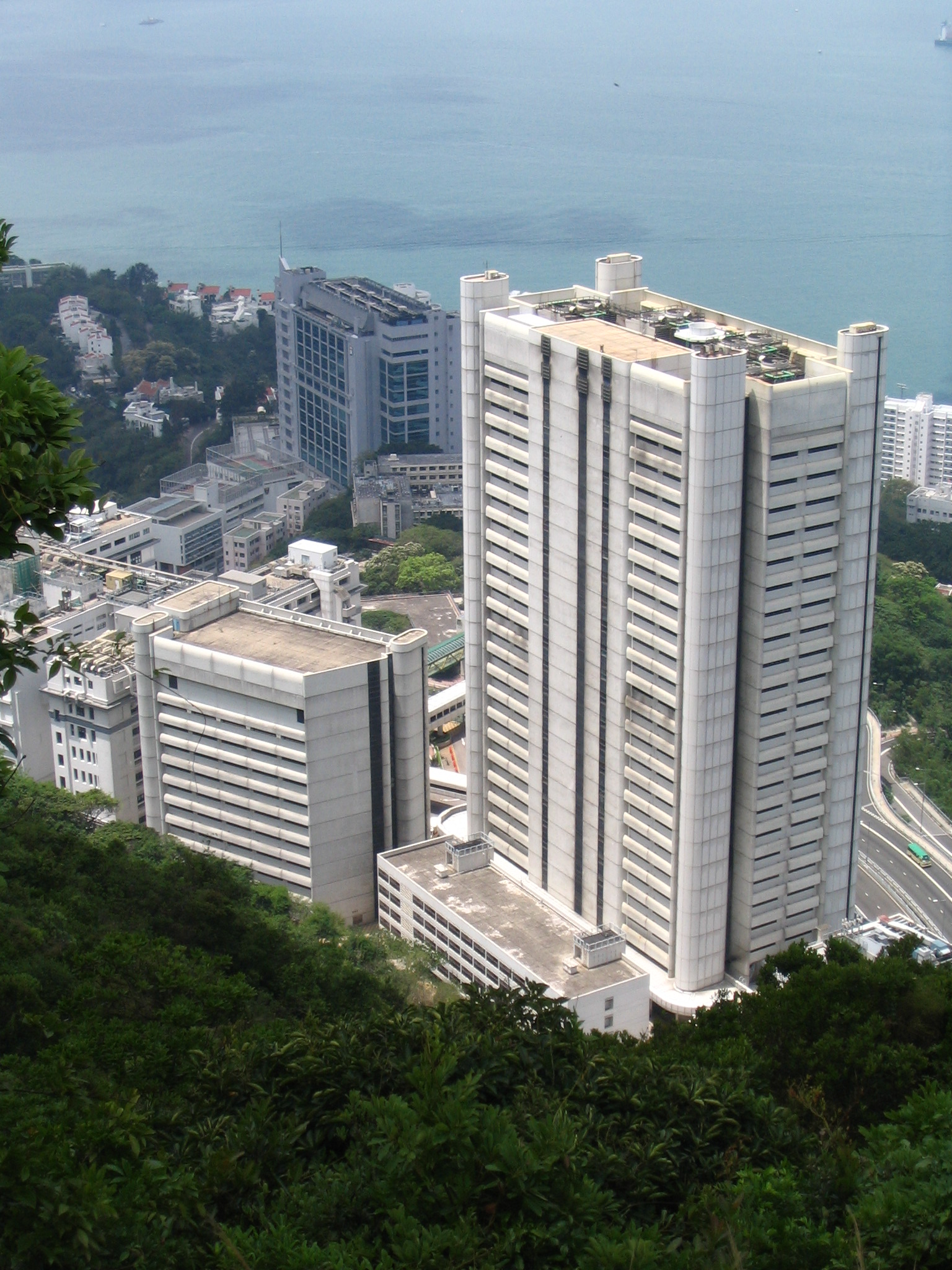
Queen Mary Hospital (QMH), on Hong Kong Island

This is a list of hospitals and other medical facilities in Hong Kong alongside their official abbreviations.

== Public hospitals ==
All public hospitals in Hong Kong are managed by the Hospital Authority. They are organised into seven hospital clusters based on their locations.

=== Hong Kong Island Cluster (HKIC) ===
- Grantham Hospital (GH)^{W}
- MacLehose Medical Rehabilitation Centre (MMRC)^{W}
- Queen Mary Hospital (QMH)^{W}
- The Duchess of Kent Children's Hospital at Sandy Bay (DKCH)^{W}
- Tsan Yuk Hospital (TYH)^{W}
- Tung Wah Group of Hospitals Fung Yiu King Hospital (FYKH)^{W}
- Tung Wah Hospital (TWH)^{W}
- Cheshire Home, Chung Hom Kok (CCH)^{E}
- Pamela Youde Nethersole Eastern Hospital (PYNEH)^{E}
- Ruttonjee Hospital (RH)^{E}
- St. John Hospital (SJH)^{E}
- Tang Shiu Kin Hospital (TSKH)^{E}
- Tung Wah Eastern Hospital (TWEH)^{E}
- Wong Chuk Hang Hospital (WCHH)^{E}

Hong Kong West Cluster (HKWC) and Hong Kong East Cluster (HKEC) were merged into HKIC in 2026, legends below indicate that the hospital was:

^{W}: Formerly in HKWC

^{E}: Formerly in HKEC

=== Kowloon Central Cluster (KCC) ===
- Hong Kong Buddhist Hospital (HKBH)
- Hong Kong Children's Hospital (HKCH)
- Hong Kong Eye Hospital (HKEH)
- Kowloon Hospital (KH)
- Kwong Wah Hospital (KWH)
- Our Lady of Maryknoll Hospital (OLMH)
- TWGHs Wong Tai Sin Hospital (WTSH)
- Queen Elizabeth Hospital (QEH)
- Kai Tak Hospital (KTH) (under construction, to gradually replace QEH)

=== Kowloon West Cluster (KWC) ===
- Caritas Medical Centre (CMC)
- Kwai Chung Hospital (KCH)
- North Lantau Hospital (NTLH)
- Princess Margaret Hospital (PMH)
- Yan Chai Hospital (YCH)

=== Kowloon East Cluster (KEC) ===
- Haven of Hope Hospital (HHH)
- Tseung Kwan O Hospital (TKOH)
- United Christian Hospital (UCH)

=== New Territories East Cluster (NTEC) ===
- Alice Ho Miu Ling Nethersole Hospital (AHNH)
- Bradbury Hospice (BBH)
- Cheshire Home, Shatin (SCH)
- North District Hospital (NDH)
- Prince of Wales Hospital (PWH)
- Shatin Hospital (SH)
- Tai Po Hospital (TPH)

=== New Territories West Cluster (NTWC) ===
- Castle Peak Hospital (CPH)
- Pok Oi Hospital (POH)
- Siu Lam Hospital (SLH)
- Tin Shui Wai Hospital (TSWH)
- Tuen Mun Hospital (TMH)

== Private hospitals ==
- Canossa Hospital
- CUHK Medical Centre (CUHKMC)
- Evangel Hospital
- Gleneagles Hospital Hong Kong
- Hong Kong Adventist Hospital – Stubbs Road
- Hong Kong Adventist Hospital – Tsuen Wan
- Hong Kong Baptist Hospital
- Hong Kong Sanatorium & Hospital
- Matilda International Hospital
- Precious Blood Hospital
- St. Paul's Hospital (SPH)
- St. Teresa's Hospital (STH)
- Union Hospital (UH)

== Teaching hospitals ==
- CUHK Medical Centre (CUHKMC)
- Gleneagles Hospital Hong Kong
- Queen Mary Hospital (QMH)
- Prince of Wales Hospital (PWH)
- Prince Philip Dental Hospital (PPDH)

== Future hospitals ==
- Kai Tak Hospital (KTH) – proposed in 2015 Policy Address, located near Hong Kong Children's Hospital at old Kai Tak Airport site

== Defunct clusters ==
- Hong Kong West Cluster (HKWC)
- Hong Kong East Cluster (HKEC)

HKWC and HKEC were merged and replaced by HKIC on 1 April, 2026. See HKIC (in above) for details.

== Defunct hospitals ==
- HMS Minden, 1843–1857
- Medical Missionary Hospital Hong Kong, 1843–1853
- Seamen's Hospital, 1843–1873
- Government Civil Hospital, c. 1849–1937
- Sai Ying Pun Hospital 1937–1978
- Lock Hospital, 1858–1894 – venereal diseases hospital
- Cheung Chau Fong Bin Hospital, 1872–1988
- Royal Naval Hospital, 1873–1949
- British Military Hospital, Hong Kong, 1907–1996
- Lai Chi Kok Hospital, 1938–2004
- Hong Kong Central Hospital, 1966–2012
- Nam Long Hospital, 1967–2003
- Victoria Hospital, Hong Kong, 1903–1945

== See also ==
- List of buildings and structures in Hong Kong
- List of hospitals in China
- Trent Accreditation Scheme
