= Hong Kong Eye Hospital =

- Hospital Authority

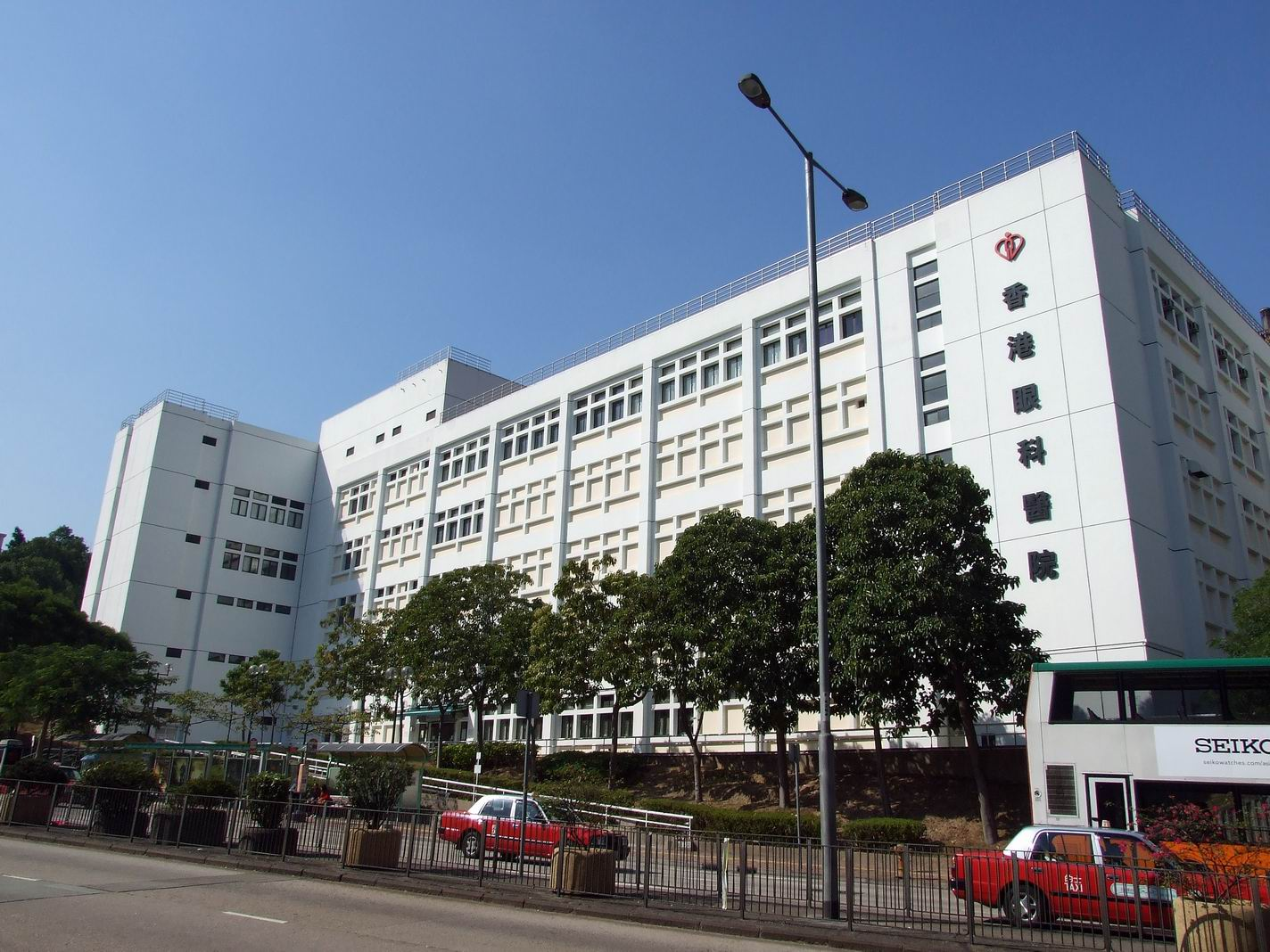

- Location within Hong Kong

Geography
- Location: 147K Argyle Street, Kowloon City District, Kowloon, Hong Kong
- Coordinates: 22°19′30″N 114°11′5″E

Organisation
- Type: Specialist, Teaching
- Affiliated university: The Chinese University of Hong Kong
- Network: Kowloon Central Cluster

Services
- Emergency department: No Accident & Emergency at Queen Elizabeth Hospital

Helipads
- Helipad: No

History
- Founded: 15 September 1993; 32 years ago

Links
- Lists: Hospitals in Hong Kong

Hong Kong Eye Hospital
- Traditional Chinese: 香港眼科醫院
Transcriptions
Yue: Cantonese
- Yale Romanization: Hēung góng ngáahn fō yī yún
- Jyutping: Hoeng1 gong2 ngaan5 fo1 ji1 jyun2

Hong Kong Eye Hospital (Chinese: 香港眼科醫院; HKEH), located in Kowloon City District, Hong Kong, is a secondary and tertiary eye referral centre, and also the house of the Department of Ophthalmology and Visual Science of the Chinese University of Hong Kong (CUHK). The hospital provides training programmes in ophthalmology for medical students of both the CUHK and the University of Hong Kong.

== History ==
Hong Kong Eye Hospital was officially opened on 15 September 1993 by David Robert Ford, Chief Secretary of Hong Kong.
