= Tung Wah Group of Hospitals Fung Yiu King Hospital =

- Hospital Authority and Tung Wah Group of Hospitals

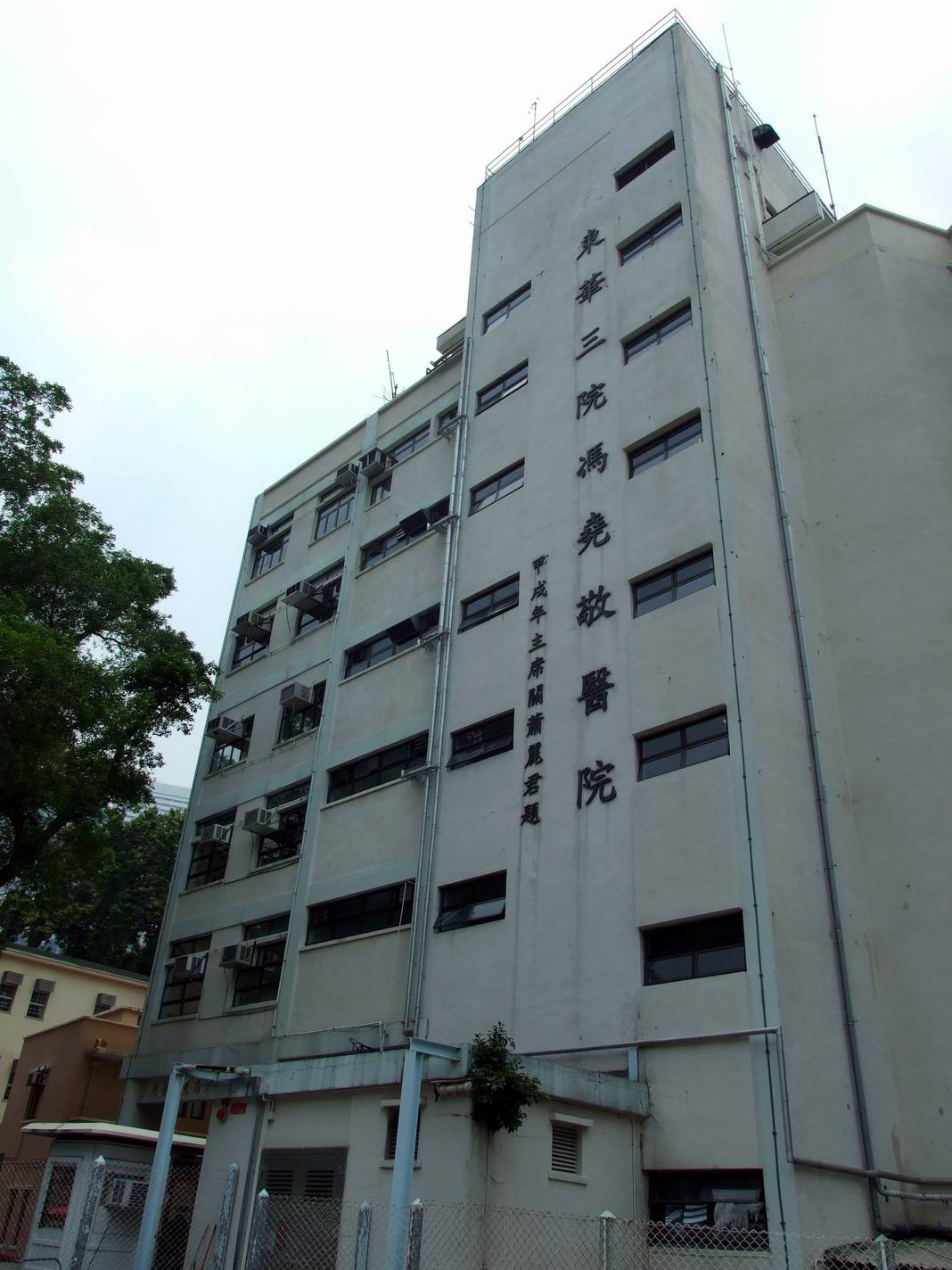

- Location within Hong Kong

Geography
- Location: 9 Sandy Bay Road, Pok Fu Lam, Hong Kong Island, Hong Kong
- Coordinates: 22°16′18″N 114°07′29″E

Organisation
- Type: Specialist
- Network: Hong Kong West Cluster

Services
- Emergency department: No Accident & Emergency at Queen Mary Hospital
- Beds: 272
- Speciality: Geriatrics

Helipads
- Helipad: No

Links
- Website: www.ha.org.hk/fykh/
- Lists: Hospitals in Hong Kong

Tung Wah Group of Hospitals Fung Yiu King Hospital (Chinese: 東華三院馮堯敬醫院; Cantonese Yale: Dūngwàh Sāamyún Fùhngyìuhging Yīyún; FYKH) is a charitable geriatric service hospital operated by the Tung Wah Group of Hospitals in Sandy Bay on the Hong Kong Island in Hong Kong.

== History ==
The hospital was known as Sandy Bay Infirmary in the 1970s. In 1986, the infirmary was renovated and expanded and soon renamed Fung Yiu King Convalescent Hospital in 1987. It was then renamed to TWGHs Fung Yiu King Hospital in 1994 as service shifted to rehabilitative treatment.
