= Sha Wan =

Sha Wan may refer to:

- Émmanuel-Édouard Chavannes, a French sinologist
- Sandy Bay, a bay in Hong Kong
