= HKBH =

HKBH may refer to:

- Hong Kong Baptist Hospital, a private hospital in Kowloon Tong, Hong Kong
- Hong Kong Buddhist Hospital, a community hospital in Lok Fu, Hong Kong
