= Tung Wah Group of Hospitals Wong Tai Sin Hospital =

- Hospital Authority and Tung Wah Group of Hospitals

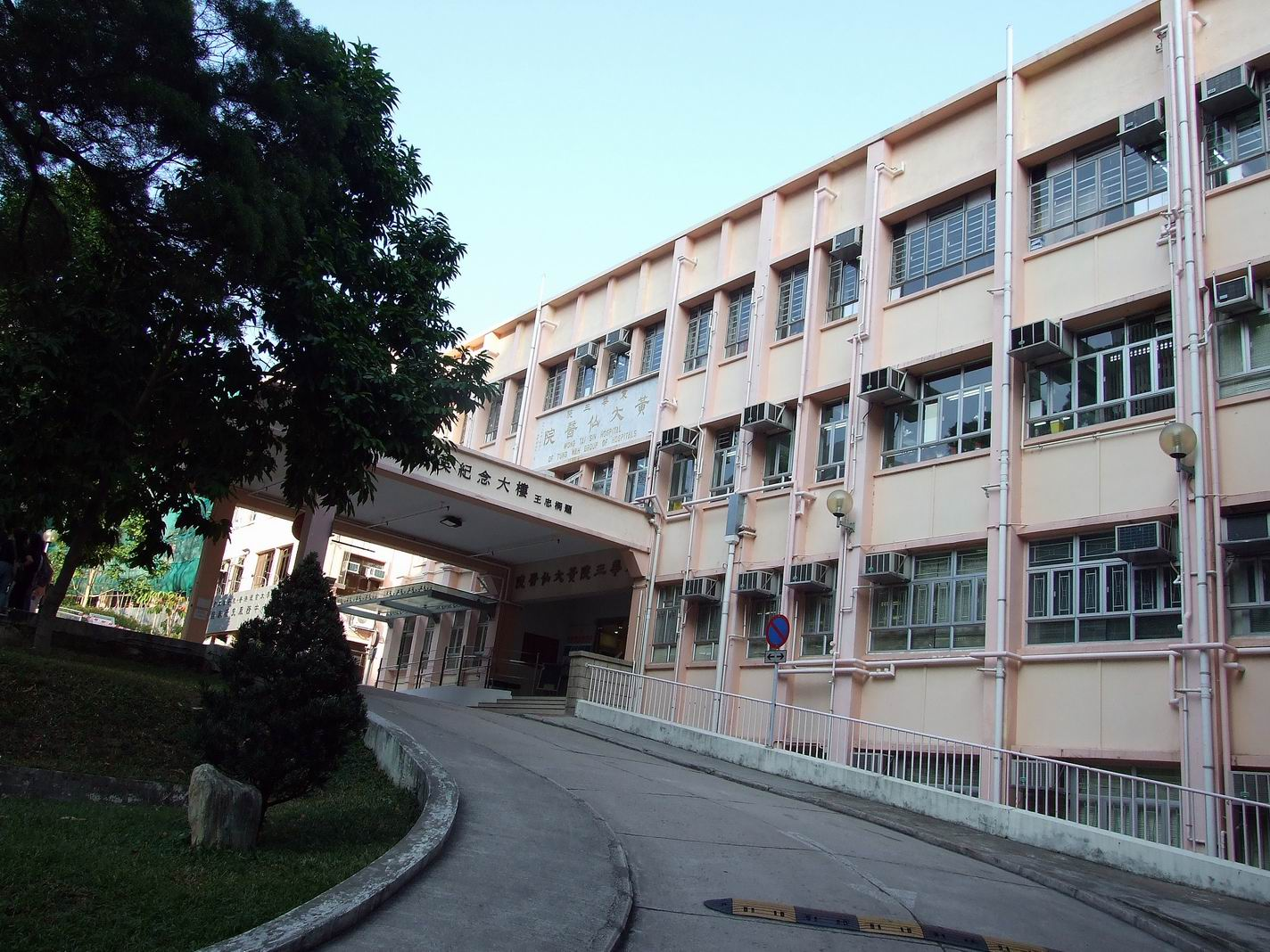

- Location within Hong Kong

Geography
- Location: 124 Shatin Pass Road, Wong Tai Sin, Hong Kong
- Coordinates: 22.34722°N 114.19635°E

Organisation
- Type: Specialist
- Network: Kowloon West Cluster

Services
- Emergency department: No Accident and Emergency at United Christian Hospital, Queen Elizabeth Hospital
- Speciality: Tuberculosis and Chest

Helipads
- Helipad: No

History
- Founded: 1965; 61 years ago

Links
- Lists: Hospitals in Hong Kong

Tung Wah Group of Hospitals Wong Tai Sin Hospital (Chinese: 東華三院黃大仙醫院; WTSH) is Charitable hospital, It is Rehabilitation Hospital under the Tung Wah Group of Hospitals. It is most commonly referred to by its short name TWGHs Wong Tai Sin Hospital or just Wong Tai Sin Hospital. It is one of two hospitals in the Wong Tai Sin area in New Kowloon of Hong Kong.

== History ==
The hospital was established in 1965 and became a public hospital in 1991. The hospital was first developed as an infirmary to treat chronically ill elderly people. It has gradually expanded its role as an extended care institution in which intensive trans-disciplinary rehabilitative training programmes are designed for patients to facilitate their early reintegration into society.
