= Hong Kong Buddhist Hospital =

- Hospital Authority and Hong Kong Buddhist Association
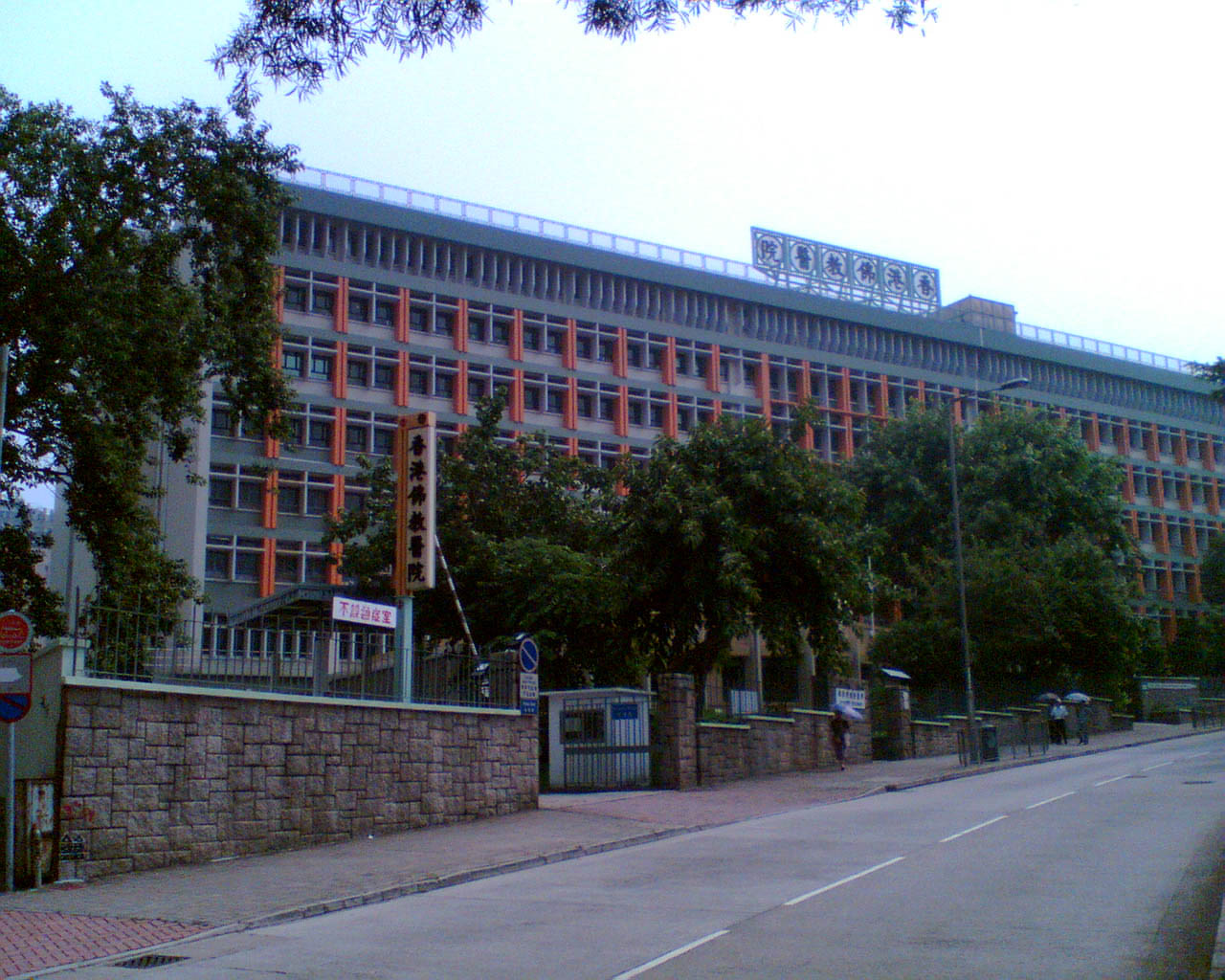

- Location within Hong Kong

Geography
- Location: 10 Heng Lam Street, Lok Fu, Hong Kong
- Coordinates: 22°20′08″N 114°11′19″E

Organisation
- Type: Specialist, Community
- Religious affiliation: Buddhist
- Network: Kowloon Central Cluster

Services
- Emergency department: No, Accident and Emergency at United Christian Hospital and Queen Elizabeth Hospital
- Beds: 324

History
- Founded: 12 March 1971; 55 years ago

Links
- Lists: Hospitals in Hong Kong

Hong Kong Buddhist Hospital
- Traditional Chinese: 香港佛教醫院
- Simplified Chinese: 香港佛教医院
Transcriptions
Standard Mandarin
- Hanyu Pinyin: Xiānggǎng Fójiào Yīyuàn
Yue: Cantonese
- Yale Romanization: Hēunggóng Fahtgaau Yīyún
- Jyutping: hoeng1 gong2 fat6 gaau3 ji1 jyun6*2

Hong Kong Buddhist Hospital (Chinese: 香港佛教醫院; Cantonese Yale: Hēunggóng Fahtgaau Yīyún; HKBH) is Buddhism founded Community hospital with 324 beds in Lok Fu, Hong Kong, within walking distance of Lok Fu station. It is under the Kowloon Central Cluster managed by the Hospital Authority. Its hospital chief executive as of June 2026 is Dr. Chan Wan-kin, Frank.

== History ==
Hong Kong Buddhist Hospital was found by the Hong Kong Buddhist Association. It was started building in 1966 and completed in 1970. It was then opened on 12 March 1971 by the Hong Kong Governor, David Trench. The hospital provided 350 beds and cost HK$14 million, HK$2 million of which was donated by the Royal Hong Kong Jockey Club.

== Services ==
As of March 2013, the hospital had 324 beds and around 370 members of staff. For the year ended 31 March 2013, it had treated 8,631 inpatients and day-patients, 11,464 specialist outpatients, and 45,432 general outpatients.
