= Kowloon Central Cluster =

Hospital network in Hong Kong

- 九龍中醫院聯網
- Logo of the Kowloon Central Cluster
- Region served: HK
- Services: Health care
- Cluster Chief Executive: Dr. Eric Cheung
- Parent organisation: Hospital Authority
- Staff: 17,515 (2019/20)
- Website: www.ha.org.hk/kcc/

Kowloon Central Cluster (Chinese: 九龍中醫院聯網; KCC) is one of the six hospital clusters managed by Hospital Authority in Hong Kong. It consists of nince public hospitals, one institution and 13 family medicine clinics (FMC), formerly known as general outpatient clinics (GOPC) (Note: GOPCs have been officially renamed to FMCs in Oct 2025, see this press release). It provides public healthcare services for the population of Yau Ma Tei, Mong Kok, Tsim Sha Tsui, Kowloon City, and Wong Tai Sin. Its cluster chief executive as of June 2026 is Dr. Eric Cheung.

== Services ==
Kowloon Central Cluster operates the following nine hospitals of various capabilities to provide a range of acute, convalescent, rehabilitation, and infirmary inpatient and ambulatory care services to the public in the areas of Yau Ma Tei, Tsim Sha Tsui and Kowloon City.

- Kwong Wah Hospital (KWH)
- Our Lady of Maryknoll Hospital (OLMH)
- Tung Wah Group of Hospitals Wong Tai Sin Hospital (WTSH)
- Hong Kong Buddhist Hospital (HKBH)
- Hong Kong Eye Hospital (HKEH)
- Kowloon Hospital (KH)
- Queen Elizabeth Hospital (QEH)
- Hong Kong Children's Hospital (HKCH)

Kowloon Central Cluster also operates the Hong Kong Red Cross Blood Transfusion Service.

The cluster also includes 13 general outpatient clinics:

- Central Kowloon Health Centre
- Community Rehabilitation Service Support Centre
- East Kowloon General Out-patient Clinic
- Hung Hom Clinic
- Kwong Wah Hospital GOPD
- Lee Kee Memorial Dispensary
- Li Po Chun General Out-patient Clinic
- Our Lady of Maryknoll Hospital Family Medicine Clinic
- Robert Black General Out-patient Clinic
- Shun Tak Fraternal Association Leung Kau Kui Clinic
- Wang Tau Hom Jockey Club General Out-patient Clinic
- Wu York Yu General Out-patient Clinic
- Yau Ma Tei Jockey Club General Outpatient Clinic

As of March 2021, the cluster has 5,996 beds, including 5,281 for acute, convalescent and rehabilitation care, 250 for infirmary care and 465 for psychiatric care. In 2020-21, approximately 695 700 patients had utilised services in KCC.
