= Jao Tsung-I =

Hong Kong sinologist and calligrapher

The Honourable Jao Tsung-I GBM
- Born: 9 August 1917; Xiangqiao, Chaoshan, China
- Died: 6 February 2018 (aged 100); Ruttonjee Hospital, Hong Kong
- Resting place: Hong Kong
- Other name: Rao Gu'an (饒固庵)
- Occupations: Sinologist, historian, palaeographer, calligrapher, painter
- Title: Professor of the University of Hong Kong, University of Singapore, Yale University, Academia Sinica, Chinese University of Hong Kong
- Spouse: Chen Ruonong
- Children: 2
- Parent: Rao E (饒鍔)
- Awards: 1982: D.Litt (HKU); 1997: Life Achievement Award (HKADC); 2000: GBM

Chinese name
- Traditional Chinese: 饒宗頤
- Simplified Chinese: 饶宗颐
Transcriptions
Standard Mandarin
- Hanyu Pinyin: Ráo Zōngyí
- Wade–Giles: Jao^{2} Tsung^{1}-i^{2}
- IPA: [ɻǎʊ tsʊ́ŋ.ǐ]
Yue: Cantonese
- Yale Romanization: Yìuh Jūng-yìh
- Jyutping: Jiu^{4} Zung^{1}-ji^{4}
- IPA: [jiw˩ tsʊŋ˥.ji˩]
Southern Min
- Hokkien POJ: Jiâu Chong-Î
- Teochew Peng'im: Riou^{5} Zong^{1}hi^{1}

Jao Tsung-I or Rao Zongyi (Chinese: 饒宗頤; 9 August 1917 – 6 February 2018) was a Chinese sinologist, calligrapher, historian and painter. A versatile and prolific scholar, he contributed to many fields of humanities, including history, archaeology, epigraphy, folklore, religion, art history, musicology, literature, and Near Eastern Studies. He published more than 100 books and about 1,000 academic articles over a career spanning more than 80 years.

Jao and Ji Xianlin were considered China's two greatest humanities academics by their contemporaries. Called the "pride of Hong Kong" by Chinese Premier Li Keqiang, Jao has won many awards including the Grand Bauhinia Medal, the highest honour bestowed by the Hong Kong government. The Jao Tsung-I Petite Ecole of the University of Hong Kong, the Jao Studies Foundation, and the Jao Tsung-I Academy in Kowloon have been founded in his name.

== Early life and education ==
Jao was born in 1917 in Chao'an (now Xiangqiao) into a scholarly Teochew family of Hakka ancestry.

He also used the courtesy names Gu'an and Bolian, and the art name Xuantang. Largely home-schooled and self-taught, he wrote The Scholastic Journals of Gu Tinglin at the age of 14.

== Career ==
Jao taught at several colleges in mainland China before moving to Hong Kong in 1949. In the following years, he taught at the University of Hong Kong, the National University of Singapore, Institute of History and Philology of Academia Sinica in Taiwan, the Chinese University of Hong Kong, École française d'Extrême-Orient, École pratique des hautes études of Paris, and Yale University in the US. He was also honorary professor at several prestigious mainland Chinese universities including Peking University, Fudan University, Nanjing University, and Zhejiang University.

=== Academic research ===
Jao was a highly versatile and prolific scholar. His research covered a vast range of humanities, including oracle bones, archaeology, epigraphy, folklores, religion, art history, musicology, literature, and Near Eastern Studies. Over his 80-year-long career, he published more than 100 books and about 1,000 scholarly papers. Under the influence of the French Assyriologist Jean Bottéro, he learnt cuneiform and spent ten years translating the Akkadian epic Enūma Eliš into Chinese, filling a major gap in Chinese knowledge of ancient Babylon.

In 1959, he published Yindai zhenbu renwu tongkao (殷代貞卜人物通考; 'Oracle Bone Diviners of the Yin Dynasty'), which earned him the Prix Stanislas Julien from the Académie des Inscriptions et Belles-Lettres in 1962. In 2000, he was awarded the Grand Bauhinia Medal, the highest honour bestowed by the Hong Kong government.

=== Arts ===
In addition to his academic pursuits, Jao was also a renowned calligrapher, painter, and musician. He created his own calligraphic style called Jao's Clerical Script. His calligraphic art installation, "The Wisdom Path", has become a landmark in Ngong Ping, Hong Kong. He was a master performer of the ancient Chinese instrument guqin.

In August 2017, the Hongkong Post issued a set of six special stamps featuring Jao's paintings and calligraphy.

== Death ==
He died on 6 February 2018, at the age of 100 (101 by East Asian age reckoning).

== See also ==
- Jao Tsung-I Academy
