= Duchess of Kent Children's Hospital at Sandy Bay =

Hospital in Hong Kong Island

The Duchess of Kent Children's Hospital at Sandy Bay
- Hospital Authority and the Society for the Relief of Disabled Children
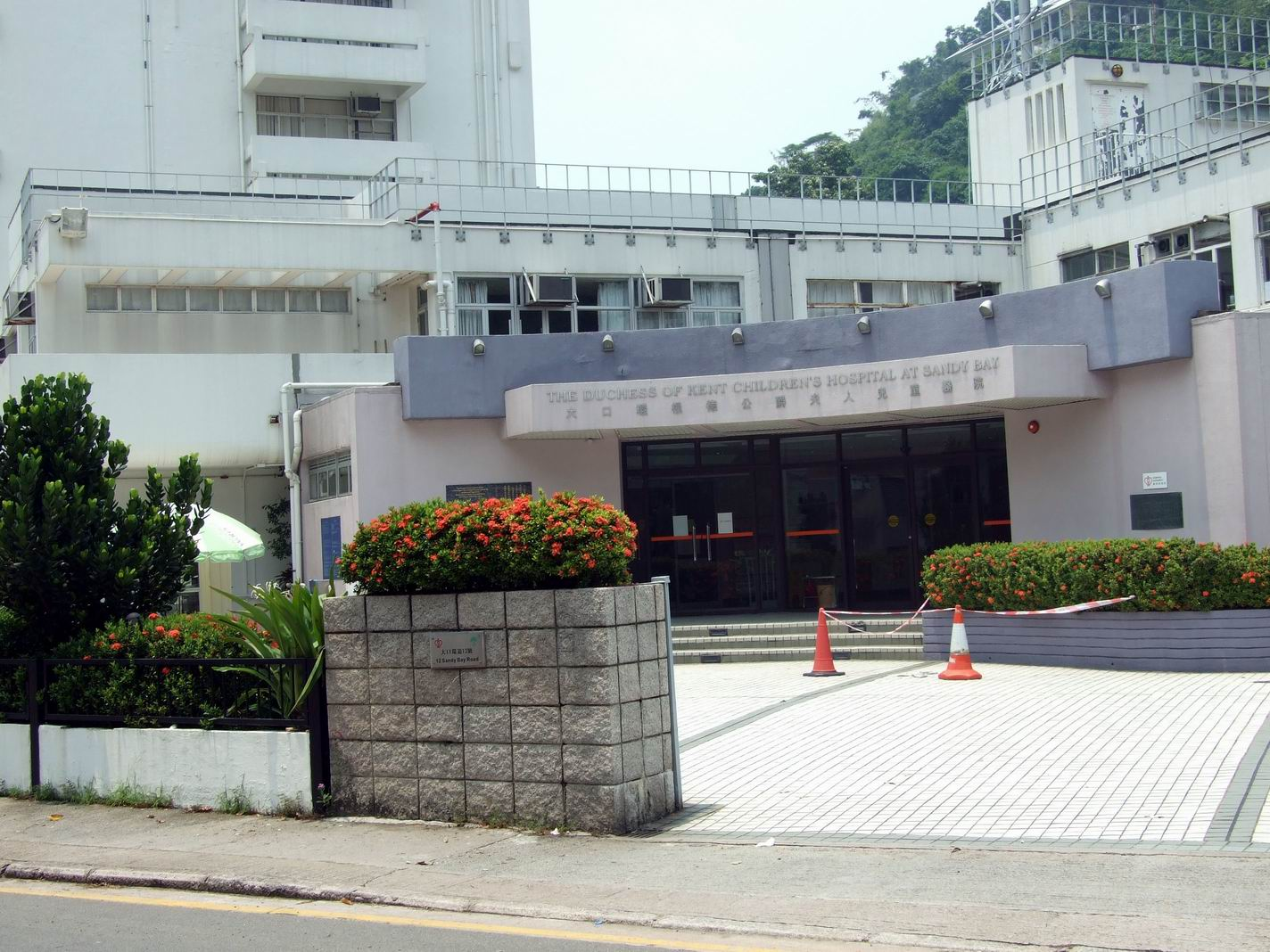

- Location within Hong Kong

Geography
- Location: 12 Sandy Bay Road, Sandy Bay, Pok Fu Lam, Hong Kong Island, Hong Kong
- Coordinates: 22°16′16″N 114°07′26″E

Organisation
- Care system: Public
- Type: Specialist, Teaching
- Affiliated university: Li Ka Shing Faculty of Medicine, University of Hong Kong
- Network: Hong Kong West Cluster

Services
- Emergency department: No; Accident & Emergency at Queen Mary Hospital
- Beds: 130

Helipads
- Helipad: No

History
- Founded: 1955

Links
- Website: www.ha.org.hk/dkch/
- Lists: Hospitals in Hong Kong

Duchess of Kent Children's Hospital at Sandy Bay
- Traditional Chinese: 大口環根德公爵夫人兒童醫院
- Simplified Chinese: 大口环根德公爵夫人儿童医院
- Cantonese Yale: Daaihháuwàahn Gāndāk Gūngjeuk Fūyàhn Yìhtùhng Yīyún
Transcriptions
Standard Mandarin
- Hanyu Pinyin: Dàkǒuhuán Gēndé Gōngjuéfūrén Értóng Yīyuàn
Yue: Cantonese
- Yale Romanization: Daaihháuwàahn Gāndāk Gūngjeuk Fūyàhn Yìhtùhng Yīyún
- Jyutping: daai6 hau2 waan4 gan1 dak1 gung1 zoek3 fu1 jan4 ji4 tung4 ji1 jyun6*2

The Duchess of Kent Children's Hospital at Sandy Bay (Chinese: 大口環根德公爵夫人兒童醫院; Cantonese Yale: Daaihháuwàahn Gāndāk Gūngjeuk Fūyàhn Yìhtùhng Yīyún; DKCH) is a paediatric hospital in Sandy Bay on Hong Kong Island in Hong Kong.

For decades before the opening of the Hong Kong Children's Hospital in 2018 the hospital was the only specialist paediatric hospital in Hong Kong. Founded in 1955 by the Society for the Relief of Disabled Children, it provides specialist services in paediatric orthopaedics, spinal surgery, paediatric neurology, developmental paediatrics and paediatric dental surgery while also providing treatment, rehabilitative services and accommodation for patients over 18 years old, specifically orthopaedic patients with spinal problems.

== History ==
Its reputation was built first in the 1950s and 1960s, when it became known as the clinical research center that developed the "Hong Kong Operation", a breakthrough anterior approach to treat spinal tuberculosis, something that was then rife in Hong Kong's refugee squatter camps. Orthopaedic teams from the University of Hong Kong’s Department of Surgery (the forerunners of today’s Department of Orthopaedics and Traumatology at the University of Hong Kong’s Medical Centre) working at the hospital pioneered the operation, most notably the "Hodgson/Yau" surgical team of Dr (later Professor) A. R. Hodgson and Dr (later Professor) Arthur Yau Meng-choy. The pair's ground-breaking anterior approach was adopted across the world.

Until 1971, the facility was known as the "Sandy Bay Children's Convalescent Home". During this time, it was a voluntary aided facility. The nursing teams came from the Irish Catholic religious order, The Missionary Society of St. Columban, while the majority of the day-to-day funding came from the Society for the Relief of Disabled Children, who, under the enigmatic leadership of the society's president, stockbroker Noel Croucher, ran a series of high-profile events to raise the home's profile. In 1970, Katharine, Duchess of Kent visited and when the facility upgraded from "Convalescent Home" to "Hospital" in 1971, it took her name. The Duchess remained the hospital patron. Colloquially, because of its location and its name changes, it is often simply referred to as "Sandy Bay".

The Hong Kong Hospital Authority has managed the day-to-day affairs of The Duchess of Kent Children's Hospital since 1991, while the Society for the Relief of Disabled Children continues to support the hospital "with specific needs or in emerging areas of child health that are not readily available in the public health care system".

=== Nowadays ===
Spinal work continues at the hospital. The Centre for Spinal Disorders provides multidisciplinary service in the assessment, treatment, and rehabilitation of patients with spinal conditions, as well as conducting clinical research and educational programs. It is the only such facility in the region.

The Children's Habilitation Institute provides habilitation and rehabilitation programs for children with various neuro-developmental problems. It is the only such public health facility in Hong Kong and serves as a model center for habilitation and rehabilitation of children with chronic handicap in China and across Asia.

The Duchess of Kent Children's Hospital is affiliated with the Li Ka Shing Faculty of Medicine at the University of Hong Kong and provides clinical attachment opportunities for the Faculty's medical students.
