= Lai Chi Kok Hospital =

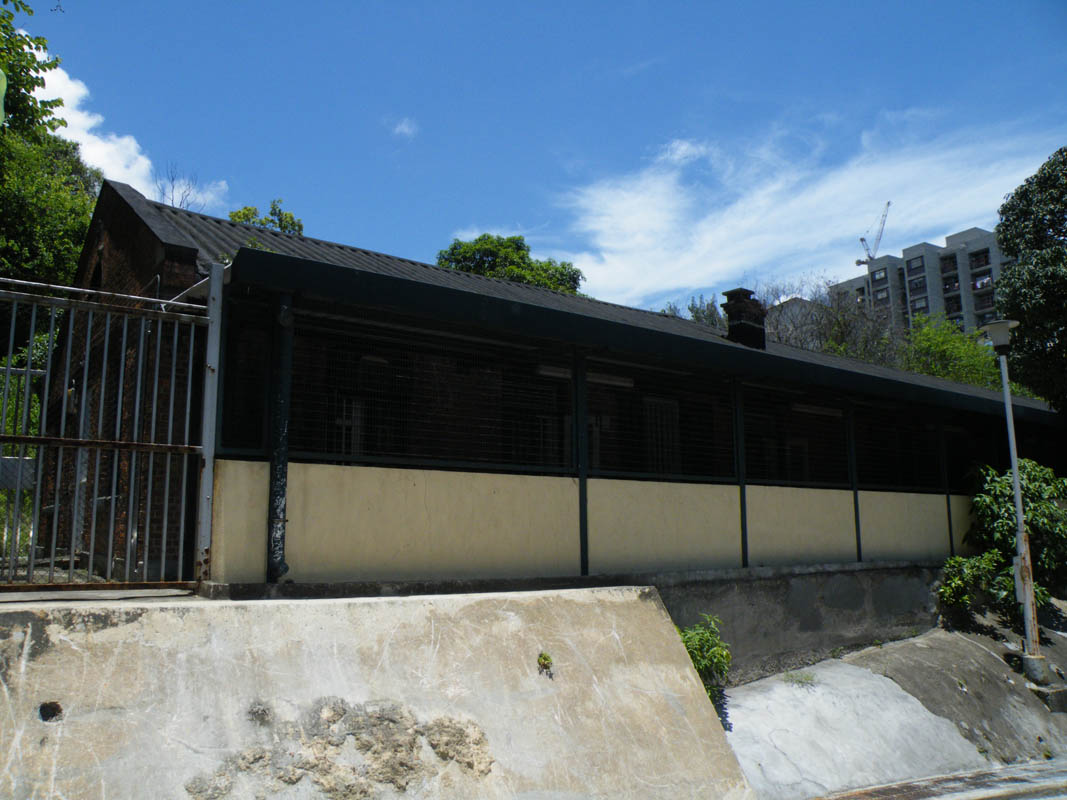

- Location within Hong Kong

Geography
- Location: 800 Castle Peak Road, Lai Chi Kok, Hong Kong
- Coordinates: 22.337922°N 114.141976°E

History
- Founded: 1938; 88 years ago
- Closed: June 2004; 22 years ago

Links
- Lists: Hospitals in Hong Kong

Hong Kong Graded Building – Grade III
- Designated: 24 June 2010; 16 years ago
- Reference no.: 845

Lai Chi Kok Hospital
- Traditional Chinese: 荔枝角醫院
Transcriptions
Yue: Cantonese
- Yale Romanization: Laih jī gok yī yún
- Jyutping: Lai6 zi1 gok3 ji1 jyun2

The former Lai Chi Kok Hospital (Chinese:荔枝角醫院), located at No.800 Castle Peak Road, Lai Chi Kok, Kowloon, was listed as one of the Grade III historic buildings in Hong Kong. It was originally built a prison between 1921 and 1924, then converted into a hospital for infectious diseases around 1930s. The site has now been transformed into Jao Tsung-I Academy under batch 1 of the Hong Kong Government's revitalization scheme.

== History ==
In the 19th Century, the hospital first served as a labourers' dormitory for The Chamber of Mines Labour Importation Agency. In 1912, the British Army set up the Lai Chi Kok Barracks and was stationed there for two years. It became Lai Chi Kok Internment Camp later in 1924. The camp was then closed until the establishment of Stanley Prison in 1937.

In the same year, Hong Kong became an epidemic zone under the spread of smallpox. The site was then converted into Lai Chi Kok (Cholera) Hospital and Lai Chi Kok (Relief) Hospital for infectious diseases. In 1948, the two hospitals were renamed Lai Chi Kok Hospital (Chinese:荔枝角醫院), which was one of the two infectious hospitals in Hong Kong at the time. The other infectious hospital was in Sai Ying Pun. Those patients from the Hei Ling Chau hospital for leprosy were sent to the reconstructed hospital. After the opening of Princess Margaret Hospital (Chinese:瑪嘉烈醫院) in 1975, the role of Lai Chi Kok Hospital as an infectious diseases hospital gradually diminished. The hospital was later changed to serve long-term psychiatric patients transferred from Castle Peak Hospital (Chinese:青山醫院).

In the early 2000s, the Hospital Authority planned to send its 400 mental patients to different psychiatric hospitals and transformed the site into a long-term nursing home under the supervision of the Social Welfare Department for patients who were queuing for such service. While the SWD refused to take it over, the HA then set up H.A. Care Limited to manage the hospital. In June 2004, patients were relocated to Caritas Jockey Club Lai King Rehabilitation Centre, which was completed in April 2005, and was the former site of Lai Chi Kok Hospital, which was returned to the SAR government. At that time the site was planned to be reconstructed as the staff dormitory of Correctional Services Department as well as their families.

== Current situation ==
Lai Chi Kok Hospital became one of seven buildings in the Revitalising Historic Buildings Through Partnership Scheme launched by Development Bureau in 2008. The Hong Kong Cultural Heritage was successfully selected by The Hong Kong Institution for Promotion of Chinese Culture to carry out the project. The site is named Jao Tsung-I Academy promoting Chinese culture education. Phase 1 is open since June 2012 and phase 2 was completed in 2013. Free public access is allowed to the Chinese landscaped gardens, conservation gallery and a heritage gallery. The area is around 32,000 m2 and the building is set up as a cultural hostel with 85 guest rooms.

== Public review ==
Editorials in Hong Kong commented on the slow revitalisation progress of the architecture. Apple Daily reported the re-denomination of the cultural center. It was named Hong Kong Cultural Legacy Centre (香港文化傳承中心), and later was named after the master of national art – Jao Tsung-I Academy. Ta Kung Pao reported the delay due to filibuster in May.
