= Hong Kong Children's Hospital =

- Hospital Authority
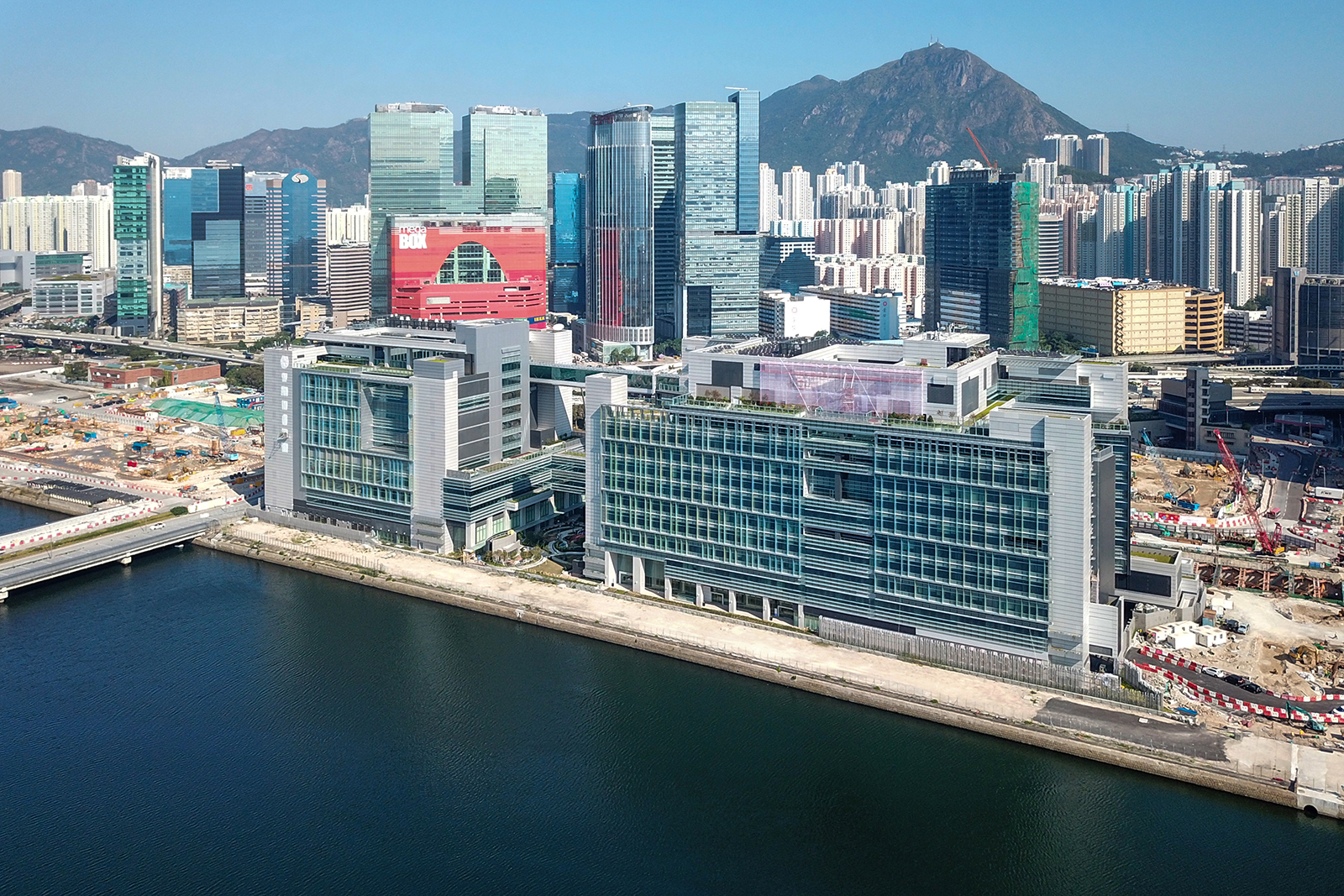
- Pictured in 2018

- Location within Hong Kong

Geography
- Location: Kai Tak Development Area, Kowloon, Hong Kong
- Coordinates: 22°18′56″N 114°12′32″E

Organisation
- Type: Specialist
- Affiliated university: Faculty of Medicine of The Chinese University of Hong Kong; Li Ka Shing Faculty of Medicine, University of Hong Kong
- Network: Kowloon Central Cluster

Services
- Emergency department: No Accident & Emergency
- Beds: 468
- Speciality: Paediatrics

Helipads
- Helipad: No

History
- Founded: 18 December 2018; 7 years ago

Links
- Website: www.ha.org.hk/hkch/
- Lists: Hospitals in Hong Kong

Hong Kong Children's Hospital
- Traditional Chinese: 香港兒童醫院
- Simplified Chinese: 香港儿童医院
Transcriptions
Standard Mandarin
- Hanyu Pinyin: Xiānggǎng Értóng Yīyuàn
Yue: Cantonese
- Yale Romanization: Hēunggóng Yìhtùhng Yīyún
- Jyutping: hoeng1 gong2 ji4 tung4 ji1 jyun6*2

Hong Kong Children's Hospital (Chinese: 香港兒童醫院; Cantonese Yale: Hēunggóng Yìhtùhng Yīyún; HKCH) is the first children hospital in Hong Kong's public healthcare system, located in Kowloon City, Hong Kong. Located at the south apron of the former Kai Tak Airport, the hospital has 468 beds for inpatients and day-patients, providing mainly tertiary services for complex and rare paediatric cases. Funded by the Hong Kong Government, construction of the HK$13 billion hospital began in August 2013. The hospital treats patients with a referral up to 19 years of age.

The hospital first focuses on cancer and kidney diseases in the first phase of operation in December 2018. Services currently available include oncology and haematology, nephrology, metabolic medicine, intensive care, paediatric surgery, neurosurgery, pathology, anaesthesia, radiology, pharmacy and allied health services. Other clinical services will commence gradually.

== History ==
The hospital, originally named the Centre of Excellence in Paediatrics, was first announced in the 2007 policy address given by Donald Tsang, the former Chief Executive of Hong Kong. The site chosen for the hospital used to be the headquarters of the Royal Hong Kong Auxiliary Air Force.

A design-and-build contract for the new hospital was awarded in July 2013 to a joint venture comprising Chinese state-owned contractor China State and Hong Kong firm Shui On Construction. The structural engineer was Meinhardt while the building services engineer was J. Roger Preston Limited. The architect was Simon Kwan and Associates. Construction began in August 2013.

In February 2014, the hospital was officially renamed Hong Kong Children's Hospital. It opened on 18 December 2018, initially offering paediatric haematology and oncology ward, paediatric intensive care unit and operating theatre services. The first inpatient services commenced on 27 March 2019, namely: the paediatric haematology and oncology ward, paediatric intensive care unit and operating theatre services.

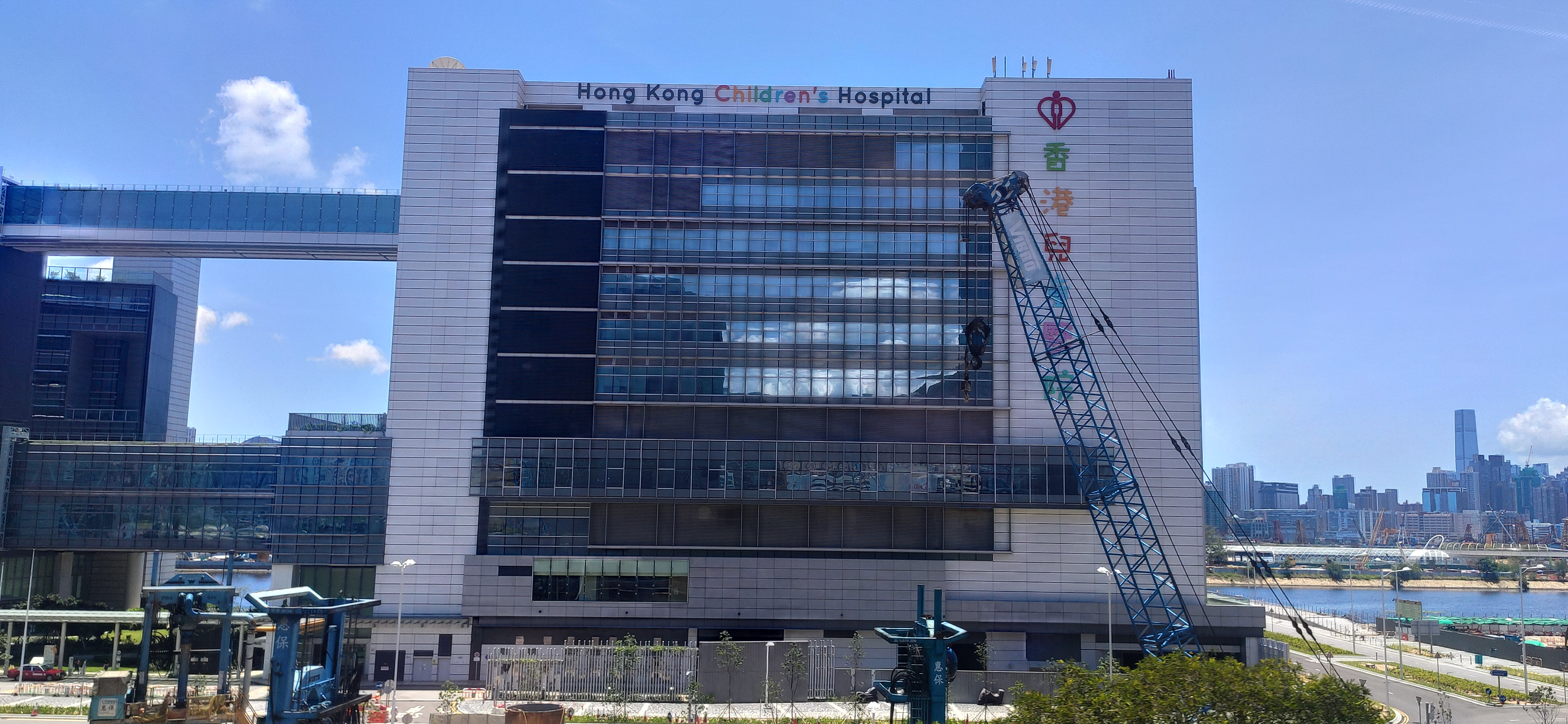
Hong Kong Children's Hospital in 2020

In February 2025, Hong Kong Children’s Hospital suspended its ear, nose, and throat department due to a shortage of staff.

== Transport ==
Green Minibus

- Route 86 to Telford Plaza in Kowloon Bay
- Route 90A to Yai Lai Estate in Yau Tong
- Route 90B to Sau Mau Ping

Bus

- KMB Route 5R to Kwun Tong via Ngau Tau Kok
- Citybus Route 22 to Festival Walk in Kowloon Tong
- Citybus Route 22M to Prince Edward Road East in Kowloon City.

Rehabus Feeder Service

- The Hospital provides Rehabus feeder service for patients in need.

== See also ==
- The Duchess of Kent Children's Hospital at Sandy Bay – another Hong Kong paediatric specialist hospital
