= Kowloon Hospital =

- Hospital Authority
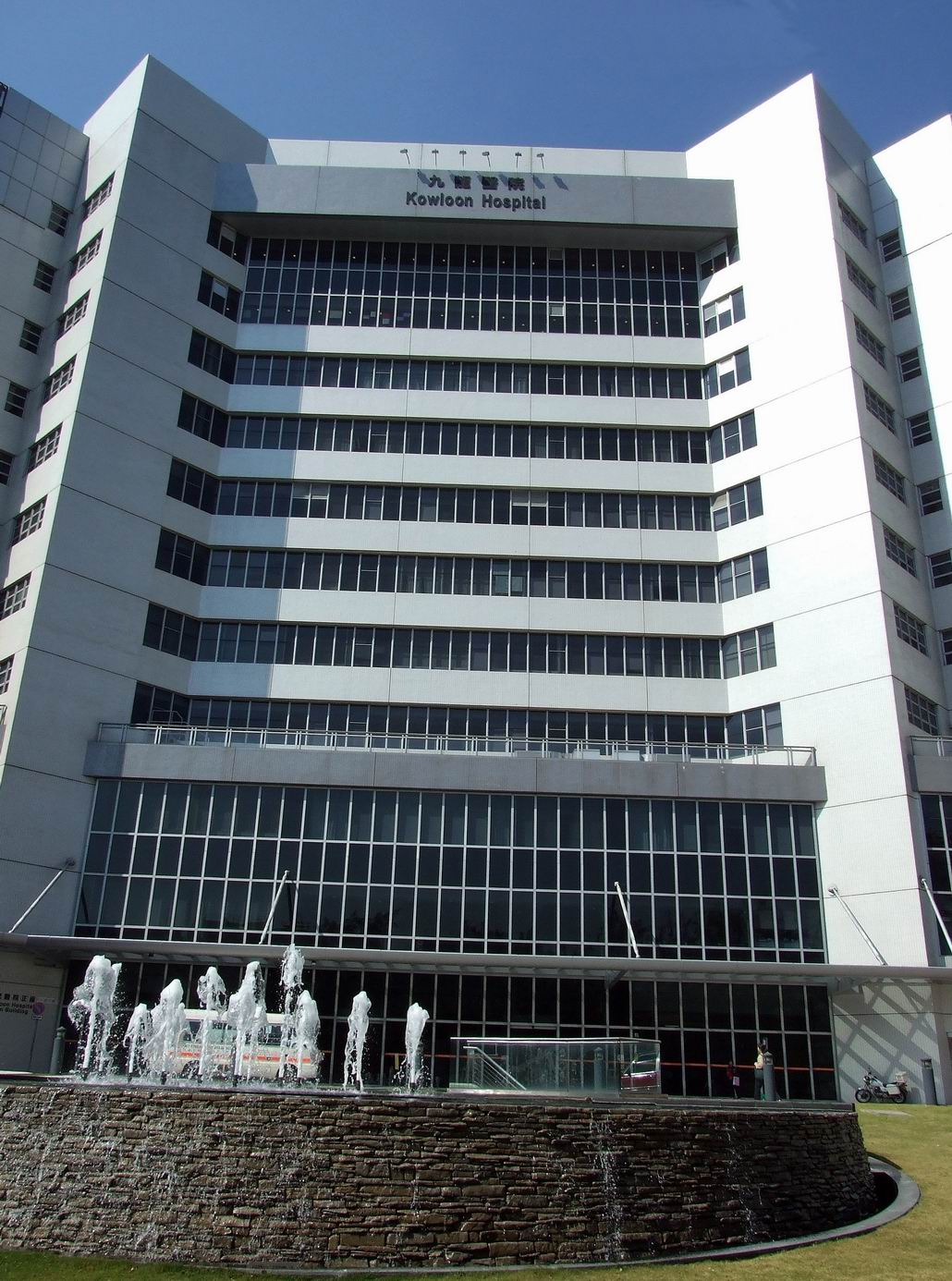
- Kowloon Hospital Main Building in November 2007

- Location within Hong Kong

Geography
- Location: 147A Argyle Street, Kowloon City District, Kowloon, Hong Kong
- Coordinates: 22°19′27″N 114°10′47″E

Organisation
- Care system: Public
- Type: Teaching, Specialist
- Affiliated university: Medical Faculty of the Chinese University of Hong Kong
- Network: Kowloon Central Cluster

Services
- Emergency department: No, Accident and Emergency at Queen Elizabeth Hospital
- Beds: 1,335

History
- Founded: 24 December 1925; 100 years ago

Links
- Website: www.ha.org.hk/kh
- Lists: Hospitals in Hong Kong

Hong Kong Graded Building – Grade II
- Designated: 18 December 2009; 16 years ago
- Reference no.: 231–238

Hong Kong Graded Building – Grade III
- Designated: 22 January 2010; 16 years ago
- Reference no.: 761 & 811

Kowloon Hospital
- Traditional Chinese: 九龍醫院
Transcriptions
Yue: Cantonese
- Yale Romanization: Gáu lùhng yī yún
- Jyutping: Gau2 lung4 ji1 jyun2

Kowloon Hospital (Chinese: 九龍醫院; KH) is a general care hospital located in Kowloon City District, in Kowloon, Hong Kong. The complex was built on land between Argyle Street and Prince Edward Road.

The hospital used to be an acute hospital with accident and emergency service. It was later converted to a chronic hospital to provide extended supportive care to patients from Queen Elizabeth Hospital. The hospital has specialist services in psychiatry, rehabilitation, respiratory medicine and geriatrics. The respiratory medicine unit provides teaching opportunities for medical students from the Li Ka Shing Faculty of Medicine, University of Hong Kong.

With 1,281 beds, the hospital was the first to establish a rehabilitation unit in Hong Kong.
