= Kwong Wah Hospital =

- Hospital Authority and Tung Wah Group of Hospitals

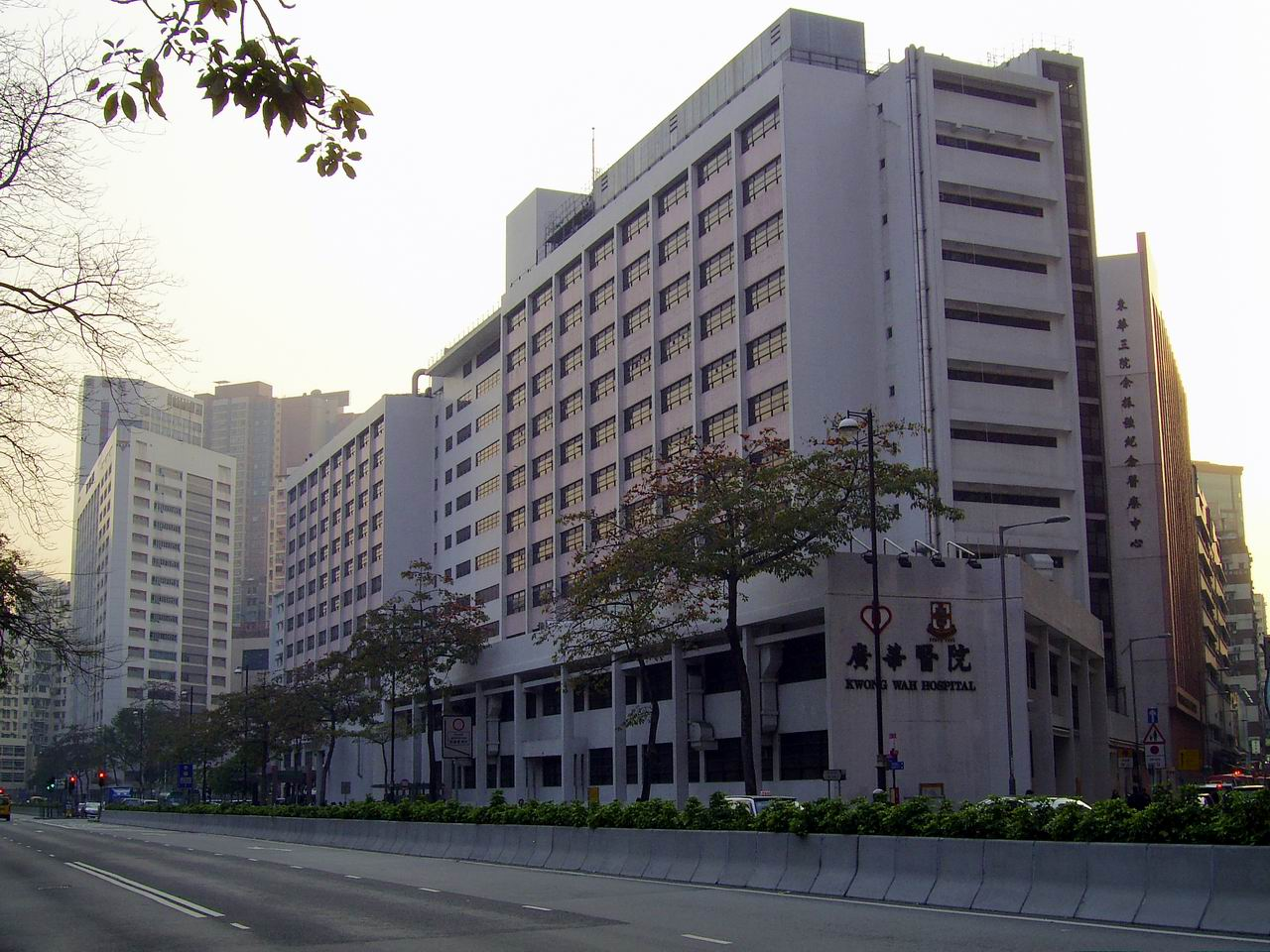
- Kwong Wah Hospital in February 2008

- Location within Hong Kong

Geography
- Location: 25 Waterloo Road, Yau Ma Tei, Kowloon, Hong Kong
- Coordinates: 22.3150°N 114.1722°E

Organisation
- Care system: Charitable
- Type: District General, Teaching
- Affiliated university: Li Ka Shing Faculty of Medicine of University of Hong Kong and CUHK Faculty of Medicine
- Network: Kowloon Central Cluster

Services
- Emergency department: Yes, Accident and Emergency
- Beds: 1,100

Helipads
- Helipad: No

History
- Founded: 9 October 1911; 114 years ago

Links
- Website: www.ha.org.hk/kwh/
- Lists: Hospitals in Hong Kong

Kwong Wah Hospital
- Traditional Chinese: 廣華醫院
- Simplified Chinese: 广华医院
Transcriptions
Standard Mandarin
- Hanyu Pinyin: Guǎnghuá Yīyuàn
Yue: Cantonese
- Yale Romanization: Gwóng wàh yī yún
- Jyutping: Gwong2 waa4 ji1 jyun6*2

Kwong Wah Hospital (Chinese: 廣華醫院; KWH) is a charitable hospital in Yau Ma Tei, Hong Kong. Located on 25 Waterloo Road, it was founded by the Tung Wah Group in 1911 and has been managed by the Hospital Authority since 1991.

The hospital is the main teaching hospital of the Kowloon Central Cluster. It has centres dedicated to neurosurgery and antenatal diagnosis. It also has clinical centers dedicated to urology, cardiology, assisted reproduction.

The former Main Hall Building of Kwong Wah Hospital is preserved and houses the Tung Wah Group of Hospitals Museum.

== History ==
Since 1898, after the lease of the New Territories and its incorporation into British Hong Kong, the Han Chinese population living in Kowloon increased rapidly. However, there were no hospitals in Kowloon or the New Territories, patients who require hospital care would have to ferry across to Hong Kong Island. Chinese philanthropists and physicians, led by Kai Ho, proposed the establishment of a charitable hospital to serve the growing Chinese population in the Kowloon area; the hospital's name (Kwong Wah, Guangdong Han Chinese) reflects its mission. The Hong Kong government eventually took up the proposal in 1907 and contributed $139,340 (equivalent to approximately $6 million HKD today) over five years, with the assistance of local charitable organizations, to finish construction of the hospital. The opening ceremony occurred in October 1911. Kwong Wah Hospital was managed by the board of directors of the Tung Wah Hospital.

At the time, much of the Chinese population was skeptical of Western medicine and some even refused Western treatment on their deathbeds; however, the repeated invasion of the bubonic plague due to globalized trade meant that the Hong Kong government and local physicians were acutely aware of the need to introduce modern Western medicine to the wider population. The Tung Wah hospitals attempted a compromise of adapting from the scientific knowledge and effective methods of Western medicine while also providing traditional Chinese medical care, often as a form of placebo. In 1922, local philanthropists donated $50,580 HKD (equivalent to approximately $2 million HKD today) to set up a specialist Chinese medicine clinic at the Kwong Wah Hospital. Integrated Chinese medical treatment continue to be available to this day.

Like its sister hospital the Tung Wah Hospital, the hospital initially relied on support from local charitable organizations, providing medicine and medical services free of charge to local residents. The hospital ran into funding shortages in its early days due to the relatively low number of wealthy citizens living in the Kowloon area, in contrast to Hong Kong Island. In 1928, local Chinese leaders convinced the Yau Ma Tei Tin Hau Temple, at the time another important local charity, to transfer its assets to the Kwong Wah Hospital. In 1931, the three hospitals managed separately by the board of the Tung Wah Hospital were reorganized into the Tung Wah Group of Hospitals. With the rapid development of Kowloon after World War II, funding from both local charities and the government has increased significantly, and the hospital has experienced over a dozen reconstruction and expansion projects, developing from a single building of 72 beds initially to its modern-day complex of seven towers with several thousand hospital beds.

The hospital played a major role in the SARS epidemic which made its way from Guangdong province to Hong Kong early in 2003. On 21 February, Liu Jianlun, a 64-year-old Chinese doctor who had treated cases of SARS in Guangdong arrived in Hong Kong to attend a wedding. He checked into the Metropole Hotel (the ninth floor - room 911). Although he had developed symptoms on 15 February, he felt well enough to travel, shop, and sight-see with his brother-in-law. On 22 February he sought urgent care at the Kwong Wah Hospital and was admitted to the intensive care unit. He died on 4 March. About 80% of the Hong Kong cases have been traced back to this doctor. On 25 February, the 53-year-old brother-in-law of the Guangdong doctor came to the Kwong Wah Hospital. He was not admitted that day but his illness worsened, and he was admitted on 1 March. He died on 19 March.

== Scope of services ==
24-Hour Accident and Emergency Service

Specialties

- Medicine and Geriatrics
- Surgery
- Neurosurgery
- Obstetrics and Gynaecology
- Paediatrics
- Orthopaedics and Traumatology
- Anaesthesia & Operating Theatre Services
- Pathology
- Diagnostic Radiology
- Liaison Psychiatry
- Ear, Nose and Throat (ENT)
- Inpatient Ophthalmology
- Inpatient Dentistry

Ambulatory and Allied Health

- General Out-Patient Service
- Specialist Out-Patient Service
- Pharmacy
- Physiotherapy
- Occupational Therapy
- Medical Social Service
- Prosthetics and Orthotics
- Dietetics
- Podiatry
- Clinical Psychology
- Speech Therapy

Community Services

- Community Nursing
- Community Geriatric Assessment Team
- Well Women Clinic
  (provided by TWGHs))
- TWGHs Integrated Diagnostic & Medical Centre
  (provided by TWGHs)
- Chinese Medicine Clinics
  (provided by TWGHs)

Others

- Central Sterile Supplies Department
- Electrodiagnostic Unit
- Endoscopy Unit
- Day Surgery
- Prenatal Diagnostic Centre
- Intensive Care Unit (ICU)
- Neurosurgical High Dependency Unit
- Geriatric Day Hospital
- Renal Dialysis Service

== Integrative Chinese and Western Medicine ==
Kwong Wah Hospital is also provides integrative traditional Chinese medicine (TCM) and Western Medicine. TWGHs Wilson T S Wang Integrated Chinese and Western Medicine Treatment Centre was established by the TWGHs in Kwong Wah Hospital . Through joint consultation for designated diseases under protocols which developed by both Chinese Medicine and Western Medicine practitioners.

== Notable people ==
- Ma Ying-jeou, the former President of the Republic of China, was born in this hospital in 1950. This information is displayed in the Museum of the Hospital.
- Sita Chan, singer who died in a car accident.

== Transportation ==
MTR Kwun Tong line and Tsuen Wan line Yau Ma Tei station Exit A2.
