= Sandy Bay, Hong Kong =

Bay in Hong Kong

Coordinates: 22°16′N 114°07′E

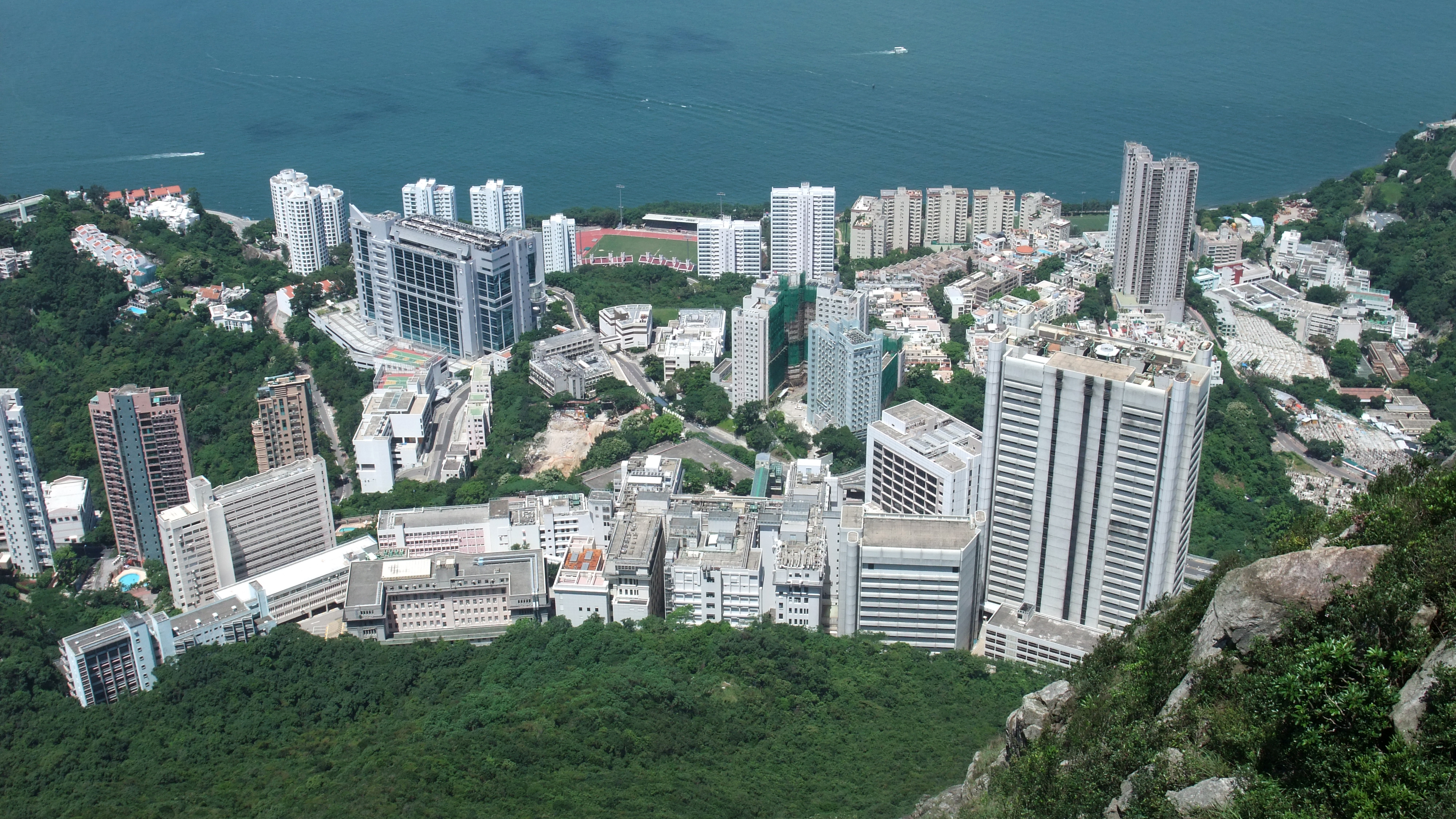
- Sandy Bay, viewed from High West.
- Traditional Chinese: 沙灣
- Simplified Chinese: 沙湾
Transcriptions
Standard Mandarin
- Hanyu Pinyin: Shāwān
Yue: Cantonese
- Jyutping: saa1 waan1

Alternative Chinese name
- Traditional Chinese: 大口環
- Simplified Chinese: 大口环
Transcriptions
Standard Mandarin
- Hanyu Pinyin: Dàkǒuhuán
Yue: Cantonese
- Jyutping: daai6 hau2 waan4

Sandy Bay (Chinese: 沙灣; also known as 大口環) is a bay which is a part of Pok Fu Lam, located at the south of Mount Davis, Hong Kong Island, Hong Kong.

The developed area at Sandy Bay is home to numerous facilities including Kennedy School, West Island School, the University of Hong Kong Stanley Ho Sports Centre, numerous hospitals and rehabilitation homes such as Queen Mary Hospital, the Duchess of Kent Children's Hospital, and MacLehose Medical Rehabilitation Centre. The Chinese Christian Cemetery was established in 1909 and is one of Hong Kong's largest columbaria. The University of Hong Kong Stanley Ho Sports Centre at the bottom of the bay is available for students, local school access, and the public via membership. It hosts a track and an olympic-sized pool which local schools can book for use. There is a long jump pit, high jump set up, hurdles and other track and field set ups available at the area. It is opposite Kennedy School.

Minibus routes 10, 10P, 58, 58A, 58M, 59, and resident bus HR88 (to Central only after morning) serve the area on Sandy Bay Road and Sha Wan Drive. Citybus route 43M and 47P (peak hours only) and NWFB route 971 stop at Victoria Road.
