= Queen Elizabeth Hospital, Hong Kong =

Hospital in Kowloon, Hong Kong

Queen Elizabeth Hospital
- Hospital Authority

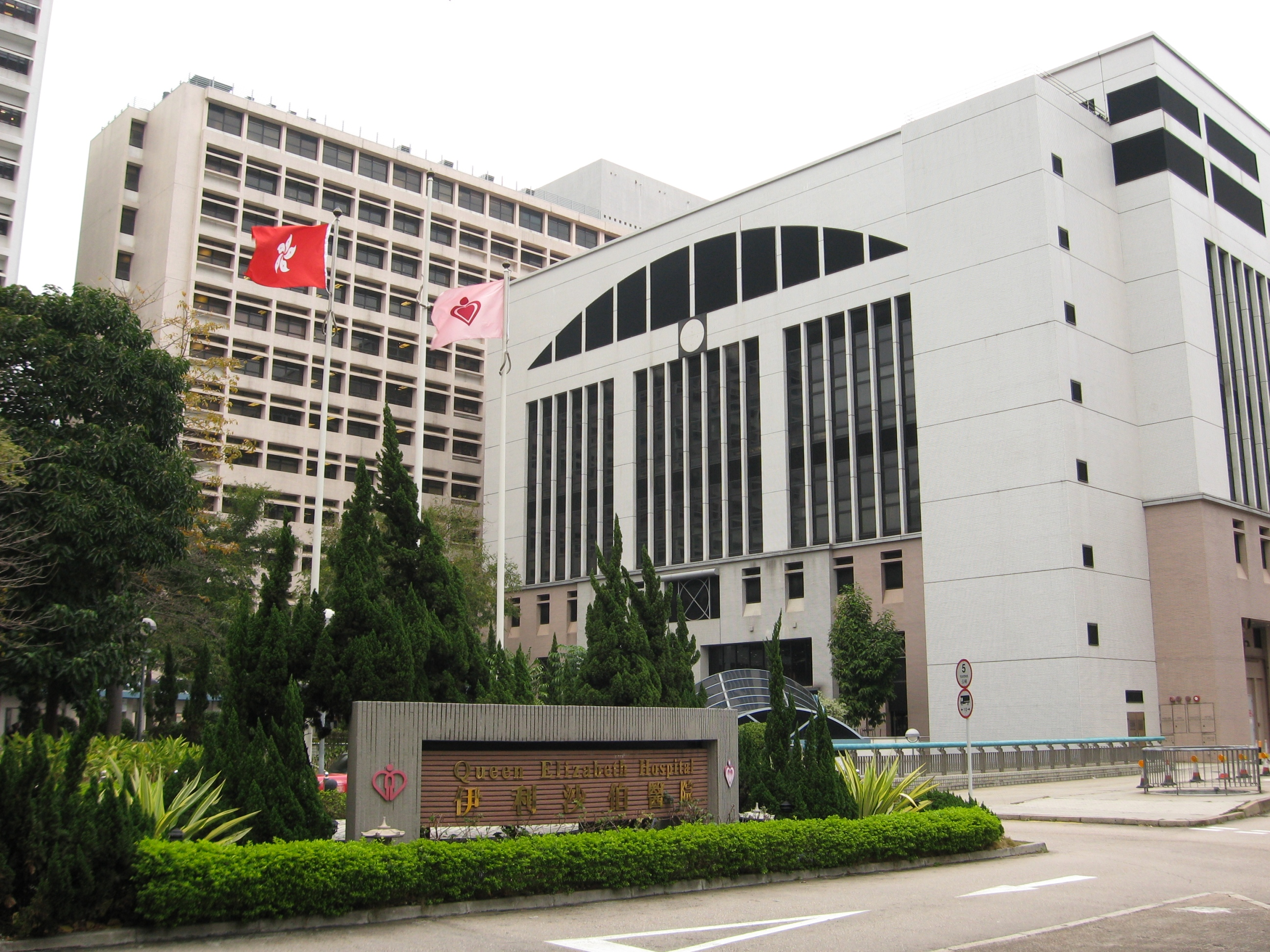
- Queen Elizabeth Hospital in February 2008

- Location within Hong Kong

Geography
- Location: 30 Gascoigne Road, King's Park, Kowloon, Hong Kong
- Coordinates: 22°18′34″N 114°10′32″E

Organisation
- Care system: Public
- Type: District General, Teaching
- Affiliated university: Queen Elizabeth Hospital General Nursing School, University of Hong Kong and CUHK Faculty of Medicine
- Network: Kowloon Central Cluster

Services
- Emergency department: Yes, accident and emergency and trauma centre
- Beds: 1,906

Helipads
- Helipad: No

History
- Founded: 6 September 1963; 62 years ago

Links
- Website: www.ha.org.hk/qeh/
- Lists: Hospitals in Hong Kong

Queen Elizabeth Hospital, Hong Kong
- Traditional Chinese: 伊利沙伯醫院
- Simplified Chinese: 伊利沙伯医院
- Literal meaning: Elizabeth Hospital
Transcriptions
Standard Mandarin
- Hanyu Pinyin: Yīlìshābǎi Yīyuàn
Yue: Cantonese
- Yale Romanization: Yīleihsābaak Yīyún
- Jyutping: ji1 lei6 saa1 baak3 ji1 jyun6*2

Queen Elizabeth Hospital (Chinese: 伊利沙伯醫院; Cantonese Yale: Yīleihsābaak Yīyún; QEH, sometimes QE) is one of the largest district general hospitals in Hong Kong. It was named after the late Queen Elizabeth II. Queen Elizabeth Hospital is a major tertiary hospital in southern Kowloon, with over 1,900 beds. It employs more than 500 physicians and surgeons.

The hospital was once the largest in the Commonwealth.

== Description ==
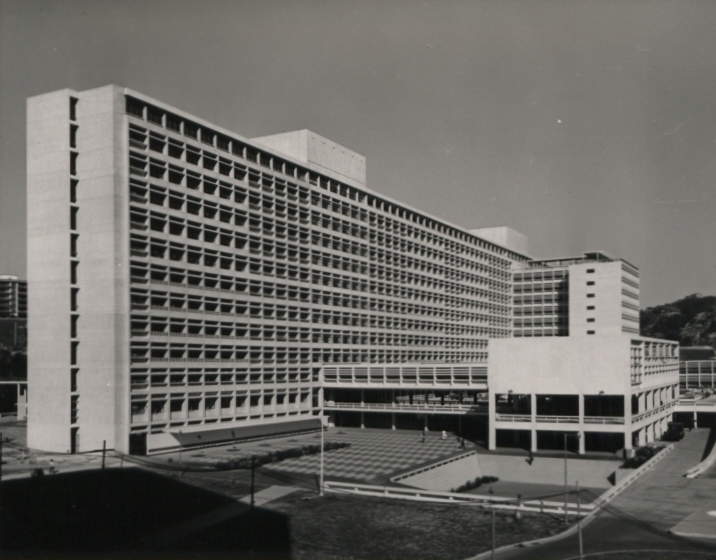
Queen Elizabeth Hospital in 1969

Queen Elizabeth Hospital was officially opened on 6 September 1963 by then Governor of Hong Kong, Robert Black. At the time, it was the largest general hospital in the British Commonwealth, built at a cost of HK$70,300,000. Prince Philip, Duke of Edinburgh laid the hospital's foundation stone on 7 March 1959.

The hospital is now the largest public hospital in Kowloon. It has 1,906 beds and 13 clinical departments, and a staff force of about 6,850. It serves an effective population of about 900,000 and about one-third of all cancer patients in Hong Kong. It is the largest acute hospital in Hong Kong despite not being a teaching hospital.

The hospital has a full complement of services including 24-hour Accident and Emergency and specialist services. Clinics are located at three different sites to serve the district. They are the Queen Elizabeth Hospital Specialist Clinic, Yau Ma Tei Polyclinic, and the 'L' Block Clinic.

The hospital provides high-intensity care for all clinical specialties, and a tertiary referral center for major specialties. It is also a teaching center for basic and post-graduate training of doctors, nurses and allied health professionals.

Through its cluster network, the hospital is closely linked with Kwong Wah Hospital and the United Christian Hospital for acute services, as well as Kowloon Hospital and Hong Kong Buddhist Hospital for convalescent rehabilitation and hospice services. Other general and specialty services are supported by Wong Tai Sin Hospital, the East Kowloon Clinic and Pamela Youde Clinic.

To enhance community participation, an annual health promotion programme and a patient resource centre were established in 1993, giving support to seven self-help patient groups. The hospital organised a Healthwork Campaign for the staffs of 28 hotels in Yau Tsim Mong District and formed partnership programmes with the Hong Kong Hotels Association in 1995–96.

In 1994–96, the hospital completed some major service expansion projects. They included the provision of an Open Heart and Thoracic Surgical Services and an Adolescent Medical Centre.

A 24-hour multidisciplinary trauma service was introduced in 1995–96, and various patient-centred services re-organisations were introduced. The medical record system and electronic medical record systems were also introduced in phases beginning in 1994.

The hospital pioneered a two-year training post of Family Physicians in QEH in July 1996 to promote high quality health care practitioners and expanded the initiative into a wider programme with corporate support in 1997. It is now an established mandate for HA.

To meet growing demand for its services, a number of renovation and reconstruction projects were carried out. These include air conditioning for all hospital wards by the end of 1996. With a donation from the Hong Kong Jockey Club, the Jockey Club Institute of Radiotherapy and Oncology, and the Jockey Club Institute of Radiology and Imaging were redeveloped. Redevelopment of the Ambulatory Care Centre, with specialist clinics, day surgery and rehabilitation services included under one roof, was completed by 1997. The new Rehabilitation Block opened for service in 1999, and a new surgical centre with 21 operating theatres opened in 2000.

== Scope of service ==
Specialties:

- Accident and emergency department
- Trauma centre
- Anaesthesiology and Operating theatre services
- Neurosurgery
- Neurology
- Clinical oncology
- Cardiology
- Gastroenterology and hepatology
- Thoracic surgery
- Renal medicine and urology
- Surgery/medicine
- Paediatrics and neonatology
- Obstetrics and gynaecology
- Ear, nose, and throat
- Sports medicine
- Ophthalmology
- Intensive care unit
- Oral-maxillofacial surgery and dental unit
- Reconstructive orthopaedics
- Nursing
- Home care services

Others:

- Radiology and imaging
- Pathology
- Paramedical service
- Rehabilitation
- AIDS service
- Adolescent medical centre
