= Charitable hospital =

Type of non-profit hospital

A charitable hospital, or charity hospital, is a non-profit hospital that provides treatment for poor and uninsured people who cannot purchase treatment. An example would be St. Jude Children's Hospital that provides assistance to children and funds research for pediatric ailments. Charitable hospitals are usually tax exempt in the United States and are usually funded through donations and special contributions from partnering affiliates.
