= United Christian Hospital =

- Hospital Authority and the Hong Kong Christian Council

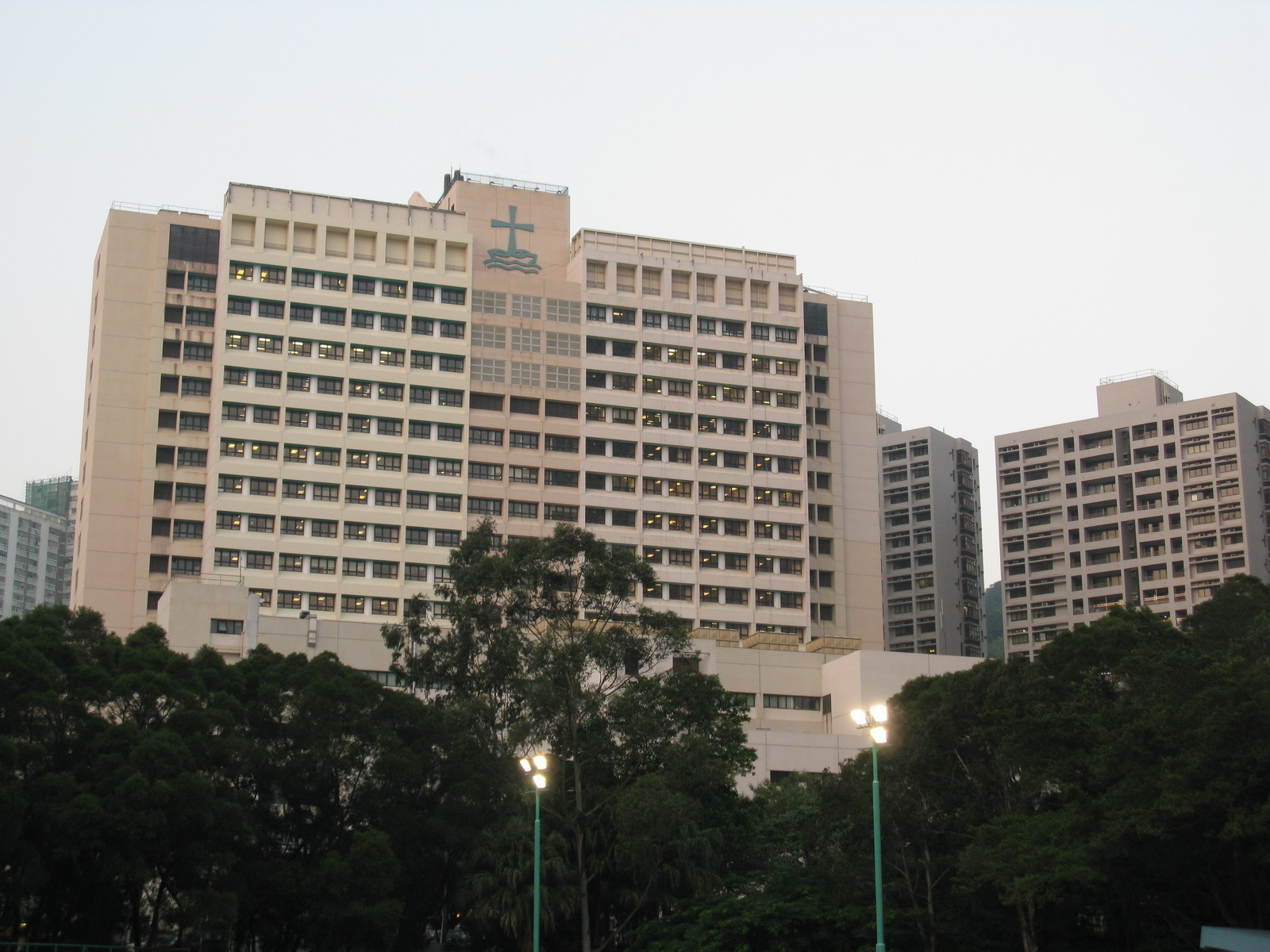
- United Christian Hospital in November 2007

- Location within Hong Kong

Geography
- Location: 130 Hip Wo Street, Kwun Tong, Kowloon, Hong Kong
- Coordinates: 22°19′23″N 114°13′37″E

Organisation
- Care system: Public
- Type: District General, Teaching
- Religious affiliation: Christian
- Affiliated university: Medical Faculty of the Chinese University of Hong Kong
- Patron: Dr Edward H. Paterson
- Network: Kowloon East Cluster

Services
- Emergency department: Yes, 24 hour Accident and Emergency
- Beds: 1600

Helipads
- Helipad: No

History
- Founded: 6 December 1973; 52 years ago

Links
- Website: www.uch.org.hk
- Lists: Hospitals in Hong Kong

United Christian Hospital
- Traditional Chinese: 基督教聯合醫院
- Simplified Chinese: 基督教联合医院
Transcriptions
Standard Mandarin
- Hanyu Pinyin: Jīdūjiào Liánhé Yīyuàn
Yue: Cantonese
- Yale Romanization: Gēidūkgaau Lyùhnhahp Yīyún
- Jyutping: gei1 duk1 gaau3 lyun4 hap6 ji1 jyun6*2

United Christian Hospital (Chinese: 基督教聯合醫院; UCH) is a Christian-founded district general hospital in Kwun Tong of New Kowloon in Hong Kong, operated by the Hospital Authority. The hospital has 1,600 beds and 3,000 staff, serving eastern Kowloon.

United Christian Hospital was founded in 1973 by the Alice Ho Miu Ling Nethersole Hospital and Hong Kong Christian Council. The hospital first chief of medical superintendent was Dr. Edward Hamilton Paterson.

== History ==
United Christian Hospital was planned as a 350-bed voluntary hospital by the ''Special Committee on the United Protestant Hospital'' of the Hong Kong Christian Council and Alice Ho Miu Ling Nethersole Foundation in 1968. It had its foundation stone laid on 2 April 1971 by the Governor of Hong Kong, David Trench, and was officially opened on 6 December 1973 by Murray MacLehose, Trench's successor as Governor of Hong Kong.

United Christian Hospital was expanded in the 1990s. At that time, Blocks J, K, L and S were built, and Block P was redeveloped. The project was completed in 1999.

== Services ==
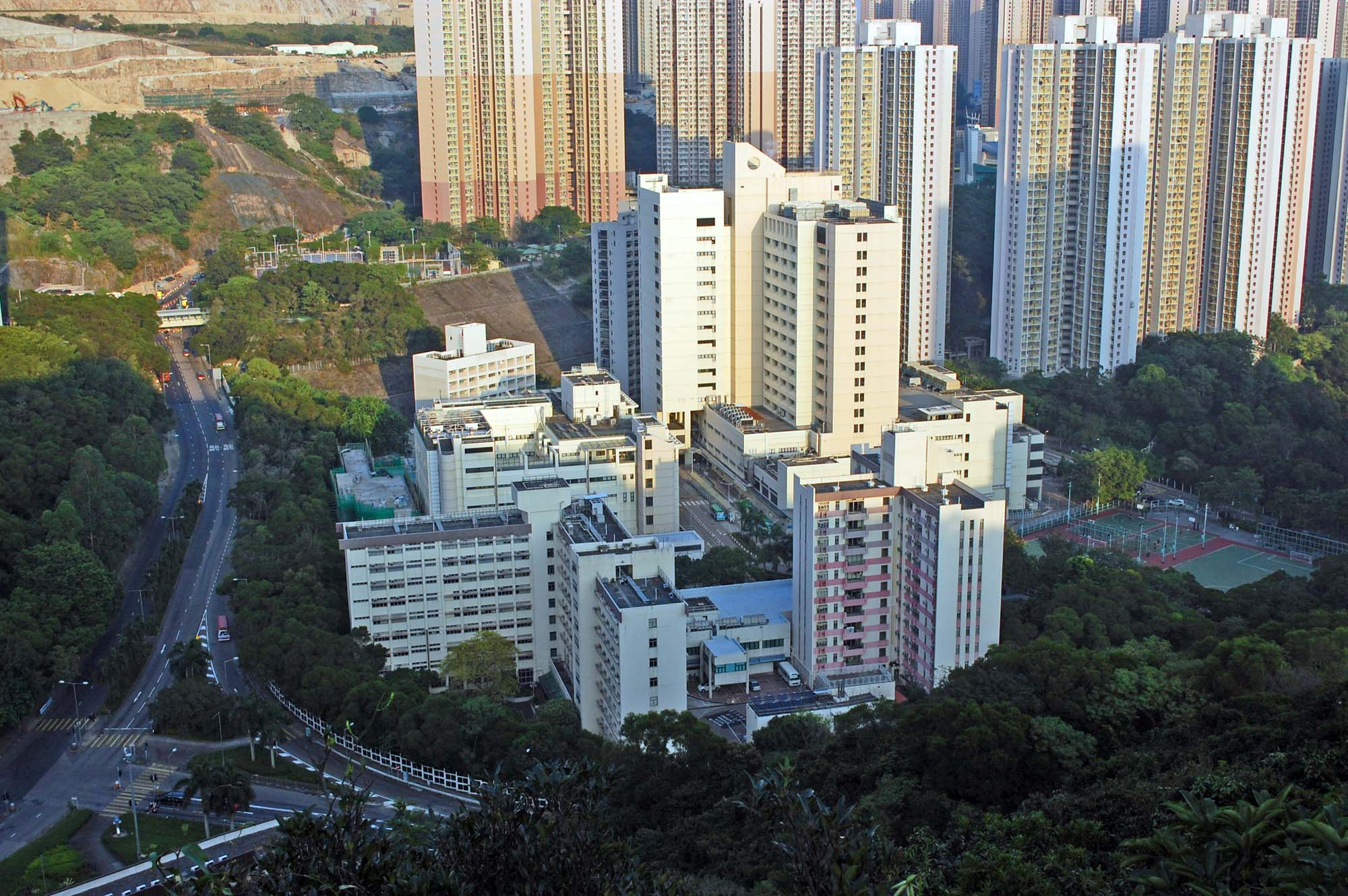
Overview of the hospital prior to redevelopment in September 2014

- 24-hour Emergency Department
- Medicine & Geriatrics
- General Surgery
- Obstetrics and Gynaecology
- Paediatrics
- Orthopaedic and Traumatic Surgery
- Psychiatry
- Intensive Care
- Anaesthesia
- Diagnostic Radiology
- Pathology
- Ear-Nose-Throat
- Ophthalmology
- Neurosurgery
- Dentistry & Maxillofacial Surgery

The hospital provides in-patient, day-patient and out-patient care; it also manages the psychiatry, physiotherapy, occupational therapy and geriatric day hospital services of Yung Fung Shee Memorial Centre as well as the Eye Clinic, pharmacy and radiology services of the Pamela Youde Polyclinic at Cha Kwo Ling Road.

The hospital provides Community Nursing Services (CNS) to patients in Kwun Tong.

== Redevelopment and expansion ==
The hospital is currently undergoing a major expansion and redevelopment project. This involves the demolition of Blocks F, G, and H, as well as the low block of Block P. A major new ambulatory block (Block A) will be built, a new Oncology Centre will be provided, and various other expansions and renovations will be completed. The project is set to be completed in 2023.

At the end of January 2018, Secretary for Food and Health Professor Sophia Chan Siu-chee expressed her concern over the chronic shortage of nurses across hospitals in Hong Kong. Among hospitals being affected, United Christian Hospital was cited as the worst-hit public medical service provider. Statistics showed its bed occupancy rate reached a peak of 120%, a rate of usage well above its maximum capacity. From a wider perspective of the problem across other hospitals in Hong Kong, the situation of recruitment of medical staff was not any better. A shortage of labour has long been an issue in public hospitals. In 2017, of the 2,000 vacancies available, only 80% were filled, amounting to about 1,800 new nurses being hired by the public hospital. Adding to the problem was the incoming flu season during the winter, which placed more pressure on medical staff across hospitals in Hong Kong due to the added workloads.

== See also ==
- List of hospitals in Hong Kong
