= Christianity in Hong Kong =

Christianity has been in Hong Kong since 1841 when British Empire started to rule Hong Kong.

As of 2022, there were about 1.3 million Christians in Hong Kong (16% of the total population), most of them are Protestant (around 900,000) and Catholic (around 401,000).

== Roman Catholic Church ==
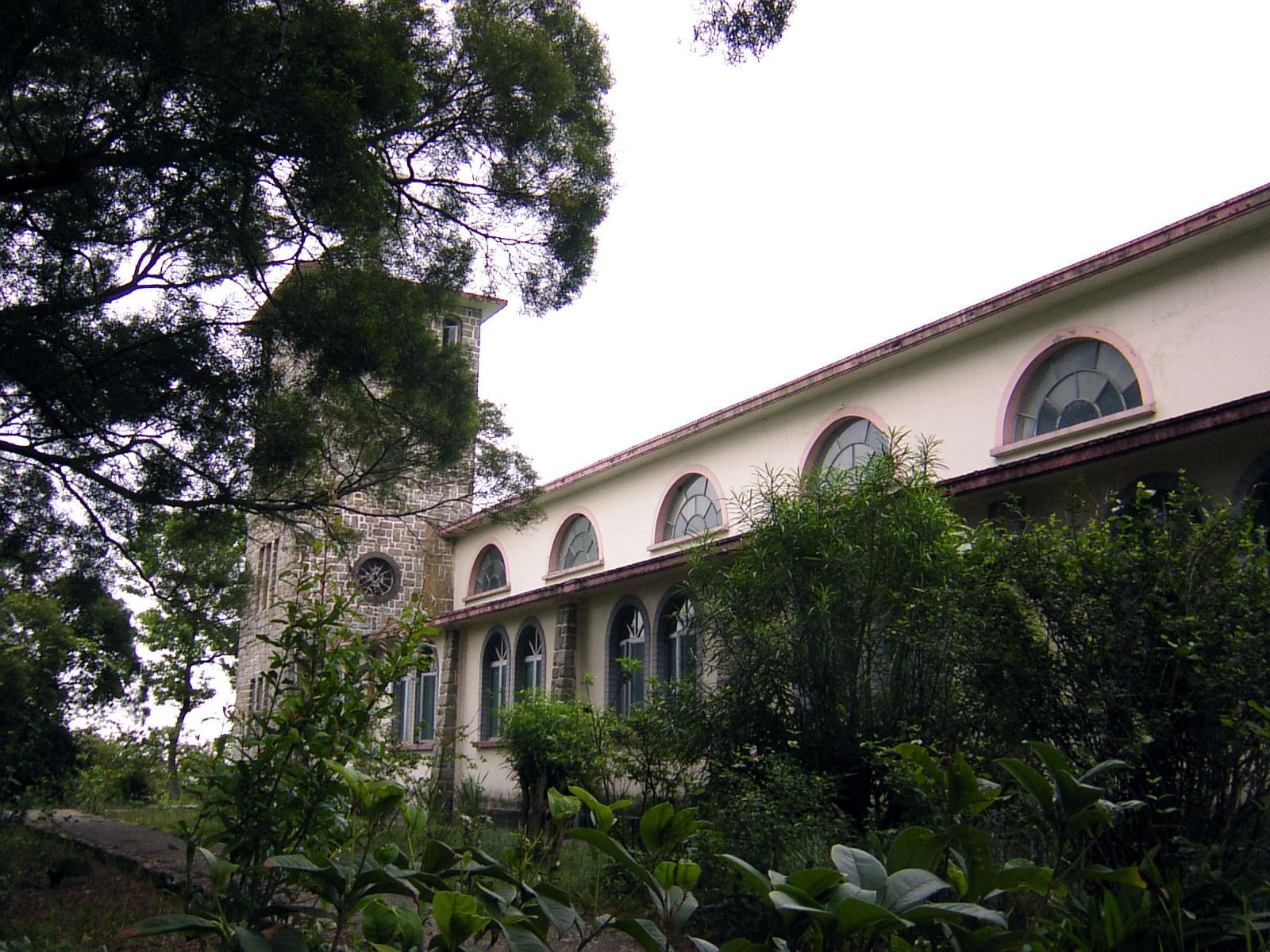
Trappist Haven Monastery

The Roman Catholic Church in Hong Kong was established as a Mission Prefecture in 1841 and as an Apostolic Vicariate in 1874. It became a diocese in 1946.

About 403,000 Hongkongers are Catholics. They are served by 285 priests, 68 brothers and 541 sisters. There are 52 parishes, comprising 40 churches, 30 chapels and 27 halls for religious service. Services are conducted in Cantonese, with three-fifths of the parishes providing services in English and in Tagalog in some cases.

The diocese has established its own administrative structure while maintaining close links with the Pope and other Catholic communities around the world. It has the same creed, Scripture, liturgy and organisation as the other culture communities worldwide. The assistant secretary-general of the Federation of Asian Bishops' Conference has his office in Hong Kong.

Along with its apostolic work, one of the prime concerns of the diocese has been for the well-being of all the Hongkongers. To reach people through the media, the diocese publishes two weekly newspapers, Kung Kao Po and Sunday Examiner. In addition, the Diocesan Audio-Visual Centre produces tapes and films for use in schools and parishes and, overall, the Hong Kong Catholic Social Communications Office acts as an information and public relations channel for the diocese.

== Protestantism ==
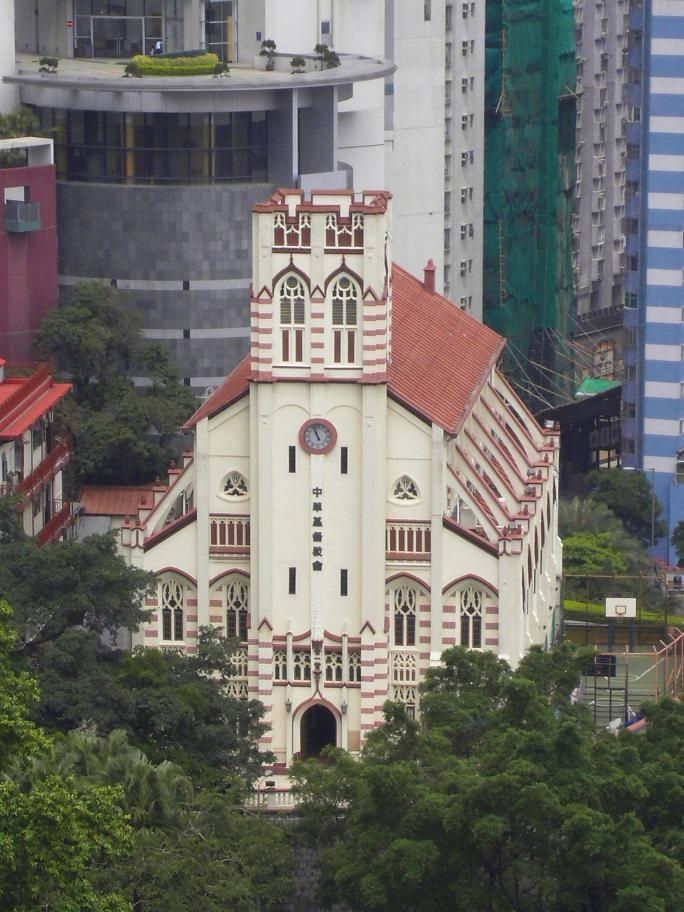
A chapel of the Church of Christ in China in Bonham Road.

The Protestant churches in Hong Kong have about 800,000 registered members.

The presence of the Protestant community dates back to 1841. "Great Light Newspaper" (大光報), a Christian newspaper based in Hong Kong and distributed in Hong Kong and China, was in operation in the early 1900s, with Dr. Man-Kai Wan, 尹文階 (1869–1927) as its chairman of the board and Dr. Sun Yat-sen (a secondary school classmate of Dr. Wan) as its contributor.

To Tsai Church (道濟會堂), founded by the London Missionary Society in 1888 and located at 75 Hollywood Road, Mid-levels (半山區), Hong Kong, was Sun's place of worship while he studied medicine in the Hong Kong College of Medicine for Chinese (香港華人西醫書院). According to Wong Man-kong, To Tsai Church was one of the first independent churches in China. Fung-Chi Au (區鳳墀, 1847-1914), who was Sun's teacher of Chinese literature, was an Elder of To Tsai Church. Due to its growth, this church erected a large building in 1926 and was renamed Hop Yat Church (合一堂).

In 1851, Methodist missionaries arrived in Hong Kong from England. The Chinese Methodist Church (循道衛理聯合教會) started a formal church establishment in 1882 in Wellington Street, Hong Kong. Separately, in 1893 the English Methodist Church was founded. Upon expansion, the Chinese Methodist Church moved to Aberdeen Street and then Caine Road. In 1936, it moved to a new building at 36 Hennessy Road, Hong Kong. In 1998, this building was replaced by a 23-story building. In addition, the church started numerous branch churches and schools all over Hong Kong.The British-affiliated Chinese Methodist Church and the American-affiliated Methodist Church united in 1975 to form The Methodist Church, Hong Kong, while the English Methodist Church joined in 1988.

About 800,000 Protestant Christians live in Hong Kong. The Protestant Church is made up of over 1,300 congregations in more than 50 denominations. Major denominations are Anglicans, Baptists, Lutherans, Adventists, Christian and Missionary Alliance, Church of Christ in China, Methodist, Pentecostal and Salvation Army. With their emphasis on youth work, many congregations have a high proportion of young people.

Two weekly newspapers are published, the Christian Weekly and the Christian Times. Two ecumenical bodies facilitate co-operative work among the Protestant churches in Hong Kong. The older one, dating from 1915, is the Hong Kong Chinese Christian Churches Union. The second co-operative body is the Hong Kong Christian Council, formed in 1954. Major mainline denominations and ecumenical services constitute the membership core of the council, which is committed to building closer relationships among all churches in Hong Kong as well as with churches overseas, and to stimulating local Christians to play an active part in the development of Hong Kong society. The chairman of the council, the Rt Revd Thomas Soo, represents the Protestant community in the six religions' meetings.

=== Gallery ===
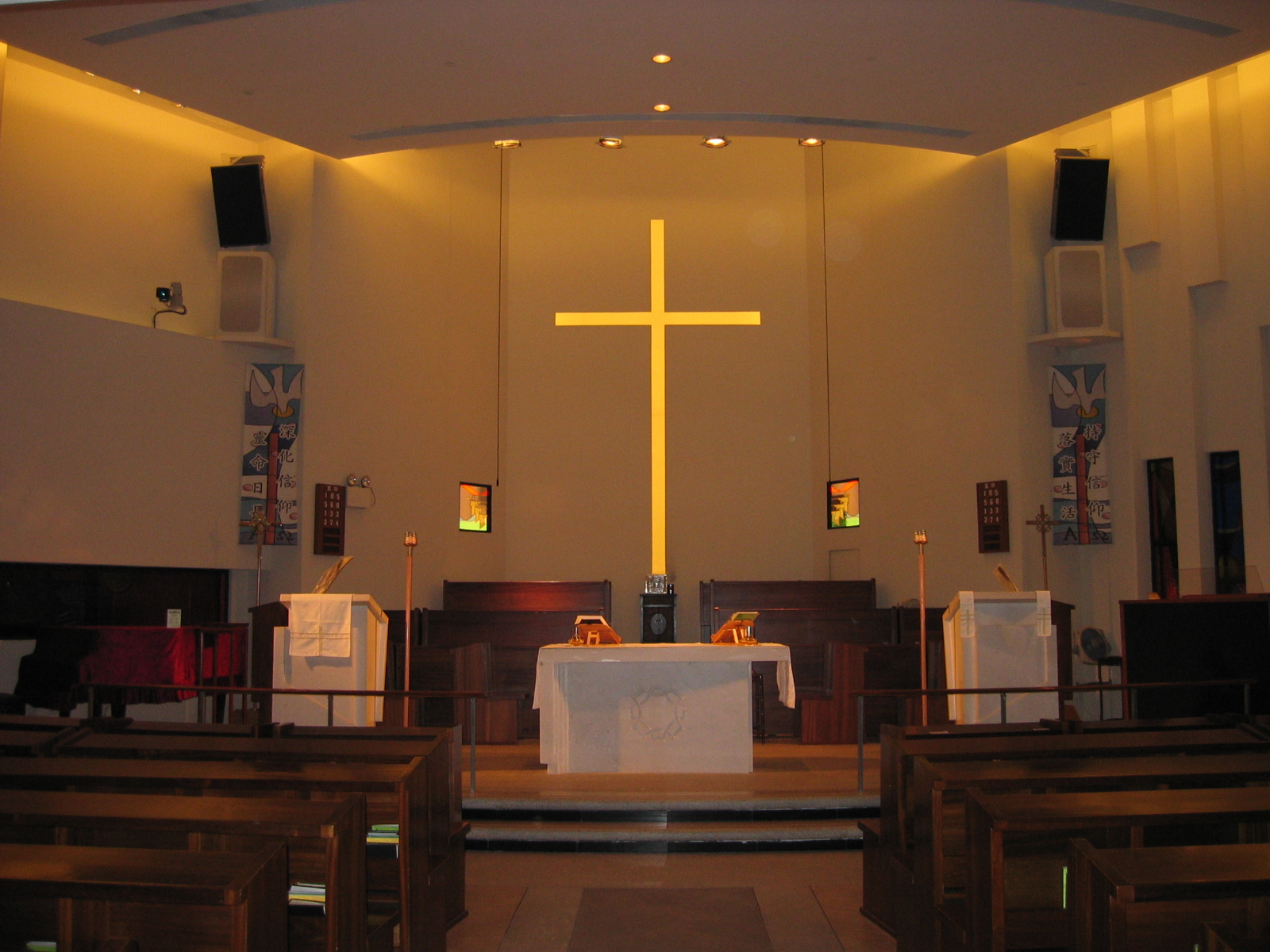
Crown of Thorns' Church

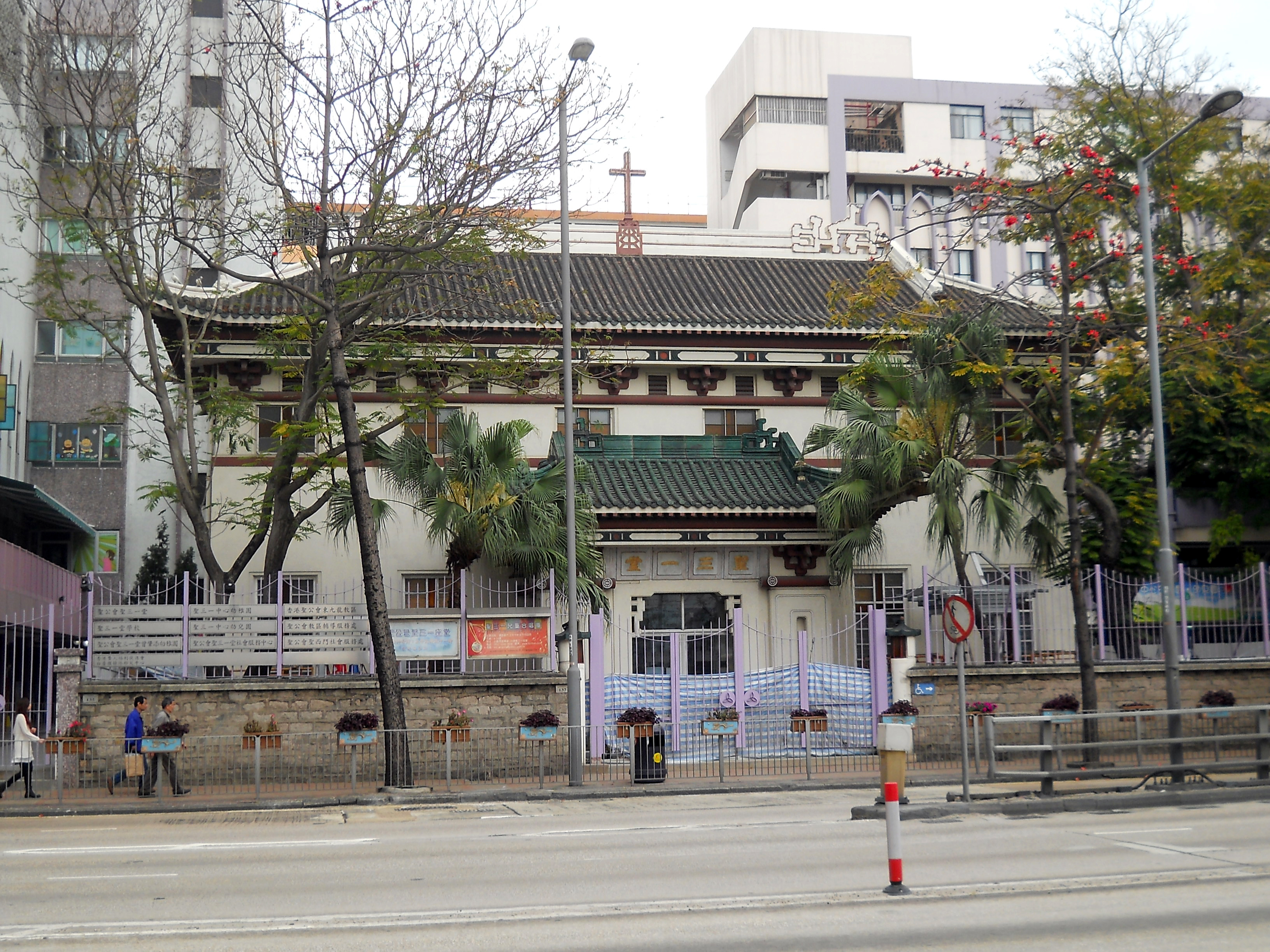
Holy Trinity Cathedral, Kowloon City

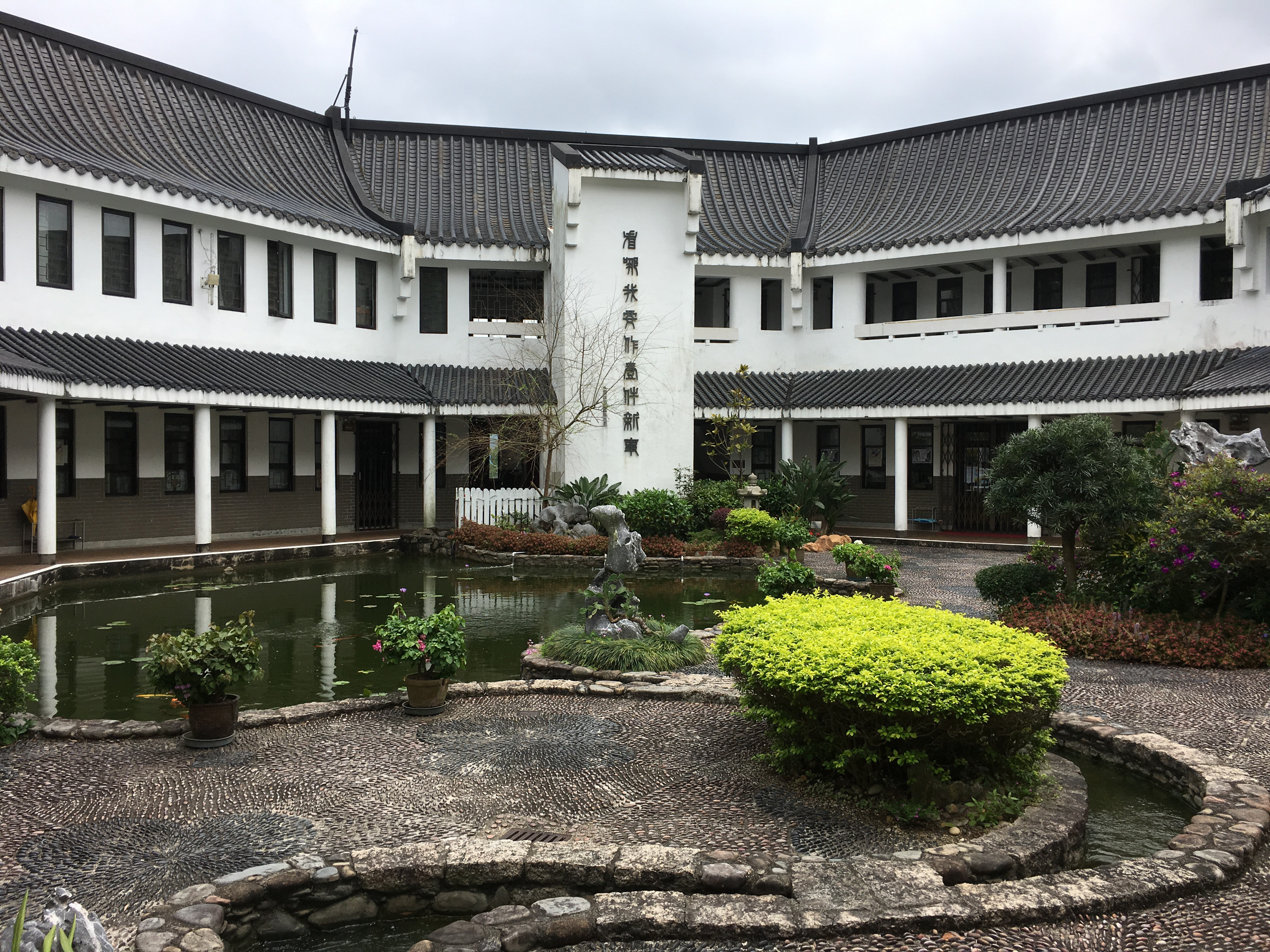
Chinese architecture in the Lutheran Theological Seminary (Hong Kong)

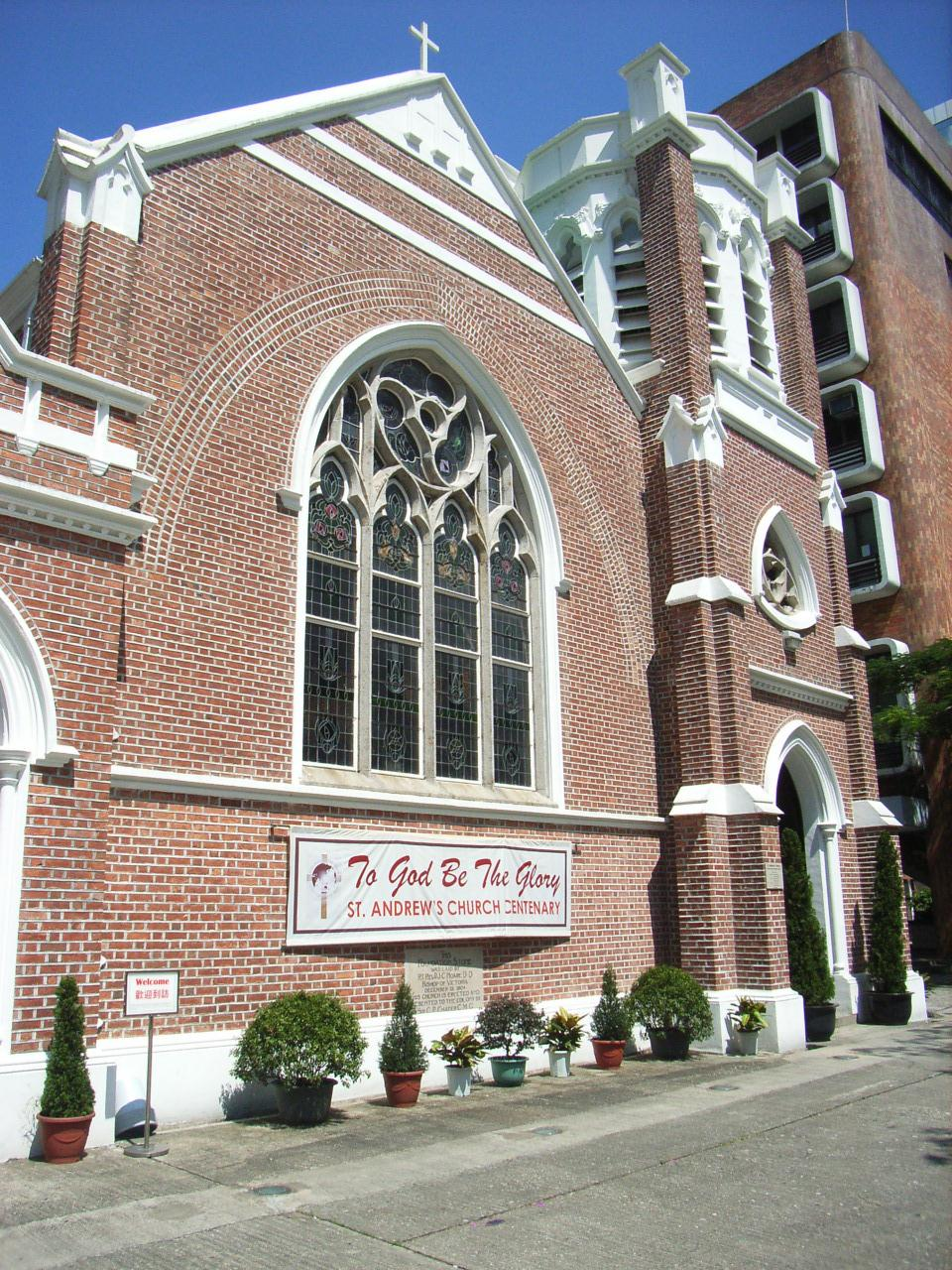
St. Andrew's Church (Kowloon)

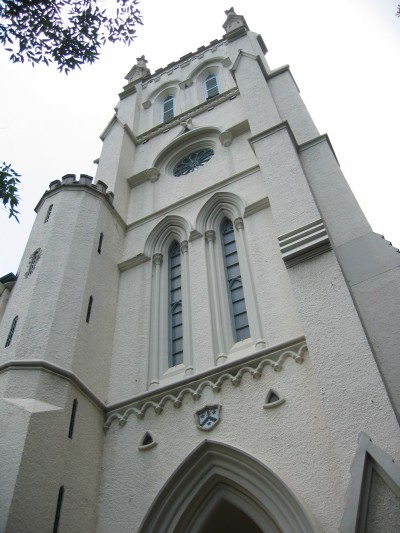
St. John's Cathedral, Hong Kong

== Eastern Orthodox Church ==
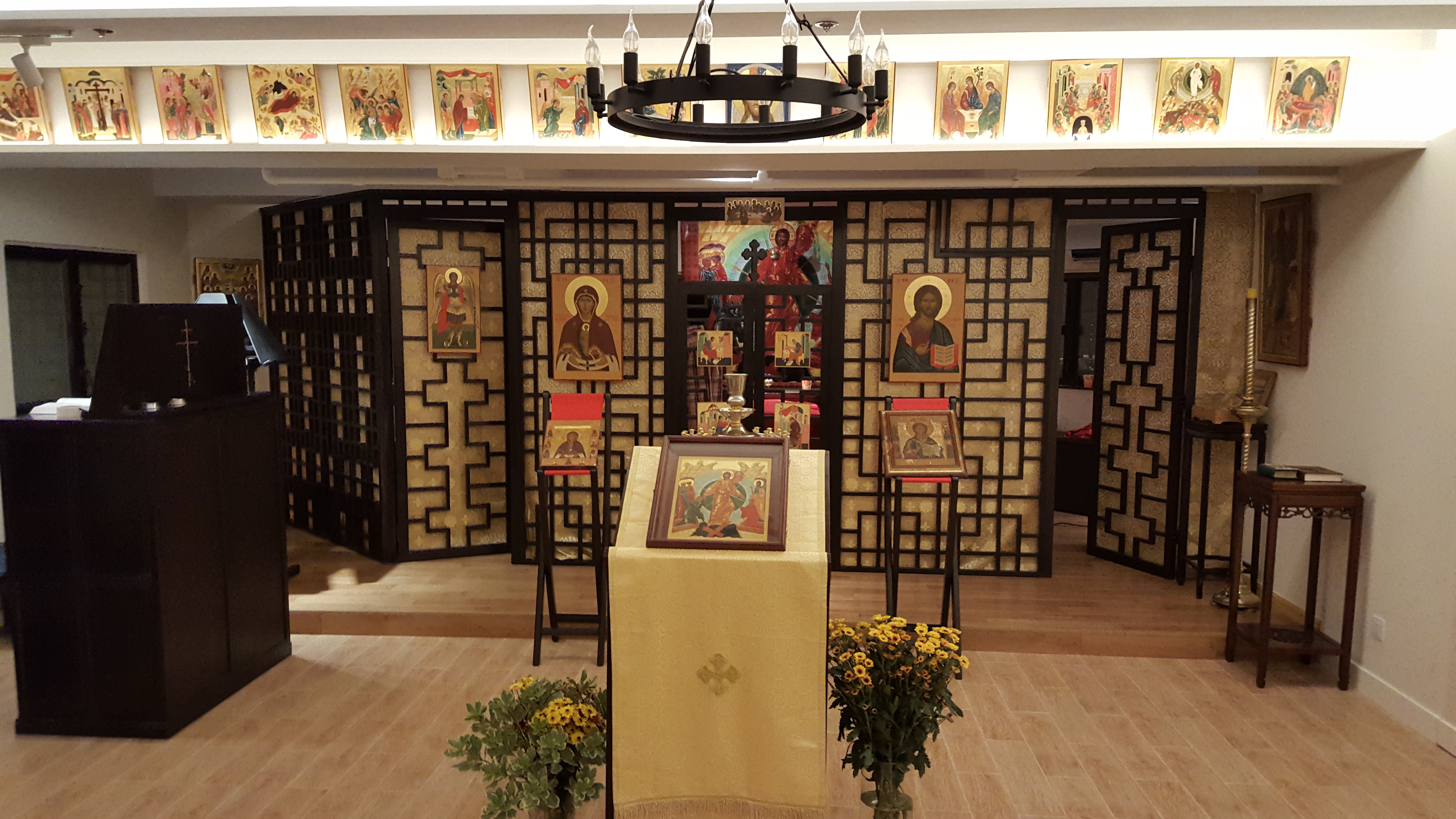
Russian Orthodox Church of Saint Apostles Peter and Paul in Hong Kong

In 1933, the head of the Russian Orthodox Mission in China, Bishop Victor (Svyatin) sent Priest Dmitry Uspensky, who served in Beijing, to Hong Kong, where many Eastern Orthodox emigrants from Russia moved since the Revolution in 1917. He organised a parish in Hong Kong and served there until his death in 1969. In 1945, the parish was visited by Russian Orthodox Bishop John (Maximovich) of Shanghai, and in 1968 by Russian Orthodox Bishop Juvenaly (Poyarkov) of Zaraisk. The parish was officially reestablished in 2008.

In November 1996, Orthodox Metropolitanate of Hong Kong and Southeast Asia (Chinese: 正教會普世宗主教聖統香港及東南亞都主教教區) was set up by the decision of the Holy Great Synod of the Ecumenical Patriarchate of Constantinople.

== Mormonism (LDS Church) ==
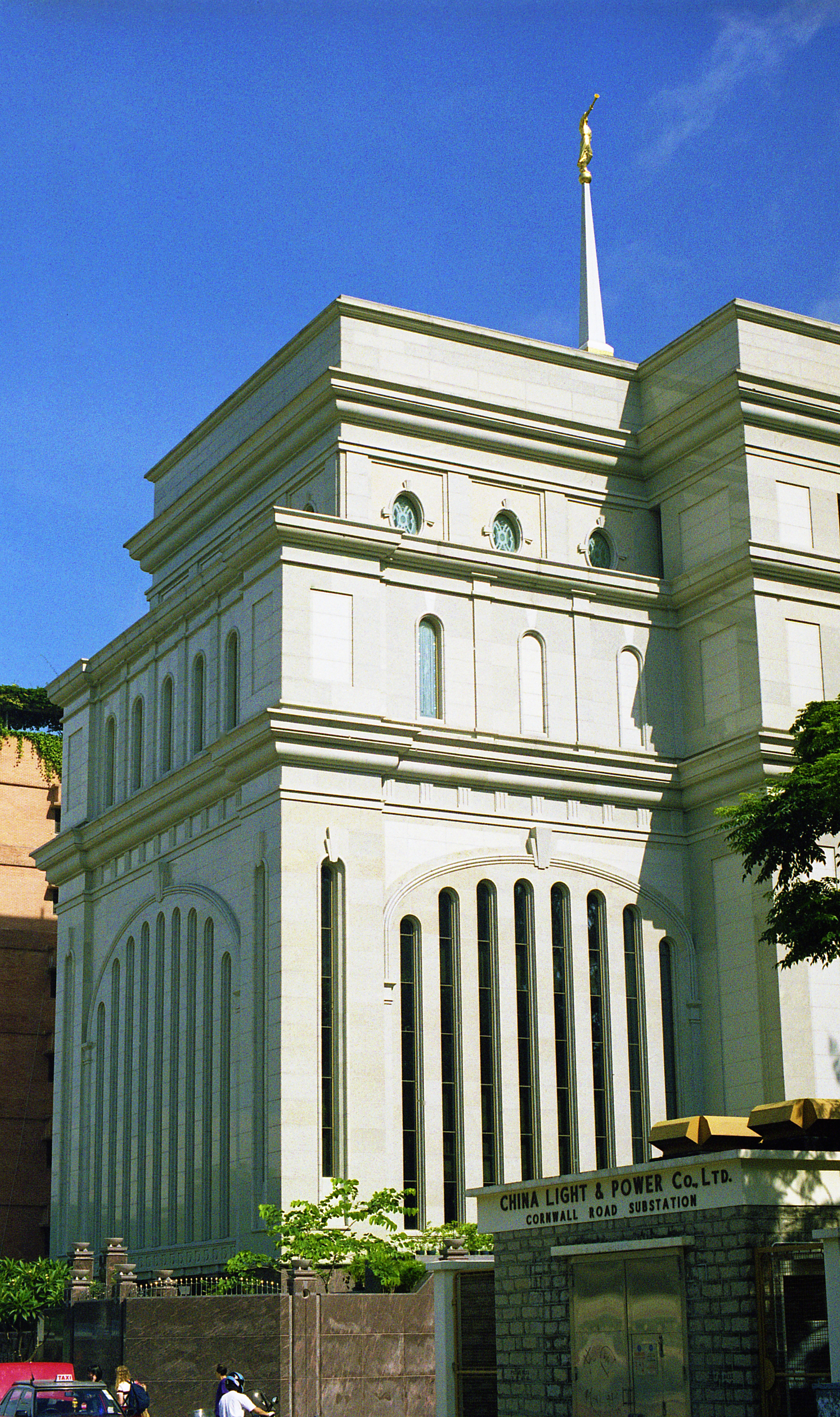
Hong Kong China Temple

The Church of Jesus Christ of Latter-day Saints has more than 23,000 practitioners in Hong Kong divided into 36 congregations, doubling the number of members from 10 years earlier. The LDS Church first sent missionaries to Hong Kong in 1853 but did not establish a headquarters until 1949. In 1996 the Church completed the Hong Kong China Temple in Kowloon. In 2005, the Church dedicated the Church Administration Building Hong Kong on Gloucester Road in Wan Chai.

The geographical administrative area for the China Hong Kong Mission includes all of China. There are missionaries in Macau but as of 2007, there are no LDS Missionaries preaching within mainland China, although there are some service Missionaries.

== Jehovah's Witnesses ==
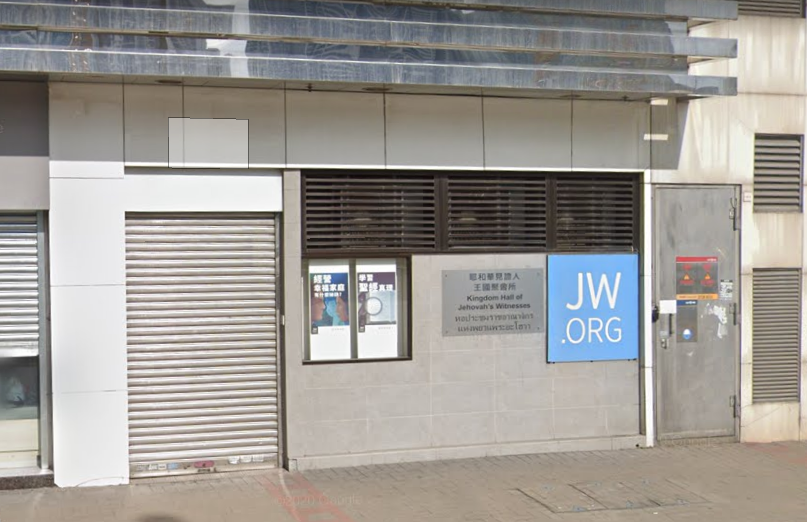
Kingdom Hall of Jehovah's witnesses located in Kowloon district, Hong Kong

Jehovah's Witnesses have been present in the territory since the 20th century, By early 1976, Jehovah’s Witnesses in Hong Kong numbered more than 500, associated with seven congregations. The growth of the movement by the 1990's it was estimated there were 2,320 publishers in 23 congregation in Hong Kong.

In 2020, the number of Jehovah's Witnesses was 5,594 active publishers, united in 66 congregations; 9,219 people attended annual celebration of Lord's Evening Meal in 2020. Their religious meetings are held in 6 different languages, this being Cantonese, Mandarin Chinese, Tagalog, Iloko, Indonesian and English

== Welfare and social services ==
In 1955, the Catholic Diocesan started to provide different kind of social welfare to Hong Kong. For example, hospitals and clinics, creches, homes for the aged and blind girls. Starting from 1960s, the Catholics tried to provide services in more areas such as orphanages, noodle units, bakeries, milk conversion units, women rehabilitation institutes and vocational & trade training courses. In the 1970s, the Catholic Diocesan started to focus on specific areas and terminated some of the factory units. In 2018, the Catholics were still providing services in medical aspect, nurseries & child care centers, elderly & youth services and Caritas social family services center. In the Catholic community, Caritas is the official social welfare arm of the Church in Hong Kong. These services are open to all people. Indeed, 95 per cent of those who have benefited from the wide range of services provided by the diocese are not Catholics. "The Catholic French Sisters of St. Paul de Chartres" was one of the first orphanage and elderly homes, established in 1848.

In protestant communities, Hong Kong Sheng Kung Hui has been responsive to social needs, by providing a wide array of social services, aiming at achieving a fair, just and loving society. At present, many social service organisations and social service models in Hong Kong were those initiated and promoted by the Church. Services provided by the Church are multi-faceted, including services for family and child-care, children and youth, the elderly, rehabilitation service, community development service and other supportive services. There are more than 230 units providing social service run by Hong Kong Sheng Kung Hui at present.

=== Education ===
Prior to 1841, the territory known today as Hong Kong had been an extension of Imperial China for many centuries. The changes would come with the arrival of the British colonialisation in 1841. At first Hong Kong's education came from Protestant and Catholic missionaries who provided social services. Italian missionaries began to provide boy-only education to British and Chinese youth in 1843. In 1953, there were 81 Catholic schools and served 28,610 students. The school's number starting to increase till 1979. In 1979, there were 318 Catholic schools and served over 280,000 students. After the booming period, the number of the schools slightly decreased to 270 while the student number kept increased to over 300,000. The peak showed in 1995, there were 327 Catholic schools and served about 290,000 students. The number of the Catholic schools decreased to 248 in 2018 and served over 140,000 students.

==== Post-secondary institutions ====
The first school to open western medical practice to the Far East was the Hong Kong College of Medicine for Chinese in 1887; it was formed under Frederick Lugard, the governor of Hong Kong and established by London Missionary Society, A Christian-based missionary, at the time. The nucleus of the school would later create the foundation for the new and renamed Hong Kong University in 1910.

There were three post-secondary institutions (The Chung Chi College of the Chinese University of Hong Kong, Hong Kong Baptist University and Lingnan University) ran by the Protestant community in Hong Kong. In addition, they operate 16 theological seminaries and Bible institutes, 16 Christian publishing houses and 57 Christian bookshops. Caritas Francis Hsu College is a self-financing degree-granting institution, which was established by Caritas Hong Kong.

==== Kindergarten, primary and secondary schools ====
In education, there are 320 Catholic schools and kindergartens which have about 286,000 pupils. There is the Catholic Board of Education to assist in this area. The Protestant churches run 144 secondary schools, 192 primary schools, 273 kindergartens and 116 nurseries in which 33 secondary schools and more than 50 primary schools are established by the Hong Kong Sheng Kung Hui. It is notable that many schools run by the Church has been getting outstanding results in Public Examinations, such as Diocesan Boys' School, Diocesan Girls' School and St. Paul's Co-educational College.

=== Medical services ===
The Protestant community in Hong Kong runs seven hospitals. The hospitals include Pamela Youde Nethersole Eastern Hospital (co-managed with Hospital Authority), Hong Kong Baptist Hospital (private hospital), United Christian Hospital (co-managed with Hospital Authority), Alice Ho Miu Ling Nethersole Hospital (co-managed with Hospital Authority), Evangel Hospital (private hospital), Haven of Hope Hospital (co-managed with Hospital Authority).

Some of these hospitals have served Hong Kong for a long period of time. Tsan Yuk Hospital was set up by London Missionary Society in 1922 and become a government hospital in 1934. Hong Kong Adventist Hospital and Tsuen Wan Adventist Hospital are other Christian-based hospitals.

Six hospitals are managed by the Catholic community in Hong Kong. Three hospitals in Hong Kong are managed by Caritas-Hong Kong, a Catholic-based charity organisation: Caritas Medical Centre, Canossa Hospital and Precious Blood Hospital. St Paul's Hospital and St Teresa's Hospital are managed by the Sisters of St. Paul de Chartres Order, another Catholic based organisation. Our Lady of Maryknoll Hospital is founded in 1961 by the Maryknoll Sisters.

The establishment of Pamela Youde Nethersole Eastern Hospital

Before the establishment of the hospital, there were three government clinics but no hospitals in the Eastern District, a district with population of 440,000 in 1980s. The injuries of the Eastern District shared 40% of the death of the Hong Kong Island's injuries who was reaching the hospitals by ambulance, according to a report by a Christian-based charity organisation. In August 1982, several churches in the District formed an organisation to force the then Colonial Government to establish a hospital, leading to the establishment of Pamela Youde Nethersole Eastern Hospital. The organisation also urged the government to improve the medical service provided in the District.

== Conflict with the government ==
=== Preservation of heritage buildings ===
Hoh Fuk Tong Centre

In early 2000s, Hong Kong Council of the Church of Christ in China (the owner of Ho Fuk Tong Centre) submitted an application of a redevelopment scheme for the centre, proposing a demolition of all the historical buildings on the site, to the Buildings Department. The two adjoining schools, namely, But San School and Hoh Fuk Tong College, were also proposed to be demolished in the redevelopment scheme.

To protect the historic building from demolition, Morrison House was declared as proposed Monument on 11 April 2003; it was later declared as monument on 26 March 2004.

Kom Tong Hall

In 1960, the Church of Jesus Christ of Latter-day Saints purchased the building. The Church used the Hall for worship services and other local Church activities as well as for administration of its Asia-area humanitarian, building and other programs. As a result of Church growth, locally and throughout Asia over the last four decades, the Church's headquarters were moved out of Kom Tong Hall and into a much larger new 14-story building in Wan Chai, Hong Kong.

The Church no longer had need for the building and was looking to sell the property. It soon became apparent that a vacant lot would yield a far higher amount than if the property were sold intact, and the Church considered demolishing the building. In October 2002, the Church submitted an application for a demolition permit to the Building Authority. However, after hearing concerns raised by friends in the community, and a series of negotiations with the Hong Kong Government, Church officials reached a consensus in selling the property intact and preserving the building.

=== School-based management reform ===
The Education (Amendment) Bill 2002, which was to introduce the school-based management (SBM) governance framework to all aided schools in the city, was introduced in November 2002 and passed in July 2004. The Hong Kong Catholic Diocese, as one of the major schools sponsoring bodies, worried that the Diocese may not run schools according to its vision and mission as representatives of parents, teachers and principals are allowed to sit in the School Management Committee (SMC), causing the politicised atmosphere in SMC. Bishop Zen published his articles to express his opinions on the Bill. He had previously said that "we will reconsider our commitment to education" if the Bill had been passed, leading to the worries of the parents and teachers; later he clarified that it didn't mean that the Hong Kong Catholic Diocese would stop running the Catholic school after the Bill had been passed.

== 2014 Hong Kong protests ==
Many of the participants and leaders of the 2014 Hong Kong protests (i.e. Umbrella movement) are Christians, despite many of the government officials and members of the Pro-Beijing camp which opposed the movement. Joshua Wong, the founder of Scholarism, is an Evangelical Christian who has cited his faith as a motivation for his leadership. Two of the three leaders of Occupy Central, another group supporting the protests, are also Christians. One of their motivations is distrust of the treatment of Christians by the Chinese government. They view democracy as a defence against government control. Different denominations, however, are split in their support or opposition to the protests. The Methodist Church of Hong Kong has been openly supportive of the protesters (while did not take any official stances). The Anglican Church in Hong Kong, on the other hand, has encouraged members to stay out of the protests and church leaders opposed the movement. The protesters themselves made a makeshift Christian chapel in the Mong Kok occupation region. The chapel was destroyed when police cleared the area. Protesters rebuilt it the next day.

== Christianity among Hong Kong Universities students ==
According to the Hong Kong University Grant Committee statistics, as of school year 2011/2012, about one quarter (24.6%) of university students were Christian (21.1% Protestant Christian and 3.5% are Catholic). Compared with the general public (12% are Christian), university students are 2 times more likely to be a Christian.

== Freedom of religion ==
In 2023, the region was scored 3 out of 4 for religious freedom; it was noted that the score has gone down from previous years due to evidence that a crackdown on dissent has prompted some churches to self-censor their sermons and activities.

== See also ==
- Religion in Hong Kong
- Korean Christians in Hong Kong
- Christianity in Macau
- Christianity in Hong Kong's neighbouring province
  - Christianity in Guangdong
