= Hong Kong Adventist Hospital =

Hong Kong Adventist Hospital may refer to:

- Hong Kong Adventist Hospital – Stubbs Road, in Hong Kong Island
- Hong Kong Adventist Hospital – Tsuen Wan, in New Territories
