= Wong Man-kong =

Wong Man-kong may refer to:

- Peter Wong Man-kong (1949–2019), politician from Hong Kong
- Timothy Wong Man-kong, historian from Hong Kong
