= Timothy Wong =

Timothy Wong may refer to:

- Timothy C. Wong (born 1941), American sinologist
- Timothy Wong Man-kong, Hong Kong historian
- Timothy Wong Yik, Hong Kong singer and actor
- Timothy Wong (swimmer), Jamaican swimmer, see Jamaica at the 2003 Pan American Games
