= Harry Willis Miller =

American physician and Seventh-day Adventist missionary

- Born: July 1, 1879; Ludlow Falls, Ohio
- Died: January 1, 1977 (aged 97); Riverside, California
- Occupations: Physician, Seventh-day Adventist missionary

Harry Willis Miller (July 1, 1879 – January 1, 1977) was an American physician, thyroid surgeon and Seventh-day Adventist missionary. Miller was a vegetarian and pioneer in the development of soy milk.

== Biography ==
Miller was born in Ludlow Falls, Ohio, on July 1, 1879. He graduated M.D. from the American Medical Missionary College in Battle Creek, in 1902. Miller studied at Rush Medical College and authored an article on blastomycetes in the Journal of Dermatology in 1903. With his wife Maude Thompson Miller, he went to Shanghai in 1903. She died less than two years later from sprue. Miller married Marie Iverson in 1908 and he remained in China until 1956. With Arthur Selmon, he established The Gospel Herald, which was renamed to Chinese Seventh-Day Adventist Press. It was moved to Shanghai in 1909, and in 1911 was renamed to the Signs of the Times Publishing House. He specialized in surgery and as a missionary generalist. He served as a leader of the SDA Church in China. It is estimated that Miller performed 6,000 thyroid operations.

He served as superintendent of the China Mission in Shanghai (1908–1909) and established the China Training Institute in Chouchiakou. He returned to the United States in 1911. Miller was medical director and secretary of Washington Sanitarium (1913–1925). He returned to China in 1925 and managed the Shanghai Hospital and Sanitarium. Miller researched the production of soy milk and published an article in the Chinese Medical Journal on a soy infant formula in 1936. Miller is credited in 1936 with starting the first production of soy milk in Shanghai.

Miller returned to the United States in 1939. He was medical director of Mount Vernon Hospital and established the International Nutrition Laboratory to produce soy products. With his son he formed the International Nutrition Foundation on a 140-acre farm in Mount Vernon. The soy farm produced canned and malted soy milk. His first American soy milk product was known as Soyalac in 1941.

Miller administered hospitals in Shanghai, Hankou and Hubei. He established the Taiwan Adventist Hospital in 1949. He sold his factory, land, and soy milk products to Loma Linda Foods in 1951. Loma Linda Foods was owned by the Seventh-day Adventist Church. However, Miller continued to conduct research in at Loma Linda Food factory in La Sierra until his death. In 1956, he was awarded the Blue Star of China by Chiang Kai-shek. In 1960, Miller helped in forming the Hong Kong Adventist Hospital. In total there were 19 hospitals that Miller was instrumental in starting all over the Far East.

A biography of Miller was published in 1961. Miller died in Riverside, California, on January 1, 1977.

== Vegetarianism ==
Miller stated that he became a vegetarian for its health and longevity aspects. He was a pioneer in popularizing soy milk as a satisfactory substitute for animal milk and making it available to feed the poor in areas where there was no cow's milk. He conducted research on vegetarian meat substitutes and proteins. He was influential in bringing soy-based foods to the United States.

== Selected publications ==
- The Way to Health (1920)
- Tuberculosis: A Curable Disease (1954)
