= Korean International School of Hong Kong =

International school in Hong Kong

- 홍콩한국국제학교 香港韓國國際學校
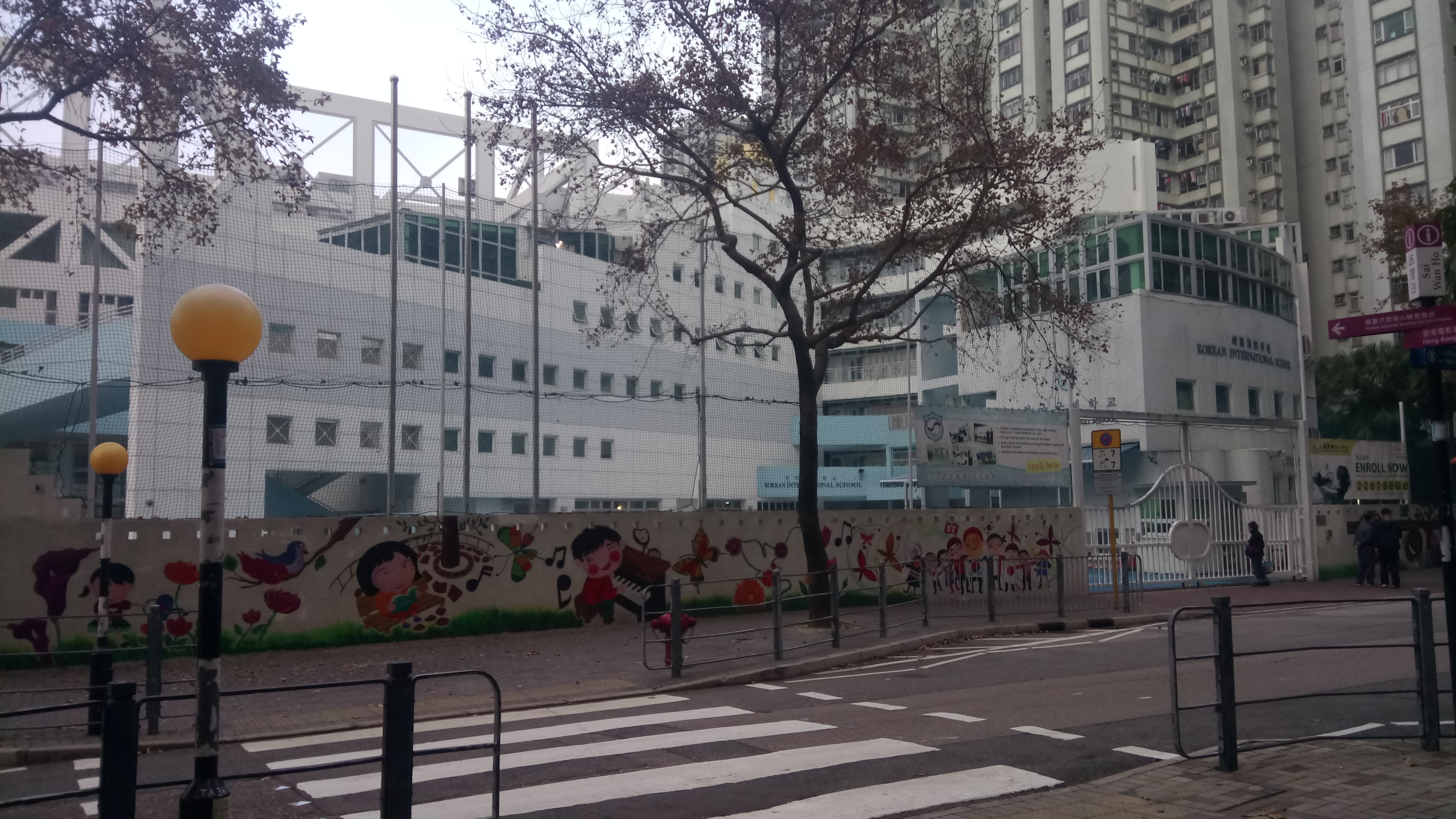

Location
- 55 Lei King Road, Sai Wan Ho 香港西灣河鯉景道55號; Hong Kong; 22°17′7″N 114°13′22″E

Information
- Type: International school
- Motto: Find PASSION; Foster VISION; Encourage ACTION
- Established: February 19th 1994-March 1st 1994
- School district: Sai Wan Ho, HK
- Principal: Daniel Hilton (International section); Song, Byeong Geun (Korean section)
- Staff: ~180+
- Grades: Reception (K3) to Year 13
- Gender: Co-educational
- Enrollment: ~ 900
- Colors: Blue, Red
- Mascot: Tiger
- Website: kis.edu.hk: is.kis.edu.hk*; ks.kis.edu.hk*

Chinese name
- Traditional Chinese: 香港韓國國際學校
- Simplified Chinese: 香港韩国国际学校
Transcriptions
Standard Mandarin
- Hanyu Pinyin: Xiānggǎng Hánguó Guójì Xuéxiào
Yue: Cantonese
- Jyutping: hoeng1 gong2 hon4 gwok3 gwok3 zai3 hok6 haau6

Korean name
- Hangul: 홍콩한국국제학교

The Korean International School of Hong Kong (KISHK, Korean: 홍콩한국국제학교; Chinese: 香港韓國國際學校) is an international school located in Lei King Wan, Sai Wan Ho, Hong Kong. It is located near Grand Promenade and the Tai Koo Shing area, which are home to a large number of Hong Kong's Korean families. The international section was founded in 1994.

== School structure ==
The Korean International School (or sometimes referred to as 'KIS') is divided into two sections based on medium of instruction: the Korean section teaches in Korean, while the international section teaches in English. The school's chairman is Mr. Moon, Ik Seang and the school's supervisor is Mr. JongSeok Lee. Each section has its own principal; Mr Daniel Hilton is the principal of the International section, and Mr Song, Byeong Geun is the principal of the Korean section.

It is one of the few overseas Korean educational institutions which also accepts non-Korean students. As of 2013, it enrolled 560 students. Roughly 5% of its ₩4 billion operating budget is subsidized by the South Korean government.

The school is private school, that has no capital levy or compulsory debentures requirements for student applications.

== Curriculum ==
The school follows the National Curriculum for England as authorized by Cambridge International Examinations (CIE). It is a certified member of CIE's Primary Programme, with access to the wealth of support resources produced by CIE. The English Second Language Programme also follows CIE's programs of study with students sitting external exams offered at the British Council.

The International section, consists of three programmes: Primary (Reception to Year 6) for ages 4–11, Secondary (Year 7–13) for ages 12–18, and Springboard (SEN) for ages 6–18.

The Primary programme offers the thematic units from the International Early Years Curriculum (IEYC) for Reception and International Primary Curriculum (IPC) for Year 1 to 6. The Secondary programme from Year 7 to 13 offers the curriculum developed by Cambridge Assessment International Education, AQA and Pearson BTEC. The Springboard SEN programme offers support for children who have mild to moderate learning disabilities.

== Houses and point system ==
The school follows a traditional 'house' feature in British schools which exists to provide pastoral care and healthy competition between the students of each four houses. Students are allocated into 4 Houses. These are named after different animals (Leopard Cat, Red Fox, Black Kite and Fin Whale) in primary and four houses in secondary, named after the elements (Earth, Fire, Wind, Water). There is also Metal for the Senior Leadership Team (SLT) of the school. Prior to 2023, the houses for primary were Cougars, Eagles, Lions and Pandas, and Apollo and Artemis for secondary. Throughout the academic year, teachers award points to students for effort, good behavior, school representation, and sports achievement. These points are tallied up each month to determine the "House of the Month" reward. At the end of the year, there is a final competition to announce the "Winning House".

== History ==
=== Early growth ===
The origin was a Saturday school established in 1960; it initially had six students.

Discussions about the need for an international school to serve Koreans in Hong Kong began as early as the 1980s, and the Korean International School finally began operating in 1994, with both a Korean section and an English section. Roughly half of the HK$70 million costs of constructing the campus was funded by the South Korean government, with the rest funded by donations from the local Korean community.

In the first year, the Korean section enrolled 140 students, while the English section enrolled 120. The English section of their middle school division began full operation in August 1997 with the establishment of the 9th grade.

In 1996, KIS became the first international school in Hong Kong to introduce a special education program for developmentally delayed children; normally in Hong Kong, separate schools are set up to offer such programs, but KIS chose to establish a small special education class within the school, consisting of roughly 10 students, because of the demand for it among the community.

Early on in its history, the school experienced rapid growth; however, this was disrupted by the economic aftershocks of the 1997 Asian financial crisis, during which student numbers dropped from 250 to 190.

=== 2000s ===
In 2007, Peter Leesinky was appointed as principal and introduced the International General Certificate of Secondary Education (IGCSE) into the school curriculum. Since 2008, KIS has worked with Operation Santa Claus (OSC) to spread the festive spirit of Christmas and to raise funds. Joining OSC has become a long-established event.

Many local students applied to study A-Levels (Advanced Level qualifications) in 2010 due to changes in the local school curriculum, as mentioned "local students who see risks in upcoming changes in form 5 and 6 curriculum".

With the growing adoption of International Baccalaureate (IB) curriculum in many international schools. The Korean International School, on the other hand, has kept on to the A-level component of its curriculum. The school management believed that the Cambridge qualification gave students a 'huge choice' of subjects and allowed for more control over the curriculum and flexibility to incorporate local components, something the IB did not allow for. Additionally, A-Level qualifications are more widely recognized by universities around the world.

In 2011, Lynne Thomson was appointed as the principal. The following year, a ceremony was held to celebrate and announce the construction of a new block extension. During the same year, new computer and science areas were established at KIS. Samsung generously donated computers to develop two state-of-the-art computer rooms known as Samsung Digital Room I and II. Additionally, interactive whiteboards were introduced into all Primary classrooms, while wireless projectors were installed in secondary classrooms, enabling Internet resources to be available to all classrooms in the school. KIS took pride in being a leader in ‘IT-based Education’.

=== Recent years & recognition ===
In 2016, Christopher Chadwick was appointed as the principal of the International section. Chadwick had previously served as the principal of French International School (FIS) and was familiar with the type of dual-stream curriculum commonly used by schools catering to expatriate families from different countries.

Chadwick retired in July 2023. Daniel Hilton was appointed as the principal in August 2023. The school continues to grow, with both sections combined there is over 900 students representing 25 nationalities in the community. During the academic year 2025-26, the school continues to expand its institutional accreditations and whole-school development initiatives. In the International Section, its careers provision was awarded the Quality In Careers Standard (QCS) accreditation, while the Primary section achieved Recognition status through the International Curriculum Association (ICA) for the International Early Years Curriculum (IEYC) and International Primary Curriculum (IPC). Meanwhile the International Section also completed the review process for accreditation with the Global Safeguarding Collaborative (GSC), pending final confirmation, as well as the required evaluation components for the Council of British International Schools (COBIS) accreditation, which remains subject to final board approval.

=== Staff layoffs and bribery investigation ===
In June 2006, the Korean International School's managing organisation, the Korean Residents' Association, was investigated by the Independent Commission Against Corruption; their office was searched, and one staff member was charged with having received HK$100,000 in bribes related to the renegotiation of a real estate management company's contract and sentenced to eight months' imprisonment. Local Koreans felt shaken by the investigations and expressed their loss of confidence, some committed suicide in the managing organisation as a result. Back in 2004, KIS terminated 26 staff in what they described as a "drastic restructuring" of their curriculum. Then-principal Steven Kim says the teachers were not fired but instead laid off with four months notice; the teachers in question disputed this, claiming instead that they had not been told of the decision until late in the year. Parents in the Korean community were unhappy with the sudden changes and chose to transfer their children to other schools as a result. They expressed frustration that they were not consulted regarding a matter involving so many staff; of particular concern to them was the removal of Doug Anderson, former head of the school's English section. Anderson was sent on "extended home leave" and replaced by Taras Kozyra.

=== 2016 corruption scandal ===
In December 2016, The Korean International School of Hong Kong was discovered to have embezzled South Korean government subsidies, amendment of articles of incorporation, and appropriation of certain funding by board members. This highlighted a lack of transparency among school leadership, with the chairman, board members and some employees using embezzled money for their own personal use instead of educational purposes. Eventually, those involved were subjected to disciplinary actions.

== 2026-11-17 ==
On the 17th of November in 2026, a message was sent to KIS school and parent accounts that the message says that the a member of staff is concerned. More information about this has been kept secret to pretect their identity. As while I am writing this edit, there is no more evidence.

== See also ==
- Koreans in Hong Kong
- Consulate General of South Korea in Hong Kong
