= Hong Kong Chinese Christian Churches Union =

Coordinates: 22.33410°N 114.18754°E

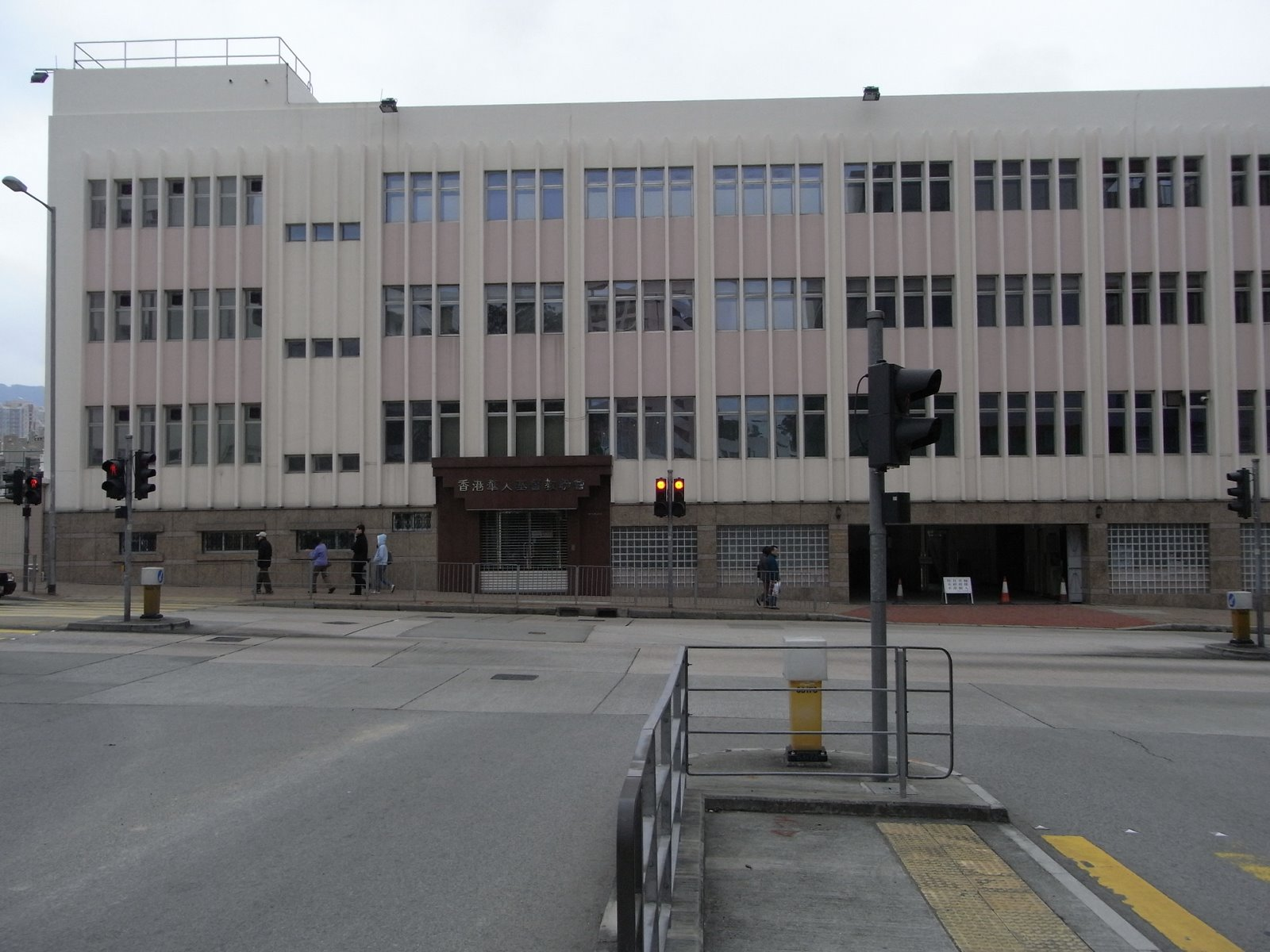
the Union Building on Junction Road

The Hong Kong Chinese Christian Churches Union (HKCCCU) (simplified Chinese: 香港华人基督教联会; traditional Chinese: 香港華人基督教聯會; pinyin: Xiānggǎng Huárén Jīdūjiào Liánhuì) is an inter-denominational organization in Hong Kong with Chinese Christian churches as its membership base. It was founded by seven Protestant denominations in 1915, and now has become one of the largest Christian organizations in Hong Kong, with more than 400 member churches.

== Overview ==
In 1915, the Hong Kong Chinese Christian Churches Union was founded by seven churches: the Anglican Church, the London Missionary Society (Church of Christ in China), the Basel Mission (Tsung-Tsin Mission), the Methodist Church, the Rhenish Mission, the Congregational Church, and the Baptist Church. In 1948, it was registered as a legal organization (Hong Kong Register of Societies No.1025) . The union has now developed to 414 member churches from different denominations and independent churches, with a total number of over 400,000 believers. All member churches, regardless of denomination or size, enjoy equal rights and obligations. Except for the regulations set out in its constitution, the Union does not interfere with the internal administration of the member churches.

The Hong Kong Chinese Christian Churches Union is regarded as one of the two largest Christian organizations in Hong Kong, the other one being the Hong Kong Christian Council.

== Missions ==
The missions or objectives of the Hong Kong Chinese Christian Churches Union are as follows:

To spread the gospel

To connect the Chinese Christian churches in Hong Kong

To promote the spirit of mutual assistance among church members

To carry out the common ministries of the churches, such as literature, medicine, education and other charitable welfare ministries

To manage cemeteries, non-profit nursing homes, schools, camps, clinics, hospitals, medical ministries and other ministries.

== Organization ==
The highest level of the Union is the Member Churches Representative Assembly, which meets annually in April and October. Under the Assembly is the Board of Directors, which meets every two months. Under the Board of Directors is the Executive Board. The current Chairman of the Executive Board is Reverend Zhong Jiankai (Chinese: 鍾健楷牧師; Term of office: June 1, 2025, to May 31, 2026).

== Members ==
As of on September 12 of 2025, there are 414 member churches in the list displayed on the official website of the Union.

== Christian Weekly ==
On August 30, 1964, the union founded the "Christian Weekly" (Chinese: 基督教週報), a weekly newspaper to promote Gospel spreading through written texts, and to play the role of a platform for churches to express their views. The contents of the articles are on spiritual cultivation, sharing, Bible study, theological analysis, faith life, response to current affairs, family counseling, etc.

== Logos Academy ==
In 2000, HKCCCU established Logos Academy, its first school for both primary and secondary education based on the Bible.

== See also ==
- Christianity in Hong Kong
- Hong Kong Christian Council
- Christian Weekly
