= Taiwan Adventist Hospital =

Hospital in Songshan, Taipei, Taiwan

Taiwan Adventist Hospital 臺安醫院
- Seventh-day Adventist Church
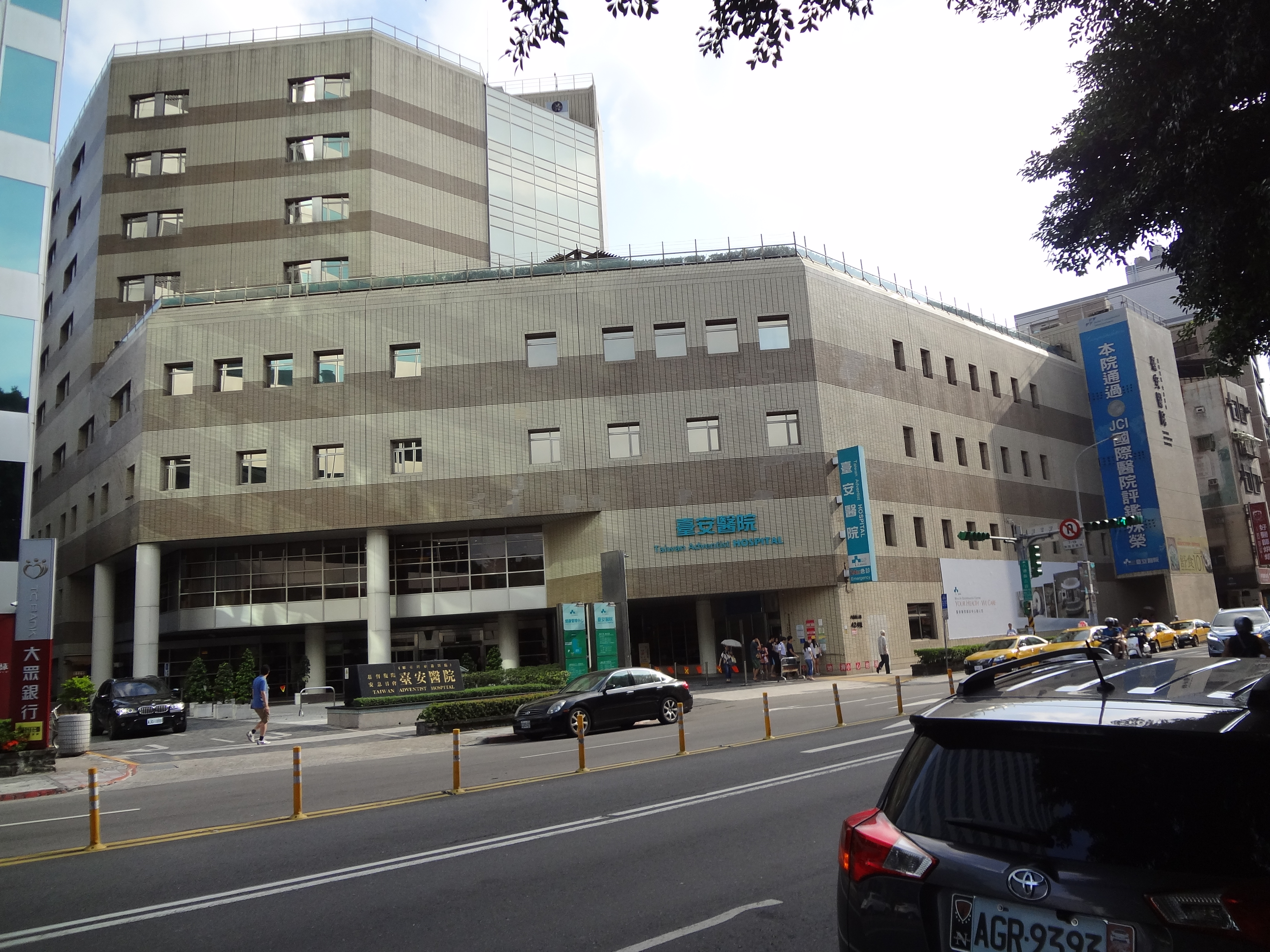

Geography
- Location: Songshan, Taipei, Taiwan
- Coordinates: 25°02′52.4″N 121°32′50.7″E

Organisation
- Care system: Private
- Type: General
- Patron: Harry Willis Miller

Services
- Emergency department: Yes
- Beds: 442

History
- Founded: 1949

Links
- Website: Official website

The Taiwan Adventist Hospital (TAH; traditional Chinese: 臺安醫院; simplified Chinese: 台安医院; pinyin: Tái'ān Yīyuàn) is a non-profit Seventh-day Adventist hospital in Songshan District, Taipei, Taiwan. Since 1989, Taiwan Adventist Hospital has been giving medical care to patients from Australia, Canada, India, Japan, Korea, United States, United Kingdom, and many other countries.

== History ==
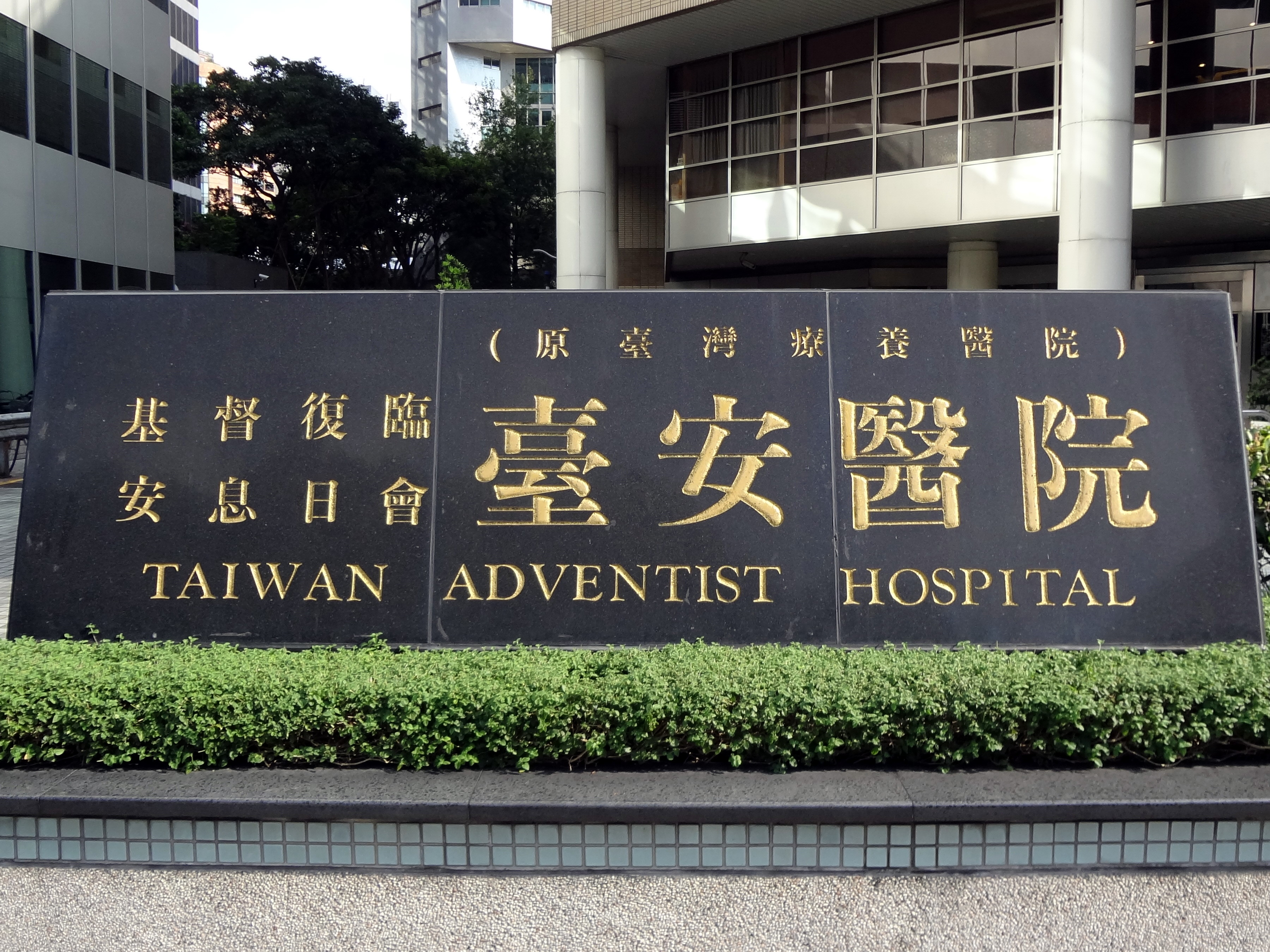
Taiwan Adventist Hospital stele

The hospital was relocated from Shanghai to Taipei in 1949, after mainland China was conquered by the Communists. Dr. Harry Willis Miller re-established it as Taiwan Sanitarium Hospital. Madame Chiang Kai-shek cut the ribbon on March 28, 1955, when the new hospital was completed. Later it was renamed Taiwan Sanitarium and Hospital, after it expanded its services. The hospital originally had 70 beds and later increased that number to 220. In 1971, the hospital started community health care work, and changed its name to Taiwan Adventist Hospital. After it became too small, a new hospital was built at the same location in 1986. In 2006, the hospital got the permission from the Department of Health for a new hospital and teaching hospital accreditation system. On February 21, 2012, Taiwan Adventist Hospital became the first hospital to be certified by SGS against the ISO 50001:20011 Energy Management Systems Standard.

== Muslim-friendly hospital ==
The city of Taipei has been working with Taiwan Adventist Hospital to make the city more friendly to Muslims. In 2018 Taiwan Adventist Hospital became the first hospital in Taiwan to be certified by the Indonesian Ulema Council, the nation's top Islamic body. To be qualified it has to have cosmetics, meet drug and food requirements, have a prayer room with a Quran, prayer rug and washing facility.

== International care ==
Taiwan Adventist Hospital established the International Healthcare Center in 2008, to provide healthcare to people from other countries. In September 2017, Taiwan Adventist Hospital signed a memorandum of understanding with Australia to start treating asylum seekers and refugees. It started treating in January 2018, refugees and asylum seekers from Nauru Regional Processing Centre who needed urgent medical care. In January 2020, Guam Memorial Hospital and Taiwan Adventist Hospital signed a memorandum of understanding, to send patients to Taiwan for treatment.

== Award ==
In 2018, Taiwan Adventist Hospital was awarded the Friend of Foreign Service Medal for its medical diplomacy work for Palau and Solomon Islands.

== Accreditation ==
Taiwan Adventist Hospital is accredited by the Taiwan Department of Health Accreditation and by the Joint Commission International.

== See also ==
- List of hospitals in Taiwan
- List of Seventh-day Adventist hospitals
