= Hong Kong Christian Council =

The Hong Kong Christian Council (Also known as HKCC; Chinese: 香港基督教協進會) is a Christian ecumenical organization founded in Hong Kong in 1954. It is a member of the World Council of Churches and the Christian Conference of Asia. The current general secretary is Rev Dr Lo Lung-kwong, the previous Director of the Divinity School of Chung Chi College, Chinese University of Hong Kong, effective from 1 July 2018.

Although not all Protestant churches in Hong Kong are members of the Christian Council, the HKCC assists to select the election committee of the Chief Executive of Hong Kong in the Protestant sector.

Notable leaders include Rev. Kwok Nai-wang, a senior pastor of the Hong Kong Council of the Church of Christ in China.

The Hong Kong Christian Service is the service arm of the Hong Kong Christian Council. All Executive Committee members of the Hong Kong Christian Council are members of the Hong Kong Christian Service.

== Member churches ==
- Chinese Christian Literature Council
- Christian Action Hong Kong (Part of Christian Aid)
- Evangelical Lutheran Church of Hong Kong
- Finnish Evangelical Lutheran Mission
- German-speaking Evangelical Lutheran Congregation in Hong Kong
- Hong Kong Bible Society
- Hong Kong Council of the Church of Christ in China
- Hong Kong Japanese Christian Fellowship
- Hong Kong Sheng Kung Hui
- Hong Kong Young Women's Christian Association (HKYMCA)
- Kowloon Union Church
- Lutheran Theological Seminary, Hong Kong
- The Methodist Church, Hong Kong
- Orthodox Metropolitanate of Hong Kong and South East Asia
- The Salvation Army Hong Kong and Macau Command
- Tao Fong Shan
- Tsung Tsin Mission of Hong Kong
- Union Church Hong Kong
- YMCA of Hong Kong

== See also ==
- Christianity in Hong Kong
- Hong Kong Chinese Christian Churches Union
