= Consulate General of South Korea, Hong Kong =

Consulate General of the Republic of Korea in Hong Kong 주 홍콩 대한민국 총영사관 大韓民國駐香港總領事館 Consulado Geral da República da Coreia em Hong Kong

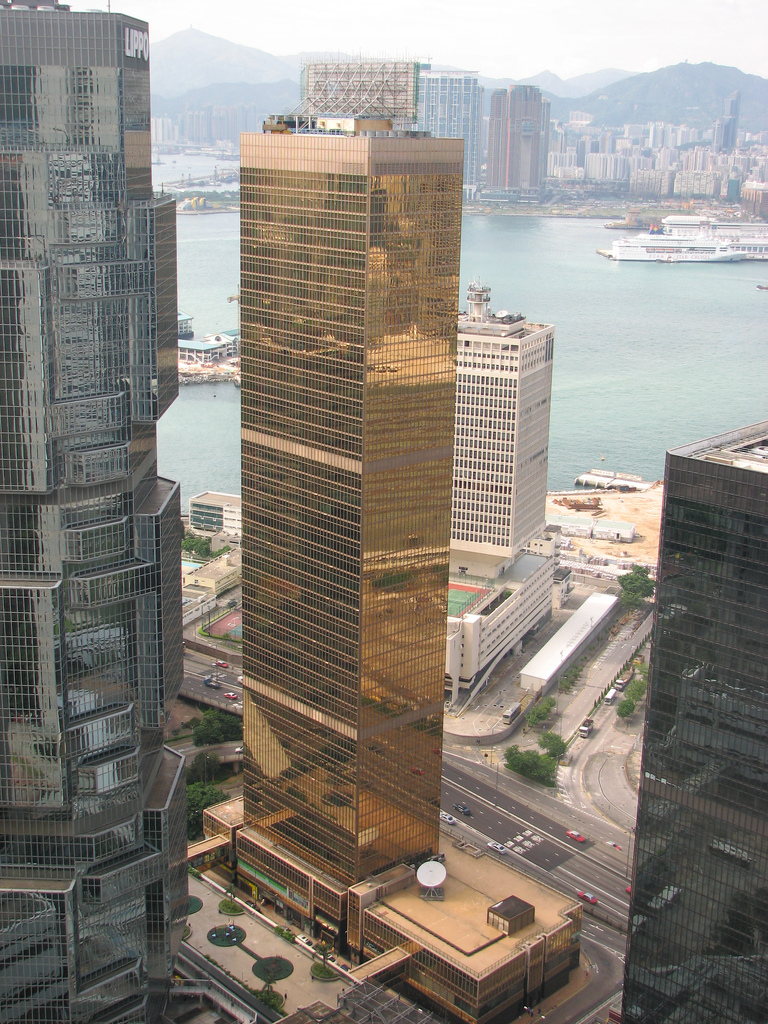
- Far East Finance Centre, in which the Consulate General is located
- Location: Admiralty, Hong Kong
- Address: 5-6F, Far East Finance Center 16, Harcourt Road
- Coordinates: 22°16′48.7″N 114°09′50.4″E
- Consul General: Chun Sung-hwan (acting)
- Website: http://hkg.mofa.go.kr/

Consulate General of South Korea, Hong Kong

Korean name
- Hangul: 주 홍콩 대한민국 총영사관
- Hanja: 駐홍콩大韓民國總領事館
Transcriptions
- Revised Romanization: Ju Hongkong Daehanminguk Chongnyeongsagwan
- McCune–Reischauer: Chu Hongk'ong Taehanmin'guk Ch'ongnyŏngsagwan

Chinese name
- Traditional Chinese: 大韓民國駐香港總領事館
- Simplified Chinese: 大韩民国驻香港总领事馆
Transcriptions
Standard Mandarin
- Hanyu Pinyin: Dàhán Mínguó zhù Xiānggǎng Zǒnglǐngshìguǎn
Yue: Cantonese
- Jyutping: daai6 hon4 man4 gwok3 zyu3 hoeng1 gong2 zung2 ling5 si6 gun2

The Consulate General of South Korea in Hong Kong (Korean: 주 홍콩 대한민국 총영사관; Chinese: 大韓民國駐香港總領事館; Portuguese: Consulado Geral da República da Coreia em Hong Kong) is a consular mission of the Republic of Korea (ROK) to Hong Kong and Macau. It is located at 5-6F, Far East Finance Center 16, Harcourt Road, Admiralty, Hong Kong. It is one of the first South Korean overseas missions since the country's foundation, opened in British Hong Kong under approval of the United Kingdom in 1949, going through promotion and expansion in its history. Following the Transfer of sovereignty over Hong Kong to China in 1997, the Consulate General was able to keep its presence according to a Sino-Korean agreement concerning foreign missions stationed in Hong Kong.

== History ==
The foundation of the Korean consular mission in Hong Kong has a background of the country's external trade. With the trade between Korea and Hong Kong started in 1947 and the establishment of Anglo-Korean diplomatic relations in 1949, progress was gained on setting up a consulate. On 8 February 1949, a letter from the British Government was sent to South Korea's Ministry of Foreign Affairs (MOFA) with approval on the Consulate. Cha Kyun-chan, then Director of the MOFA's Investigation Bureau (외무부조사국), was appointed as the first Consul to Hong Kong, and went to his post by plane on 9 April. The Consulate was opened on 1 May, making it one of South Korea's first five missions abroad since the establishment of ROK Government.

On 29 November of the same year, the Consulate was promoted to the status of Consulate General, with Lee Jung-bang, councillor of the Korean Embassy to the Republic of China (ROC) became the first Consul General under appointment of the Korean MOFA. The Consulate General had its consular jurisdiction over both Hong Kong and Macau, and was relocated to several locations during the British colonial era, including Room 833-835, Man Yee Building, 67-71 Queen's Road, Room 2107-9, Realty Building. 71 Des Voeux Road and Korea Center Building, 3/F, 119-121, Connaught Road.

In 1980s, hotline between the Korean Consulate General and the Chinese Xinhua News Agency's Hong Kong Branch became an important communication channel between Seoul and Beijing following the hijacking of CAAC Flight 296 in 1983 and the desertion of Chinese Navy's Torpedo Boat 3213 to Korea in 1985. Also in 1985, in response to its contact to China on the field of economics, South Korea expanded the Consulate General on the mission's organization, function and the scale of diplomatic corps assigned to it, helping Korean companies and nationals in Hong Kong to trade with China. Korean diplomats with higher level was also assigned to Hong Kong as mission chiefs. Later in 1997, South Korea made consultation with China concerning the existence of the Korean Consulate General in Hong Kong, which was about to be transferred to China by the UK. On 15 April, resolution on the maintenance of Consulate General was made by the State Council of South Korea, and the two countries reached an agreement on 24 April, allowing the Consulate General to keep its presence in Hong Kong, the new Special administrative regions of China.

On 6 October 2009, the Korean Consulate General celebrated the 60th anniversary of its establishment, and a banquet was hosted to enhance the globalization of Korean cuisine. On 30 June of the same year, vacant space inside the Consulate General's auditorium and Consular Section (민원실) was used to set up a new Cultural Center (문화관) with exhibition sites and several kinds of IT equipment for cultural exchange. It was in February 2014 that the Consulate General opened its Korea Reference Room (한국 자료실), which had a collection of 500 books in Korean, Chinese, English and 250 pieces of DVDs, containing resources like humanities, history, literature and publicity-related information issued by the Korean Government.

== Heads of mission ==
Heads of the South Korean mission to Hong Kong
No.	Names	Names in Hangul/Hanja	Tenure started	Tenure ended	Ref
Consuls
1	Cha Kyun-chan	차균찬(車均燦)	16 April 1949	11 May 1949	
2	Kim Yong-shik	김용식(金溶植)	11 August 1949	27 November 1949	
Consuls General
1	Lee Jung-bang	이정방(李鼎邦)	27 November 1949	20 December 1952	
2	Park Chang-joon	박창준(朴昌俊)	20 December 1952	23 August 1956	
3	Kang Choon-hee	강춘희(姜春熙)	23 August 1956	12 November 1960	
4	Choi Moon-kyung	최문경(崔文卿)	8 March 1961	11 July 1962	
5	Moon Duk-choo	문덕주(文德周)	11 July 1962	19 October 1964	
6	Chin P'il-sik	진필식(陳弼植)	1 November 1964	3 November 1966	
7	Chang Sang-moon	장상문(張相文)	4 November 1966	31 October 1967	
8	Yun Kyong-do	윤경도(尹慶道)	5 November 1967	9 January 1972	
9	Park Chang-nam	박창남(朴昌南)	10 January 1972	14 February 1974	
10	Ryee Soo-woo	이수우(李秀佑)	15 February 1974	30 August 1977	
11	Lee Chang-soo	이창수(李昌洙)	1 September 1977	20 December 1980	
12	Kim Tae-ji	김태지(金太智)	31 March 1981	20 May 1984	
13	Kim Chong-hun	김정훈(金正勳)	1 June 1984	18 October 1985	
14	Kim Jae-chun	김재춘(金在春)	18 October 1985	29 October 1987	
15	Kim E-myung	김이명(金以銘)	5 November 1987	30 June 1990	
16	Chong Min-kil	정민길(鄭旼吉)	5 July 1990	30 April 1993	
17	Nam Hong-u	남홍우(南洪祐)	5 May 1993	15 March 1996	
18	Park Yang-chun	박양천(朴楊千)	20 March 1996	15 April 1998	
19	Shin Doo-byong	신두병(申斗柄)	4 May 1998	31 December 2000	
20	Kim Kwang-dong	김광동(金光東)	12 February 2001	19 January 2002	
21	Kang Keun-taik	강근택(姜根鐸)	26 February 2002	6 September 2004	
22	Cho Hwan-bok	조환복(趙煥復)	13 September 2004	2 March 2007	
23	Seok Tong-youn	석동연(石東演)	21 March 2007	6 March 2010	
24	Jun Ok-hyun	전옥현(全玉鉉)	8 March 2010	16 September 2012	
25	Cho Yong-chun	조용천(趙鏞天)	19 September 2012	25 March 2015	
26	Kim Kwang-dong	김광동(金光東)	18 April 2015	19 September 2017	
27	Kim Weon-jin	김원진(金元辰)	10 January 2018	1 December 2020	
28	Baek Yong-chun	백용천(白龍天)	8 December 2020	19 May 2023	
29	Yoo Hyung-cheol	유형철(柳泂喆)	26 May 2023	13 July 2025	
	Chun Sung-hwan	천성환(千成煥)	13 July 2025		Acting

== See also ==
- List of diplomatic missions of South Korea
- Consular missions in Hong Kong
- Koreans in Hong Kong
- Korean International School of Hong Kong
