= Christian Weekly =

Christian Weekly (Chinese: 基督教週報) is a weekly newspaper published by the Hong Kong Chinese Christian Churches Union. Founded in 1964, Christian Weekly is one of the oldest Christian publications in Hong Kong. It reports on Hong Kong church news and provides a channel for churches to express their views, with the purpose of cultivating Christians and spreading Christian truth.

== History ==
The Christian Weekly was founded by the Hong Kong Chinese Christian Churches Union on August 30, 1964. Its title was written in the inscription of Mr. Liang Hancao (Chinese: 梁寒操), a talented scholar of Guangdong. On August 30, 2014, a Golden Jubilee Thanksgiving Service and Essay Competition Award Ceremony was held at the Hong Kong Chinese Christian Churches Union Hall. The event brought together church leaders and pastoral workers from various denominations, winners of the essay competition and spectators. The newspaper had been published every Sunday for fifty years since its establishment.

On September 7, 2024, The Thanksgiving Service Celebrating the 60th Diamond Jubilee of the Christian Weekly and Dedication of "Hong Kong Church Figures" (Volume 2) was held at Tsim Sha Tsui Baptist Church (31 Cameron Road, Tsim Sha Tsui).

Christian Weekly is now a representative voice of the Hong Kong church. It is also one of the two Chinese Christian newspapers in Hong Kong, the other being the Christian Times.

== Missions ==
The purposes of Christian Weekly are to: report Christian news, cultivate Christian spirituality, and promote Christian truth.

== Contents ==
Christian Weekly reports on church news, and publishes articles on spiritual cultivation, sharing, Bible study, theological analysis, faith life, response to current affairs, family counseling, etc. The articles are written by prominent evangelists, pastors as well as laymen.

== See also ==
- Hong Kong Chinese Christian Churches Union
- Christianity in Hong Kong
