= Kwok Nai-wang =

Hong Kong Christian Council pastor

Rev. Kwok Nai-wang (Chinese: 郭乃弘; b. 1938-) is a retired senior pastor affiliated with the Hong Kong Council of the Church of Christ in China (HKCCCC). He is the former general secretary of Hong Kong Christian Council (HKCC), the former director of the Hong Kong Christian Service (Chinese: 香港基督教服務處) from 1980 to 1988, and the founding director of the Hong Kong Christian Institute (Chinese: 香港基督徒學會, or known as HKCI), a Christian activist group founded in 1988 to promote democracy.

== Biography ==
Kwok was born in a middle-class family. He was the youngest son of Kwok Chung Yu (Chinese: 郭宗宇), a deacon of China Congregational Church and an employee of Jardine Matheson.

He finished his secondary education at Queen's College. He graduated at the University of Hong Kong with BA in Philosophy in 1963 and the Yale Divinity School (YDS) in 1966. In the same year, he was ordained at the Centre Church on-the-Green at New Haven, Connecticut. Upon his return to Hong Kong, he took up the post as a pastor at Shum Oi Church, the Church of Christ in China in Shek Kip Mei from 1966 to 1977. He has also taught in the Chung Chi College from 1966 to 1973. During 1977 to 1988, he was the general secretary of HKCC, before he founded his own NGO, HKCI, to further promote the interaction of society and the Church in Hong Kong. He has also served as the director of the Hong Kong Christian Service between 1980 and 1988.

After retirement, he has taught in Lutheran Theological Seminary in Hong Kong from 2001 onwards. Besides teaching, he also held the post of senior minister at the Kowloon Union Church (KUC) from 2006 to 2008. In 2010, he received the Lux et Veritas award from the YDS, in honor of his contribution to the transformation of the Hong Kong church.

He was also one of the first ten supporters of Occupy Central with Love and Peace, a pro-democracy organization that urges for the universal suffrage of the Chief Executive of Hong Kong.

== Personal life ==
He was married to Dorothy Louise McMahon in 1966 and was divorced in 1973. Together, they had a daughter. He remarried with Dorothy Wong (Chinese: 汪曼華) in 1993. Dorothy Wong was a headmaster at CCC Yenching College. He was diagnosed with lymphoma in 2015 and has since then written a book on his reflection of his cancer journey.

== Writings ==
- Kwok, Nai-wang (1996). 1997: Hong Kong's Struggle for Selfhood. Hong Kong: Daga Press. ISBN 962-7250-19-8
