= Koreans in Hong Kong =

Ethnic group

Total population
- 13,288 (2011)

Regions with significant populations
- Sai Wan Ho, Tsim Sha Tsui, Jordan

Languages
- English, Cantonese, Mandarin, Korean

Religion
- Buddhism, Roman Catholicism, Protestantism

Related ethnic groups
- Korean diaspora

Koreans in Hong Kong formed a population of 13,288 individuals as of 2011, a mid-range size compared to Korean diaspora populations in other cities in China and Southeast Asia.

According to the 2021 population census in Hong Kong, there are 8,700 Koreans living in Hong Kong, plenty of them living in Eastern District and Central and Western District on Hong Kong Island.

Since the Korean International School of Hong Kong is located in Sai Wan Ho, children of most Korean families living in Hong Kong will attend this school. Therefore, many Koreans live in Sai Wan Ho and Taikoo Shing area, forming a Korean community.

== Migration history ==
Some Koreans came to Hong Kong with the Imperial Japanese Army during the Japanese occupation; after the Japanese surrender, US Army records show that the British government repatriated 287 Korean soldiers to Korea. Some Koreans from China came to Hong Kong to settle soon after the war as well.

== Demography ==
Based on 2011 data from the Hong Kong Immigration Department, the Consulate General of South Korea in Hong Kong reported to the Ministry of Foreign Affairs and Trade that there were 13,288 South Korean nationals in Hong Kong. Unlike in Mainland China, their population features a larger number of women than men: 7,613 women (57%) vs. 5,675 men (43%), a sex ratio of 1.34 to 1. 4,005 (30%) have the right of abode in Hong Kong, while the remaining 9,483 (70%) hold other types of visas. South Koreans in Hong Kong belong mostly to the upper-middle class of Hong Kong society. According to census statistics, they are wealthier than the average Hong Kong resident; 42.6% of all South Koreans employed in Hong Kong as of 2006 had a monthly salary of HK$30,000 or greater, as compared to just 10.8% of the whole population. However, despite their higher wages, South Koreans complain that they face far higher living costs in Hong Kong, including medical fees 20–30% higher than those in South Korea.

Virtually all Koreans in Hong Kong are South Korean; however, a few North Korean businesses and diplomats are known to operate in the territory as well. In addition, a minority of North Korean refugees attempt to sneak across the border into the territory to obtain political asylum and transport to South Korea; the United States Committee for Refugees and Immigrants claims that the Hong Kong Police were instructed to keep no record of their arrest or registration.

== Employment ==
Approximately 23.1% of Koreans in Hong Kong work in the finance, insurance, real estate, or business services field; one of the highest proportions out of all ethnic minorities. Among those 23.1% are an estimated 300 who work in the Hong Kong offices of major investment banks; most studied at universities in the United States before returning to Asia to take their present positions. One of the more notable examples is Chi-Won Yoon, who was appointed country head and CEO of UBS AG's Hong Kong branch in March 2008 after two decades of industry experience. The South Korean consulate's report to MOFAT stated that the number of South Koreans in the financial industry was negatively affected by the 2008 financial crisis, but numbers employed in other sectors have actually increased since that time.

Tsim Sha Tsui's Kimberley Street, a side street off of Kimberley Road, also boasts a small concentration of Korean restaurants and grocery stores owned by long-term Korean residents of Hong Kong, and has been dubbed Hong Kong's "Little Korea" as a result.

== Education ==
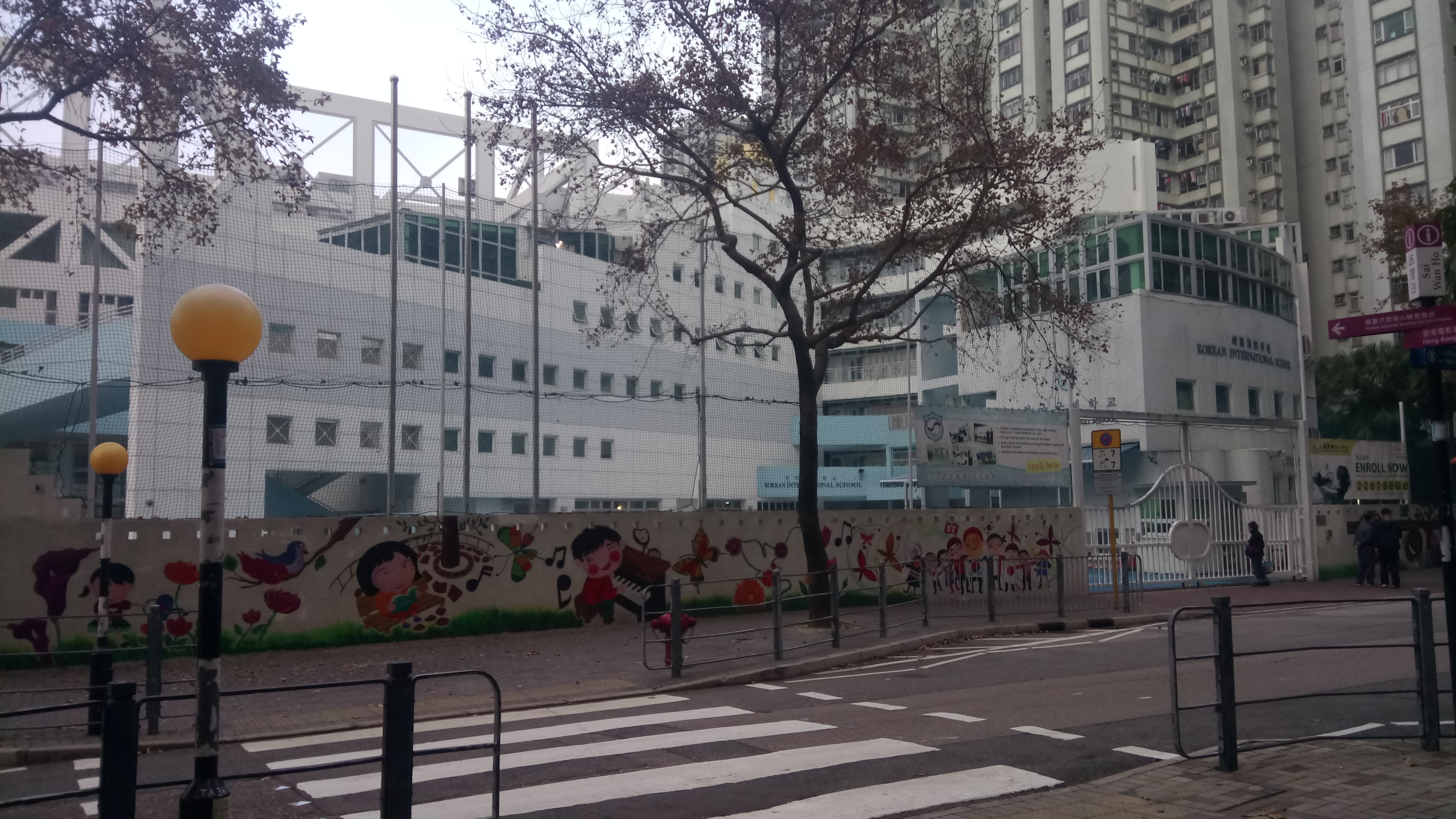
Korean International School of Hong Kong

Hong Kong lacks a Korean-medium kindergarten, and so parents often send their children to English-medium kindergartens instead; some continue on to English-medium primary and secondary schools, such as those run by the English Schools Foundation, and as a result speak English better than Korean. Koreans in Hong Kong have also set up Korean-language educational institutions for their children. The Korean Saturday School (한국토요학원) was established in 1960 by the Association of Korean Residents. The territory's one Korean school, the Korean International School, is located in Sai Wan Ho. Founded in 1994, it enrolled 402 students as of 2006. Children of most Korean families living in Hong Kong will attend this school. Therefore, many Koreans live in Sai Wan Ho and Taikoo Shing area, forming a Korean community.

The number of South Korean students in Hong Kong universities has shown significant growth. In 2008, there were only about 40 South Koreans enrolled in Hong Kong universities, primarily the English-medium University of Hong Kong; they formed just 1% of the 4,000 or so tertiary-level international students in the territory at the time. However, along with China's economic rise, South Korean international students are becoming increasingly interested in studying in the country, and Hong Kong universities have taken advantage of this trend to promote the internationalisation of their student bodies. By 2011, there were 595 South Koreans in Hong Kong on student visas, an increase of 644% since MOFAT's 2009 survey.

Among respondents to the 2011 Census who self-identified as Korean, 19.1% stated that they spoke English as their usual language, 6.8% Cantonese, 2.2% Japanese, 1.3% Mandarin, and 70.6% some other language (e.g. Korean). With regards to additional spoken languages other than their usual language, 71.5% stated that they spoke English, 14.6% Cantonese, 24.0% Mandarin, and 9.7% Japanese. (Multiple responses were permitted to the latter question, hence the responses are non-exclusive and the sum is greater than 100%.) 9.4% did not speak English either as their usual language nor an additional language, while the respective figures for Cantonese and Mandarin were 78.5% and 74.7%.

== Media ==
Hong Kong has two Korean-language newspapers, the Wednesday Journal and the Weekly Hong Kong. Also there is online news media Daily Hong Kong which maintains a business directory page including contact information of Koreans who are engaged in various business industry in Hong Kong.

== Religion ==
There are about 260 Korean Catholic families in Hong Kong; a parish chapel devoted to them was consecrated in mid-2005. A directory published by the Wednesday Journal lists two Korean Buddhist congregations and fourteen Korean Christian churches.

== International relations ==
Consulate General of South Korea in Hong Kong serves South Korean citizens.

Likewise, North Korea has a consulate located on Harbour road.

== Notable people ==
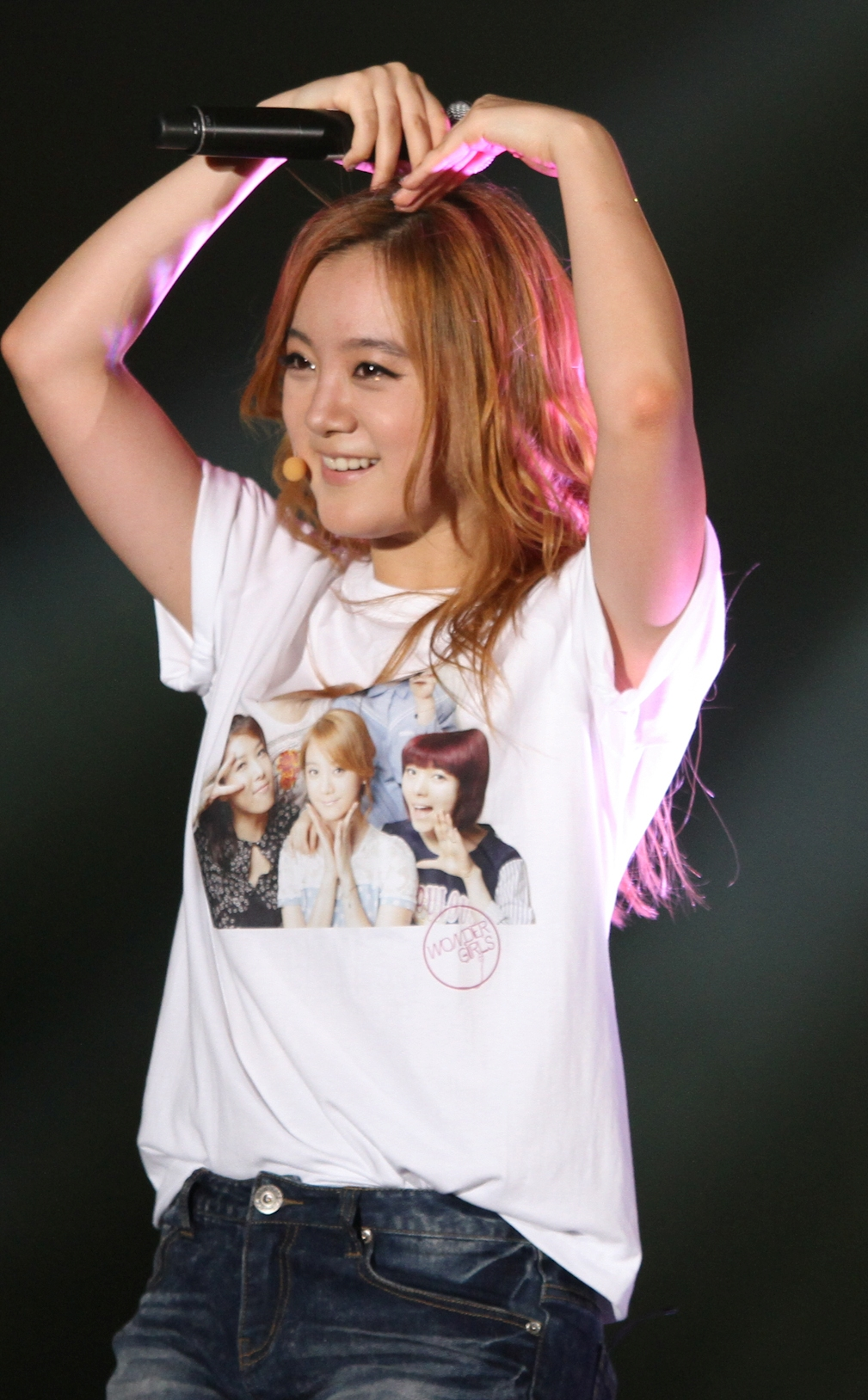
Woo Hye-rim

This is a list of Korean migrants in Hong Kong and Hong Kong people of Korean descent.

- Amigo Choi (崔建邦), TVB actor; born in Hong Kong to a Korean father and Chinese mother
- Angel Sung (宋芝齡), TVB actress; born to a Korean mother and Shanghainese father and grew up in Hong Kong
- Timmy Hung, actor; born to a Chinese father and Korean mother, son of actor Sammo Hung
- Woo Hye-rim, member of South Korean pop group Wonder Girls; lived in Hong Kong during her childhood

== See also ==
- Koreans in China
  - Korean Christians in Hong Kong
- Hong Kong–North Korea relations
