= Korean Christians in Hong Kong =

Ethnoreligious group

According to the Census and Statistics Department of Hong Kong, there were approximately 5 thousand Koreans in 2006, of which 94.4% were usual residents while mobile residents occupied 5.6%. Korean formed one minority group in Hong Kong, constituting 1.4% out of the whole ethnic minority’s population. There were around 2000 Korean immigrant individuals who were Christians.

== Korean Christian development ==
Christian churches in Korea have been increased drastically since 1980 and the world's largest church (Yoido Full Gospel Church) also locates there. Korea comes after the US as the second largest Christian missionary country in the world. There have been more than 17,000 Christian evangelists from Korea sent abroad.

According to an International Bulletin of Missionary Research survey conducted in 2008, Korean churches send out over a thousand of new foreign missionaries every year which presents one of the rapid growing national missionary movements around the world. Korean missionaries served 26 countries around the world in 1979. The number of countries of service rose gradually in years. In 1990 there were 87 countries receiving Korean missionary service which was more than tripled comparing to a decade before. This number almost doubled again in 2006 in which Korean missionary were serving in 168 countries worldwide.

The report showed that the greatest proportion of 47.3% of Korean missionaries served in Asia. It is because Asia is the most populous but least evangelized continent. Thomas Wang, who is the honorary chairman of the Chinese Coordination Centre of World Evangelism (世界華人福音事工聯絡中心), described Korea as the largest missionary country in Asia. Korean Christians consider China as the largest missionary service country. 70% of those who dedicate their life to missionary are willing to serve in China. As China is the main target of Korean missionary work, academic research or any other resources specifically focusing on Korean Christian development in Hong Kong is very rare.

== Migration history ==
The settlement of Koreans in Hong Kong, parts of them Christian, can be traced back to 1948. In the 1960s, economic and trade relations between Korea and Hong Kong were close, therefore Koreans started to settle down and reside in Hong Kong.

== Living conditions ==
Koreans in Hong Kong mostly work in the field of Wholesale, Retail and Import / Export Trades, Restaurants and Hotels, Transport, Storage and Communications, Financing, Insurance, Real Estate and Business Services. Over 80% of the males are "managers and administrators" and "professionals/associate professionals". About 50% of Koreans reside on Hong Kong Island, and 30% of them work in Central and Western District.

Korean Christians form their own community in Hong Kong, all well blended into social, cultural, economic lives and church. There are about 14 Korean Christian churches, mostly located in Hong Kong Island and Kowloon. Apart from churches, Korean Christians also organized religious associations and missionary agencies.

== Korean Christian practices ==
=== Language ===
The language used in the churches is mostly Korean. Some churches offer worship sections in other languages like Cantonese and English.

=== Food and praying ===
Korean Christians are accustomed to having a tea break after every assembly. They appreciate food as the medium of sharing and caring. They pray in the early morning as they think it is good to do so at the beginning of the day. Many Korean churches have Morning Prayer or morning service before the members of the church go to work. Some churches start prayers as early as 5:30 a.m.. Morning Prayer or morning service is provided several days a week or even every weekday in some churches. Hong Kong Elim Presbyterian Church also has mountain prayers every Saturday morning. Church members climb up to the "Jacob's Ladder" on Mount Parker at Quarry Bay to pray for peace and harmony in Hong Kong.

‘Home-cell Group’ system (家庭細胞小組) is uniquely formed in Korean Christianity. It consists of family, family groups, community as well as diocese which are from small to large social systems. Korean ministries believe that the home-cell group system can provide followers with help by solving the challenges and difficulties that they meet in family and daily life. Hong Kong Han Hwa Presbyterian Church which is a Korean church in Hong Kong has introduced a similar form of practice called "family meadow" (家庭牧場). In order to attract Christians and non-Christians, members from the same home-cell group usually visit one's home for their Christian gathering once a week, or even more. Home-cell groups promote family relationship and provide a platform for them to help each other.

=== Connections between missionary agencies and Korean churches ===
A survey conducted by the Korea Research Institute for Missions (KRIM) in 2007 revealed that 18.6% of Korean missionaries worked with international agencies while the remaining 81.4% with Korean agencies. Global Missionary Fellowship (GMF), Global Bible Translators (GBT), Wycliffe Bible Translators and the Global Mission Society (GMS) were voted by the mission executives as the best Korean mission agencies. Apart from this, they also considered the Overseas Missionary Fellowship (OMF), WEC International and Wycliffe (WBT) as the greatest and respected international mission agencies in Korea. OMF has the longest establishment in Korea by receiving and in sending missionaries.

== Other practices/service ==
Some Korean churches like the Hong Kong Cheil Church organize courses for children and they have Saturday Cultural School biweekly, which is organized by the department of agitation and the department of Hangul of the church. The training course under the department of agitation is to let children enjoy body movement and aim to relax them and stabilize their emotion. The training course under the department of Hangul is to improve children's Korean proficiency. Both courses welcome non-members. This church also helps Korean Christians to adapt to life in Hong Kong by providing information on house mortgage and international schools.

== Other existence-Business ==
Hong Kong Christian Council Tyrannus is a place selling Korean merchandises, books, articles and gifts. Customers are welcomed to reserve their seminar rooms for fellowship or group meetings. They hold Korean classes, Cantonese classes, mother school, ribbon crafts, book clubs and worship.

== Visibility in the media ==
The news about Korean Christian in Hong Kong has been published by several local religious magazines. These magazines also report the issues of different national churches in Hong Kong. They are all issued by "Kingdom Ministries" . They publish different languages versions of these magazines for Hong Kong, Macau, mainland China, Taiwan and overseas. One of the magazines is "Kingdom Revival Times (HK)" which is published in May 2004 and the other one is "Kingdom Magazine" which is published since 2000."The Gospel Post Herald" is a multimedia company and they publish an electronic newspaper which is called "The Gospel Post Herald". It has Chinese and English version. It mainly updates the news of Korean Christian, the campaigns they hold or social services for other minorities. "Wednesday Journal" first began in 1995 and it is a free newspaper. It is published on Wednesdays and it is for Korean living in Hong Kong. It is written in Korean. The main content is about the issues happening in Hong Kong and mainland China. There are also some advertisements and news about Korean churches in Hong Kong.

== Social service ==
Korean Christians participate in some local campaigns with other local Christian association, such as taking parades. In 2004, Korean Christian church took part in a large-scale parade to preach and worship their god with other local or other countries’ communions in Hong Kong. As Korean Christian Church do not have intention to show the public what they do on social service, academic research or other research focusing on the social service Korean Christian participate in seem to be rare.

== Korean Christian churches distribution ==
The details of the Korean churches are as follows:

=== Hong Kong Island ===
1. Hong Kong Central Church (홍콩중앙교회) (Language: Korean; District: Central West, Hong Kong; Address: B & C, 7/F, Wing Cheong Commercial Building, 19-25 Jervois Street, Sheung Wan)
2. Hong Kong Koreans Church (홍콩한인교회) (Language: Korean; District: Central West, Hong Kong; Address: 5/F, Wing Tuk Commercial Centre, 177 - 183 Wing Lok Street, Sheung Wan, Hong Kong)
3. Hong Kong Elim Presbyterian Church (홍콩엘림교회) (Language: Korean; District: Taikoo Shing. Hong Kong; Address: G9~10, Nanshan Mansion, P12-13, Heng Shan Mansion, 3 Taikooshing Rd, Taikooshing, Quarry Bay, Hong Kong)
4. Onsarang Presbyterian Church Of Hong Kong Limited(홍콩충현교회) (Language: Korean; District: Sai Wan Ho, Hong Kong; Address: Shop Nos., GA 19–22, G/F, Site A, 55 Tai Hong Street, Lei King Wan, H.K)
5. Full Gospel Church in Hong Kong (홍콩순복음교회)(District: Shueng Wan, Hong Kong; Address: 3/F Tung Ning Building, No.2 Hillier Street, Sheung Wan, Hong Kong)

=== New Territories ===
1. Hong Kong Korean Exodus Mission Church (Language: Korean, Cantonese, English, Putonghua; District: Shatin, N.T.; Address: Unit 511–518, Citymark, 28 Yuen Shun Circuit, Shatin, N.T)
2. Mission Church of Korea (한국선교교회) (District: Shatin, N.T.; Address: 1/F Yan On Bldg, 20-22 Tai Wai Rd, Tai Wai, Sha Tin, HK)
3. Hong Kong Han Hwa Presbyterian Church(韓華以琳長老教會)(District: Yuen Long; Address: Yuen Long Theatre, 9 Yuen Long Tai Yuk Road, Yuen Long, NT, HK)

=== Kowloon ===
1. Presbyterian Church of Korea Dong Shin (HK) Church Ltd (홍콩동신교회) (Language: Korean, English; District: Tsim Sha Tsui, Kowloon; Address: 2/F, Room 204, Lee Wai Commercial Bldg, 1-3A, Hart Avenue, Tsim Sha Tsui, Kowloon)
2. HK-Antioch Church (HK-안디옥교회) (Language: Korean; District: Kowloon City, Kowloon; Address: Room 10, Block D, 2/F, Summit Building, 30 Man Yue Street, Hung Hom)
3. Korean Baptist Church of Hong Kong (香港韓語浸信會 (韓語) 旺角山東街) (Language: Korean; Headquarters: The Baptists Convention of Hong Kong; District: Mongkok, Kowloon; Address: 8/F, Chung Kiu Comm. Bldg., 47-51 Shan Tung ST., Mongkok)
4. Love and Truth Christian Church (Hong Kong Aejin Church홍콩 애진 교회) (Language: Korean, Putonghua, English; District: Tsim Sha Tsui, Kowloon; Address: Rm1001, 10/F, Landwide Commercial Bldg, 118-120 Austin Road, Kowlooon)
5. First Church of Hong Kong Hong Kong Cheil Church홍콩제일교회 (District: East Tsim Sha Tsui, Kowloon; Address: Unit 801–802, 8 / F, Energy Plaza, 92 Granville Road, (East Tsim Sha Tsui) Kowloon, Hong Kong)

== See also ==
- Koreans in Hong Kong
