= Hong Kong Adventist Hospital – Tsuen Wan =

- Seventh-day Adventist Church

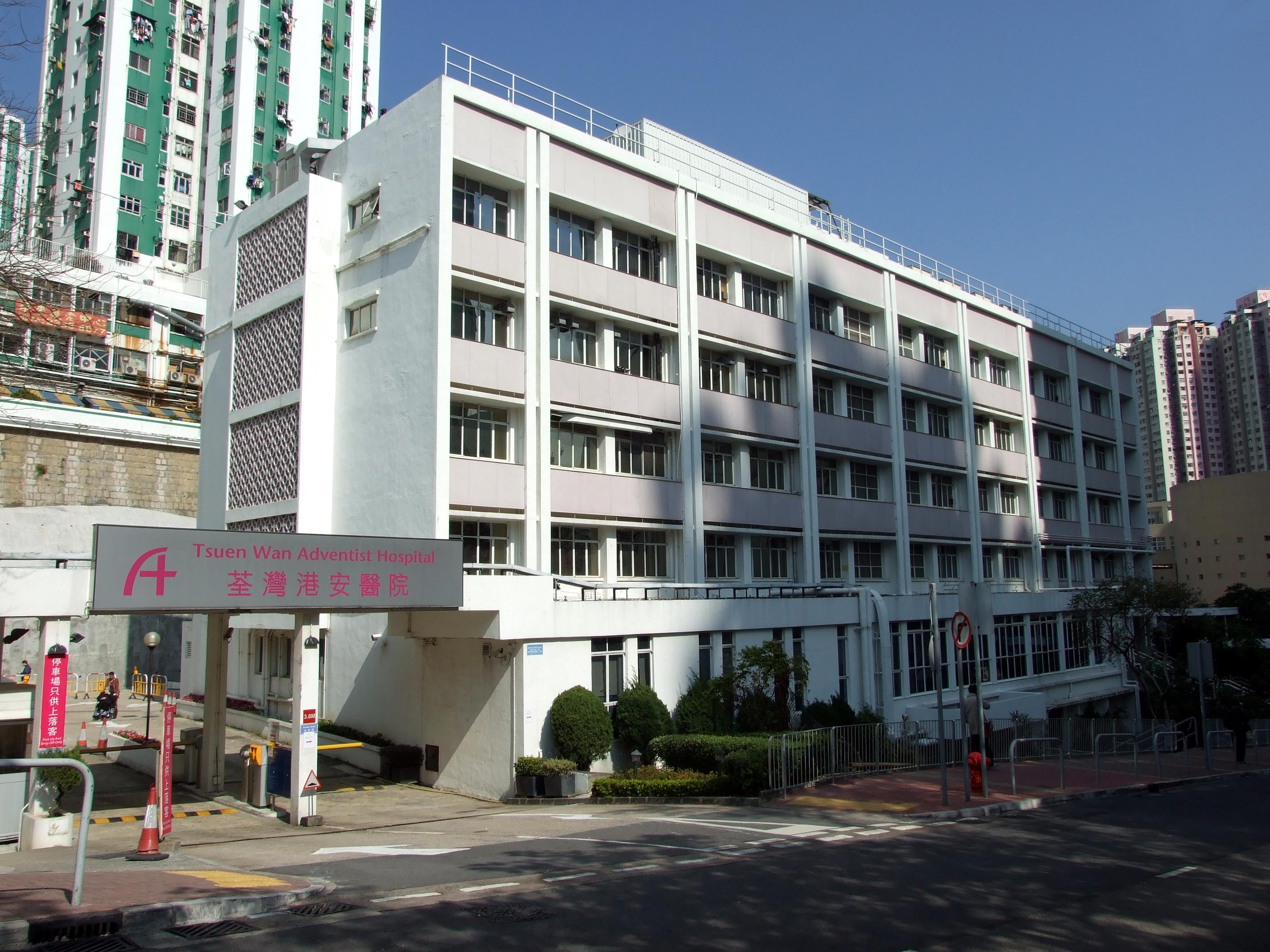
- Hong Kong Adventist Hospital – Tsuen Wan

- Location within Hong Kong

Geography
- Location: 199 Tsuen King Circuit, Tsuen Wan, Hong Kong
- Coordinates: 22°22′36″N 114°06′17″E

Organisation
- Care system: Private
- Type: District General

Services
- Emergency department: Yes Accident & Emergency
- Beds: 470

History
- Founded: 20 May 1964; 62 years ago

Links
- Website: www.twah.org.hk
- Lists: Hospitals in Hong Kong

Hong Kong Adventist Hospital – Tsuen Wan (Chinese: 香港港安醫院–荃灣), previously known as Tsuen Wan Adventist Hospital, is one of two Seventh-day Adventist hospitals in Hong Kong, the other being Hong Kong Adventist Hospital – Stubbs Road.

It is a private sector hospital located in the New Territories. It provides a wide range of services.

Tsuen Wan Adventist Hospital is subject to international healthcare accreditation - for six years it was surveyed and accredited by the United Kingdom's QHA Trent Accreditation. In 2006, it switched accreditors to Joint Commission International (JCI), becoming the first hospital in Hong Kong to receive its accreditation. The hospital was reaccredited by JCI in 2020 and 2023.

== History ==
Dr. Harry Willis Miller was proposed that a hospital should be built "to serve the community and advance the philosophy of the Seventh-day Adventist Church" of Tseun Wan in the late 1960s. Miller had experience in such projects, having helped to establish the Shanghai Sanitarium and Hospital in China.

Miller received a Land grant for the hospital from the British colonial government of Hong Kong. Mr. Tong Ping Yuen, a friend and owner of the South Seas Textile Factory, donated a floor, and the Jockey Club provided funds for the ground floor. The equipment was funded by the government of the United States of America.

The hospital was intended to open May 1964, but had to be delayed due to a lack of funds. A donation from the United States government allowed for the completion of the hospital building in June 1970. Construction of an additional building for the hospital began in 2011 and finished on 17 November 2015.

== See also ==
- List of Seventh-day Adventist hospitals
- List of hospitals in Hong Kong
