= Hong Kong Adventist Hospital – Stubbs Road =

- Seventh-day Adventist Church
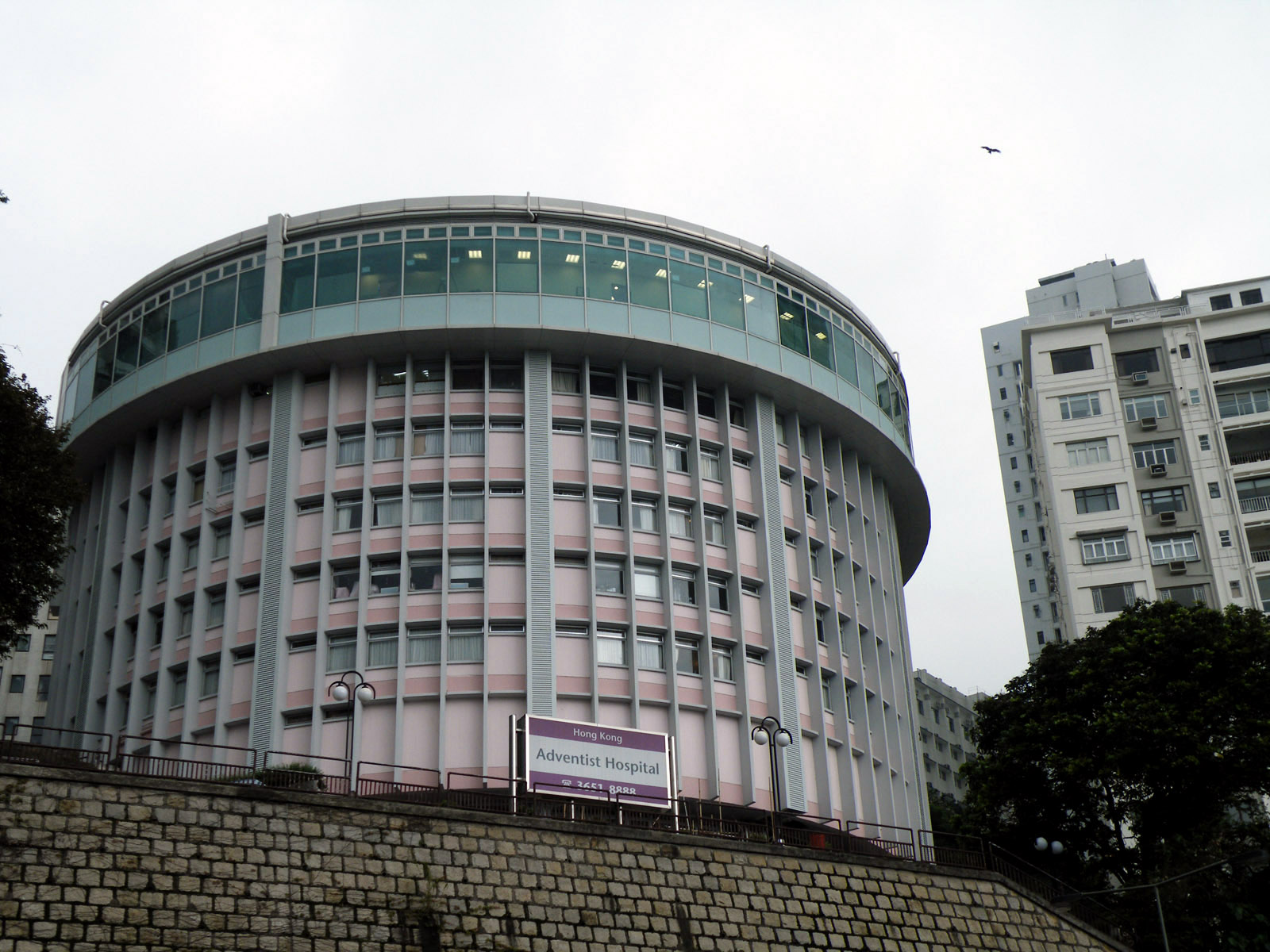

- Location within Hong Kong

Geography
- Location: 40 Stubbs Road, Happy Valley, Hong Kong
- Coordinates: 22°15′49″N 114°11′03″E

Organisation
- Care system: Private
- Type: District General

Services
- Emergency department: Yes Accident & Emergency
- Beds: 125

History
- Founded: 4 May 1971; 55 years ago

Links
- Website: www.hkah.org.hk
- Lists: Hospitals in Hong Kong

Hong Kong Adventist Hospital – Stubbs Road (Chinese: 香港港安醫院–司徒拔道) is one of two Seventh-day Adventist hospitals in Hong Kong, the other being Hong Kong Adventist Hospital – Tsuen Wan. It is a private hospital, and is located on Stubbs Road, on Hong Kong Island. It provides a wide range of medical services.

Hong Kong Adventist Hospital is subject to international healthcare accreditation, it has been surveyed for many years and is accredited by the UK's QHA Trent Accreditation. It has also been assessed by Joint Commission International from the US, but this ended by 2010.

== See also ==
- List of Seventh-day Adventist hospitals
- List of Christian hospitals in China
- List of hospitals in Hong Kong
