= Timothy Wong Man-kong =

Hong Kong historian and associate professor

Timothy Wong Man-kong (Chinese: 黃文江) is a historian from Hong Kong and chair professor within the Department of History at Hong Kong Baptist University. He earned a bachelor's degree [BA in Arts and Social Sciences (History) 1992] from Hong Kong Baptist College followed by MPhil and PhD in History, both at the Chinese University of Hong Kong, under the supervision of Professor Alice Ng Lun Ngai-ha. Wong was elected a fellow of the Royal Historical Society in 2018 and a fellow of the Royal Asiatic Society of Great Britain and Ireland in 2019.

== Writings ==
=== Selected single authored books ===
- Cross-cultural Perspectives on the History of Chinese Protestantism: A Collection of Essays《跨文化視野下的中國基督教史論集》. Taipei: Cosmic Light 宇宙光, 2006.

=== Selected co-authored books ===
- A Documentary History of Public Health in Hong Kong. Hong Kong: Chinese University Press, 2018.
- Between Continuity and Changes: Studies on the History of Chinese Christianity since 1949. 《恆與變之間——1949年以來的中國基督教史論集》 Hong Kong: Alliance Bible Seminary, 2017.
- A History of Hong Kong Baptist University, 1956-2016. 《香港浸會大學六十年發展史》 Hong Kong: The Joint Publishing Company (三聯書店), 2016.
- A Centenary History of St. Paul’s Church, Hong Kong Sheng Kung Hui. 香港聖公會聖保羅堂百年史. Hong Kong: Chung Hwa Bookstore (中華書局), 2013.

=== Selected co-edited books ===
- Western Tides Coming Ashore in a Changing World:Christianity and China's Passage into Modernity 《變局下的西潮：基督教與中國的現代性》 Hong Kong: Alliance Bible Seminary, 2015.

=== Selected journal articles ===
- "The China Factor and Protestant Christianity in Hong Kong: Reflections from Historical Perspectives", Studies in World Christianity, 8 (1): 115–137. doi:10.3366/swc.2002.8.1.115.
