= Sir Ellis Kadoorie School =

Sir Ellis Kadoorie School may refer to:

- Sir Ellis Kadoorie (S) Primary School
- Sir Ellis Kadoorie Secondary School (West Kowloon)
