= Kadoorie School =

Kadoorie School may refer to:

- Kadoorie Agricultural High School in Israel
- Sir Ellis Kadoorie (S) Primary School in Hong Kong
- Sir Ellis Kadoorie Secondary School (West Kowloon) in Hong Kong
