= List of schools in Wan Chai District =

This is a list of schools in Wan Chai District, Hong Kong.

== Secondary schools ==
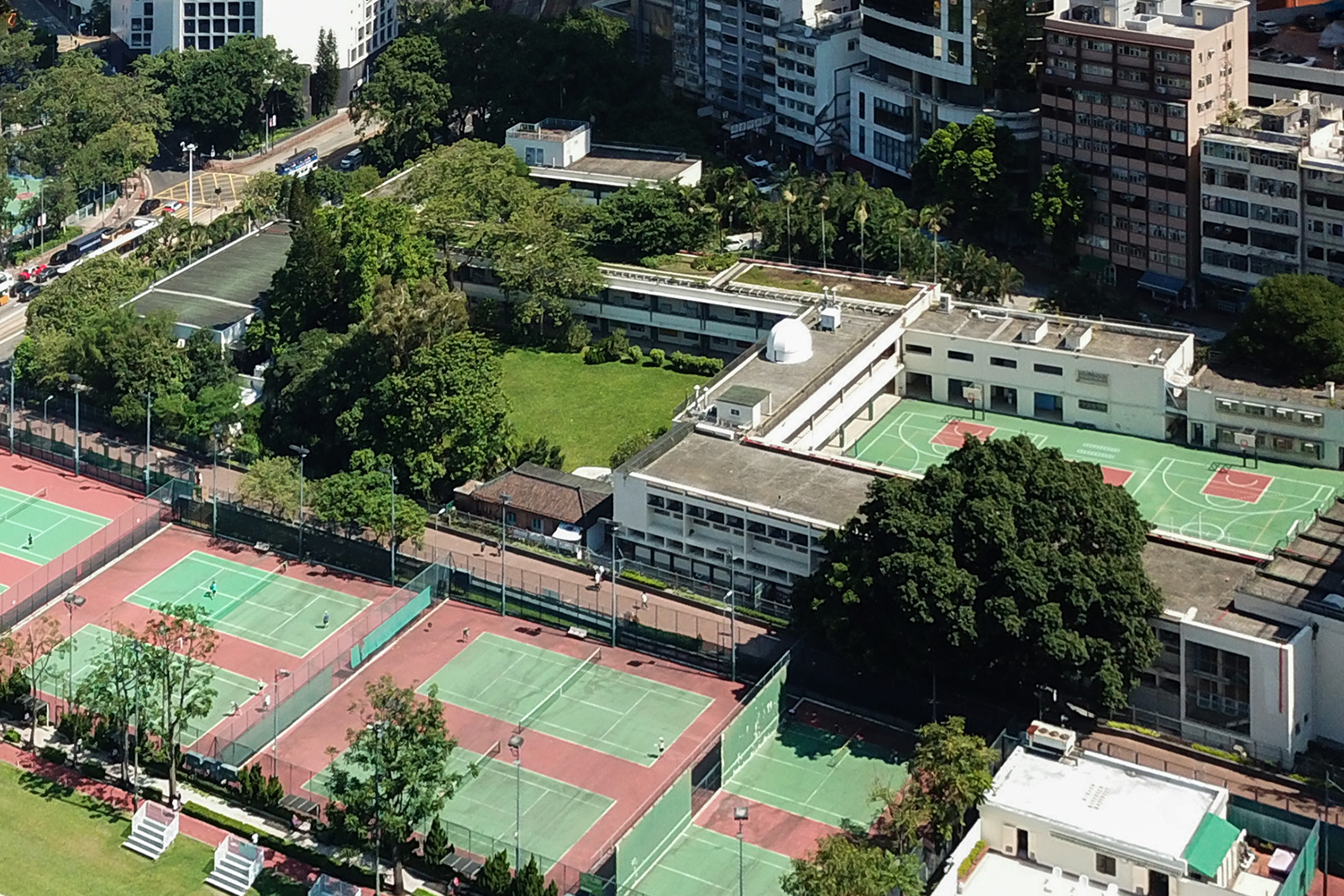
Queen's College

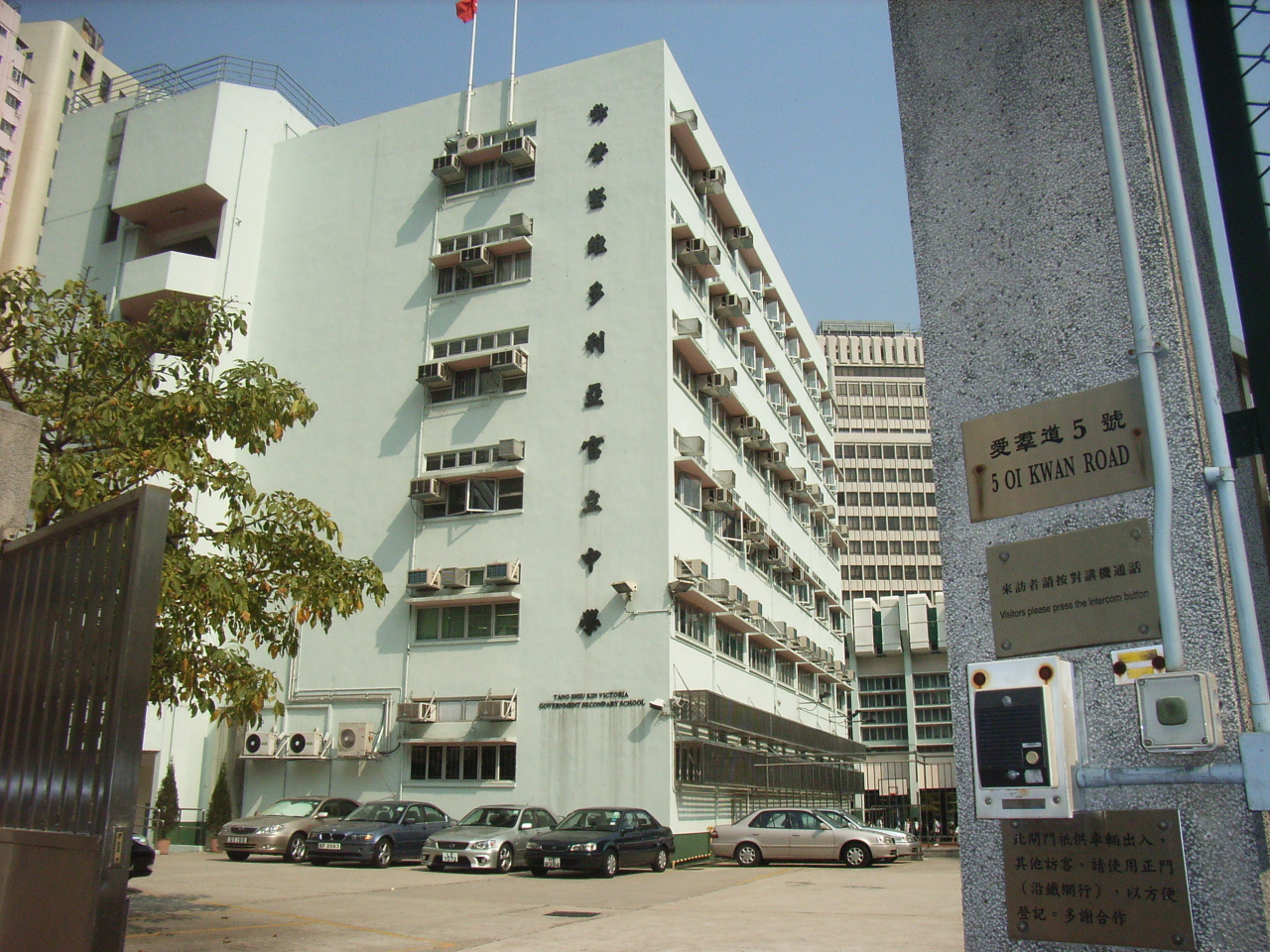
Tang Shiu Kin Victoria Government Secondary School

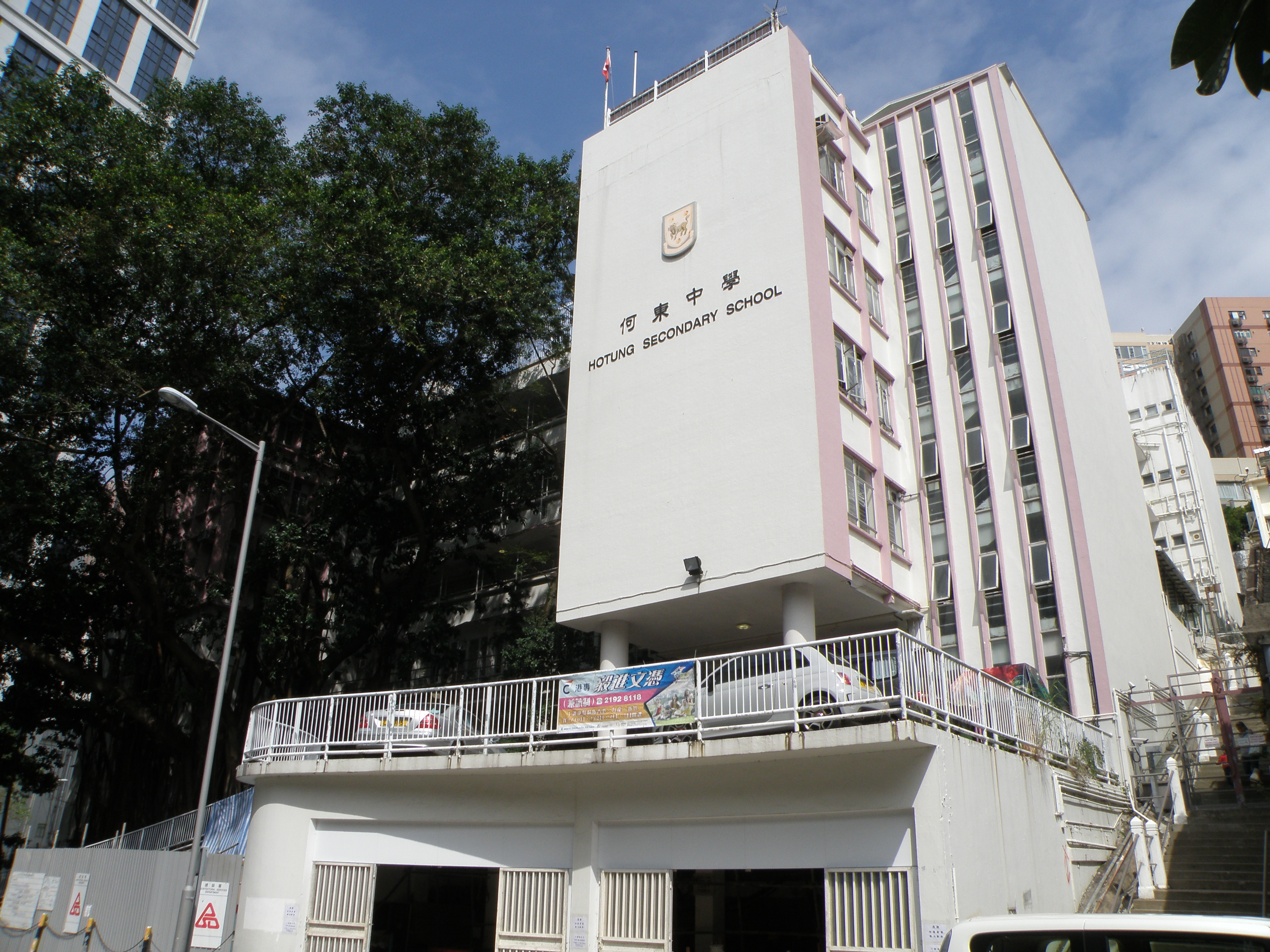
Hotung Secondary School

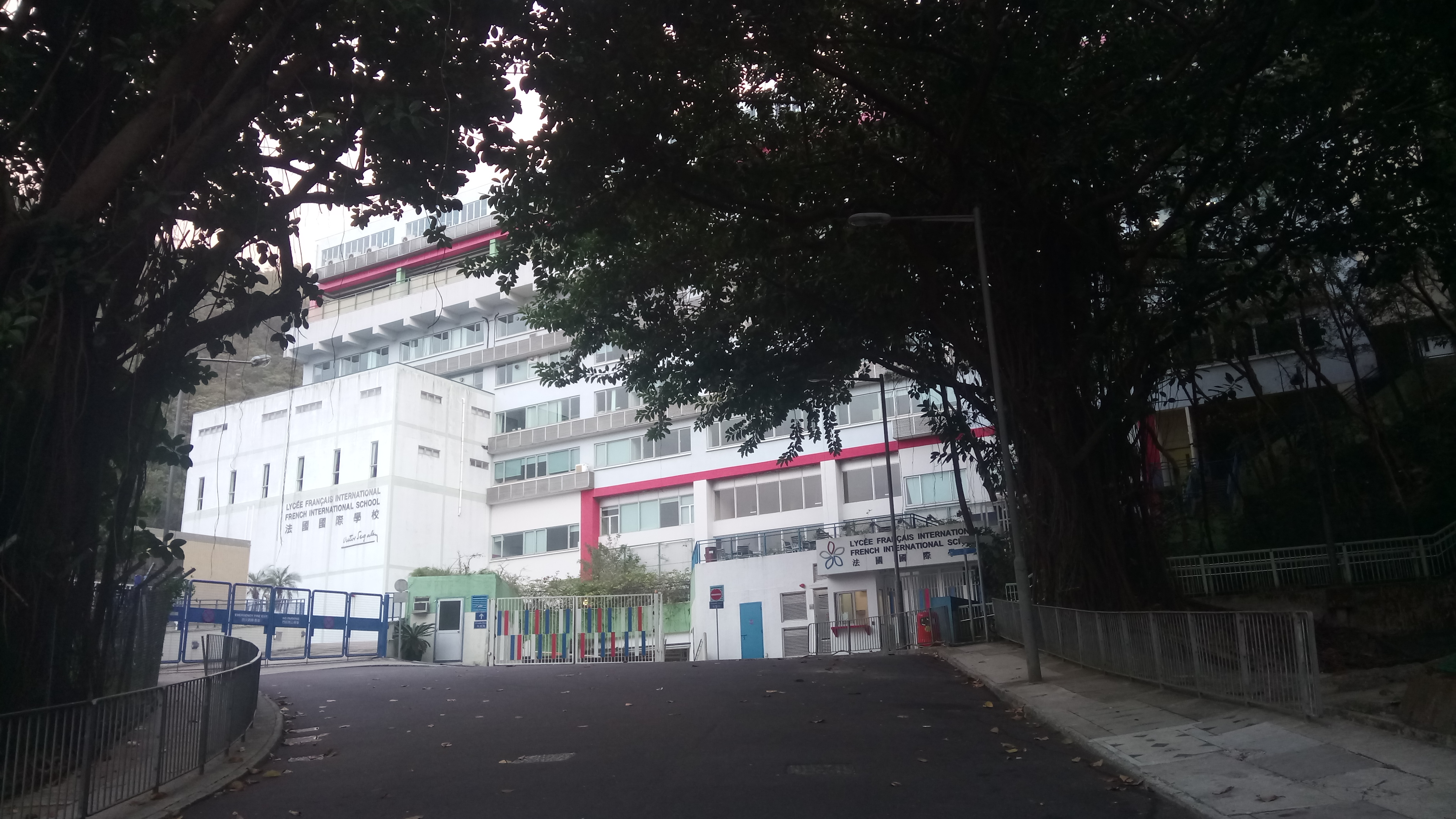
French International School of Hong Kong Blue Pool Road Campus

Government

- Hotung Secondary School (何東中學)
- Queen's College
- Tang Shiu Kin Victoria Government Secondary School

Aided

- Buddhist Wong Fung Ling College
- Concordia Lutheran School - North Point (北角協同中學)
- Hong Kong Tang King Po College (香港鄧鏡波書院)
- Marymount Secondary School
- Rosaryhill Secondary School (玫瑰崗中學)
- SKH Tang Shiu Kin Secondary School
- St Francis' Canossian College
- St Paul's Secondary School
- True Light Middle School of Hong Kong
- TWGH Lee Ching Dea Memorial College (東華三院李潤田紀念中學)
- Wah Yan College, Hong Kong

Direct Subsidy Scheme

- CCC Kung Lee College (中華基督教會公理高中書院)
- Confucius Hall Secondary School (孔聖堂中學)
- St Paul's Convent School (聖保祿學校)

Private

- French International School of Hong Kong
- Hong Kong Japanese School (no upper secondary)

== Primary schools ==
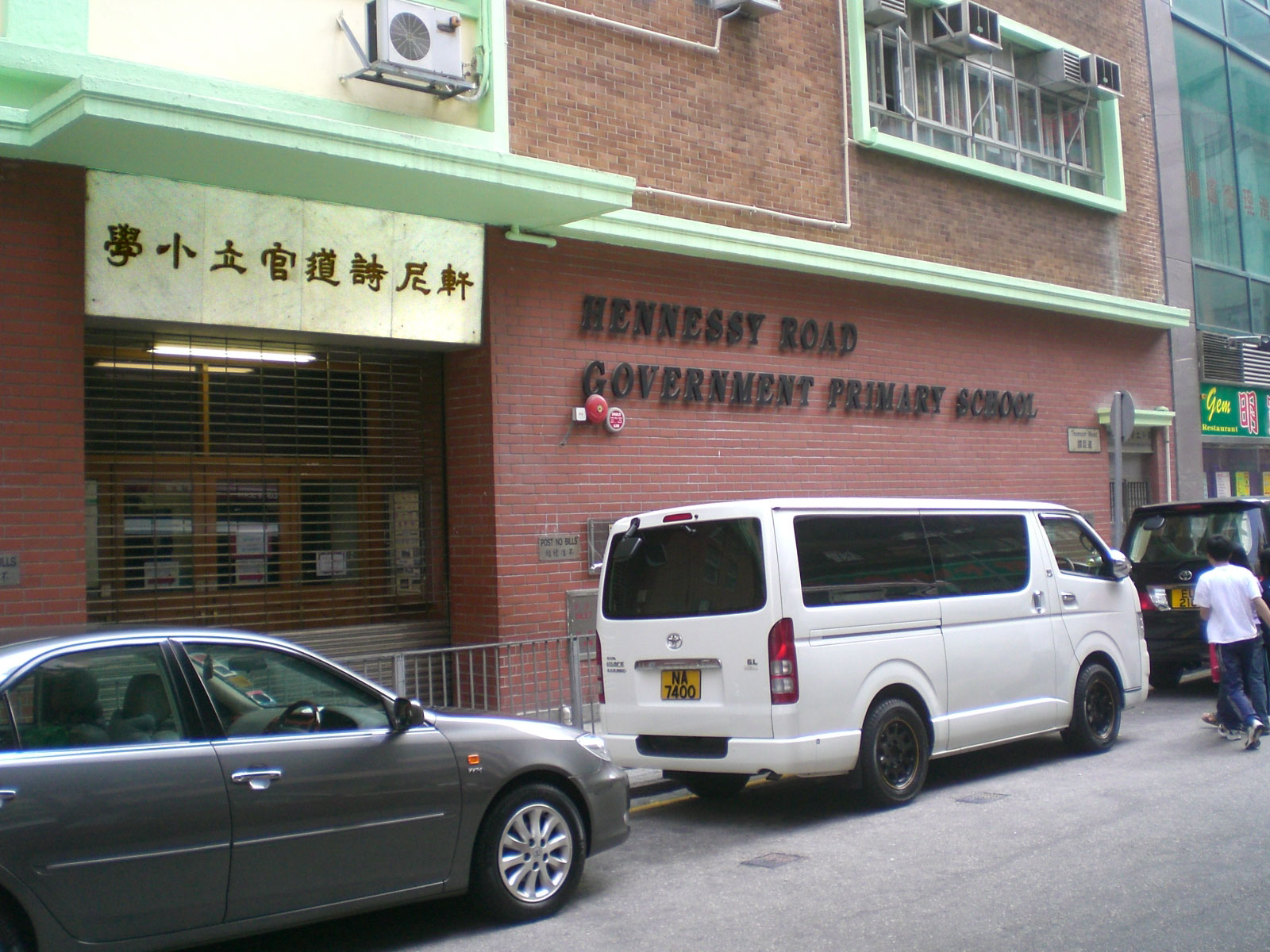
Hennessy Road Government Primary School (軒尼詩道官立小學) in Wan Chai

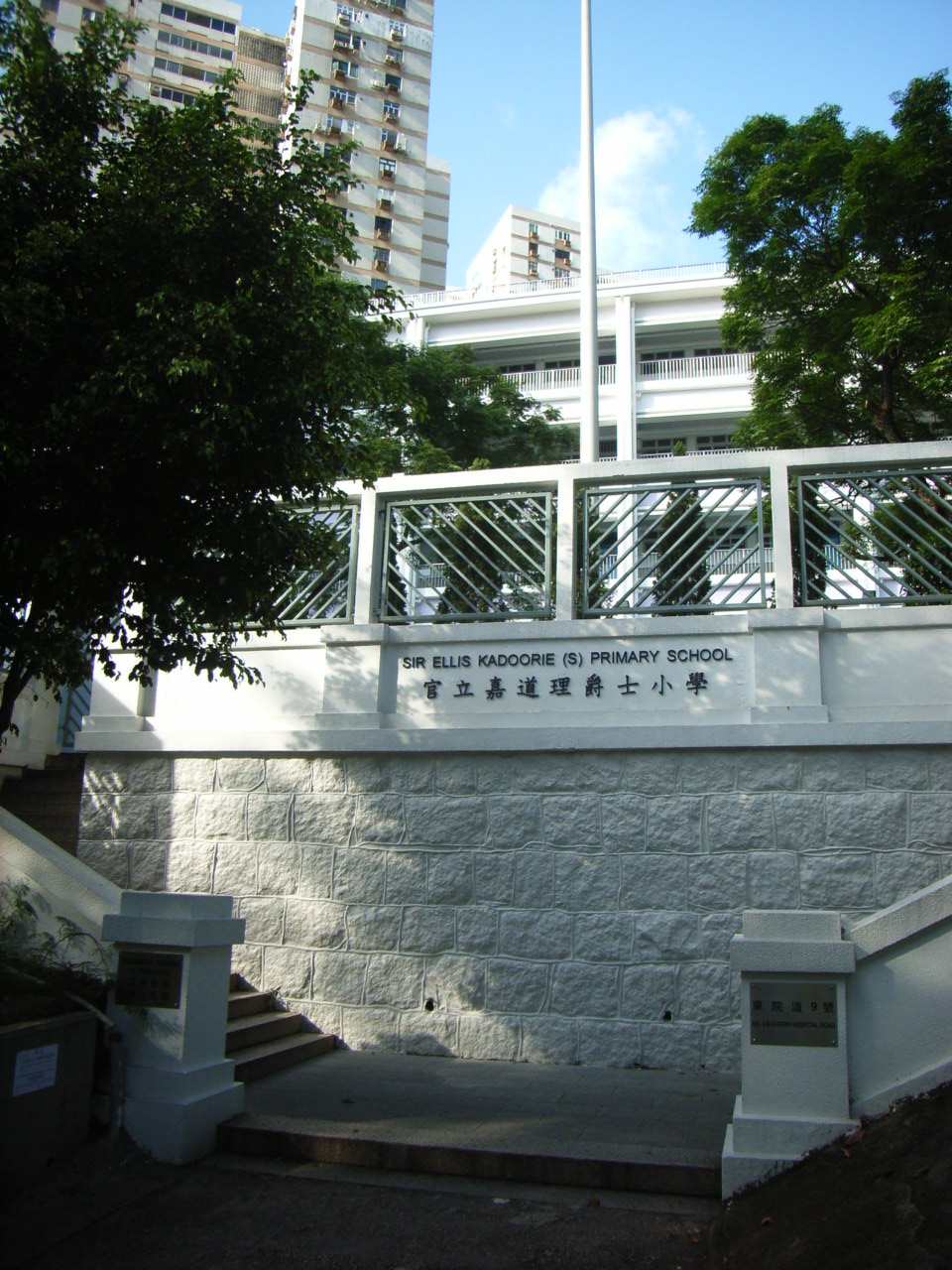
Sir Ellis Kadoorie (S) Primary School in So Kon Po

Government

- Hennessy Road Government Primary School (軒尼詩道官立小學)
- Hennessy Road Government Primary School (Causeway Bay) (軒尼詩道官立小學（銅鑼灣）)
- North Point Government Primary School (Cloud View Road) (北角官立小學（雲景道）)
- Sir Ellis Kadoorie (Sookunpo) Primary School

Aided

- Buffhist Wong Cheuk Um Primary School (佛教黃焯菴小學)
- Li Sing Tai Hang School (李陞大坑學校)
- Marymount Primary School (瑪利曼小學)
- Po Leung Kuk Gold and Silver Exchange Society Pershing Tsang School (保良局金銀業貿易場張凝文學校)
- Po Kok Primary School (寶覺小學)
- Precious Blood Primary School (寶血小學)
- SKH St James' Primary School (聖公會聖雅各小學)
- St Francis' Canossian School (嘉諾撒聖方濟各學校)
- St Joseph's Primary School (聖若瑟小學)
- St Paul's Primary Catholic School (聖保祿天主教小學)
- TWGH Li Chi Ho Primary School (東華三院李賜豪小學)

English Schools Foundation

- Bradbury School (白普理小學)

Private

- Chinese Academy (晉德學校)
- Hong Kong Japanese School
- French International School of Hong Kong
- HKCA Po Leung Kuk School (保良局建造商會學校)
- Raimondi College Primary Section (高主教書院小學部)
- Rosaryhill School (玫瑰崗學校)
- St Paul's Convent School (Primary Section) (聖保祿學校（小學部）)
- True Light Middle School of Hong Kong

== Special schools ==
Aided

- Hong Chi Lions Morninghill School (匡智獅子會晨崗學校)
- Jockey Club Hong Chi School (賽馬會匡智學校)

== Former schools ==
- Hong Kong Sam Yuk Secondary School
- Indonesian School
