= Happy Valley Racecourse fire =

Hong Kong disaster

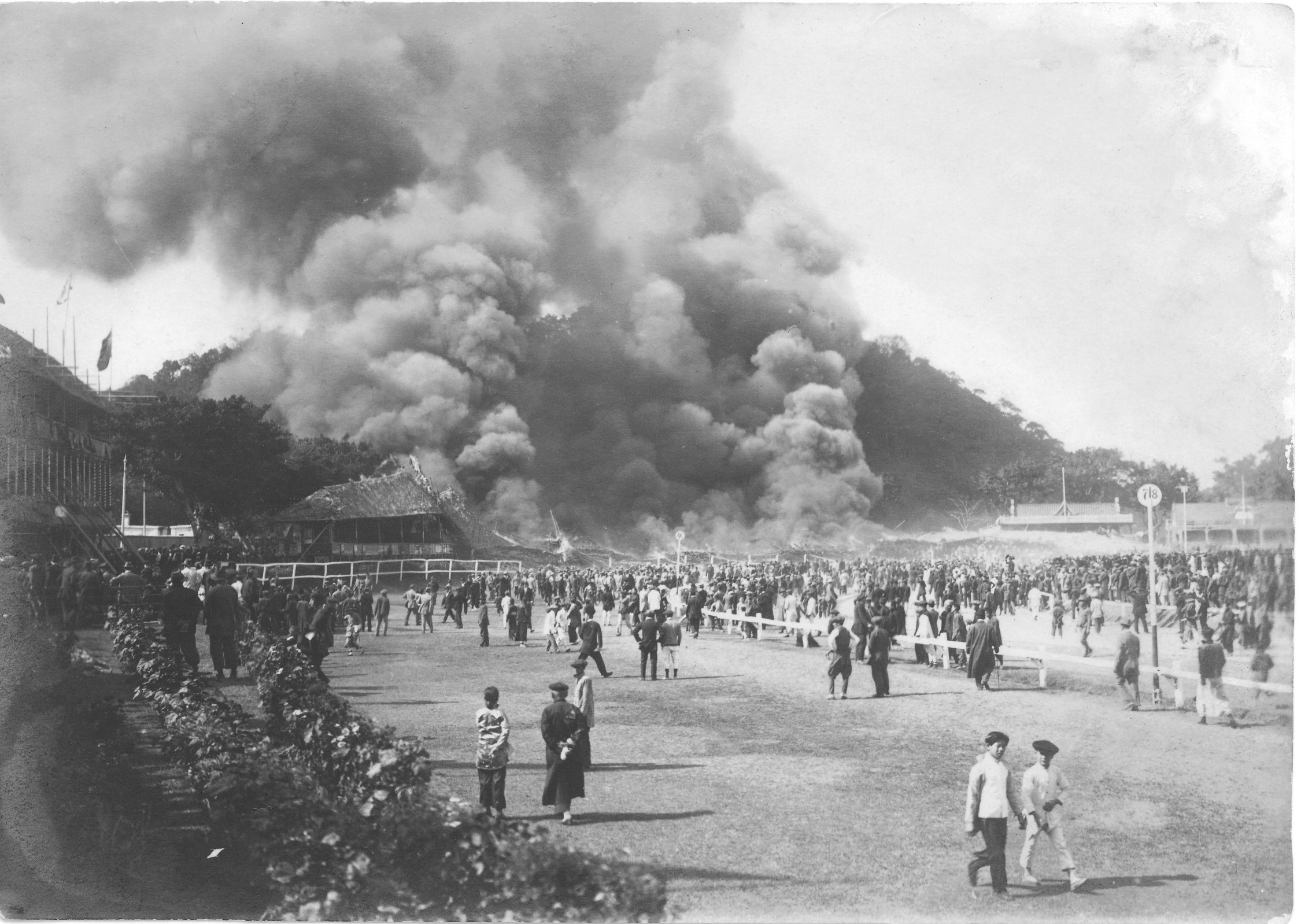
- Date: 26 February 1918
- Time: 15:00 (UTC+8)
- Location: British Hong Kong; 22°16′22″N 114°10′56″E
- Deaths: 670

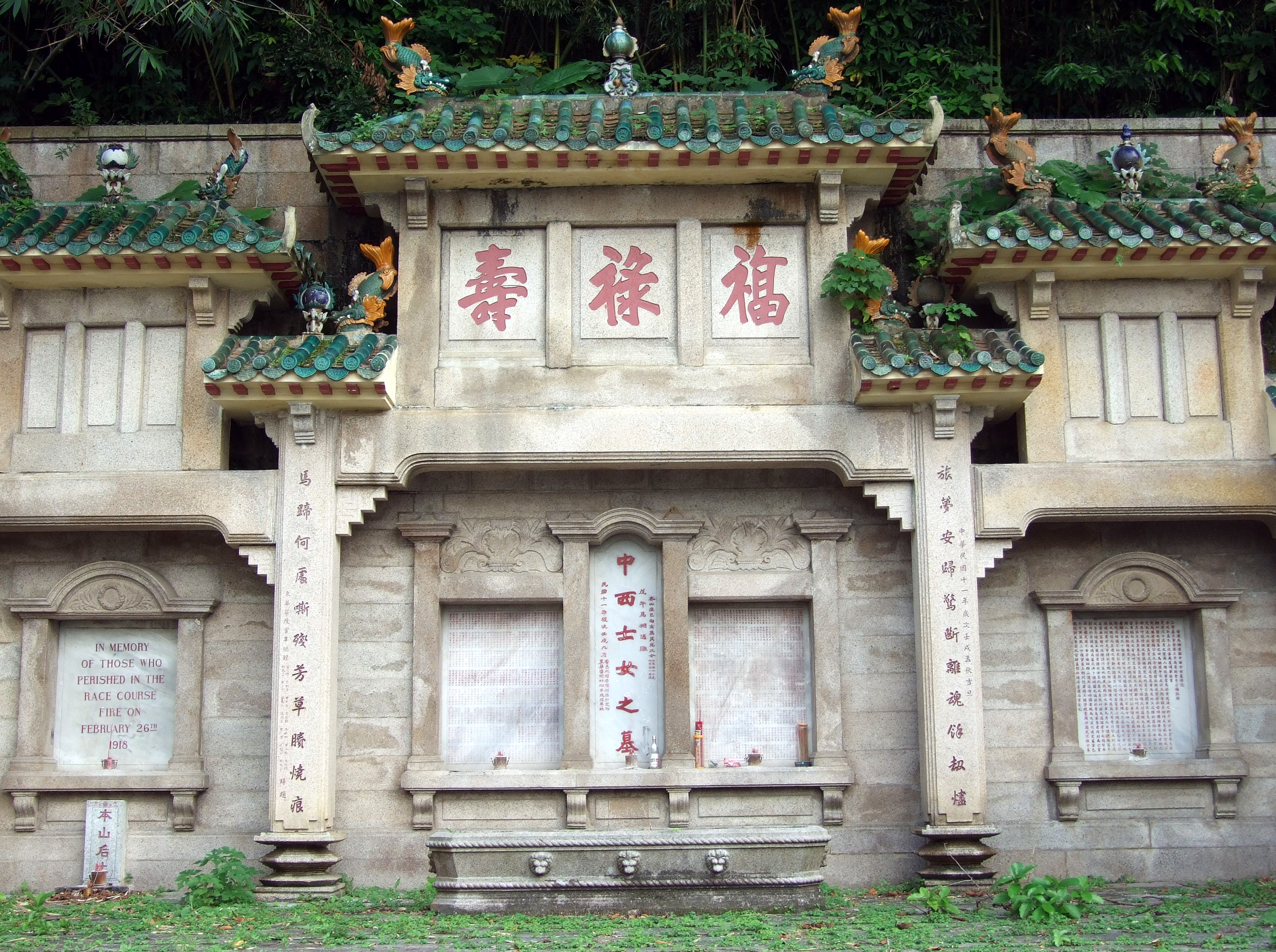
Race Course Fire Memorial

The Happy Valley Racecourse fire (Chinese: 跑馬地馬場大火) took place on 26 February 1918 in the Happy Valley Racecourse located at Happy Valley, British Hong Kong. The catastrophe caused the loss of 670 lives, making it the third deadliest fire in the history of Hong Kong, and one of the deadliest incidents in sporting history. Mainland Chinese sources have often included it among the top ten fires in 20th-century China.

== Background ==
The racecourse was first built in 1845 to provide a facility for horse racing for the British people in Hong Kong. The area was previously swampland, but was also the only flat ground suitable for horse racing on Hong Kong Island. To make way for the racecourse, the Hong Kong government prohibited rice growing by villages in the surrounding area. The first race ran in December 1846. Over the years, horse racing became more and more popular among Chinese residents. Annual "Derby Day" races were held every year in February, and a temporary grandstand was built to accommodate the extra spectators for the event.

== Fire ==
The fire was caused by the collapse of the temporary grandstand on the second day of the event. The collapse knocked over food stalls, which set bamboo matting ablaze. The district's fire department was so stretched that the marine police were called up to help fight the fire. By the next day, as many as 576 confirmed deaths were reported by the Hongkong Telegraph.

== Aftermath ==
Most of the dead bodies became unrecognisable and were assumed to be "Chinese". A total of 614 bodies were officially recovered, however the annual report of Secretary for Chinese Affairs finally confirmed 670 dead in the disaster.

The nearby Tung Wah Hospital was one of the first to offer assistance and after the fire arranged for labourers to collect the dead. They were buried in the nearby So Kon Po area (now the site of Hong Kong Stadium). A Chinese-styled memorial site known as Race Course Fire Memorial was built in the Chinese cemetery (now behind the east stand of the stadium) in 1922 in So Kon Po. The memorial was declared a monument in 2015.

== See also ==
- List of fires in China
- List of building or structure fires

== Bibliography ==
Notes

References

- Antiquities and Monuments Office (2018). "Declared Monuments in Hong Kong - Hong Kong Island". Antiquities and Monuments Office. Archived from the original on October 31, 2019.
- Bard, Solomon (2002). Voices from the Past: Hong Kong, 1842-1918. Hong Kong University Press. ISBN 9789622095748. - Total pages: 383
- Government of Hong Kong (October 23, 2015). "Three historic buildings declared monuments". Government of Hong Kong.
- Ward, Iain (1991). Sui Geng: The Hong Kong Marine Police 1841-1950. Hong Kong University Press. ISBN 9789622092860. - Total pages: 236
