= List of government schools in Hong Kong =

This is a list of primary and secondary schools directly operated by the government of Hong Kong.

== Hong Kong Island and Islands District ==
Central and Western District

- King's College (secondary)
- Bonham Road Government Primary School
- Li Sing Primary School (李陞小學)

Eastern District

- Belilios Public School (secondary)
- Clementi Secondary School
- Shau Kei Wan East Government Secondary School
- Shau Kei Wan Government Secondary School
- Aldrich Bay Government Primary School (愛秩序灣官立小學)
- North Point Government Primary School (北角官立小學)
- Shau Kei Wan Government Primary School (筲箕灣官立小學)
  - Formerly spelled Shaukiwan Government Primary School

Islands District

- Cheung Chau Government Secondary School (長洲官立中學)

Southern District

- Hong Kong Southern District Government Primary School (香港南區官立小學)
- Island Road Government Primary School (香島道官立小學)

Wan Chai District

- Hotung Secondary School (何東中學)
- Queen's College (secondary)
- Tang Shiu Kin Victoria Government Secondary School
- Hennessy Road Government Primary School (軒尼詩道官立小學)
- Hennessy Road Government Primary School (Causeway Bay) (軒尼詩道官立小學（銅鑼灣）)
- North Point Government Primary School (Cloud View Road) (北角官立小學（雲景道）)
- Sir Ellis Kadoorie (Sookunpo) Primary School

== Kowloon ==
Kowloon City District

- Arts & Technology Education Centre (藝術與科技教育中心) (secondary)
- Homantin Government Secondary School (何文田官立中學)
- Jockey Club Government Secondary School (賽馬會官立中學)
- Farm Road Government Primary School (農圃道官立小學)
- Kowloon Tong Government Primary School (九龍塘官立小學)
- Ma Tau Chung Government Primary School (馬頭涌官立小學)
- Ma Tau Chung Government Primary School (Hung Hom Bay) (馬頭涌官立小學（紅磡灣）)

Kwun Tong District

- Kwun Tong Government Secondary School (觀塘官立中學)
- Kwun Tong Kung Lok Government Secondary School (觀塘功樂官立中學)
- Kwun Tong Government Primary School (Sau Ming Road) (觀塘官立小學〈秀明道〉)
- Kwun Tong Government Primary School (觀塘官立小學)

Sai Kung District

- Tseung Kwan O Government Secondary School (將軍澳官立中學)
- Tseung Kwan O Government Primary School (將軍澳官立小學)

Sham Shui Po District

- Kowloon Technical School (九龍工業學校)
- Fuk Wing Street Government Primary School (福榮街官立小學)
- Li Cheng Uk Government Primary School (李鄭屋官立小學)
  - In 1994 it had significant numbers of students with origins from India and the Philippines.
- Sham Shui Po Government Primary School (深水埗官立小學)

Wong Tai Sin District

- Lung Cheung Government Secondary School
- Wong Tai Sin Government Primary School (黃大仙官立小學)
  - Formerly spelled Wongtaisin Government Primary School

Yau Tsim Mong District

- Queen Elizabeth School (secondary)
- Sir Ellis Kadoorie Secondary School (West Kowloon)
- Canton Road Government Primary School (廣東道官立小學)
- Jordan Road Government Primary School (佐敦道官立小學)
- Tong Mei Road Government Primary School (塘尾道官立小學)

== New Territories ==
North District

- Fanling Government Secondary School (粉嶺官立中學)
- Sheung Shui Government Secondary School
- Fanling Government Primary School (粉嶺官立小學)

Sha Tin District

- Helen Liang Memorial Secondary School (Shatin) (secondary)
- Sha Tin Government Secondary School
- Sha Tin Government Primary School (沙田官立小學)

Tai Po District

- New Territories Heung Yee Kuk Tai Po District Secondary School
- Tai Po Government Primary School (大埔官立小學)

Tsuen Wan District

- Tsuen Wan Government Secondary School
- Hoi Pa Street Government Primary School (海壩街官立小學)
- Tsuen Wan Government Primary School (荃灣官立小學)

Tuen Mun District

- South Tuen Mun Government Secondary School (南屯門官立中學)
- Tuen Mun Government Secondary School
- Tuen Mun Government Primary School (屯門官立小學)

Yuen Long District

- Chiu Lut Sau Memorial Secondary School
- New Territories Heung Yee Kuk Yuen Long District Secondary School
- Tin Shui Wai Government Secondary School
- Yuen Long Public Secondary School
- South Yuen Long Government Primary School (南元朗官立小學)
- Tin Shui Wai Government Primary School (天水圍官立小學)
- Yuen Long Government Primary School (元朗官立小學)

== Former schools ==
Former secondary schools:

- Ha Kwai Chung Government Secondary School (下葵涌官立中學)
- NTHYK Southern District Secondary School (新界鄉議局南約區中學) - Mui Wo
- Sheung Kwai Chung Government Secondary School (上葵涌官立中學)
- Tai Po Government Secondary School
- Sha Tau Kok Government Secondary School

Former primary schools:

- Chai Wan Government Primary School - Hong Kong Island
- Hollywood Road Government Primary School - Hong Kong Island
- Hung Hom Government Primary School - Later used as the Kowloon Junior School Hung Hom Campus, and the French International School of Hong Kong Hung Hom Campus.
- Java Road Government Primary School
- Jockey Club Government Primary School - Hong Kong Island
- Pokfulam Government Primary School - Now the German Swiss International School Pok Fu Lam Campus.
- Sha Tau Kok Government Primary School - New Territories
- Shek Kip Mei Government Primary School - Kowloon
