= New Territories Heung Yee Kuk Tai Po District Secondary School =

Secondary school in Hong Kong

Coordinates: 22.4560°N 114.1676°E

- Chinese: 新界鄉議局大埔區中學
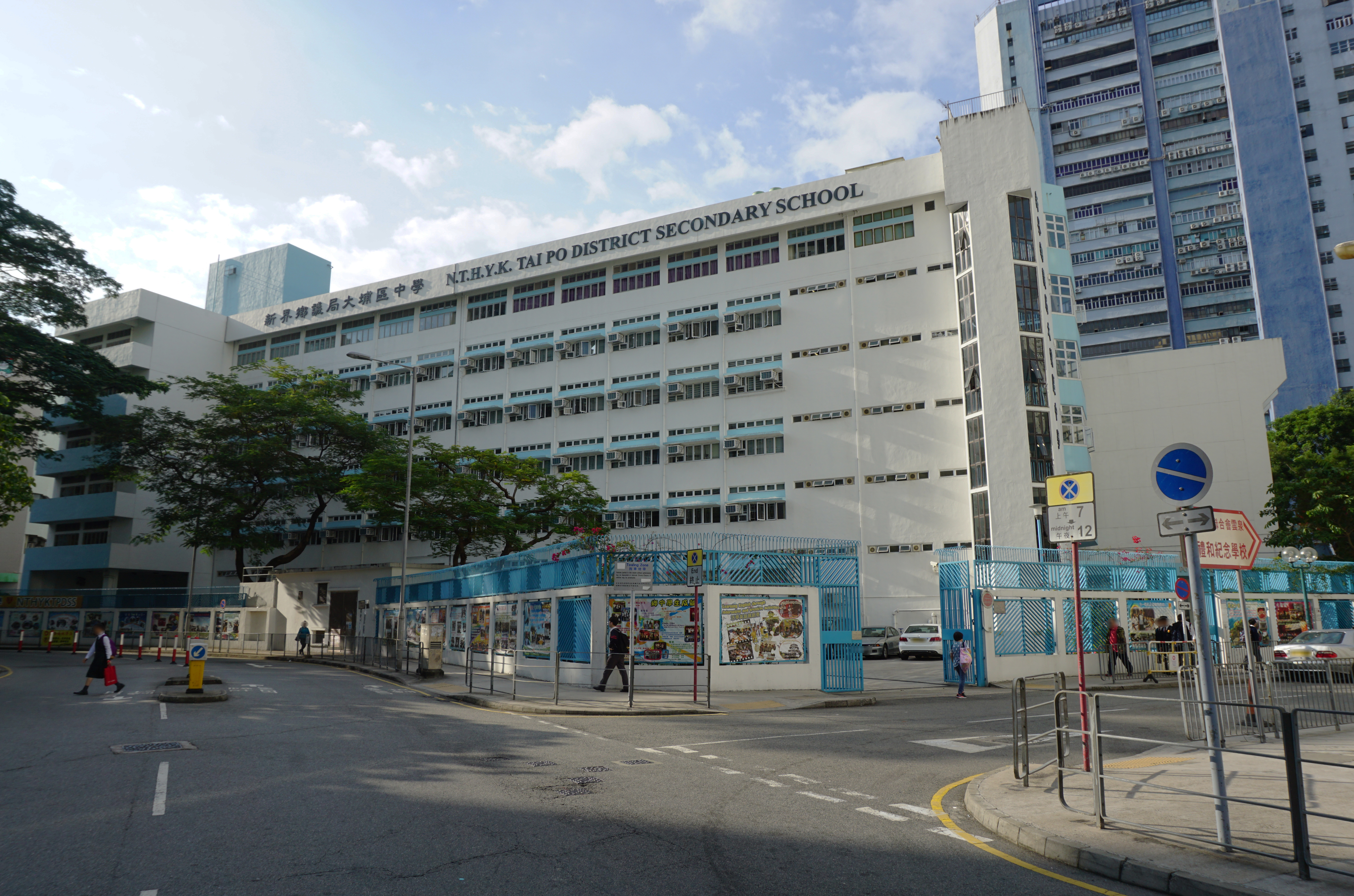

Information
- Enrollment: 997 (1984)
- Average class size: 40

New Territories Heung Yee Kuk Tai Po District Secondary School (Chinese: 新界鄉議局大埔區中學) is a government secondary school on Ting Kok Road in Tai Po, Tai Po District, Hong Kong.

It has a 5,500-square-metre (59,000 sq ft) property with a classroom building with six storeys.

== History ==
New Territories Heung Yee Kuk Tai Po District Secondary School
- Traditional Chinese: 新界鄉議局大埔區中學
- Simplified Chinese: 新界乡议局大埔区中学
- Cantonese Yale: sān gaai hēung yíh guhk daaih bou kēui jūng hohk
Transcriptions
Standard Mandarin
- Hanyu Pinyin: Xīnjiè Xiāng Yì Jú Dàbùqū Zhōngxué
Yue: Cantonese
- Yale Romanization: sān gaai hēung yíh guhk daaih bou kēui jūng hohk
- Jyutping: san1 gaai3 hoeng1 ji5 guk6 daai6 bou3 keoi1 zung1 hok6

In 1984 it had 997 students. The average class size was 40.

It began a beautification and cleanliness programme circa 1993 to improve the learning environment.

== Operations ==
As of 1993 it periodically has an "open day" where students from other Tai Po District schools see displays of the students enrolled at NTHYK Tai Po Secondary.

== See also ==
- List of government schools in Hong Kong
- List of schools in Tai Po District
- List of secondary schools in Hong Kong
