= So Kon Po =

So Kon Po 掃桿埔
- Suburb
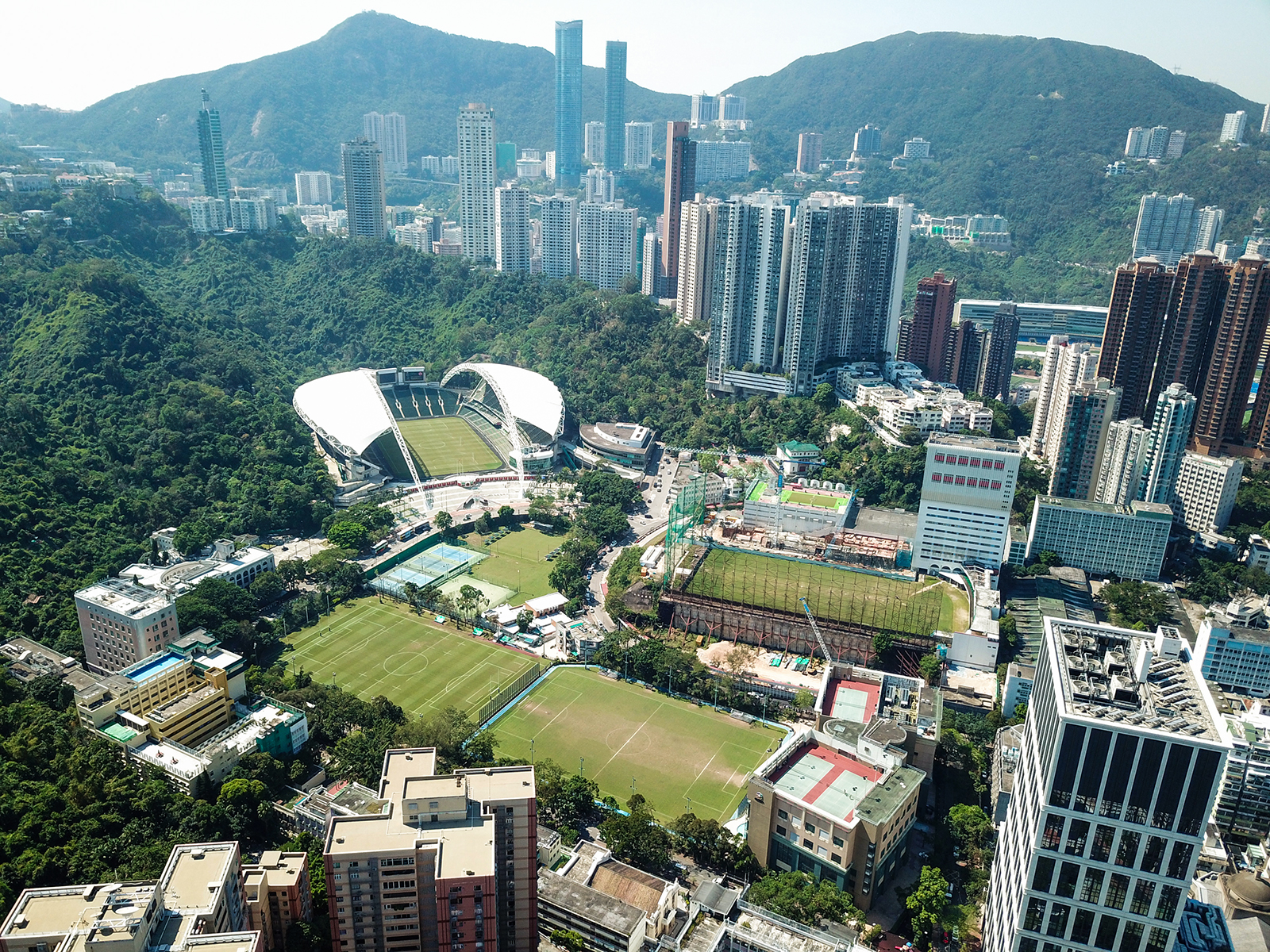
- Entrance to Hong Kong Stadium at Eastern Hospital Road.
- Interactive map of So Kon Po
- Coordinates: 22.27414°N 114.18937°E
- Country: China
- SAR: Hong Kong
- District: Wan Chai District

So Kon Po
- Traditional Chinese: 掃桿埔
- Simplified Chinese: 扫杆埔
- Cantonese Yale: Sougōnbou
Transcriptions
Standard Mandarin
- Hanyu Pinyin: Sǎogǎnpǔ
- IPA: [sǎʊ.kǎn.pʰù]
Wu
- Wugniu: su^{3} koe^{1} phu^{5}
- IPA: Shanghainese: [su˧ kø˦ pʰu˨]
Yue: Cantonese
- Yale Romanization: Sougōnbou
- Jyutping: Sou^{3} gon^{1} bou^{3}
- IPA: [sɔw˧.kɔn˥.pɔw˧]

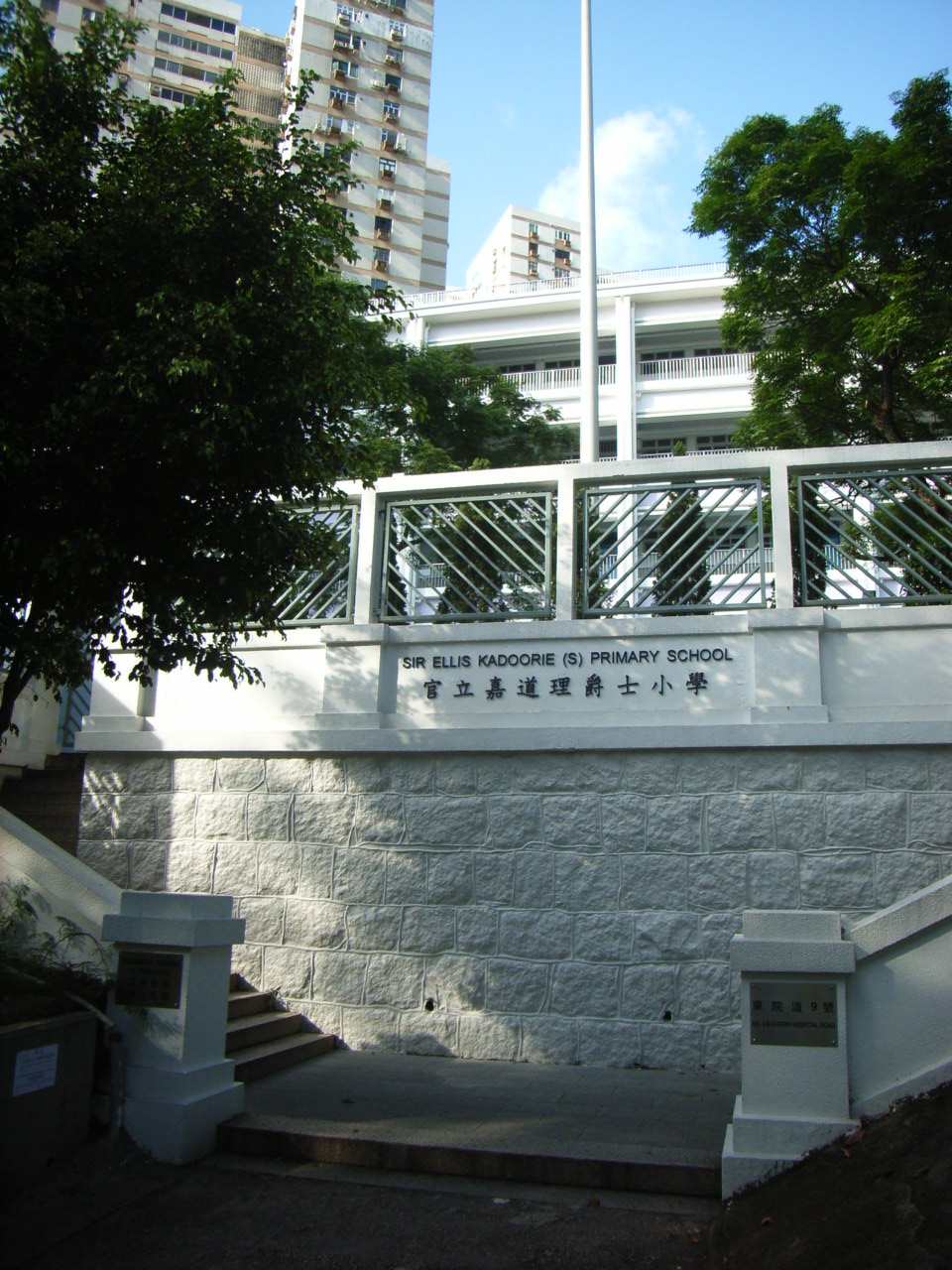
Sir Ellis Kadoorie (Sookunpo) Primary School (Chinese: 官立嘉道理爵士小學)

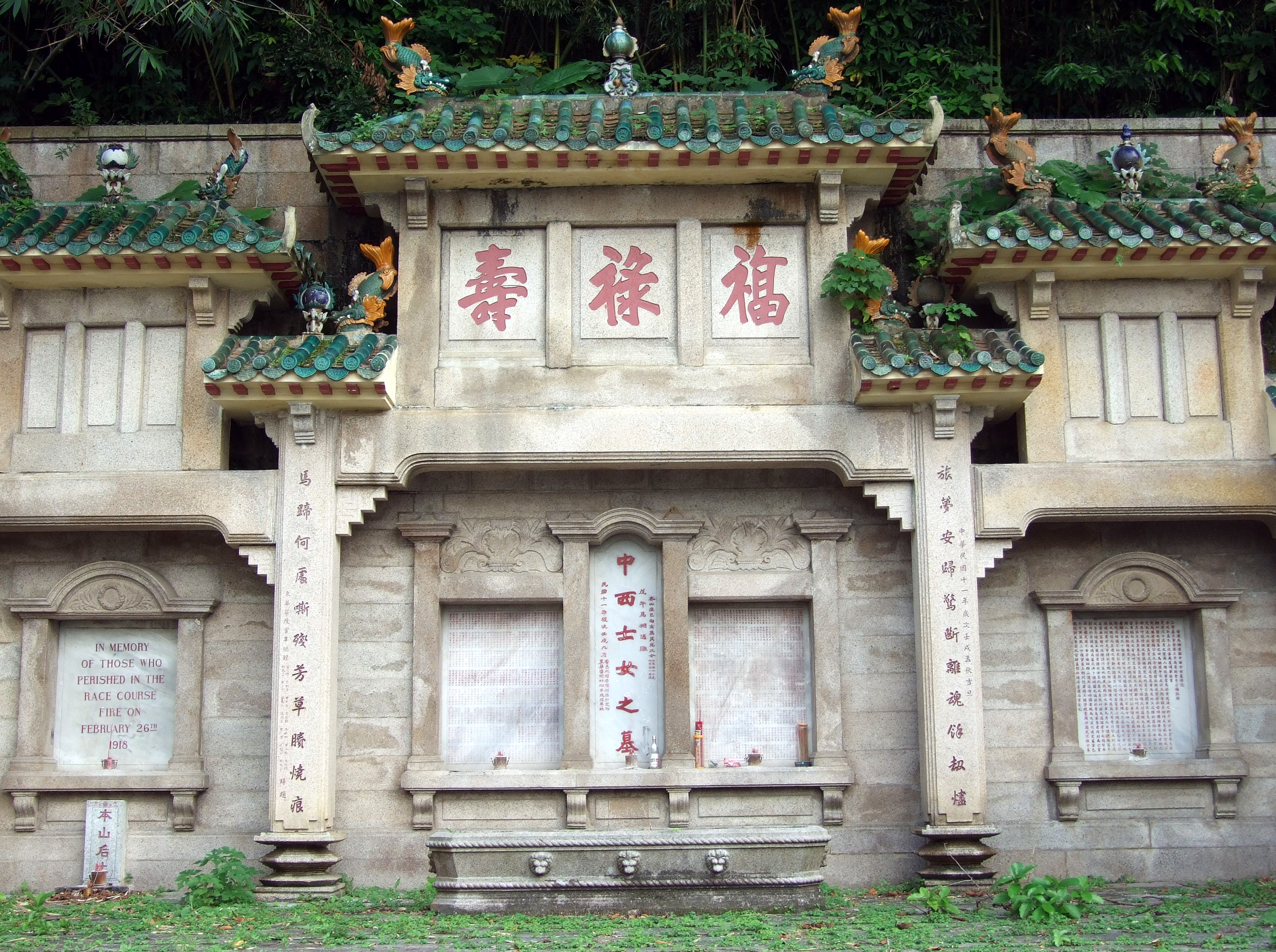
Happy Valley Racecourse Fire memorial.

So Kon Po or Sookunpo (Chinese: 掃桿埔) is an area of Hong Kong Island located south of Causeway Bay and Victoria Park in Hong Kong. It neighbours Caroline Hill and Jardine's Lookout.

== Features ==
It contains the Hong Kong Stadium, Olympic House, and the Tung Wah Eastern Hospital. So Kon Po was the burial grounds for the victims of the Happy Valley Racecourse fire in 1918. The remains were moved to Aberdeen in 1953, when the stadium was built on its grounds.

== Caroline Hill ==
The actual Caroline Hill is not visible beyond than the noticeable rise of roads around it. Prior to 1920s the hill had been occupied by Captain William Morgan's Bungalow built in the 1840s but had been demolished by the early 1900s.

The north end is occupied by the South China Athletic Association (SCAA) facilities including the South China AA Stadium built in 1953. The SCAA has been occupying this site since the 1920s. The southern end was a government building (used by Highway Department) and now being replaced by the District Court project which will re-located the Wan Chai Courts to this location. The tennis courts on the south end are being redeveloped as a commercial site.

== Education ==
The Hong Kong government-operated Sir Ellis Kadoorie (Sookunpo) Primary School is located in So Kon Po. It was formerly both a primary and secondary school. In 1980 the Kadoorie School was divided into separate schools for primary and secondary levels. Sir Ellis Kadoorie Secondary School (West Kowloon) opened in 2000, taking secondary levels. Kadoorie School previously had separate shifts in the morning and afternoon.

So Kon Po is in Primary One Admission (POA) School Net 12. Within the school net are multiple aided schools (operated independently but funded with government money) and the following government schools: Sir Ellis Kadoorie (S) Primary School and Hennessy Road Government Primary School (Chinese: 軒尼詩道官立小學).
