= The Race Course Fire Memorial =

Hong Kong monument

Coordinates: 22.272749°N 114.189965°E

- 馬場先難友紀念碑
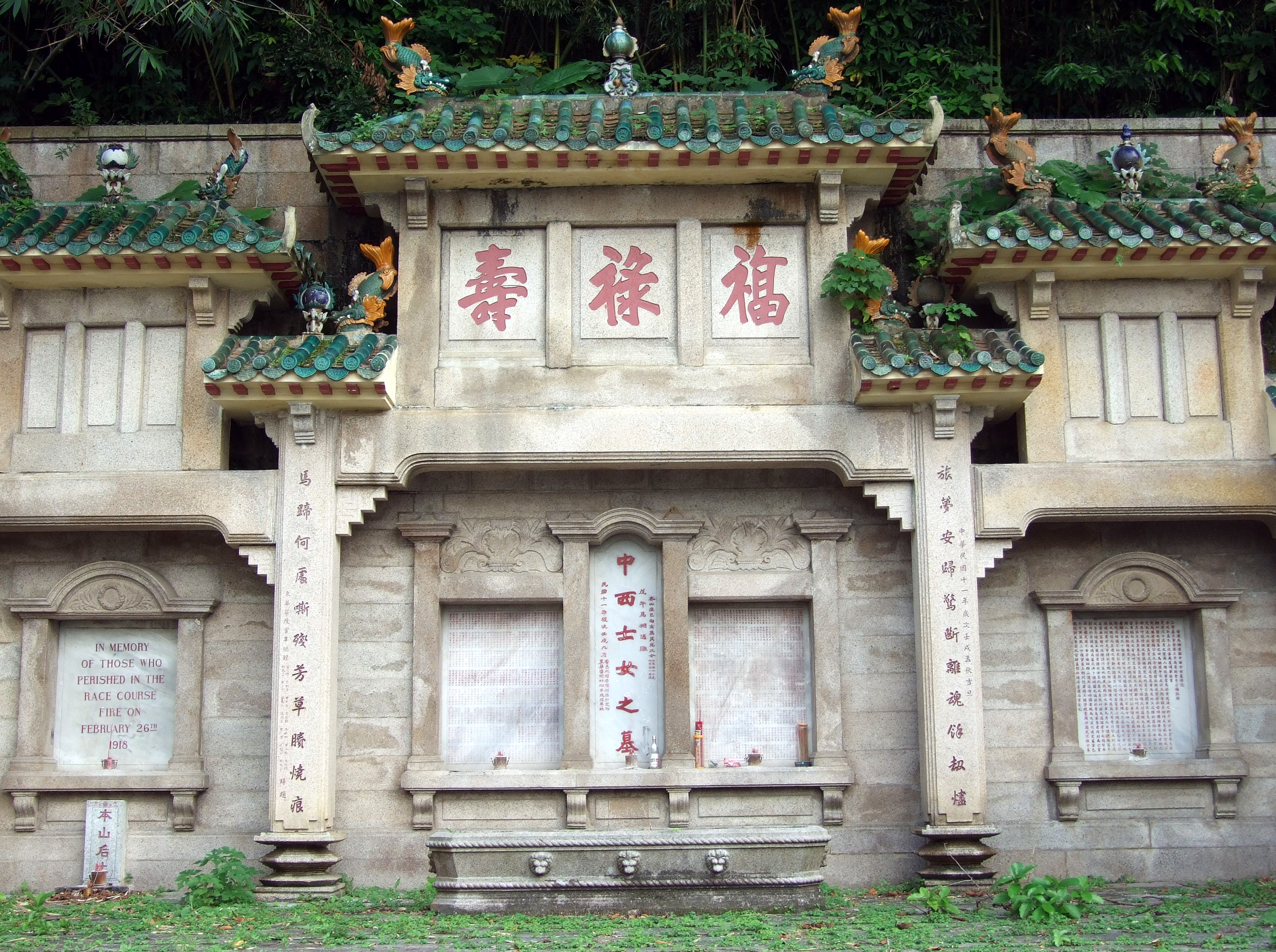
- The front facade of the memorial
- Interactive map of The Race Course Fire Memorial
- Location: So Kon Po, Wan Chai, Hong Kong
- Completion date: 1922
- Dedicated to: Victims of the 1918 Happy Valley Racecourse fire.
- Website: Official website

The Race Course Fire Memorial
- Traditional Chinese: 馬場先難友紀念碑
- Simplified Chinese: 马场先难友纪念碑
Transcriptions
Standard Mandarin
- Hanyu Pinyin: Mǎchǎng Xiānnàn Yǒujìniànbēi
Yue: Cantonese
- Yale Romanization: Máh chèuhng sīn naahn yáuh géi nihm bēi
- Jyutping: Maa5 coeng4 sin1 naan6 jau5 gei2 nim6 bei1

The Race Course Fire Memorial is a Hong Kong monument erected in memory to those who were killed in the Happy Valley Racecourse fire on 26 February 1918. The memorial was completed in 1922, and is currently managed by the Tung Wah Group of Hospitals. It is located next to Hong Kong Stadium. The site was added to the list of declared monuments by the Antiquities and Monuments Office in 2015.

In 2018-2019, the memorial was inaccessible because the only road leading to it was damaged by fallen trees during the Typhoon Mangkhut. The memorial is open 8am-12pm and 1pm-4pm daily, except for the first three days of the Lunar New Year.

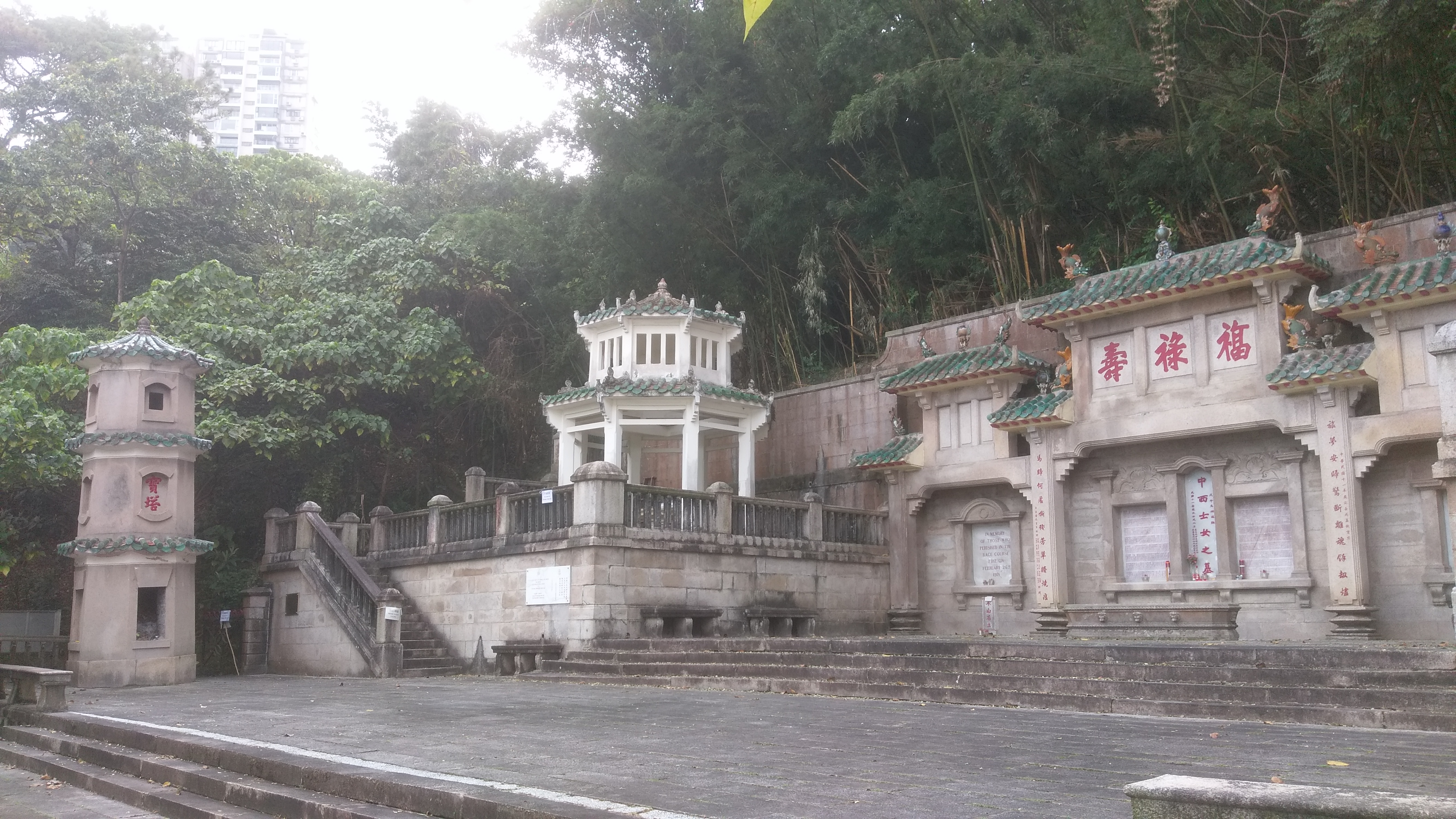

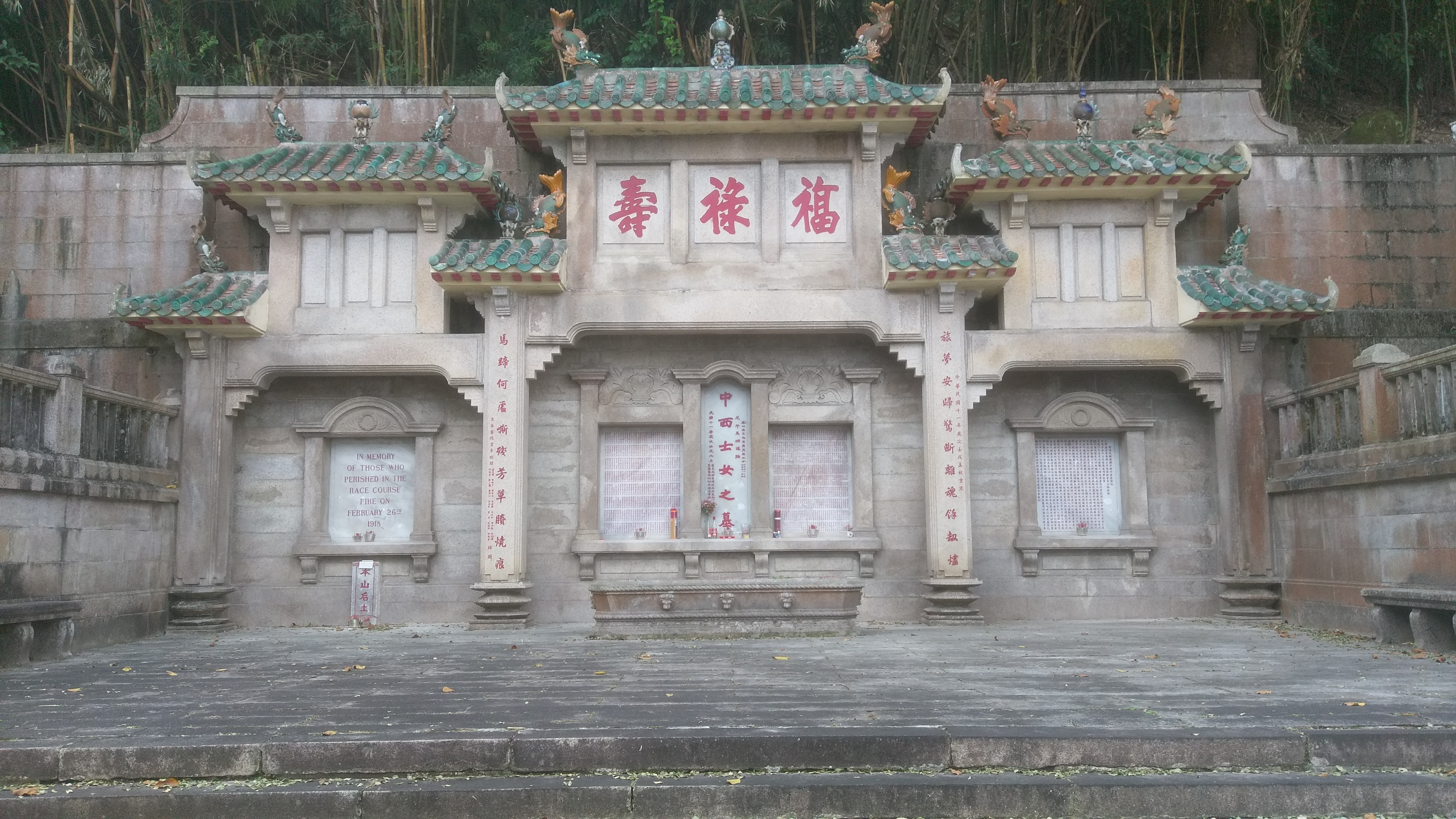

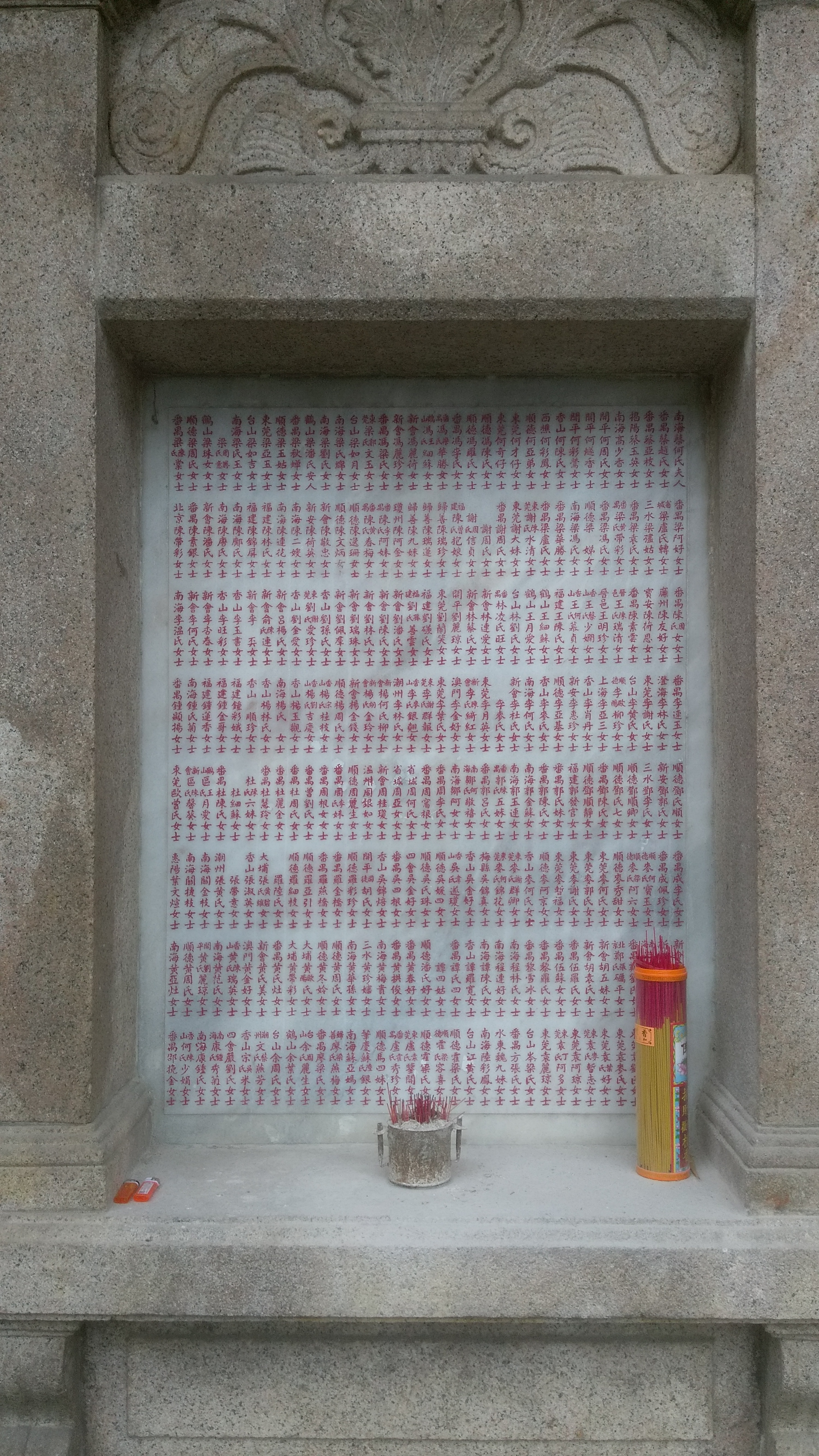

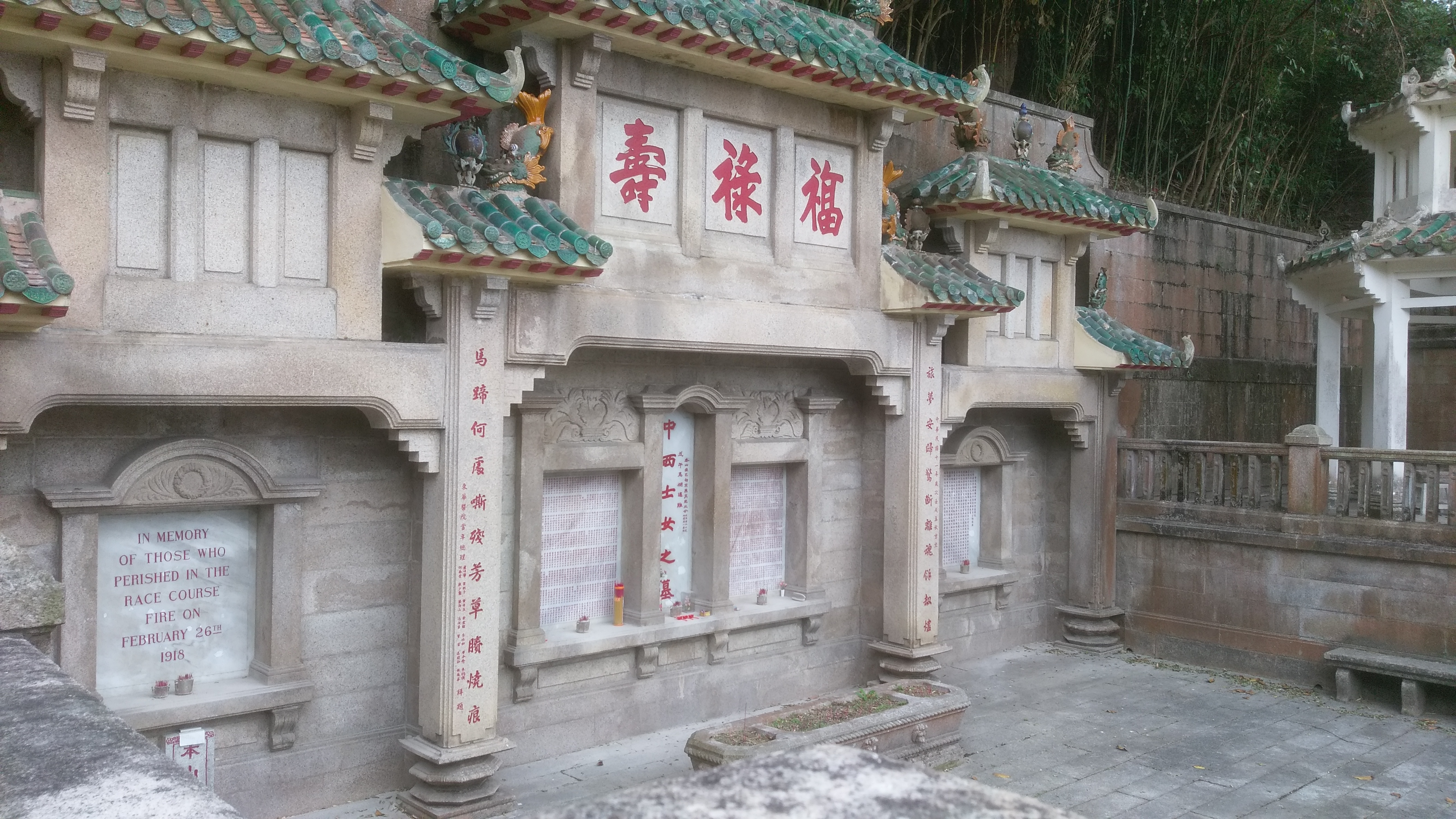

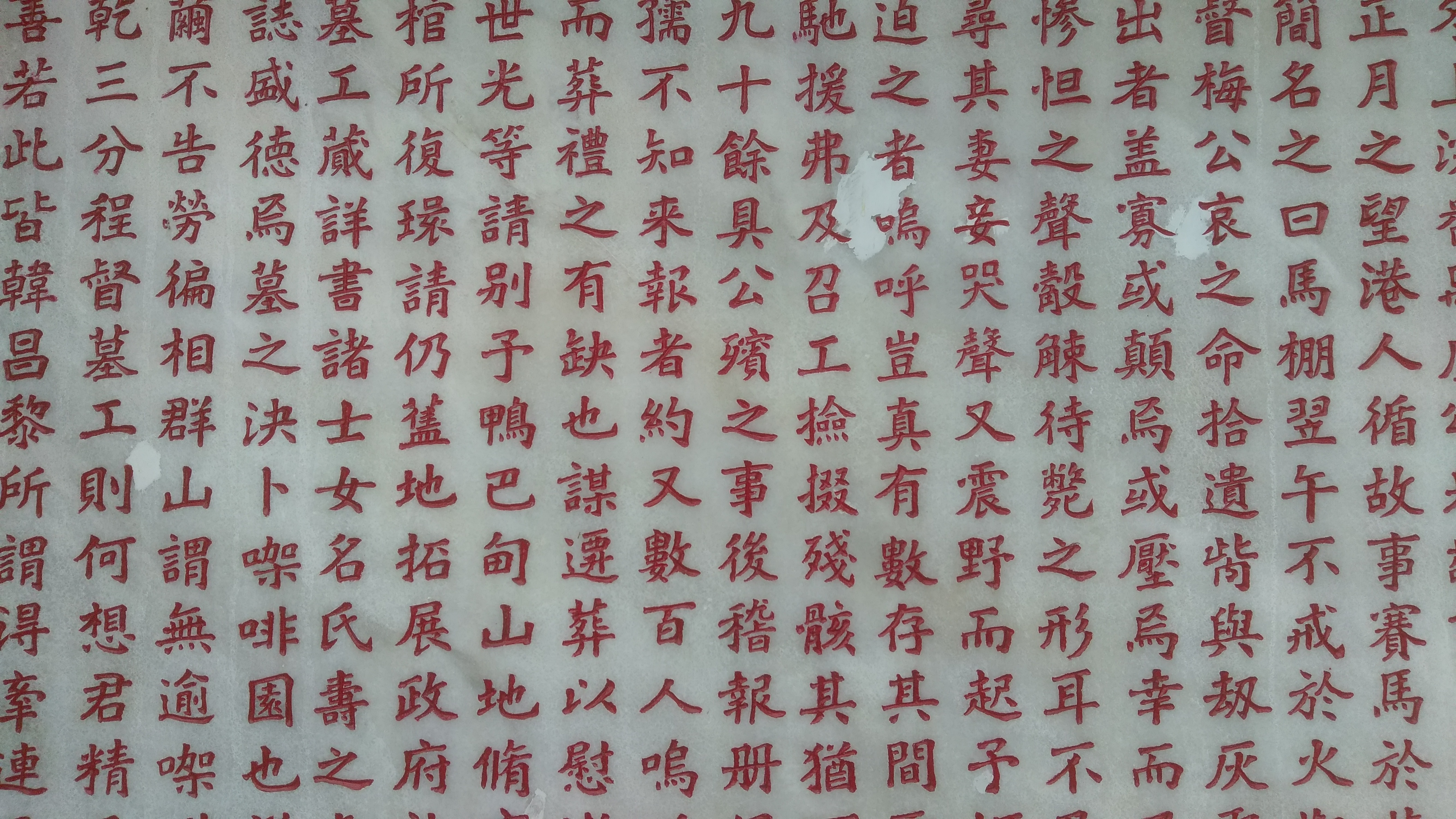

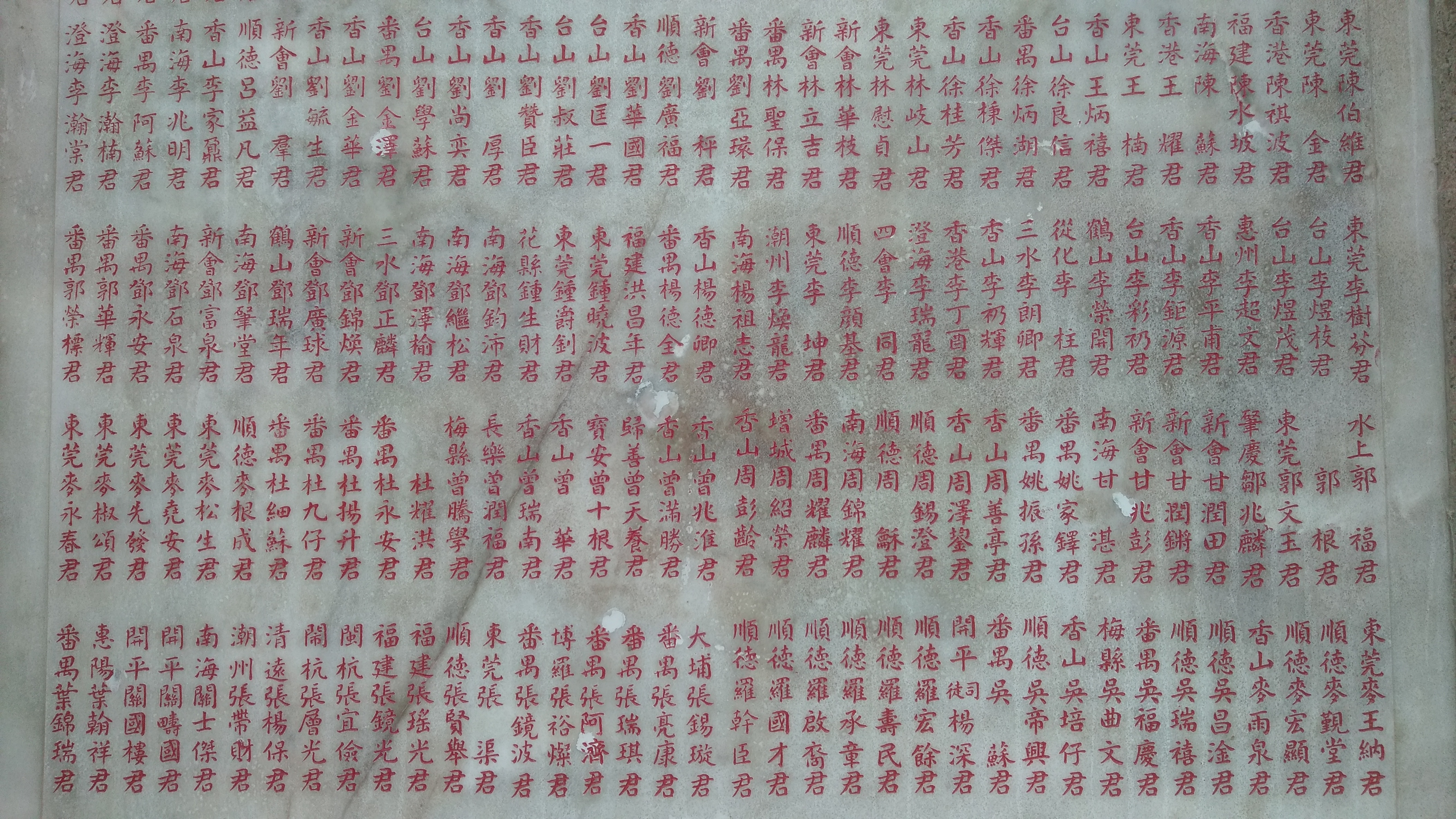
