= List of schools in Tai Po District =

This is a list of schools in Tai Po District, Hong Kong.

== Secondary schools ==
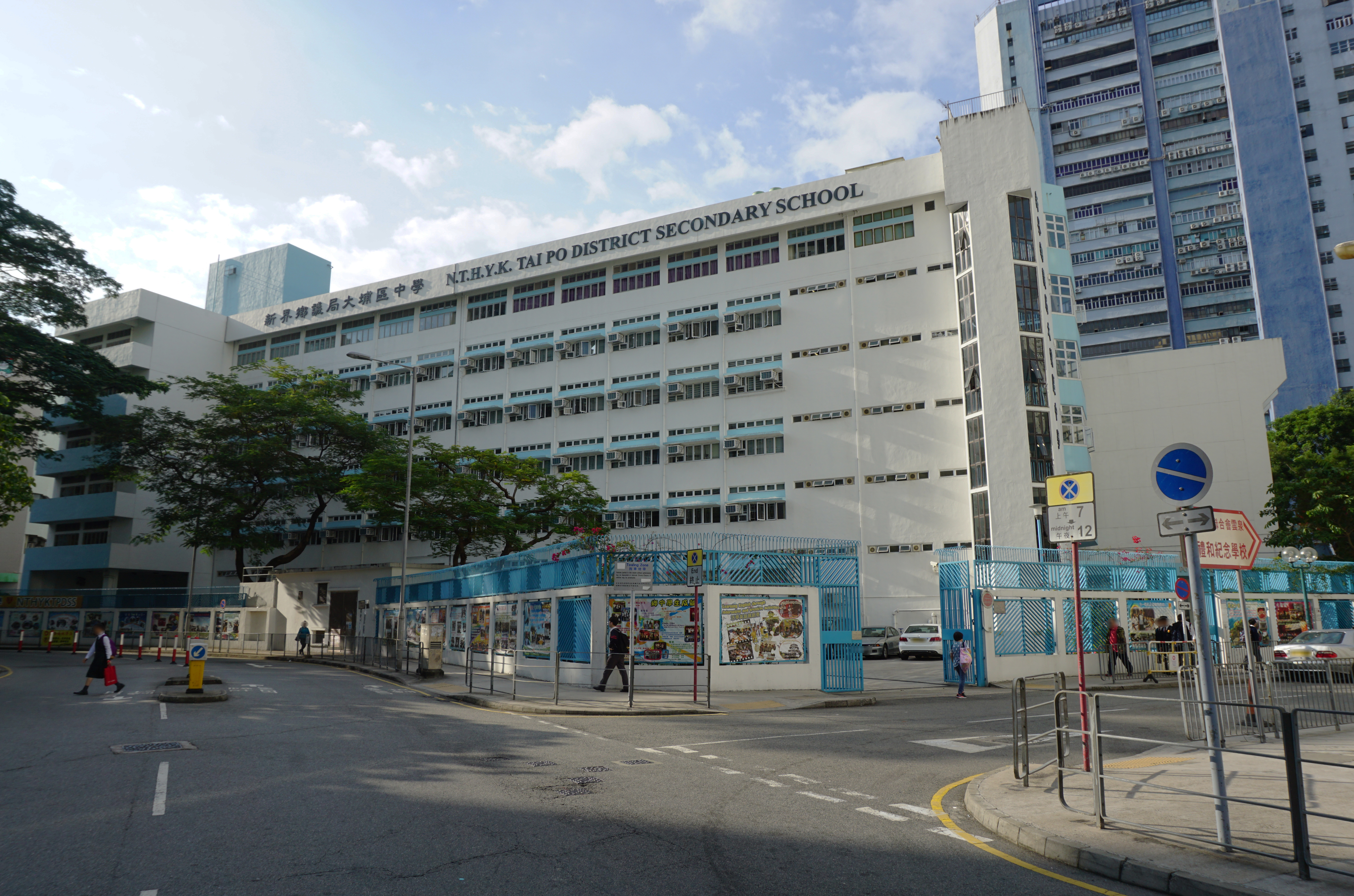
New Territories Heung Yee Kuk Tai Po District Secondary School

Government

- New Territories Heung Yee Kuk Tai Po District Secondary School

Aided

- Assembly of God Hebron Secondary School (神召會康樂中學)
- Buddhist Tai Kwong Chi Hong College (佛教大光慈航中學)
- Carmel Holy Word Secondary School (迦密聖道中學)
- Carmel Pak U Secondary School
- CCC Fung Leung Kit Memorial Secondary School (中華基督教會馮梁結紀念中學)
- China Holiness Church Living Spirit College (中華聖潔會靈風中學)
- Confucian Tai Shing Ho Kwok Pui Chun College (孔教學院大成何郭佩珍中學)
- H.K. & Kowloon Kaifong Women's Association Sun Fong Chung College (港九街坊婦女會孫方中書院)
- Hong Kong Teachers' Association Lee Heng Kwei Secondary School (香港教師會李興貴中學)
- Hong Kong Red Swastika Society Tai Po Secondary School (香港紅卍字會大埔卍慈中學)
- Hong Kong Taoist Association The Yuen Yuen Institute No. 2 Secondary School
- Kau Yan College (救恩書院)
- Ling Liang Church M H Lau Secondary School (靈糧堂劉梅軒中學)
- Salem-Immanuel Lutheran College
- SKH Bishop Mok Sau Tseng Secondary School
- Valtorta College
- Wong Shiu Chi Secondary School

Direct Subsidy Scheme

- Law Ting Pong Secondary School (羅定邦中學)
- Tai Po Sam Yuk Secondary School (大埔三育中學)

Private

- American School Hong Kong
- Assembly of God Hebron Evening School (神召會康樂夜中學)
- Hong Kong Teacher Association Evening Secondary School (香港教師會夜中學)
- Malvern College Hong Kong
- Tai Kwong Hilary College (大光德萃書院)

== Primary schools ==
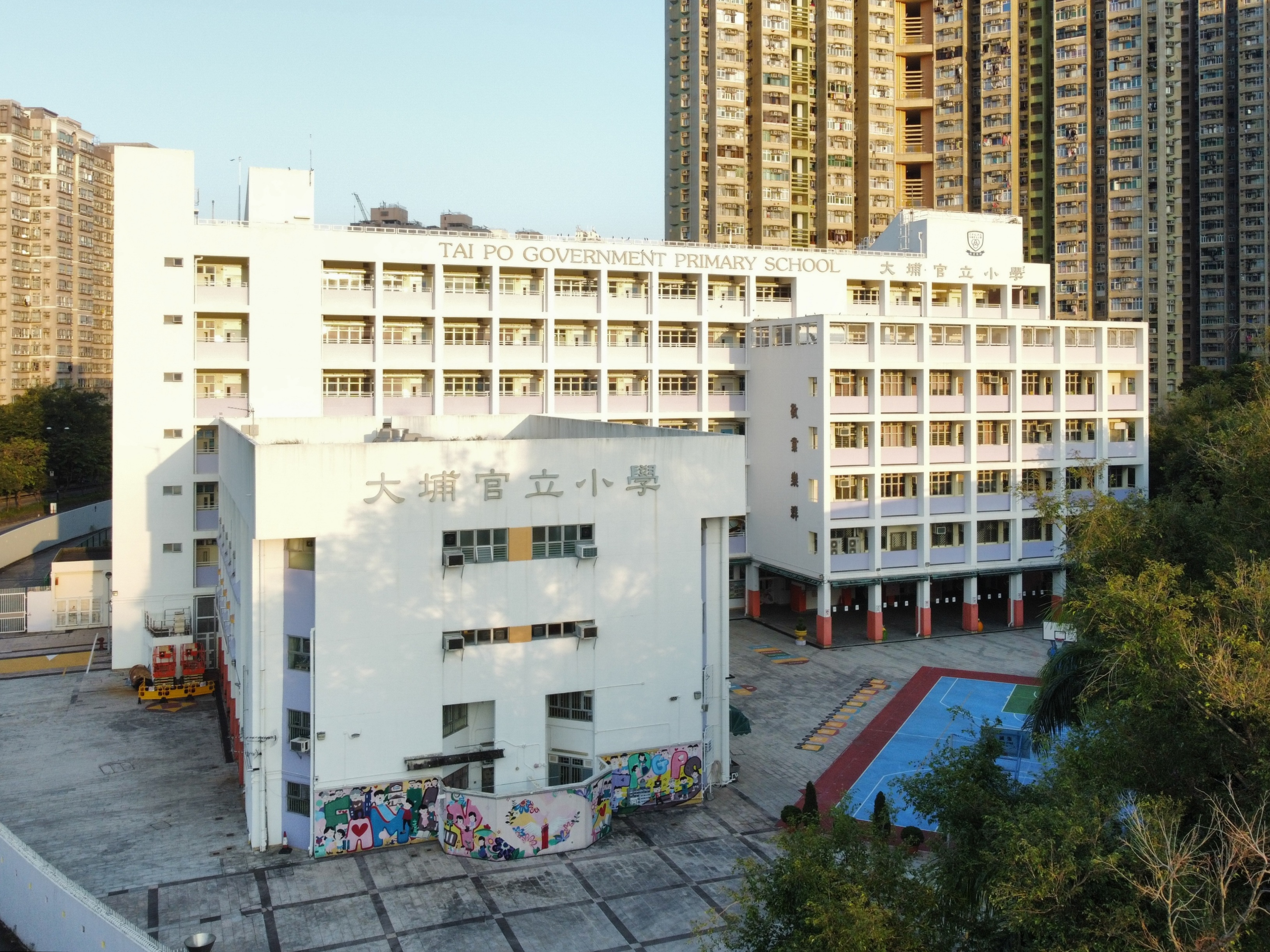
Tai Po Government Primary School (大埔官立小學)

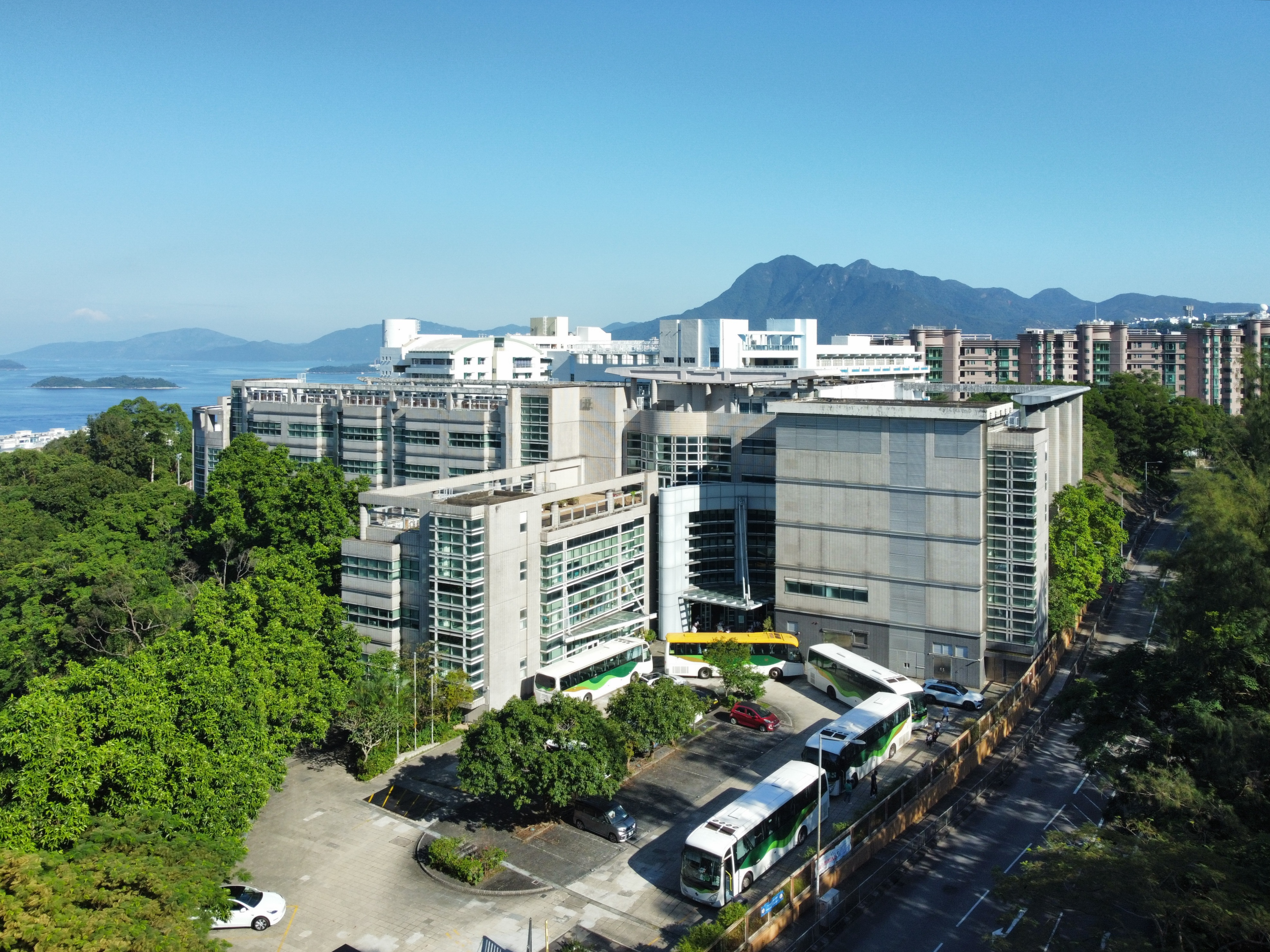
Hong Kong Japanese School Tai Po Campus/Japanese International School Campus

Government

- Tai Po Government Primary School (大埔官立小學)

Aided

- The Education University of Hong Kong Jockey Club Primary School (香港教育大學賽馬會小學)
- Hong Kong and Kowloon Kaifong Women's Association (HKKKWA) Sun Fong Chung Primary School (港九街坊婦女會孫方中小學)
- HKTA Wun Tsuen Ng Lai Wo Memorial School (香港道教聯合會雲泉吳禮和紀念學校)
- Lam Tsuen Public Wong Fook Luen Memorial School (林村公立黃福鑾紀念學校)
- NTW&JWA Leung Sing Tak Primary School (新界婦孺福利會有限公司梁省德學校)
- NTWJWA Christian Remembrance of Grace Primary School (新界婦孺福利會基督教銘恩小學)
- PLK Tin Ka Ping Millennium Primary School (保良局田家炳千禧小學)
- PLK Tin Ka Ping Primary School (保良局田家炳小學)
- S.K.H. Yuen Chen Maun Chen Jubilee Primary School (聖公會阮鄭夢芹銀禧小學)
- Sacred Heart of Mary Catholic Primary School (天主教聖母聖心小學)
- Sam Shui Natives Association Huen King Wing School (三水同鄉會禤景榮學校)
- SKH Yuen Chen Maun Chen Primary School (聖公會阮鄭夢芹小學)
- Sung Tak Wong Kin Sheung Memorial School (大埔崇德黃建常紀念學校)
- Tai Po Baptist Public School (大埔浸信會公立學校)
- Tai Po Methodist School (大埔循道衛理小學)
- Tai Po Old Market Public School (Plover Clove) (大埔舊墟公立學校（寶湖道）)
- Tai Po Old Market Public School (大埔舊墟公立學校)
- YCH Choi Hin To Primary School (仁濟醫院蔡衍濤小學)

Private

- American School Hong Kong
- Hong Kong Japanese School Tai Po Campus/Japanese International School
- International College Hong Kong Hong Lok Yuen (Primary Section)
- Malvern College Hong Kong
- Norwegian International School
- Spanish Primary School
  - The Spanish Primary School, which has education in Spanish, English, and Mandarin under the National Curriculum for England, was organised by Adriana Chan. It opened in September 2017.
- St Hilary's Primary School (德萃小學)

== Special schools ==
Aided

- Hong Chi Pinehill School (匡智松嶺學校)
- Hong Chi Pinehill No. 2 School (匡智松嶺第二校)
- Hong Chi Pinehill No. 3 School (匡智松嶺第三校
- Hong Kong Red Cross Hospital Schools Alice Ho Miu Ling Nethersole Hospital (香港紅十字會醫院學校)
- SAHK Jockey Club Elaine Field School (香港耀能協會賽馬會田綺玲學校)

== Closed ==
- Tai Po Government Secondary School
