= Sir Ellis Kadoorie (S) Primary School =

School in Hong Kong

Coordinates: 22.2767°N 114.1897°E

- Chinese: 官立嘉道理爵士小學
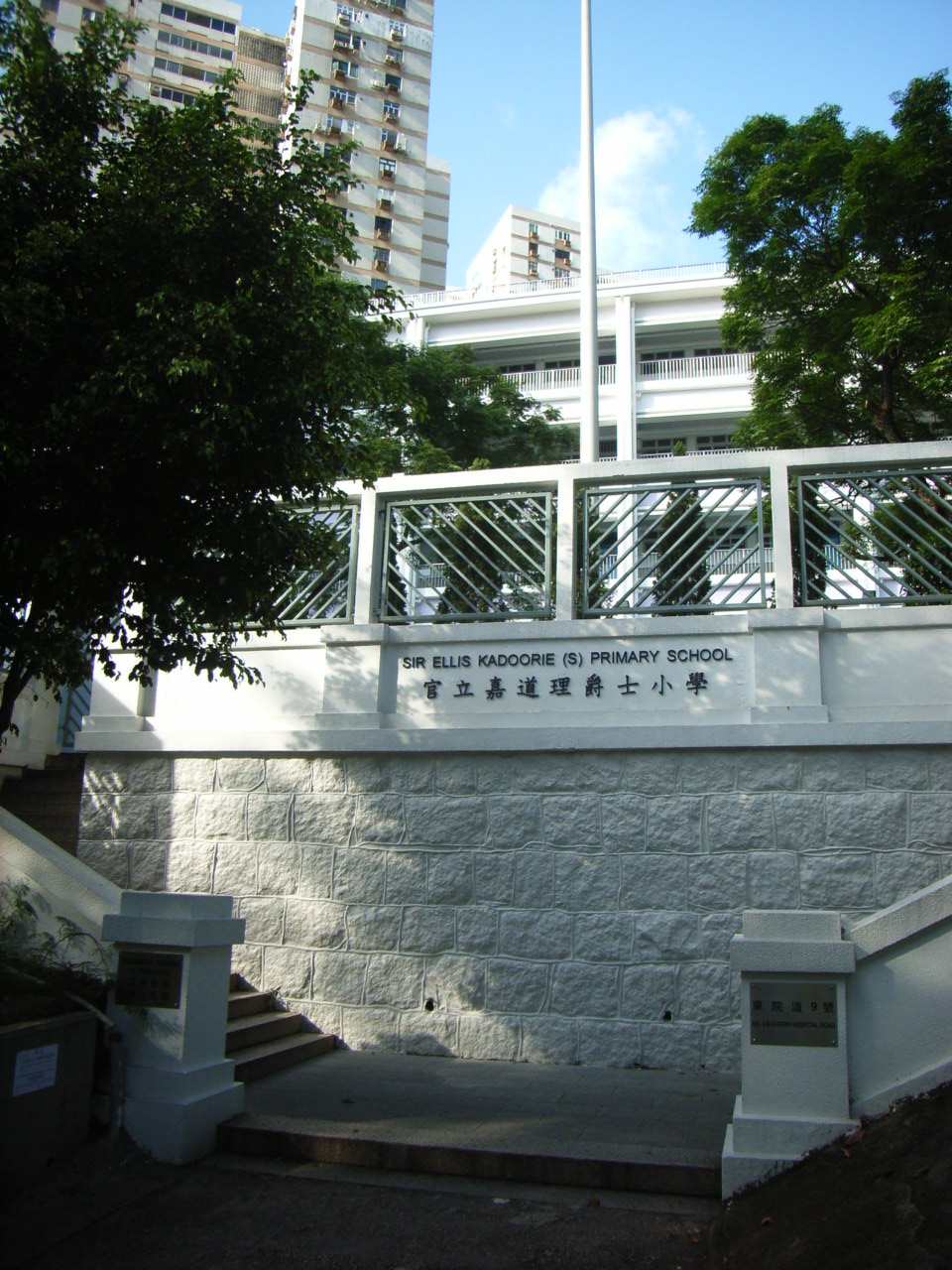

Information
- Established: 16 October 1916; 109 years ago
- Founder: Sir Ellis Kadoorie
- Gender: Boys (formerly); Mixed (currently)
- Language: Chinese (1916-1953); English (1953-present)

Sir Ellis Kadoorie (S) Primary School (Chinese: 官立嘉道理爵士小學) is a government-operated public primary school in So Kon Po, Wan Chai District, Hong Kong.

== History ==
Sir Ellis Kadoorie built the school to educate residents of South Asian origin. Kadoorie opened a school in 1891, in Sai Ying Poon. On 16 October 1916 the Ellis Kadoorie School for Indians was created by the Governor of Hong Kong. Its purpose was to educate children of South Asian descent. The school was initially a primary school only, and only for male children. The original building had two stories.

Sir Ellis Kadoorie (S) Primary School
- Traditional Chinese: 官立嘉道理爵士小學
- Simplified Chinese: 官立嘉道理爵士小学
- Literal meaning: Government Kadoorie Sir Primary School
Transcriptions
Standard Mandarin
- Hanyu Pinyin: Guānlì Jiādàoli Juéshì Xiǎoxué
Yue: Cantonese
- Jyutping: gun1 laap6 gaa1 dou6 lei5 zoek3 si6 siu2 hok6

Kadoorie School closed in World War II. It resumed operations on 11 February 1946; the majority of students were ethnic Chinese with relatively few of South Asian descent. Kadoorie School previously had separate shifts in the morning and afternoon. The ethnic Chinese attended afternoon shifts (P. M. School) while ethnic South Asians attended morning shifts (A. M. School). By 1953 there was an increase in the number of South Asian students. The Hong Kong government officially designated the A.M. school as being for South Asians effective 1 September 1953. The curriculum of that portion was rewritten to cater to South Asian students. Additionally the medium of instruction became English; it was previously Chinese. Kadoorie also became a coeducational school.

Its current building, with 24 classrooms on five floors, opened in 1959, and the previous building was razed. Dr John S L Woo supervised the construction.

Secondary levels were added in the 1960s. In 1975 it became a whole day school and no longer had morning and afternoon shifts. Form 4 came in 1977, and Form 5 came in 1978. In 1985 the institution had 282 students in ten classes at the secondary level.

In 1980 the Kadoorie School was divided into separate schools for primary and secondary levels. Sir Ellis Kadoorie Secondary School (West Kowloon) opened in 2000, taking secondary levels. The secondary school states that its heritage originates from the Kadoorie School set up in Sai Ying Poon.

== Demographics ==
The school had a focus on establishing inter-racial relations. In 1985 ethnic Chinese were the third largest group of students, and students of Indian and Pakistani origins, respectively, were the first and second largest student groups. Other students had origins from Burma (Myanmar), Korea, Nepal, the Philippines, Portugal, and Thailand.

== Curriculum ==
Chinese was offered in 1985 as a foreign language. Circa 1985 the school began offering French courses, and it also had courses on the Hindi and Urdu forms of Hindustani.

Urdu was the only non-English language available for study in 1939, although school administrators felt that Urdu was not viable in commerce and considered allowing other languages for study; the SCMP wrote that Urdu "had for many years been a stumbling block to [the students]." In 1953, after the school became English medium, Chinese and both registers of Hindustani were available as non-English languages.

== Operations ==
In 1939 the South China Morning Post reported that the school was trying to separate students by age as having more varied student ages made it difficult to maintain classroom discipline.

== See also ==
- List of schools in Wan Chai District
- List of government schools in Hong Kong
- List of primary schools in Hong Kong
