= Happy Valley Racecourse =

Racecourse in Hong Kong

Coordinates: 22°16′22″N 114°10′56″E

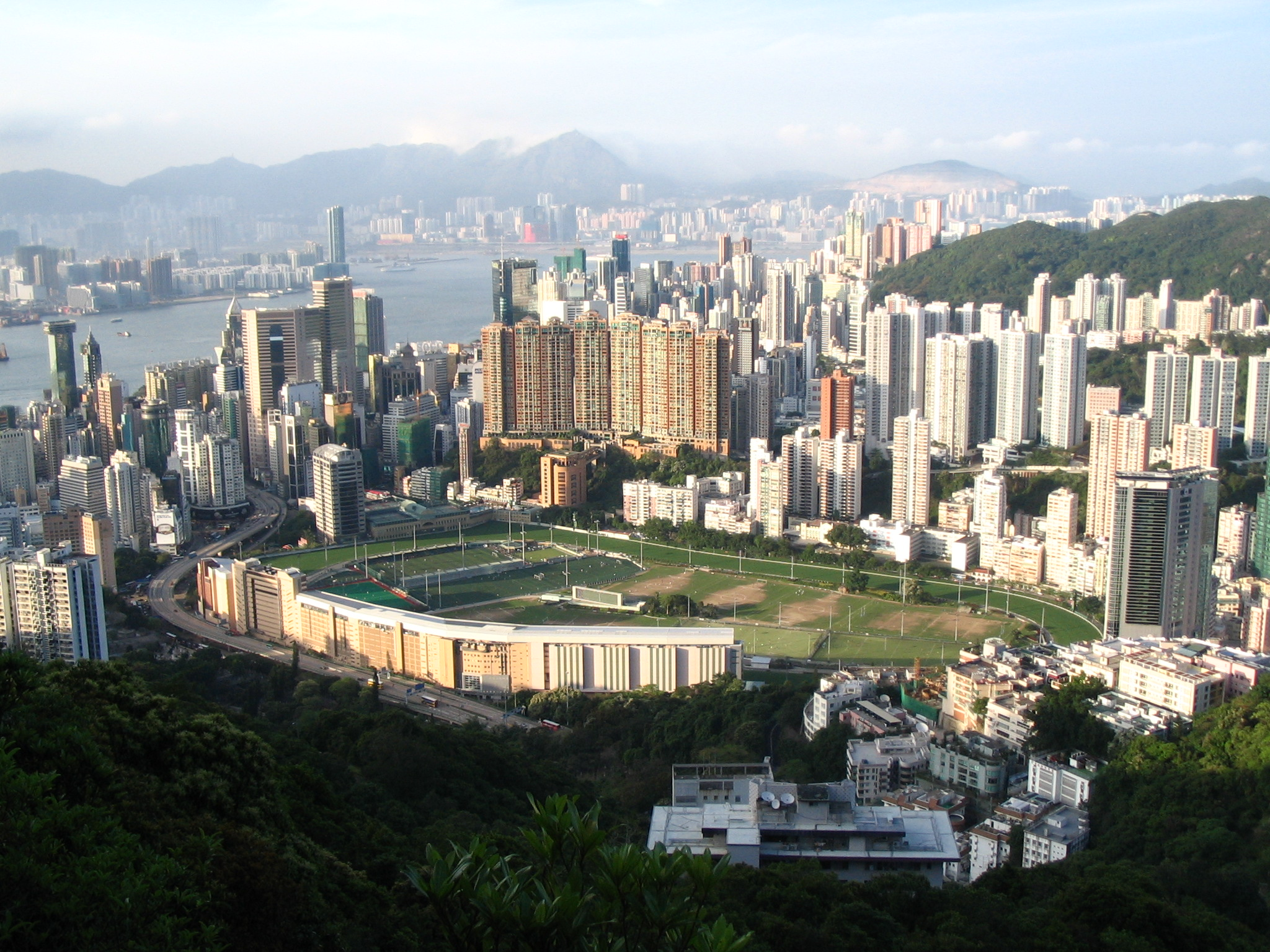
- View of the racecourse
- Interactive map of Happy Valley Racecourse
- Location: Wan Chai District, Hong Kong
- Owned by: Hong Kong Jockey Club
- Date opened: 1845; 181 years ago
- Capacity: 55,000
- Course type: Flat racing

Happy Valley Racecourse
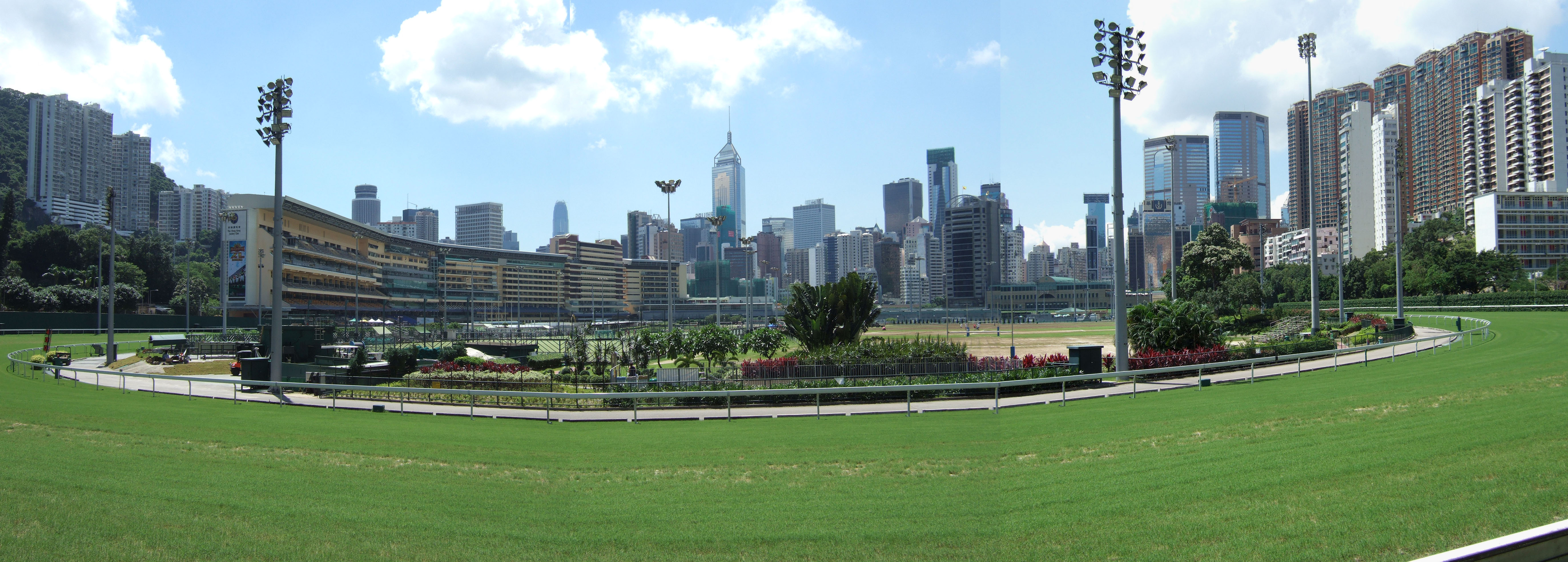
- Westerly panorama of the racecourse

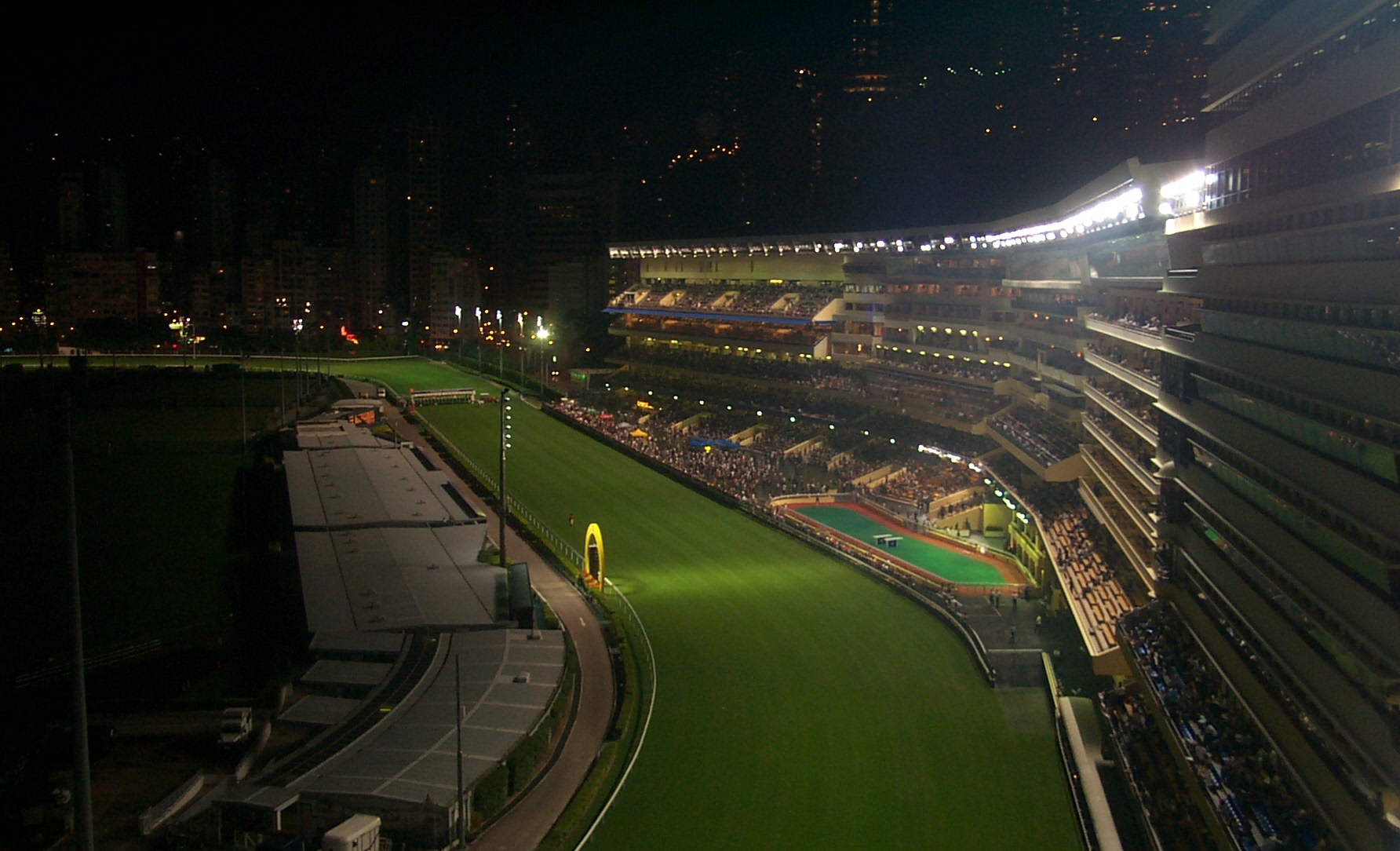
- Racecourse at night
- Traditional Chinese: 快活谷馬場
- Simplified Chinese: 快活谷马场
Transcriptions
Standard Mandarin
- Hanyu Pinyin: Kuàihuogǔ mǎchǎng
- Yale Romanization: Kwàihwogǔ mǎchǎng
Yue: Cantonese
- Yale Romanization: Faai wuht gùk máh cheùhng
- Jyutping: Faai3 wut6 guk1 maa5 coeng4
- IPA: [fāːi wʊ̀t kʊ̂k ma̬ː tsʰœ̏ːŋ]

Alternative Chinese name
- Traditional Chinese: 跑馬地馬場
- Simplified Chinese: 跑马地马场
Transcriptions
Standard Mandarin
- Hanyu Pinyin: Pǎomǎdì mǎchǎng
- Yale Romanization: Pǎumǎdì mǎchǎng
Yue: Cantonese
- Yale Romanization: Paaú màh deí máh cheùhng
- Jyutping: Paau2 maa5 dei2 maa5 coeng4
- IPA: [pʰǎːu ma̬ː těi ma̬ː tsʰœ̏ːŋ]

The Happy Valley Racecourse is one of two racecourses for horse racing in Hong Kong. It is located in Happy Valley on Hong Kong Island, surrounded by Wong Nai Chung Road and Morrison Hill Road. The capacity of the venue is 55,000.

== History ==
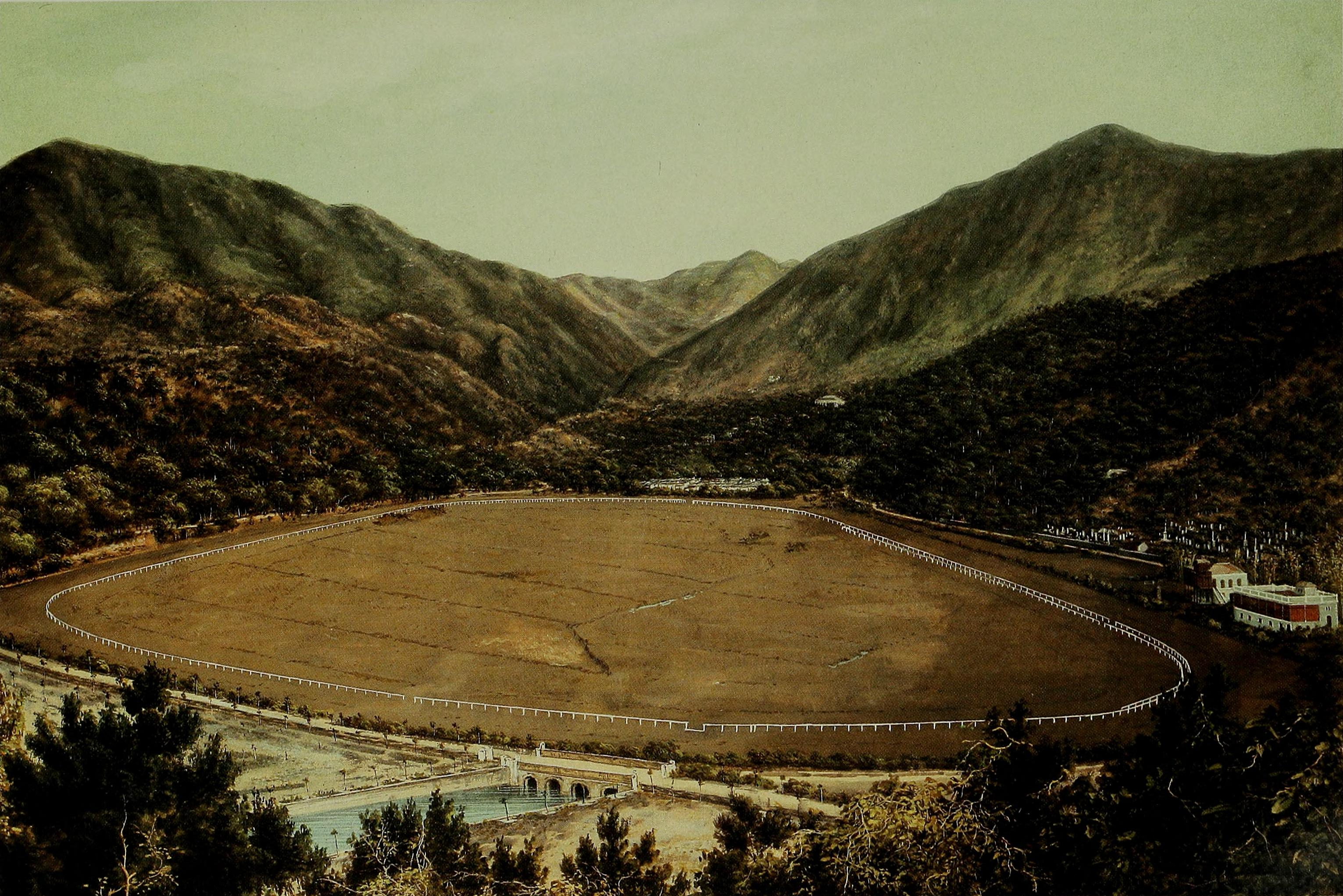
Happy Valley Racecourse, 1840s

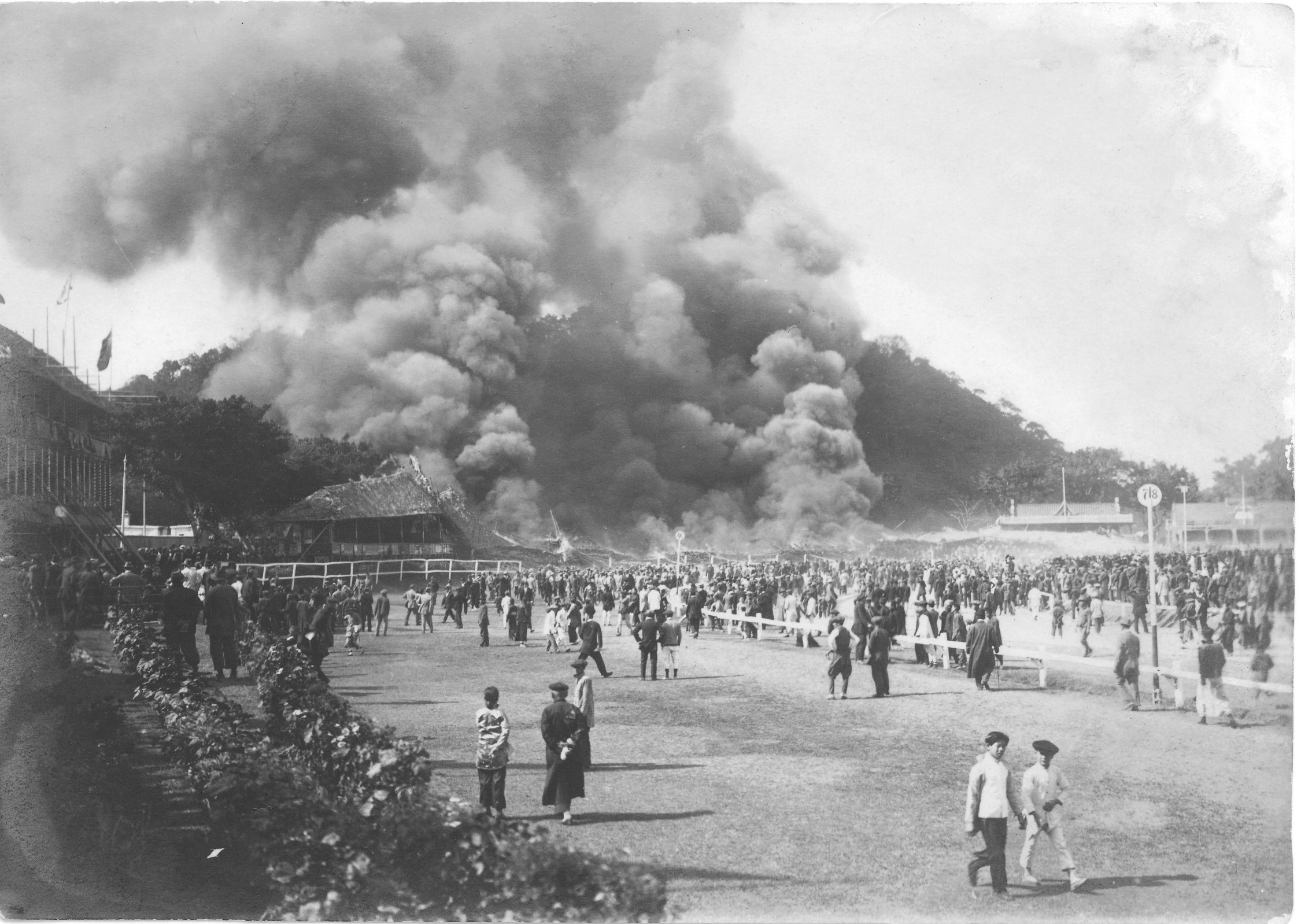
The 1918 fire at the racecourse

It was first built in 1845 to provide horse racing for the British people in Hong Kong. The area was previously swampland, but the only flat ground suitable for horse racing on Hong Kong Island. To make way for the racecourse, Hong Kong Government prohibited rice growing by villages in the surrounding area. The first race ran in December 1846. Over the years, horse racing became more and more popular among the Chinese residents.

On 26 February 1918, a temporary grandstand collapsed, knocking over hot food stalls that set bamboo matting ablaze. The ensuing fire killed at least 590 people.

Over the years, facilities have been added and extended, including extensively in 1995.

== Facilities ==
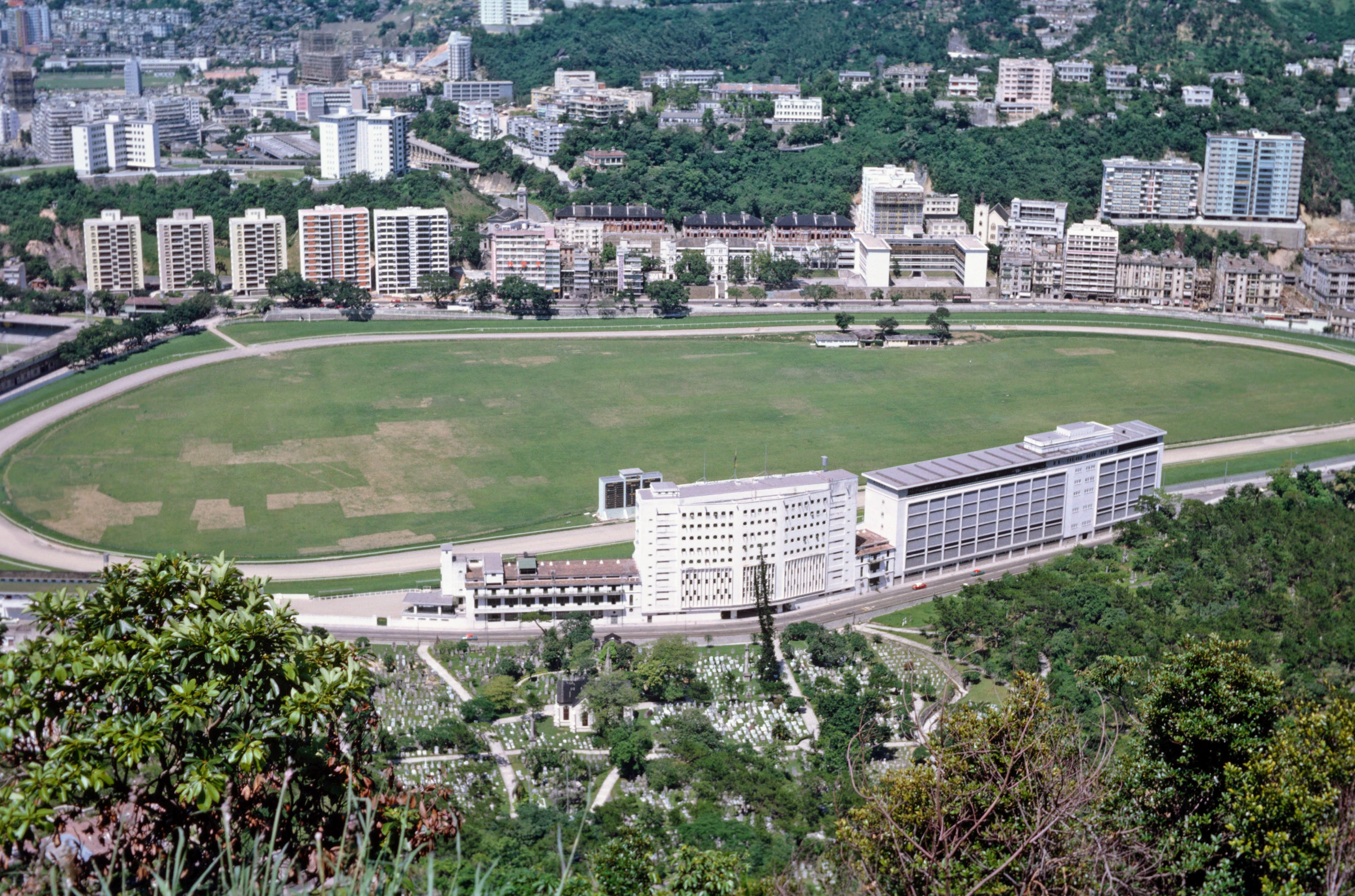
Happy Valley Racecourse in 1963

The Happy Valley Racecourse is one of two racecourses in Hong Kong used by the Hong Kong Jockey Club for horse racing meets, the other being the Sha Tin Racecourse. Races in Happy Valley usually take place on Wednesday nights and are open to the public as well as members of the club. The Happy Valley Racecourse and its seven-storey stands are capable of accommodating approximately 55,000 spectators.

The inner field of the course contains sports and leisure facilities such as football (a total of 11), hockey and rugby fields, managed by the Leisure and Cultural Services Department.

== The Hong Kong Jockey Club Archive and Museum ==
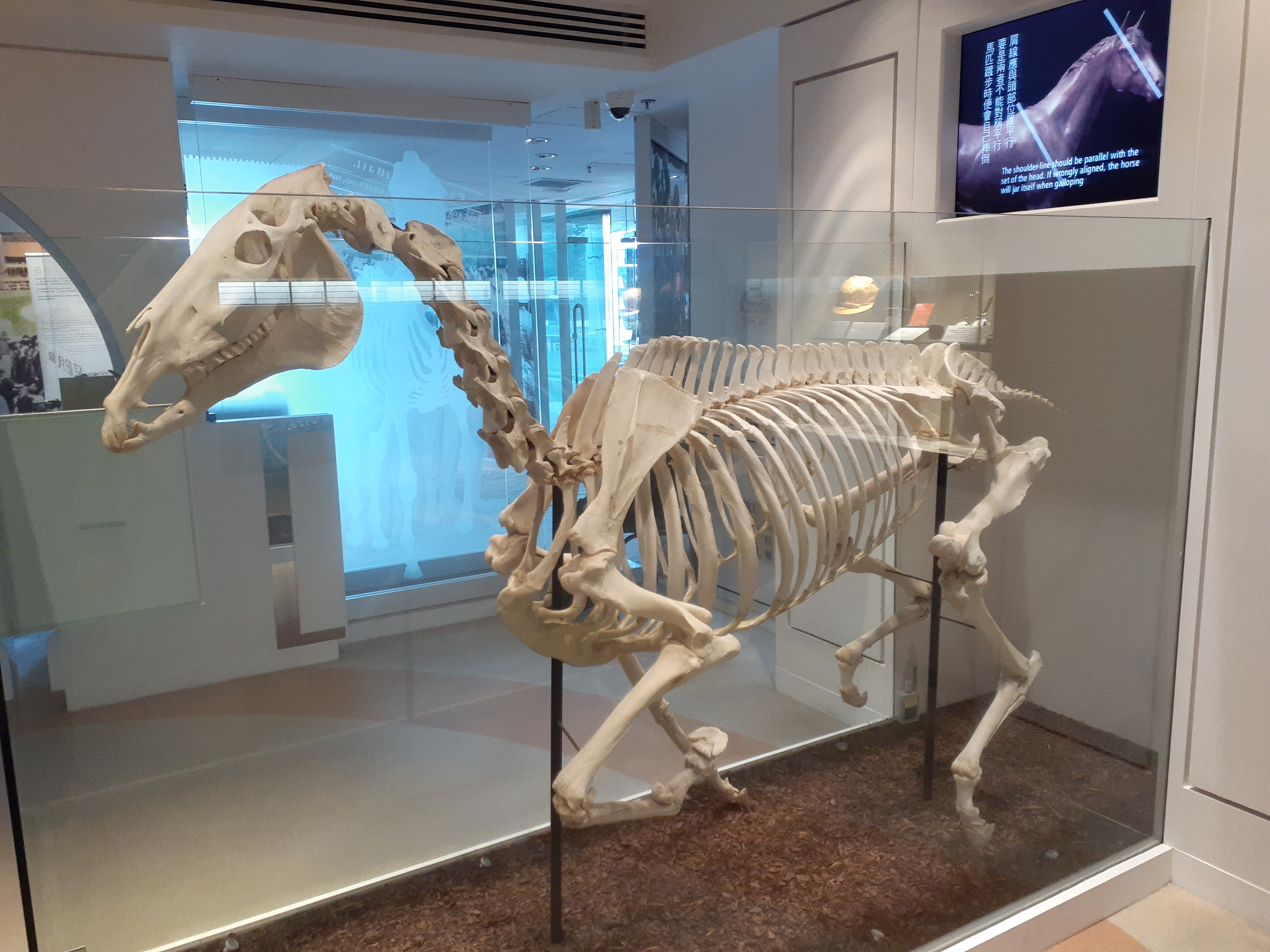
Silver Lining's skeleton at Happy Valley Racing Museum.

The Hong Kong Jockey Club Archive and Museum (or Hong Kong Racing Museum) was set up in 1995 and opened on 18 October 1996. It is now located on the second floor of the Happy Valley Stand of the racecourse.

There are four galleries in the museum:

- The Origin of Our Horses: Shows the migration route horses travelled in the early days from the northern part of China to Hong Kong.
- Shaping Sha Tin: Exhibits the history of construction of Sha Tin Racecourse.
- Understanding Horses: Exhibits the skeleton of the three-time Hong Kong Champion Silver Lining.
- Thematic Exhibitions: The history of the Jockey Club is exhibited. Selected charitable organisations and community projects supported by The Hong Kong Jockey Club Charities Trust are also displayed in this gallery.

There is also a cinema and a souvenir shop in the museum.

== See also ==
- Hong Kong Tourism Board
