= Sir Ellis Kadoorie Secondary School (West Kowloon) =

Hong Kong secondary school

Coordinates: 22.3226°N 114.1552°E

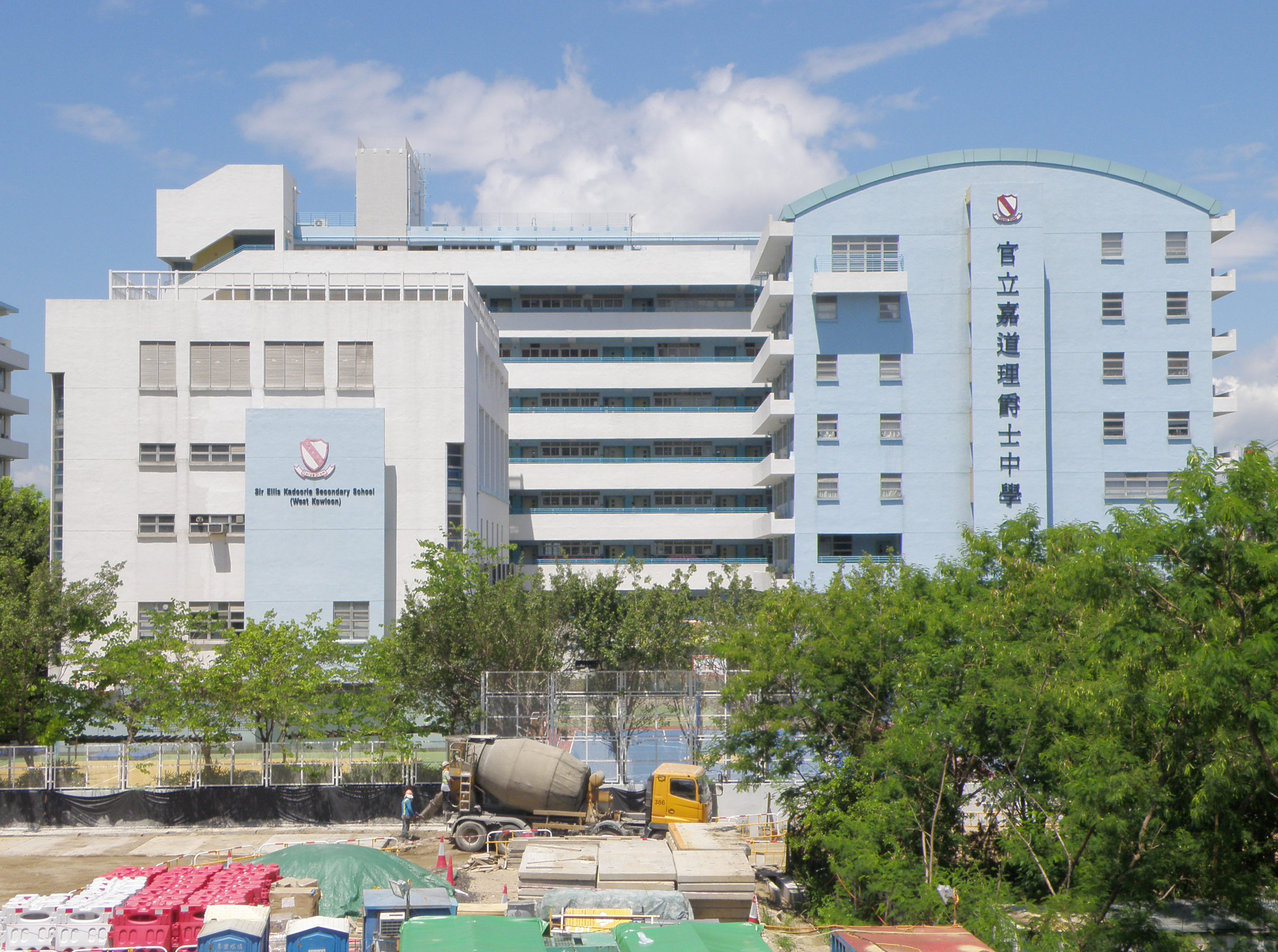
- Sir Ellis Kadoorie Secondary School (West Kowloon)
- Traditional Chinese: 官立嘉道理爵士中學（西九龍）
- Simplified Chinese: 官立嘉道理爵士中学（西九龙）
- Cantonese Yale: gūn laahp gā douh léih jeuk sih jūng hohk (sāi gáu lùhng)
- Literal meaning: Government-operated Kadoorie Sir Secondary School (West Kowloon)
Transcriptions
Standard Mandarin
- Hanyu Pinyin: Guānlì Jiādàoli Juéshì Zhōngxué (Xī Jiǔlóng)
Yue: Cantonese
- Yale Romanization: gūn laahp gā douh léih jeuk sih jūng hohk (sāi gáu lùhng)
- Jyutping: gun1 laap6 gaa1 dou6 lei5 zoek3 si6 zung1 hok6 (sai1 gau2 lung4)

Sir Ellis Kadoorie Secondary School (West Kowloon) (SEKSS(WK)) is a secondary school in Tai Kok Tsui, Yau Tsim Mong District, Kowloon, Hong Kong.

It was established on 16 October 1916 as The Ellis Kadoorie School for Indians by the Governor of Hong Kong. Its purpose was to educate children of South Asian descent. The school states that its heritage originates from the Kadoorie School set up in Sai Ying Poon in the 1890s.

The initial institution was primary only but secondary levels were added in the 1960s. Form 4 came in 1977, and Form 5 came in 1978. In 1980 the Kadoorie School was divided into separate schools for primary and secondary levels.

In 1994 Sir Ellis Kadoorie Secondary was the sole government-operated secondary school with a programme catering to non-ethnic Chinese students.

Sir Ellis Kadoorie Secondary School is south of Nam Cheong Station, along a short walk.

== Admissions ==
As of 2001 its catchment is Hong Kong wide and does not have admission preferences based on location.

== Curriculum ==
Its secondary curriculum uses the Hong Kong Certificate of Education Examination format. English is the language of instruction.

== Student body ==
In the 2000-2001 school year, 35% of the students were of Pakistani origin, 26% were of Indian origin, 19% were of Filipino origin, 10% were ethnic Chinese, and 7% were of Nepalese origin. In 1994, over 50% were of Indian origin. At that time the total number of students exceeded 300.
