= Diocesan Native Female Training School =

Coordinates: 22.2845°N 114.1438°E

Diocesan Native Female Training School (DNFTS, Chinese: 曰字樓女館) was a school under the Anglican Church of Hong Kong in the 19th century, founded in 1860 and closed down in 1868. Its premises now belong to today's Bonham Road Government Primary School(般咸道官立小學). In 1869, another institution called Diocesan Home and Orphanage (DHO, later renamed Diocesan School and Orphanage, and now known as Diocesan Boys' School) was founded in the same place. Due to the obvious differences in founding groups, vision of education, personnel arrangement and students’ background, DNFTS has been regarded only as a forerunner, and called ‘the First Foundation’ by DHO and later DBS. Using 1869 as its founding year, DBS calls itself ‘the Second Foundation’. As for Diocesan Girls' School, founded in Rose Villas near DSO in 1899, it claims to be the successor of DNFTS and traces the founding year back to 1860.

== Brief history ==
In 1860, DNFTS was co-founded by the Society for the Promotion of Female Education in the Far East (FES) and Lady Lydia Smith, the wife of the first Bishop of Victoria, with Lady Robinson, the wife of Governor Sir Hercules Robinson, as the patroness. The school aimed to provide Christian education to the local females. The students were trained to be teachers of English and missionaries, and supposed to be future Christian wives of the graduates of St. Paul's College, Hong Kong, the largest school under the Anglican Church. In those days, the converted male students of St. Paul's usually faced the problem of marrying ‘heathen’ women. It was expected that the founding of DNFTS could alleviate this difficult situation.

Around 1860, DNFTS appealed for teachers to serve in. Ms. Susan Baxter, an English lady, responded the call and left for Hong Kong in April. On arrival she learnt that the local ladies’ committee had already appointed a teacher to the position she hoped to fill, and the mission of DNFTS was somewhat different from her expectation, so she set up several vernacular schools herself. In 1862, Ms. M.A.W. Eaton was appointed as the superintendent of DNFTS, while a concrete house was built up in a paddy field by the Bonham Road in the same year. Teaching, boarding and all the activities were accommodated there.

Though Ms. Eaton showed her enthusiasm and capability in running the school, the Chinese community in Hong Kong did not wish their daughters to receive Western education. Some poor families even sold their daughters, who learnt some English, at a better price. In addition, according to Dr. E. J. Eitel’s letter to the Colonial Secretary Frederick Stewart, DNFTS was forced to close temporarily in 1865 upon learning that almost every one of the girls learned English there, and became the kept mistress of foreigners on leaving school.

In early December of 1864, Ms. Eaton was assaulted by some Chinese ruffians on her way back to the campus from evensong. As mentioned in newspapers then, this incident also demonstrated the Chinese community’s negative attitude towards DNFTS. Saved from danger, Ms. Eaton immediately asked for leave and dismissed the school without any notification in advance, and this aroused the dissatisfaction from the school committee.

Ms. Eaton resigned eventually, and the school was reopened in 1865, with Ms. Rendle as the head. In 1866, the school was renamed Diocesan Female School, and the enrollment was not confined to Chinese girls as before. However, English teaching was not available to them any more. In November 1867, the school was mired in serious financial crisis. The committee asked for help from Bishop Charles Alford, the second Bishop of Victoria, but got no response.

Ms. Rendle resigned in 1868, and her office was taken up by Ms. M.J. Oxlad, who had also been the headmistress of the Baxter schools. In the same year, Bishop Alford took DNFTS under his immediate superintendence, which marked the end of the very school.

As the result of the huge difference between DNFTS’s mission and reality, it was then believed by both the Chinese and Western communities that the teaching of English language to Chinese girls could be fatal. In the following three decades, English education was almost never provided in the Anglican girls’ schools including Baxter schools and Fairlea. This situation was not changed until the opening of Diocesan Girls’ School in 1899.

== Roster of Superintendents ==
	Name	Name in Chinese	Office	Remarks
1.	Ms. Wilson	韋以信女士	1860－1862	
2.	Ms. M.A.W. Eaton	伊頓女士	1862－1865	Married Dr. E. J. Eitel in 1866.
3.	Ms. Rendle	蘭德爾女士	1865－1866	
4.	Ms. M.J. Oxlad	岳士列女士	1867－1868	Simultaneously the superintendent of the Baxter Schools.

== Repercussions ==
In 1869, the co-educational Diocesan Home and Orphanage came into existence. In the following year, Mr. and Mrs. W.M.B. Arthur were appointed as the headmaster and matron respectively. Upon the resignation of the Arthurs in 1878, Bishop J. Burdon, the third Bishop, proposed to invite FES to come back and run the school. The proposal was agreed by the school committee. Nonetheless, this meeting was held in the absence of W.W. Keswick, a powerful committee member. When he returned to Hong Kong, the proposal was harshly criticized so that the Bishop had to withdraw it. The result was reverted and DHO was planned to transform gradually into a boys’ school. A couple of months later, George Piercy, the third master of the Central School, became the new headmaster of DHO.

In 1891, DHO was finally transformed into a boys’ school, and renamed Diocesan School and Orphanage. The girls were accepted by Fairlea's School (which merged with Victoria Home into Heep Yunn School in 1936) then headed by Ms. Margaret Johnstone. Margaret also played an important part in establishing the Diocesan Girls’ School in 1899.

In the 1950s, Dr. Joyce Symons, the headmistress of DGS planned to celebrate their centennial in 1960. She was embroiled in a heated debate with Canon George Zimmern, the headmaster of DBS. After the intervention of Bishop Ronald Hall, it was finally agreed that DGS would be allowed to use the year 1860 as its founding year, while the founding year of DBS would remain 1869 henceforth. In the collective memory of DGS, Ms. Baxter, who never assumed office in DNFTS and died in 1865, is somehow remembered as the headmistress from 1860 to the 1890s. The names of Wilson, Eaton, Rendle and Oxlad seldom appear in their historic narration nevertheless.

== See also ==
- George Smith (bishop)
- Charles Alford
- John Burdon (bishop)
- Susan Baxter
- Margaret Johnstone
- Ernst Johann Eitel
- Diocesan Boys' School
- Diocesan Girls' School
- Heep Yunn School
- St. Paul's College, Hong Kong
- Canon George Zimmern
- Joyce Symons
- Ronald Hall
