= List of schools in Central and Western District =

This is a list of schools in Central and Western District, Hong Kong.

== Secondary schools ==
Government

- King's College

Aided

- Lok Sin Tong Leung Kau Kui College
- Raimondi College (高主教書院)
- St. Clare's Girls' School
- St Joseph's College
- St Louis School
- St. Stephen's Church College
- St Stephen's Girls' College
- Ying Wa Girls' School

Direct Subsidy Scheme

- St. Paul's Co-educational College
- St Paul's College

Private

- German Swiss International School
- Island Waldorf School (香島華德福學校)

== Primary schools ==
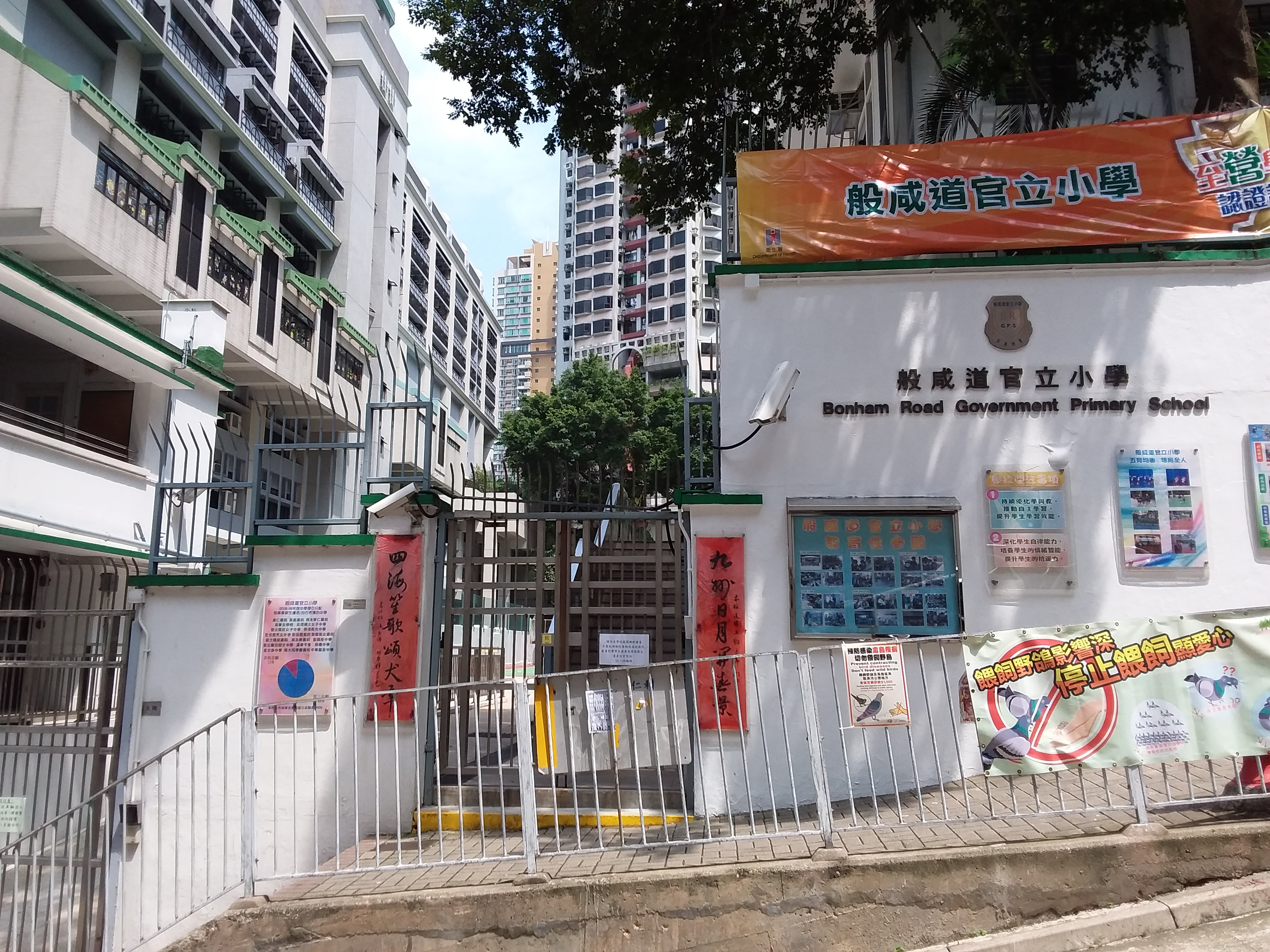
Bonham Road Government Primary School

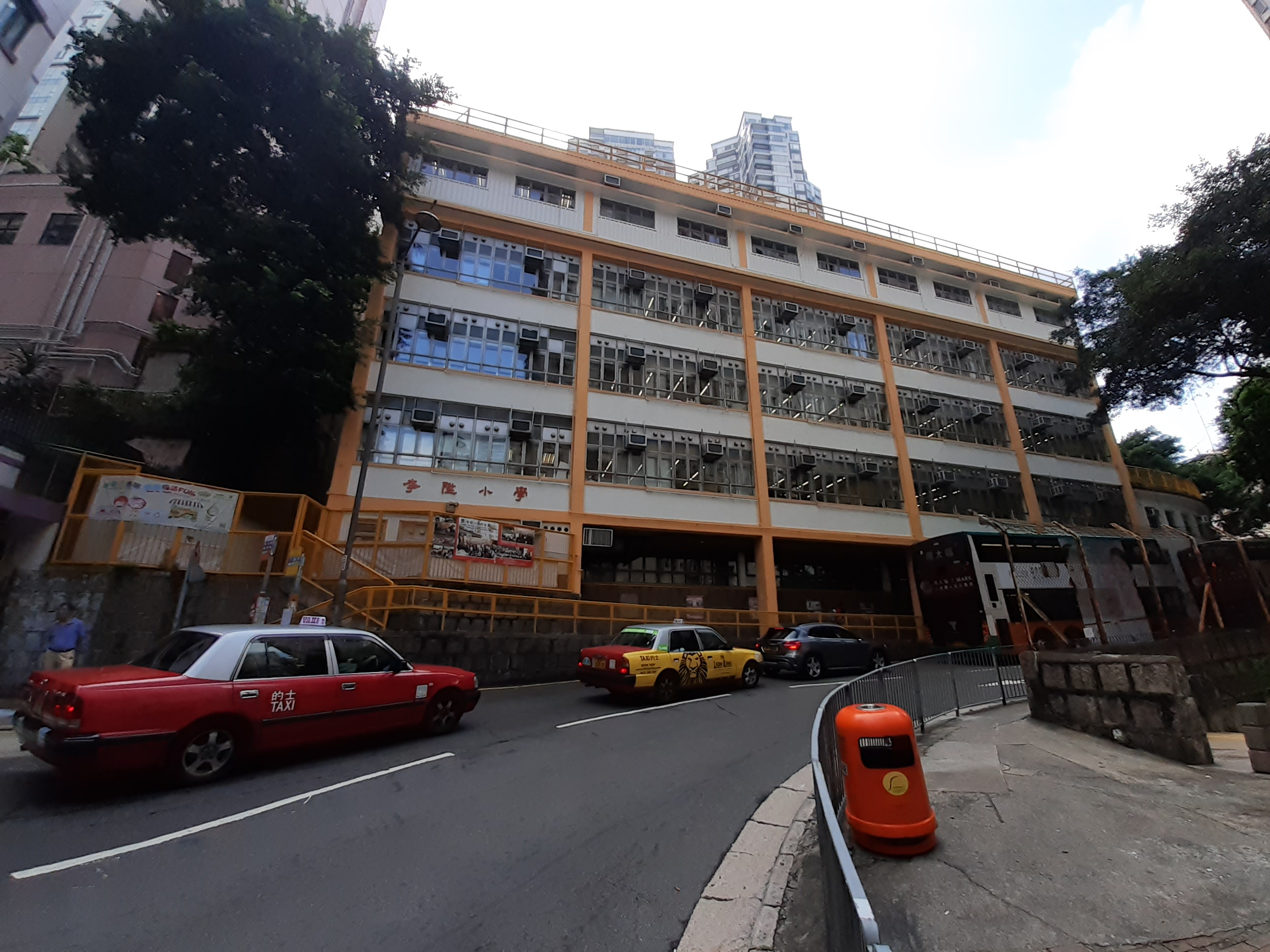
Li Sing Primary School

Arranged by alphabetical order of their full names in each category.

Government

- Bonham Road Government Primary School
- Li Sing Primary School (李陞小學)

Aided

- Catholic Mission School (天主教總堂區學校)
- Central & Western District St Anthony's School (中西區聖安多尼學校)
- Chiu Sheung School, Hong Kong (香港潮商學校)
- King's College Old Boys' Association Primary School (英皇書院同學會小學)
- King's College Old Boys' Association Primary School No. 2 (英皇書院同學會小學第二校)
- Sacred Heart Canossian School (嘉諾撒聖心學校)
- San Wui Commercial Society School (新會商會學校)
- SKH Kei Yan Primary School (聖公會基恩小學)
- SKH Lui Ming Choi Memorial Primary School (聖公會呂明才紀念小學)
- SKH St Matthew's Primary School (聖公會聖馬太小學)
- S.K.H. St. Peter's Primary School (聖公會聖彼得小學)
- St Anthony's School (聖安多尼學校)
- St Charles School (聖嘉祿學校)
- St Stephen's Girls' Primary School (聖士提反女子中學附屬小學)

English Schools Foundation

- Glenealey School (己連拿小學)
- Peak School

Private

- Carmel School
- German Swiss International School
- Island Christian Academy
- Island Waldorf School (香島華德福學校)
- Kau Yan School (救恩學校)
- Sacred Heart Canossian School, Private Section (嘉諾撒聖心學校私立部)
- St Clare's Primary School (聖嘉勒小學)
- St. Louis School (Primary Section) (聖類斯中學（小學部）)

== Special schools ==
Aided

- Hong Kong Red Cross Hospital Schools (香港紅十字會醫院學校) - Affiliated with the Hong Kong Red Cross
