= Susan Baxter =

British missionary and educator in Hong Kong (1828–1865)

Susan Harriet Sophia Baxter (9 December 1828 – 30 June 1865), also known as 白思德 in the Chinese community, was a British missionary and educator in Hong Kong.

Susan was the third child born to Joanna and Robert Baxter. A parliamentary solicitor of Westminster and a man of strong religious convictions, Robert's evangelical zeal made an impact on the first two bishops of Victoria (Hong Kong), George Smith and Charles Alford when they served in Doncaster in the 1840s and 1850s respectively. Influenced by her father, Susan became a missionary to China.

Around 1860, Lydia Smith, the Bishop's wife who was a member of the Society for Promoting Female Education (FES), planned to set up a Diocesan Native Female Training School in Hong Kong and appealed for teachers to serve there. Susan responded to the call and left for Hong Kong in April 1860. On arrival she learnt that the local ladies' committee had already appointed a teacher to the position she hoped to fill, so she set up several schools herself, which included:

- an English school in Mosque Street for European children of soldiers and abandoned Eurasian orphans;
- a Chinese girls' day school in Staunton Street;
- a girls' boarding school with day school for boys in her house on Bonham Road.

In school she did more than teach: she clothed, fed, and buried the dead, and regularly visited soldiers' wives with Mrs. Smith and offered help to the needy in Hong Kong and Canton. She was respected and beloved by both the Chinese and Europeans, according to Bishop Smith.

In June 1865, Susan was struck down by fever and died within two weeks, at the age of 36. Her family continued to support girls' education in Hong Kong through FES for two more decades. The schools she opened, known as Baxter Vernacular Schools, flourished until 1899, when the FES handed over its work to the Church Missionary Society; they were then renamed CMS Day Schools.

Susan was never married. She was buried in Hong Kong Cemetery.

== See also ==
- Diocesan Boys' School
- Diocesan Girls' School
- Heep Yunn School
- Margaret Johnstone
- S.K.H. St. Peter's Primary School
