= Margaret Johnstone =

English missionary and educator in Hong Kong

Margaret Elizabeth Johnstone (Chinese: 莊思端; 18 May 1851 – 29 September 1909) was an English missionary and educator in Hong Kong.

In the 1860s, Margaret accompanied her father, a widowed army officer, on his posting to Hong Kong. She was enrolled in the English school opened by Susan Baxter and first met her teacher Mary Jane Oxlad (1840–1922) there in 1864. Later Margaret returned with her father to Ireland when his regiment left Hong Kong. After the death of her father, Margaret applied to the Society for Promoting Female Education in the East (FES) to be a missionary. After a period of training, she set sail for Hong Kong in March 1874.

Margaret was assigned to the Baxter Vernacular Schools for Girls in Hong Kong, first assisting Oxlad. After Oxlad was transferred to Japan in 1877, Margaret took over their supervision. In 1880, she started a small boarding school for Chinese girls, which was later moved to the property known as 'Fairlea' on Bonham Road. The 'Fairlea' school provided Christian education for the daughters of Chinese Christians and served as a home for poor and orphaned girls, a training ground for day-school teachers, and the mission house of the FES missionaries. In 1891, the Diocesan Home and Orphanage transformed into a boys' school and the girls from DHO were accepted as students in 'Fairlea' by Margaret. Margaret also played an important part in establishing the Diocesan Girls' School in 1900.

To evangelise and foster literacy among women, Margaret and her colleagues worked closely with the Church Missionary Society, in which the FES was dissolved in 1899. By then there were eight schools spread over Hong Kong and Kowloon, including the villages of Stanley, Shau Ki Wan and To Kwa Wan.

In 1906 Margaret suffered a stroke, which obliged her, partially paralysed, to leave Hong Kong. She died in England in 1909. In June 1911, her old students and friends erected a tablet in St. John's Cathedral, on which her missionary work was highly praised.

== See also ==
- Susan Baxter
- Heep Yunn School
- Diocesan Girls' School
- Diocesan Boys' School
- Diocesan Native Female Training School
