= St. Mark's School (Hong Kong) =

Secondary school in Hong Kong

St. Mark's School Chinese: 聖馬可中學
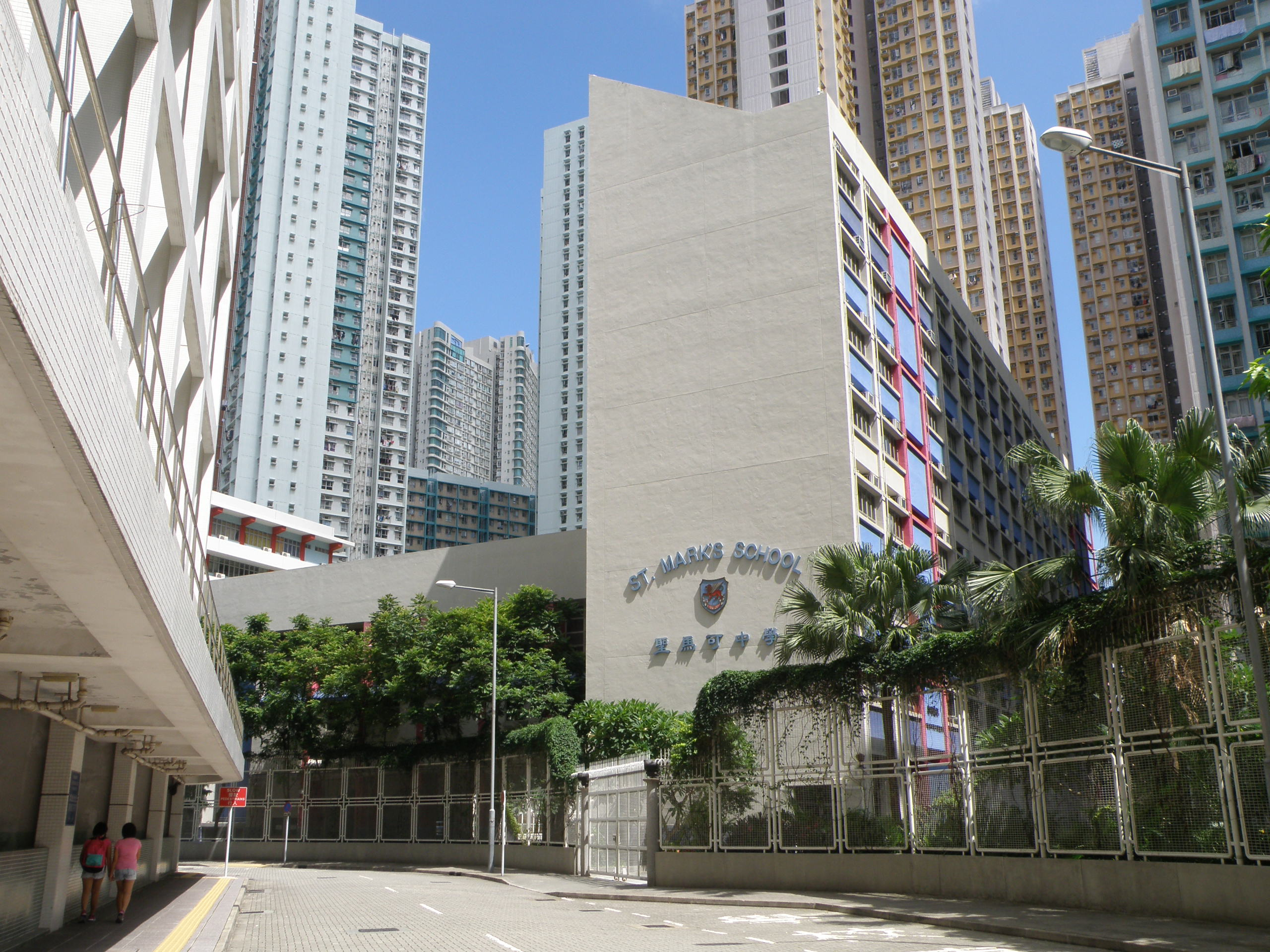

Location
- 18 Oi Yin Street, Aldrich Bay; Shau Kei Wan; Hong Kong; 22.281318°N 114.226516°E

Information
- School type: Aided (Grant School)
- Motto: ΕUΘUΣ ("Straightway")
- Religious affiliation: Christianity
- Patron saint: St. Mark
- Established: 1949; 77 years ago
- Status: Open
- Authority: Sheng Kung Hui
- Chairperson: Dr. Allan Yuen
- Principal: Ms. Stella Chan
- Chaplain: Rev. SIN Yut Fan
- Staff: 56
- Grades: F.1 – F.6 (Equivalent of Grades 7–12)
- Gender: Co-Ed
  - Grade 7: (F.1) 189
  - Grade 8: (F.2) 186
- Average class size: 35
- Language: English
- Classrooms: 32
- Campus: Aldrich Bay
- Campus size: ~5700 sqm
- Houses: Venus, Jupiter, Mercury, Mars, Saturn
- Colour: Navy Blue
- Telephone: +852 2560 1262
- Website: https://www.stmarks.edu.hk/web/

St. Mark's School
- Traditional Chinese: 聖馬可中學
- Simplified Chinese: 圣马可中学
- Literal meaning: St. Mark School
Transcriptions
Standard Mandarin
- Hanyu Pinyin: Shèng Mǎkě Zhōngxué
Yue: Cantonese
- Jyutping: sing3 maa5 ho2 zung1 hok6

The St. Mark's School (Chinese: 聖馬可中學) is an Anglican co-educated band 1 school located in the Eastern District of Hong Kong. It was admitted to the Grant School council in 1955 after being established in 1949.

== History ==
St. Mark's School was founded at Glenealy in Central in 1949, first known as St. Paul's English PM School. The founding principal was Mr. Leslie Wah-Leung Chung (鍾華亮) (1917–2009) . It was renamed St. Mark's School in 1953, and moved to Shaukeiwan Road in 1956. In 2001, it was relocated to its present site, a brand new building in Aldrich Bay.

In 2009, St. Mark's celebrated its Diamond Jubilee.

The parish church of this school is the Holy Nativity Church.

== School logo and motto ==
The logo of St. Mark's School is a lion with outstretched wings, a symbol of the undaunted spirit of St. Mark. The ribbon beneath the feet of the winged lion carries the Greek word "ΕΥΘΥΣ", which translates as "straightway" in old English.

"Straightway" has a two-fold meaning. Character-wise, it means one should be honest, frank, and morally upright. It also means straight-away, doing at once what should be done now and not putting it off.

== Academics ==
St. Mark's School adopts English as the medium of instruction; with the exception of several subjects, the entire curriculum is taught in English. These exceptions are: Chinese Language, Chinese Literature, Chinese History, and Religious Education. St. Mark's School is one of the 22 members of the Council of Subsidised Schools in Hong Kong.

== Extracurricular activities ==
There are five houses in St. Mark's School, namely Venus, Jupiter, Saturn, Mars and Mercury. There are various inter-house sports competitions over the academic year as well as the annual Sports Day and Swimming Gala. In addition, students are encouraged to enrol in many different student societies and to take up numerous leadership roles.
