= Edward Aldrich =

British Army engineer (1802–1857)

- Born: 30 December 1802
- Died: 24 November 1857 (aged 54); Marylebone, London
- Military career
- Allegiance: United Kingdom
- Branch: Board of Ordnance
- Years of Service: 1826–1854
- Rank: Colonel
- Service number: 591
- Unit: Corps of Royal Engineers
- Commands: Spain, 1839; CRE, Syria, 1840–1841; CRE, Hong Kong, 1843–1847
- Campaigns: First Carlist War, 1839; Melilla; Syrian War, 1840–1841; Sidon; Beirut; Acre; Expedition to Canton, 1847
- Awards: Naval General Service Medal (1847), 'Syria'

Colonel Edward Aldrich (30 December 1802 – 23 November 1857) was a British military engineer, architect and surveyor of the Corps of Royal Engineers who carried out the first detailed survey of Palestine together with John Symonds, RE, known as the 1840–41 Royal Engineers maps of Palestine, Lebanon and Syria.

== Career ==
Aldrich was specially employed in command in Spain, Syria, and Hong Kong.

During the Carlist War in Spain in 1839, he was employed in obtaining the Carlist surrender of Melilla fortress to the Queen of Spain.

In Syria, Aldrich commanded the Royal Engineers from the first landing on 11 September 1840 to the 12 December—operations at Djouni, Tyre; bombardment and assault of Sidon; bombardment and capture of Beirut, and subsequent surrender to him, while in charge of detachments of Royal Marines and Turkish troops, of a division of the Egyptian Army (3000) with their encampment and 24 pieces of artillery; the bombardment and capture of Acre. From 13 December he was employed on the Staff in the advance to Jaffa and from 30 September 1841 as Commanding Royal Engineer until the evacuation of Syria by British troops. For his efforts he received the Naval General Service Medal (1847), 'Syria' clasp.

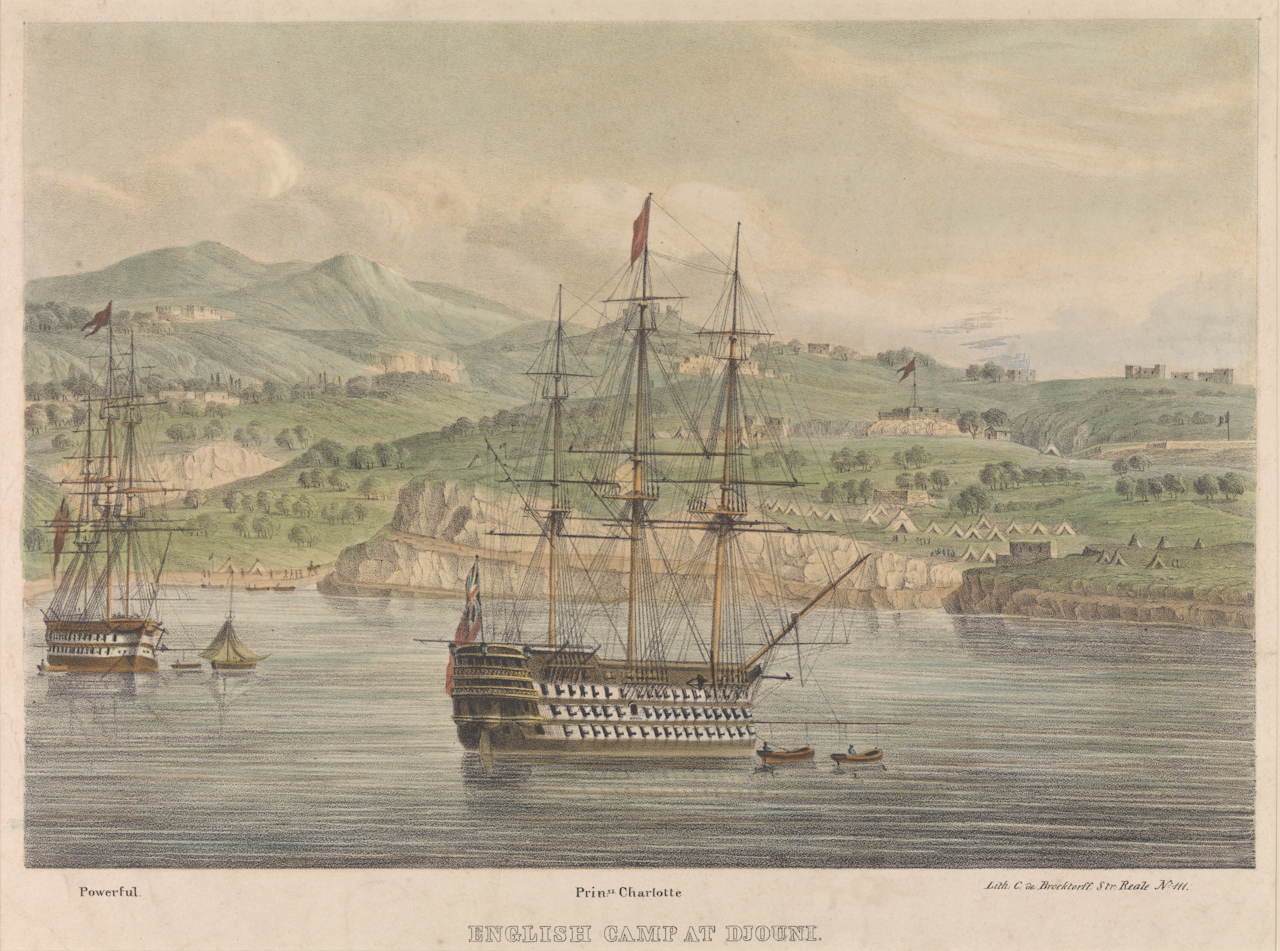
HMS Powerful and Princess Charlotte at the English Camp at Djouni, near Sidon, in 1840

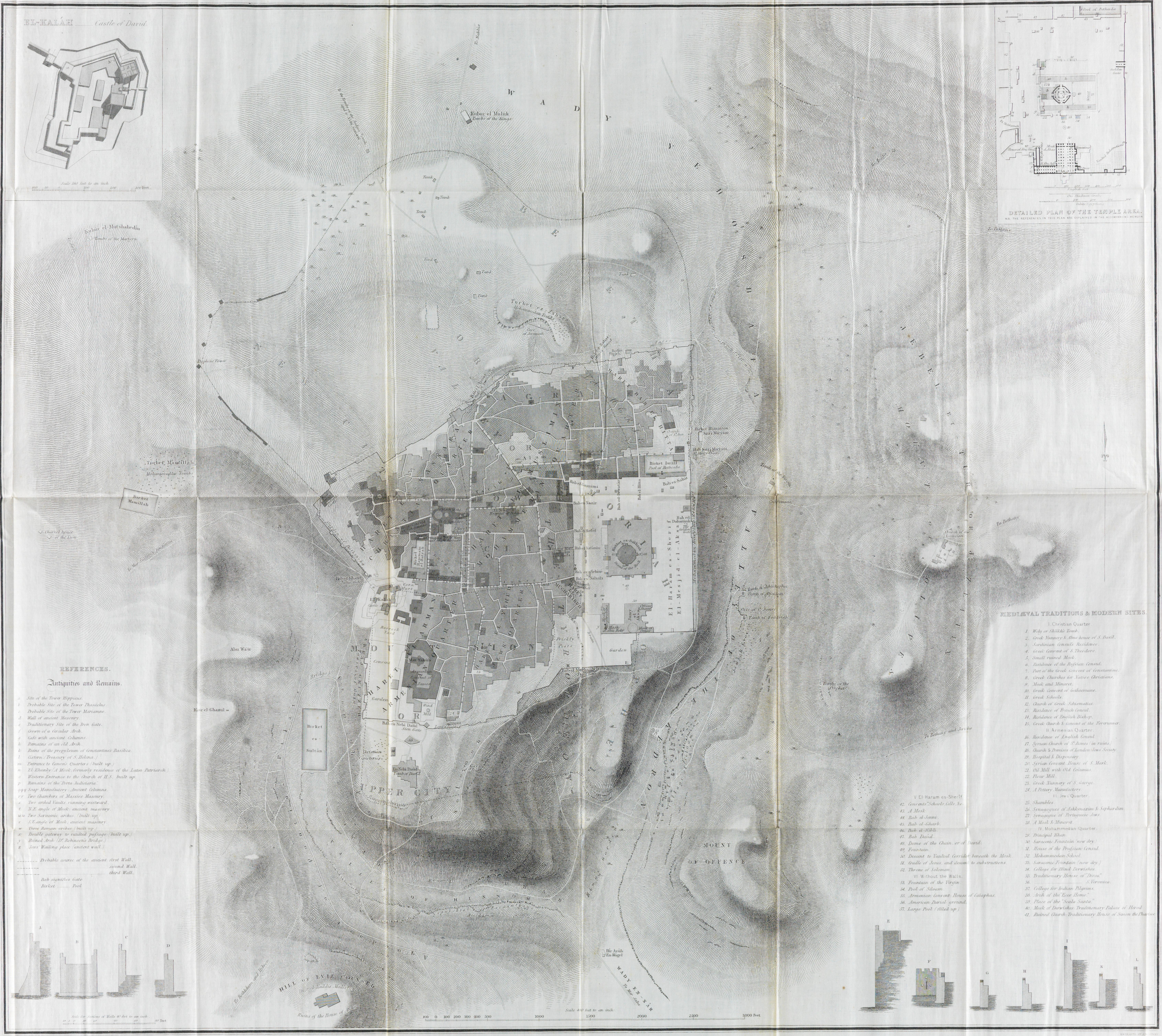
Plan of Jerusalem and environs from Aldrich & Symonds' survey in March 1841

He was assigned to China as the first Commanding Royal Engineer to Hong Kong, from 1843 until withdrawal in 1846–1847. In April 1847 he took part in the combined naval and military expedition to Canton, up the Canton River, charged in command with the assault and capture of seven forts—Whampoa Creek, French Folly, Ronge, Zig-zag, Segment and Shanneen Forts.

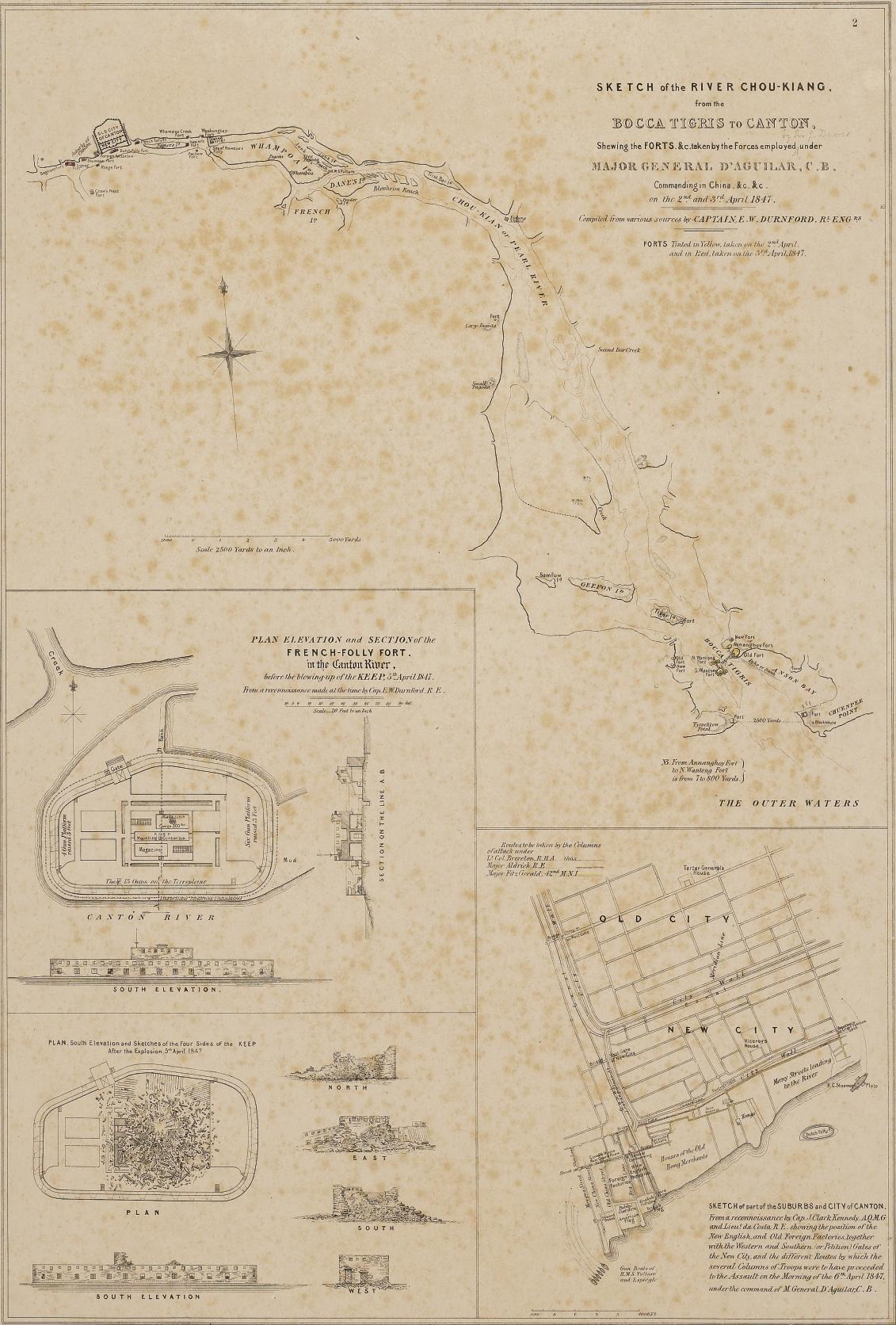
Map of the expedition

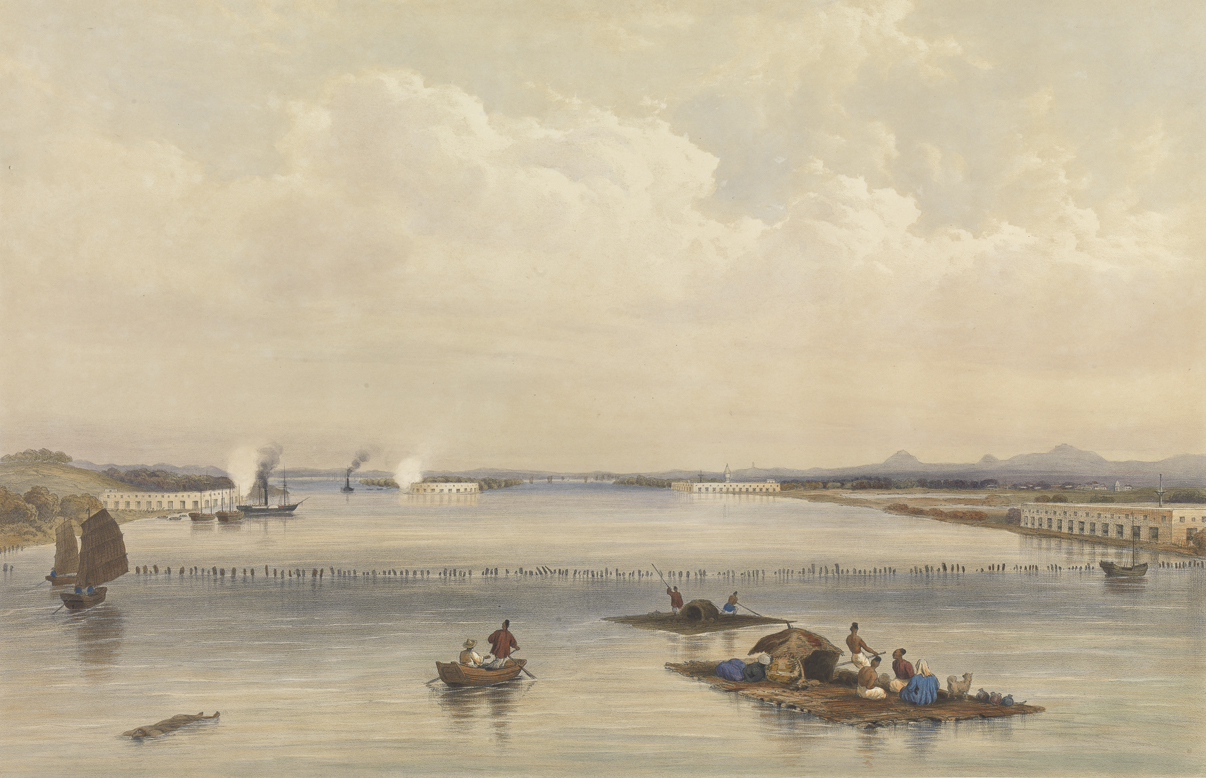
Attacking the batteries near the staked barrier above Whampoa Island

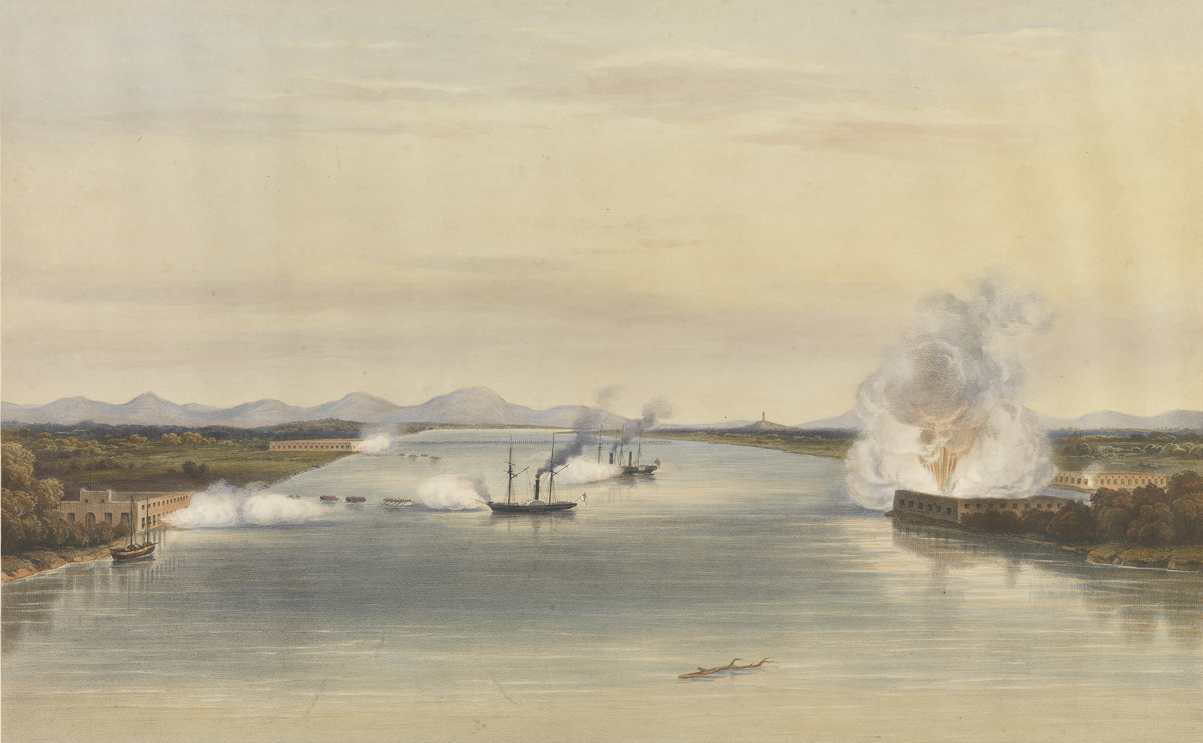
Attacking the forts of Wookongtap and Whampoa Creek, 3 April

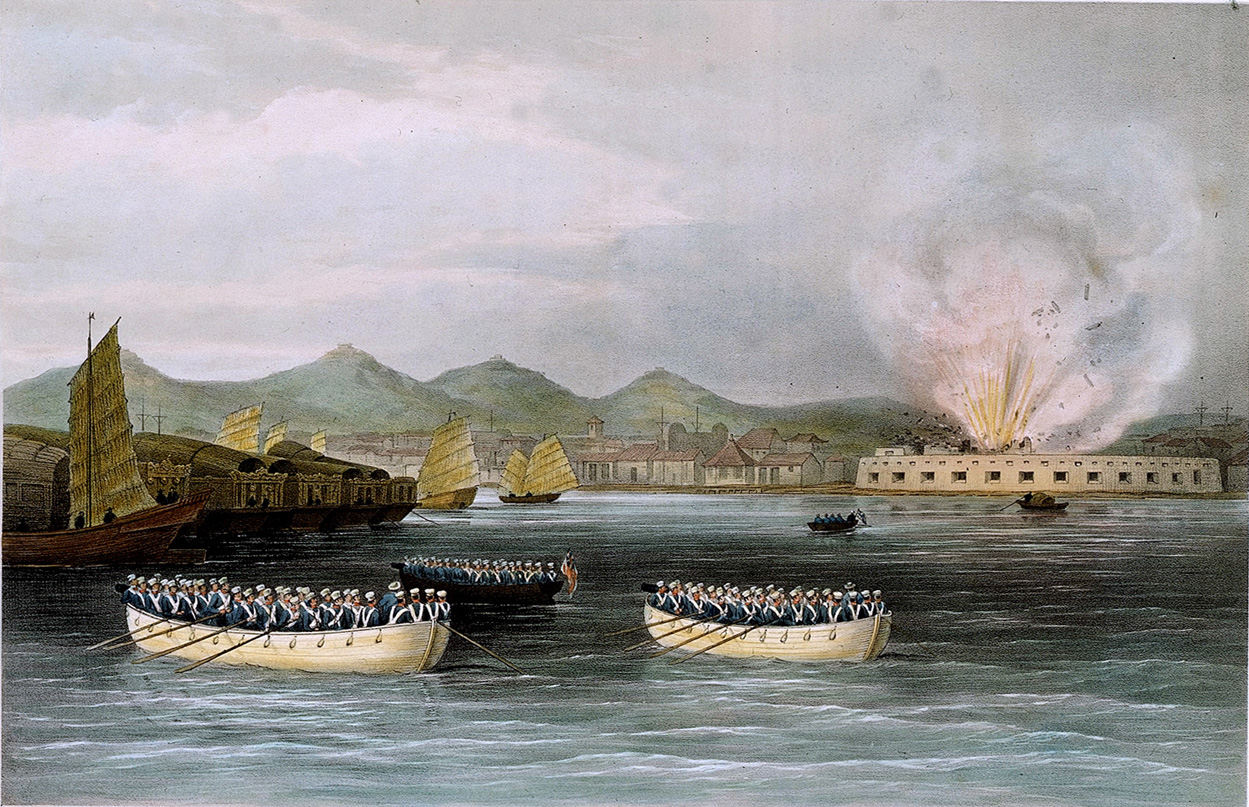
Royal Sappers and Miners blow up the French Folly Fort

Aldrich died at age 57 at Marylebone, London. Aldrich Bay, on the north shore on the Hong Kong Island, is named after him.

== Bibliography ==
- Hawkins, R S (March 1968). "Far Eastern Outpost" (PDF). The Royal Engineers Journal. 82 (1): 37–47.

== Publications ==
- Aldrich, Edward (1849). "Description of the Mat Covering Sheds used at Hong-Kong in the erection of the Ordnance Buildings, and of the mode adopted by the Chinese in transporting and raising heavy Weights for these Buildings" (PDF). Papers on Subjects Connected with the Duties of the Corps of Royal Engineers. 10 (6): 153–155.
