= Grant School (Hong Kong) =

Type of secondary school in Hong Kong

A Grant School is a special type of secondary school in Hong Kong. According to the current legislation, "Grant Schools" refer to "any secondary school which receives subsidies in accordance with the Code of Aid for Secondary Schools and which was, before 1 April 1973, in receipt of grants in accordance with the Grant Code". (Cap 279C) They were established by missionaries and churches in the nineteenth and early twentieth century, and receive grant-in-aid from the government to operate, thus named Grant Schools. Most of the Grant Schools in Hong Kong have good academic achievements.

== Background ==
=== Historical context ===
The emergence of Grant Schools is related to a specific historical context. When the colony of Hong Kong was established as Britain's trading outpost in the Far East, the need emerged for local education: for trade as well as to administer the territory. However the colonial government was not able to provide an adequately high level of education. After the passage of the Elementary Education Act 1870 (33 & 34 Vict. c. 75) by the imperial parliament, which allowed state funding to Church schools, the colonial government followed suit and adopted similar measures to provide public education with limited financial resources.

The resulting 1873 Grant Code is a product of the aforementioned development. It regulates the criteria for admission to the grant-in-aid scheme and the standards of the schools. The government also provides land and gives grants to establish schools. In turn, the duty of administering the day-to-day operation of the schools fell to the missionaries. Grant-in-aid from the government provided only partial financial income for the schools, donations and tuition fees were other sources to finance the schools. The government thus had the Church shoulder the financial and administrative burden of providing education, and in turn the Church had another platform to expand its missionary activities.

The number of Grant Schools peaked at the end of the 19th century, with more than 100 schools receiving grants under the Grant Code. The majority of the Grant Schools by that time were the vernacular schools, which provided Chinese education. Nevertheless, these vernacular schools were criticised by the school inspectors for their appalling academic performance. Students were near-illiterate and could not handle subject knowledge. The government also introduced a parallel "Subsidy" system (using the Subsidy Code) which was less restrictive. (Note: The aim of the Subsidy system had fundamental differences compared to the grant-in-aid system. According to the annual reports of the Education Department, it was to provide a more cost-effective manner of school aid.) Some schools opted for the new Subsidy and dropped the Grant, creating a fall-off in the number of Grant Schools. As a result, the government decided to abandon the Grant system in 1921 except for a few competent schools. For the newly founded schools after 1921, only the qualified ones were allowed to join the Grant system. They were mostly schools giving Western education in European languages. The remaining schools of the Grant system later formed the Grant Schools Council (see below) and continue to operate today.

=== Current situation ===
Since the introduction of universal primary education (1971) and junior secondary education (1978), the practical differences between the Grant Schools and other Subsidized Schools (Note: Subsidized Schools refer to schools which received government aid according to the Subsidy Code. See Background and Note 2 for more information.) has diminished, with the exception of retaining legal distinctions. The Grant Code and Subsidy Code were unified as the Code of Aid (then regarded as "Aided Schools"), where government aid is paid, regardless of the school origin and prestige. But due to their distinguished history and alumni, the Grant Schools in Hong Kong have established themselves as a tier of elite schools in the territory. These schools prefer to preserve their former identities as Grant Schools.

A number of Grant Schools have recently joined the Direct Subsidy Scheme, another funding programme initiated by the government which allows greater freedom for schools to devise the curriculum, and set entrance requirements, and tuition fees, in high-profile partly due to their dissatisfaction with the perceived unfriendly education reform policy. These schools included:

- Diocesan Boys' School
- Diocesan Girls' School
- Heep Yunn School
- St. Paul's Co-educational College
- St. Paul's College
- St. Paul's Convent School
- Ying Wa College

== Timeline ==
- 1873: Frederick Stewart, the Inspector of Schools, submitted for approval of the government a grant-in-aid scheme offering aids to mission schools, subject to certain conditions.
- 1873: The original Grant Code was put into force. The grants were to be paid according to the results of an annual examination on secular subjects conducted by the Inspector.
- 1879: The Grant Code was revised to abolish the conditions that enforced secularism in education. Schools run by the Catholics joined the Grant-in-aid scheme.
- 1893: The Grant Code was revised, offering building grants for "building, enlarging, improving or fitting up" schools.
- 1904: Grant payments by student result was abolished. Grants were then paid according to school inspection reports.
- 1914: In the 1914 Grant Code, grants were paid in the form of capitation grant (for each pupil presented for the examination).
- 1921: Due to the dissatisfaction of school performances and the intention to increase cost-effectiveness, the government removed most schools from the Grant-in-aid list except for a few competent ones.
- 1941: The Grant Code was revised. The new grant-in-aid scheme paid the difference between the approved expenditure and income from school fees and other sources.
- 1941: A provident fund (Grant Schools Provident Fund) for teaching staff was introduced in the revised Code, as one of the earliest teacher welfare benefits in Hong Kong.
- 1941–47: Owing to the outbreak of war, the implementation of the 1941 Grant Code was suspended, and not fully implemented until 1947.
- Late 1950s: The government took gradual steps to unify the Grant and Subsidy systems. The Subsidy system, originally targeted at primary schools, was modified to provide suitable aid for secondary classes.
- 1960: The last member of the Grant system, St. Paul's Secondary School, was placed on the Grant-in-aid list.
- 1965: The White Paper on Educational Policy made a clear recommendation that a unified code of aid shall replace the Grant and Subsidy Codes.
- 1980: The Code of Aid for Secondary Schools was put into force. The Grant Code became defunct.

== Grant Schools Council ==
The Grant Schools Council was formed in 1939 to reflect the interests of the Grant Schools. Consists of the headmasters and principals of the Grant Schools, there are currently twenty-two members. The Council is highly critical of the education reform in recent years, as they see this as an attempt of the government to destroy these "relic institutes from the former dynasty".

Grant Schools Represented in the Grant School Council
School	Year founded	Year admitted to the Grant-in-aid Scheme	Student gender	Remarks
Diocesan Boys' School	1869	1877 (Note: Formerly called Diocesan Home and Orphanage.)	Boys	Joined the Direct Subsidy Scheme (DSS) in 2003
Diocesan Girls' School	1860	1900 (Upon establishment)	Girls	Joined the DSS in 2006
Heep Yunn School	1936	1936 (Upon establishment)	Girls	Joined the DSS in 2011
La Salle College	1932	1932 (Upon establishment) (Note: Formerly called St. Joseph's Branch, Kowloon.)	Boys	
Maryknoll Convent School	1925	1936	Girls	
Marymount Secondary School	1927	1952	Girls	
Methodist College	1958	1958	Co-ed	
Sacred Heart Canossian College	1860	1882 (Note: Formerly called Italian Convent School.)	Girls	
St. Clare's Girls' School	1927	1952	Girls	
St. Francis' Canossian College	1869	1881	Girls	
St. Joseph's College	1875	1879	Boys	
St. Mark's School	1949	1955	Co-ed	
St. Mary's Canossian College	1900	1904	Girls	
St. Paul's Co-educational College	1915	1919 (Note: Formerly called St. Paul's Girls' School.)	Co-ed	Joined the DSS in 2001
St. Paul's College	1851	1876, 1919 (Note: The school was suspended in 1899 and re-opened in 1909 as a non-government school.)	Boys	Joined the DSS in 2002
St. Paul's Convent School	1854	1900 (Note: Formerly called French Convent School.)	Girls	Joined the DSS in 2004
St. Paul's Secondary School	1960	1960 (Upon establishment)	Girls	
St. Stephen's Girls' College	1906	1924	Girls	
Wah Yan College, Hong Kong	1919	1922	Boys	
Wah Yan College, Kowloon	1924	1928 (Note: Formerly called Wah Yan Branch, Kowloon.)	Boys	
Ying Wa College	1818	1918	Boys	Joined the DSS in 2008
Ying Wa Girls' School	1900	1900 (Upon establishment) (Note: Formerly called Training Home for Girls.)	Girls	

== See also ==
- Education in Hong Kong
- List of schools in Hong Kong
