= Miss Hong Kong 2015 =

Beauty Pageant

- Date: 30 August 2015
- Presenters: Carol Cheng, Natalis Chan, Eric Tsang, Amigo Choi
- Venue: TVB City
- Broadcaster: TVB

Miss Hong Kong Pageant 2015 held in TVB City on 30 August 2015. Twelve delegates competed for the title.

== Results ==
=== Placements ===
Final results	Contestant
Miss Hong Kong 2015	No. 1 – Louisa Mak (麥明詩)
1st runner-up	No. 4 – Ada Pong (龐卓欣)
2nd runner-up	No. 9 – Karmen Kwok (郭嘉文)
3rd runner-up	No. 2 – Jessie Ma (馬詩晴)
Top 8	No.3 -Ann Law (羅丹虹); No.5 -Iris Lam (林凱恩); No.11-Amanda Young (楊苡汶); No.12-Sunshine Chu (朱嘉莉)
Top 10	No.6 -Hayton Ng (吳慧堯); No.7 -Sylvia Ng (吳佩欣)

=== Special awards ===
- Miss Photogenic: No. 1 – Louisa Mak (麥明詩)
- Miss Friendship: No. 5 – Iris Lam (林凱恩)

== Delegates ==
The Miss Hong Kong 2015 delegates were:

No.	Contestant	Age	Height	Note
1	Louisa Mak (麥明詩)	23	5'4½"	Winner; Miss Photogenic
2	Jessie Ma (馬詩晴)	20	5'6½"	3rd runner up
3	Ann Law (羅丹虹)	24	5'7"	
4	Ada Pong (龐卓欣)	23	5'4½"	1st runner up
5	Iris Lam (林凱恩)	23	5'4½"	Miss Friendship
6	Hayton Ng (吳慧堯)	23	5'4½"	
7	Sylvia Ng (吳佩欣)	24	5'3"	
8	Michelle Ching (程莉欣)	24	5'6½"	
9	Karmen Kwok (郭嘉文)	23	5'3½ "	2nd runner up
10	Kristi Chan (陳靜儀)	22	5'6"	
11	Amanda Young (楊苡汶)	23	5'6"	
12	Sunshine Chu (朱嘉莉)	23	5'5½"	

== Elimination chart ==
Contestants	Round 1 (Top 12)	Round 2 (Top 10)	Round 3 (Top 8)	Round 4 (Top 4)	Round 5 (Top 3)
Louisa Mak	Advance	Advance	Advance	Advance	Champion
Ada Pong	Advance	Advance	Advance	Advance	1st runner-up
Karmen Kwok	Advance	Advance	Advance	Advance	2nd runner-up
Jessie Ma	Advance	Advance	Advance	Advance	Eliminated
Ann Law	Advance	Advance	Advance	Eliminated	
Iris Lam	Advance	Advance	Advance	Eliminated	
Amanda Young	Advance	Advance	Advance	Eliminated	
Sunshine Chu	Advance	Advance	Advance	Eliminated	
Hayton Ng	Advance	Advance	Eliminated		
Sylvia Ng	Advance	Advance	Eliminated		
Michelle Ching	Advance	Eliminated			
Kristi Chan	Advance	Eliminated			

== Judges ==
Main Judging Panel:

Miss Photogenic judging panel:
Wayne Lai
Simon Yam
William So
Edmond Leung

== Post-Pageant Notes ==
- Louisa Mak unplaced in Miss Chinese International Pageant 2016 in Hong Kong.
