= Louisa Mak =

Hong Kong actress and entrepreneur (born 1991)

- 麥明詩
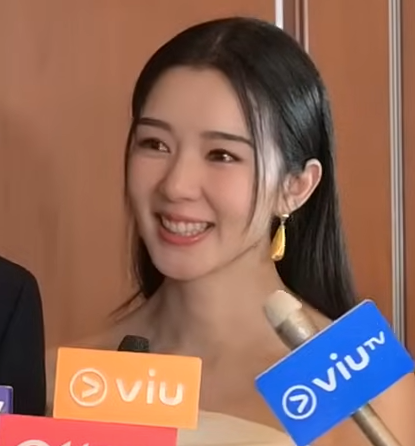
- Mak in March 2024
- Born: Mak Ming-sze; 11 December 1991 (age 34); Australia
- Education: Newnham College, Cambridge (MA)
- Occupations: Actress; host; lawyer; entrepreneur
- Years active: 2015–present
- Spouse: Keith Shing (m. 2024)

Louisa Mak Ming-sze (Chinese: 麥明詩; born 11 December 1991) is a Hong Kong actress, television host, lawyer, and entrepreneur. After graduating from the University of Cambridge with a law degree, Mak made her debut in the entertainment industry by winning Miss Hong Kong Pageant in 2015. She starred in Patrick Kong's romance film L for Love L for Lies too (2016), as well as TVB drama series Line Walker: The Prelude and My Ages Apart (both 2017), before receiving a nomination for Most Improved Female Artiste in the 2018 TVB Anniversary Awards with her performance in legal drama series OMG, Your Honour (2018). Mak also served as one of the co-hosts of the TVB talk show Young And Restless from 2017 to 2019.

Mak withdrew from the entertainment business in 2019 and worked as an associate at McKinsey & Company after she was called to the bar in New York. She left McKinsey in 2022 and co-founded Project Melo, a company that focuses on youth empowerment, in the same year. She was also appointed as a director of Legendary Education in 2023.

== Early life and education ==
Mak Ming-sze was born on 11 December 1991, in Australia, to a middle-class family. Her father was a chemistry teacher and had been the vice principal of Sheng Kung Hui Lam Woo Memorial Secondary School, while her mother was an occupational therapist. She has an elder brother. In 1994, when Mak was three years old, her family moved to Hong Kong. She grew up in Ma On Shan and attended a nearby kindergarten in her neighbourhood. She then attended Diocesan Girls' Junior School, an elite school in Hong Kong, and achieved excellent academic results. During this time, Mak also began to learn ballet, piano, and singing, earning ABRSM Grade 8 in both piano and vocal music. She was a member of the school's choir. In 2003, she was selected to participate in a space camp programme in Alabama, United States, and was selected to welcome Chinese astronaut Yang Liwei on behalf of Hong Kong. After graduating from primary school, Mak continued her studies at Diocesan Girls' School. In 2007, Mak travelled to the United Kingdom with her family and visited King's College, Cambridge. She decided to study there. Although Mak was interested in history, she decided to choose science subjects as they offered a higher potential for achieving good grades. She took a total of ten subjects and obtained straight A's, the highest attainable score, along with thirteen other candidates in the 2009 Hong Kong Certificate of Education Examination.

Mak moved to Crowthorne, Berkshire, and attended Wellington College for her matriculation, to acclimate herself to the British academic environment prior to her university studies. Following the completion of her A-Levels in 2011, Mak read law at Newnham College, Cambridge. During her time at Cambridge, she participated in rowing, and established the Hong Kong and China Affairs Society, serving as the society's president. In 2014, Mak graduated with a Bachelor of Arts (later promoted to Master of Arts by seniority in 2018) in law, with upper second class honours. She then took and passed the New York Bar Examination in February 2015, and was called to bar in November 2018.

== Entertainment career ==
=== 2015–2016: Winning Miss Hong Kong ===
Mak participated in the Miss Hong Kong 2015 beauty pageant contest hosted by TVB, describing her motive as "seeking uniqueness in an ordinary life" and "finding a way to accentuate her own traits and characteristics". Her academic achievement and status as having received a perfect score in the Hong Kong Certificate of Education Examination garnered media attention, earning her the nickname of "10A Miss Hong Kong". Mak became a fan favourite and successfully advanced through the preliminary round in July, securing a place among the final twelve contestants. During the contest finals on 30 August, she delivered a speech challenging the imposition of traditional Chinese feminine virtues on women. She received over 50% of the votes from the audience and emerged as the champion, also receiving the Miss Photogenic special award. The following year, Mak represented Hong Kong in the Miss Chinese International Pageant 2016, but she was eliminated in an early round before making it to the top five.

=== 2016–2017: Early entertainment career ===
After winning the title of Miss Hong Kong, Mak engaged in negotiations with TVB but declined their initial offer of a ten-year contract, instead opting to sign as an artist for five years, with a mere HK$1,600 (USD$205) of guaranteed monthly wage and no fixed quotas for acting jobs. In 2016, she debuted onscreen as a host of the English-language lifestyle information television programme Dolce Vita on TVB Pearl, and went to Rio de Janeiro, serving as a guest reporter for TVB during the 2016 Olympic Games. The same year, she hosted the travel programme A Starry Home Coming, which documented Mak's return to and tour of her alma maters, Wellington College and the University of Cambridge. However, the programme became embroiled in controversy when The Tab, a Cambridge student publication, reported that Mak and her camera crew were causing a scene at the Cambridge Spring Ball by attempting to take advantage of the free alcohol, and was escorted out of the ball for failing to provide press passes. Mak later refuted these rumours in an interview with The Standard, asserting that they had applied for approval weeks before the shoot and that the filming had proceeded smoothly, while criticising The Tab as a tabloid that was not taken seriously by Cambridge students. She was also invited by director Patrick Kong to make her acting debut and star in his romance film L for Love L for Lies too later in the same year, where she assumed the second female lead role of Si Ting, the sketchy best friend and younger sister of a pair of lovers played by Stephy Tang and Wilfred Lau.

In June 2017, Mak made her television debut in the TVB gambling-themed mystery thriller series Bet Hur as Dorothy To, the granddaughter of Lau Siu Ming's character who was unaware of her family's dark history. She also lent her voice for the protagonist Jailbreak in the Cantonese dub of the American animated film The Emoji Movie. Mak subsequently experienced a career breakthrough by co-hosting talk show Young And Restless, alongside Crystal Fung and Luk Ho Ming. The show garnered positive viewership, and Mak received a nomination for Most Popular TV Partnership along with Fung at the TVB Anniversary Awards in the subsequent year. In September, Mak took on the role of Cherry Yeung, one of the five undercover agents working under an inspector played by Michael Miu, in the espionage thriller series Line Walker: The Prelude. In November, she appeared in another supporting lead role in the comedy series My Ages Apart as Sung Kai Kai, an unconfident young girl who was entangled in a love triangle with her sister and a wealthy playboy played by Anjaylia Chan and Dickson Yu.

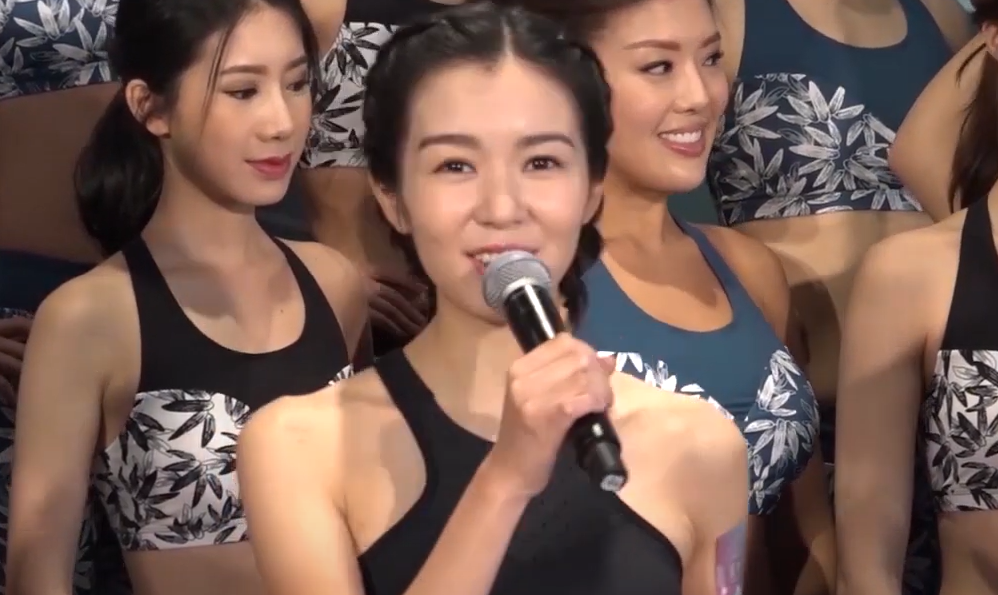
Mak (center) at a press conference of Miss Chinese International Pageant 2019

=== 2018–2022: Breakout and fade out ===
Mak secured a lead role as Helen Ha, a rookie solicitor confronted by the harsh realities of the legal profession, in the 2018 legal drama series OMG, Your Honour. Screenwriter Lee Sin described the role as "tailor-made" for Mak, aligning with her real-life experiences and personality, and she was consulted by the crew regarding the specifics and jargons of the legal profession on set. She received a nomination for Most Improved Female Artiste in the 2018 TVB Anniversary Awards with her performance. Following the production, she was in talks with TVB about penning a legal drama screenplay. She also made a minor appearance in Patrick Kong's film A Beautiful Moment as an MK girl. In early 2019, Mak hosted two travel programmes, I Go to School By Bike and Holland Fun. The former documented Mak's participation in a charity bike ride from Hong Kong to Cambodia, during which she sustained injuries and was hospitalised in Guangxi, China. Later that year, Mak pursued a career change and engaged in negotiations with TVB, resulting in a modification of her contract from a packaged contract to a special contract that only required one show per year. Mak's final role with TVB was that of Megan Yim, the blind daughter of a struggling assassin portrayed by Wayne Lai in the 2020 action thriller series Death By Zero. She gradually stepped away from the entertainment industry in the 2020s, and concluded her contract with TVB in 2022, announcing that she would not return as an artist and expressing that she was going on a different direction with the company.

In 2022, Mak took on the role of Emma So, the sole female lead in the business-themed mystery thriller web series Chasing the Times. She had been introduced to producer Jonathan Chik through a mutual friend the previous year, and Chik noticed the similarities between Mak and a character in his latest project, leading him to offer her the role. Mak agreed on the spot after reading the script and took a twenty-day leave from her job to participate in the filming of the web series.

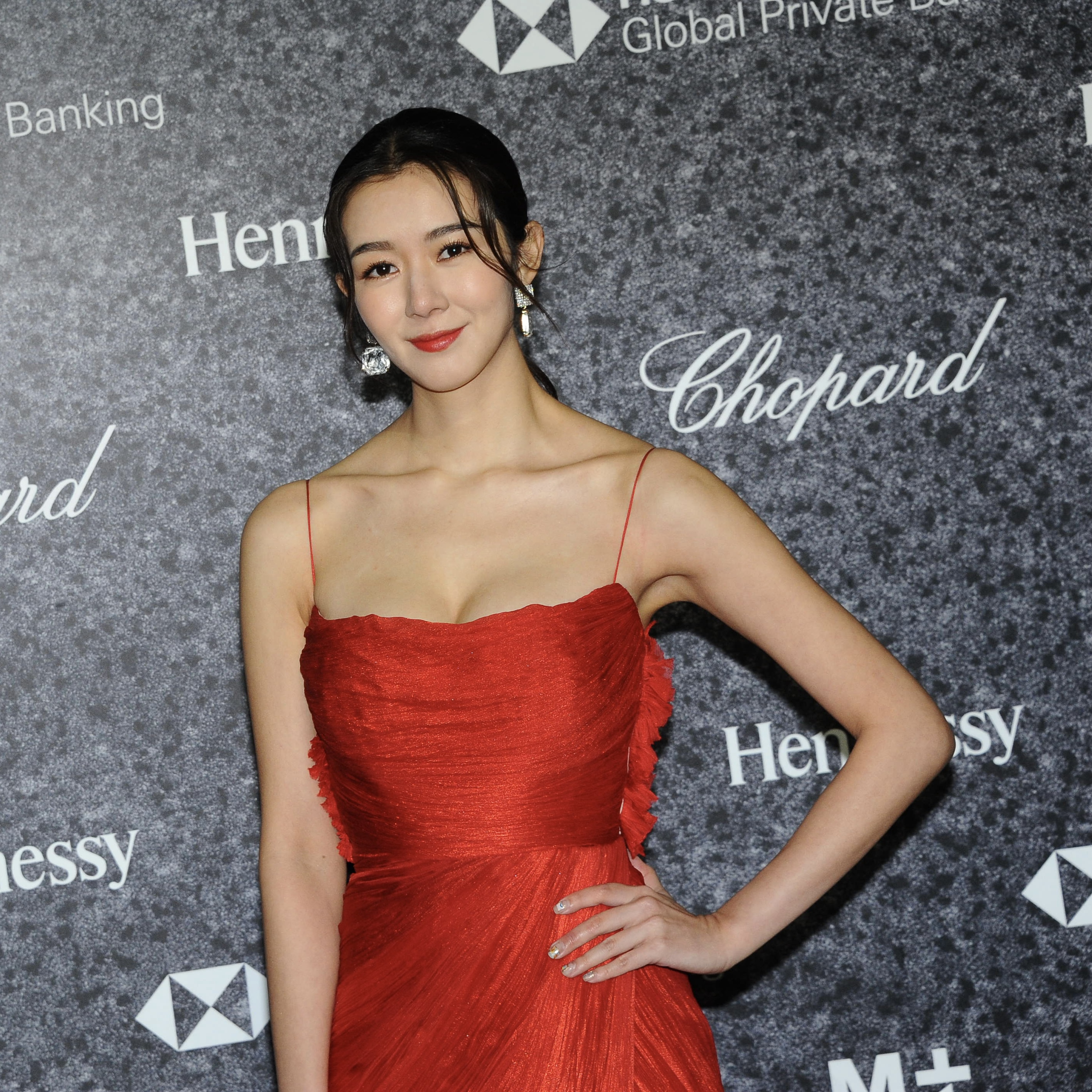
Mak at a business event in January 2024

== Business career ==
Mak embarked on a career transition and joined McKinsey & Company as a junior associate in 2019, being stationed in Taiwan in early 2020 and specialising in business consultation. She later returned to Hong Kong and was promoted to the position of engagement manager, before departing from the consulting firm in 2022. She co-founded Project Melo, a youth empowerment company, in the same year. In 2023, Mak assumed a directorial role at Legendary Education, a publicly listed education company. She appeared as an interviewee in the video documentary series EA Exam about Hong Kong education produced by YouTube channel Trial & Error in the same year, with the footage later edited and released as the 2024 documentary film Once Upon a Time in HKDSE.

== Personal life ==
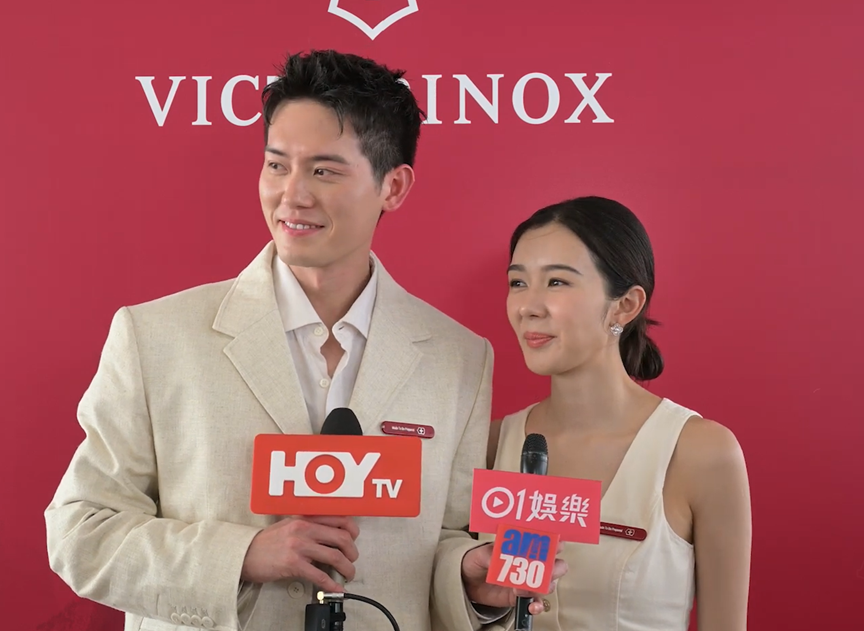
Keith Shing (left) and Mak being interviewed in July 2024

Mak had dated disbarred barrister Jo Lam for three years, before breaking up in 2016. In 2022, Mak was rumoured to be in a relationship with television host and former pilot Keith Shing, and she confirmed their relationship during a business event on 30 October 2023. Breaking with traditional gender roles, Mak, as the female, proposed to Shing, the male, and the couple became engaged on 30 January 2024. They registered for marriage in Australia in late February, and held their wedding ceremony, along with a poon choi feast, at Shing Uk Tsuen, Yuen Long, on 23 March. The couple gave birth to a son in March 2025.

Mak is a devout Christian, and actively advocates for feminism. She is also highly critical of socio-political issues. She participated in and voiced support for the 2014 Hong Kong protests, while expressed strong criticism against the controversial selection of University of Hong Kong pro-vice-chancellor and the Beating of Ken Tsang, denouncing them as assaults on academic freedom and the fundamental principles of the rule of law. Mak has supported for Edward Leung and John Tsang in the 2016 Hong Kong legislative election and 2017 Hong Kong Chief Executive election, respectively.

== Filmography ==
=== Film ===
| Year | Title | Role | Notes/Ref. |
|---|---|---|---|
| 2016 | L for Love L for Lies too | Si Ting (詩婷) | |
| 2017 | The Emoji Movie | Jailbreak | Cantonese voice dub |
| 2018 | A Beautiful Moment | May | |
| 2019 | The White Storm 2: Drug Lords | Police officer | |
| 2024 | Once Upon a Time in HKDSE | Herself | |

=== Television series ===
| Year | Title | Role | Notes/Ref. |
|---|---|---|---|
| 2017 | Bet Hur | Dorothy To (屠若蘭) | Main role |
| 2017 | Line Walker: The Prelude | Cherry Yeung (楊詠) | Main role |
| 2017 | My Ages Apart | Sung Kai Kai (宋佳佳) | Main role |
| 2018 | OMG, Your Honour | Helen Ha (夏心寧) | Main role |
| 2020 | Death By Zero | Megan Yim (閻素之) | Main role |
| 2022 | Chasing the Times | Emma So (蘇瑛) | Main role |

=== Television programmes ===
| Year | Title | Notes/Ref. |
|---|---|---|
| 2016 | Dolce Vita | |
| 2016 | A Starry Home Coming | |
| 2017–2019 | Young And Restless | |
| 2019 | Liza's Online | Guest host |
| 2019 | I Go to School By Bike | |
| 2019 | Holland Fun | |

== Awards and nominations ==
| Year | Award | Category | Work | Result | Notes/Ref. |
|---|---|---|---|---|---|
| 2018 | 2018 TVB Anniversary Awards | Most Improved Female Artiste | OMG, Your Honour | Nominated | |
| 2018 | 2018 TVB Anniversary Awards | Most Popular TV Partnership | Young And Restless | Nominated | With Crystal Fung |
