= Methodist College (Kowloon) =

Secondary school in Hong Kong

- 循道中學
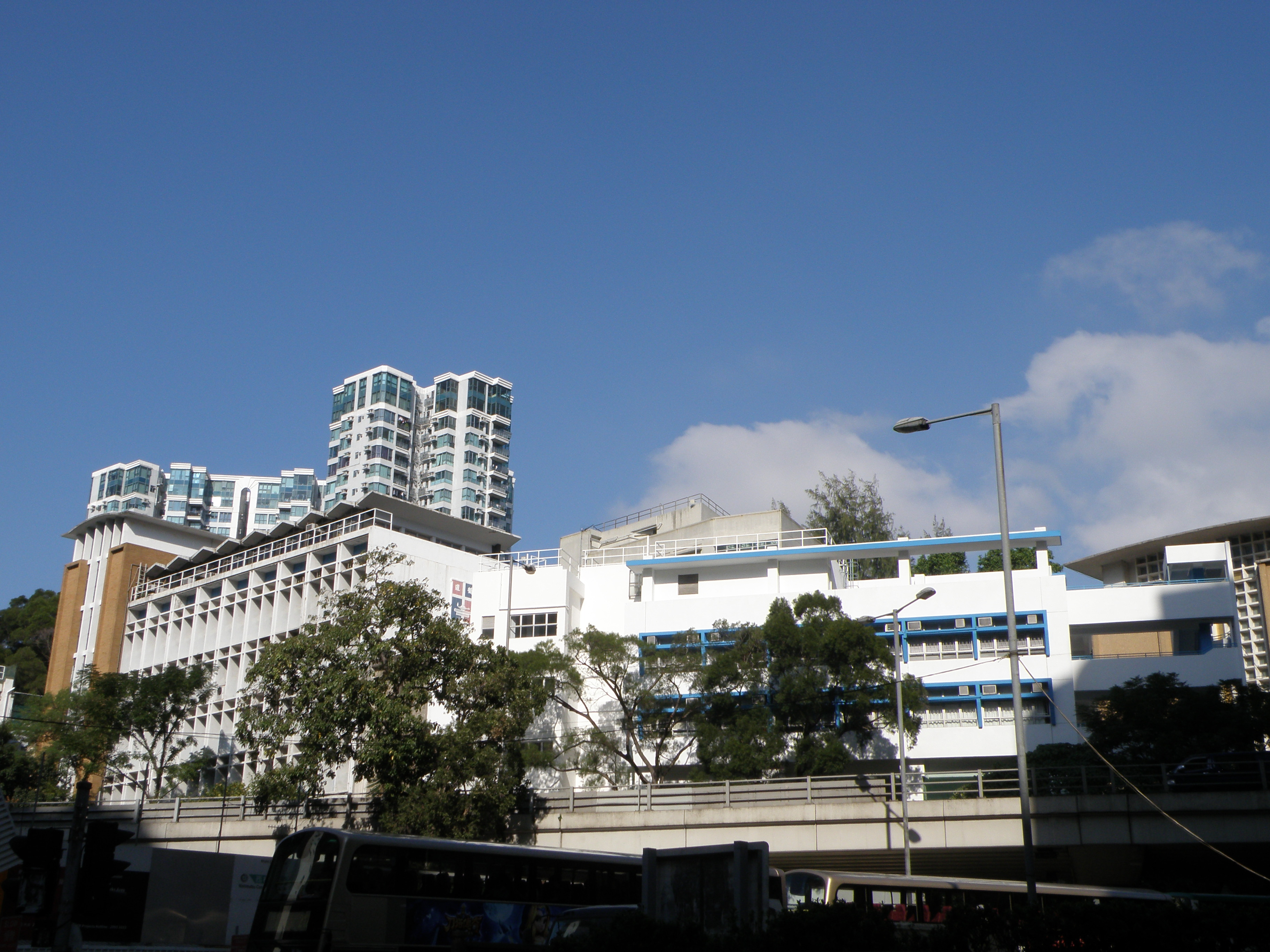

Location
- 50 Gascoigne Road, King's Park; Kowloon; Hong Kong; 22.3090°N 114.1719°E

Information
- Other names: MC; MCKLN
- Type: Grant School
- Motto: Latin: Crede ut Intellegas (Believe in order to know)
- Religious affiliation: Methodist
- Established: 1 November 1958; 67 years ago
- Principal: Dorothy Yick Doi Pei
- Grades: Form 1–6
- Gender: Co-educational
- Language: English
- Houses: Venus; Jupiter; Mercury; Mars; Saturn
- Colours: Red, Blue, White
- Yearbook: Wesley
- Website: www.mckln.edu.hk

Methodist College
- Traditional Chinese: 循道中學
- Simplified Chinese: 循道中学
- Literal meaning: Methodist Secondary School
Transcriptions
Standard Mandarin
- Hanyu Pinyin: Xún Dào Zhōngxué
Yue: Cantonese
- Jyutping: ceon4 dou6 zung1 hok6

Methodist College (MC or MCKLN, Chinese: 循道中學) is a co-educational Methodist Grant School on Gascoigne Road in King's Park, Kowloon, Hong Kong. It was established in 1958 by the then Governor of Hong Kong, Sir Robert Black, K.C.M.G and is the city's oldest Methodist secondary school. The school curriculum uses English as the medium of instruction in all subjects, with the exception of Chinese-related subjects.

== History ==
Methodist College was the first established of eight secondary schools of the Chinese Methodist Church. A group of church leaders conceived the idea of building a secondary school way back in the early 1950s to provide continued education for the graduates of Methodist School. After putting a great deal of effort into the planning and fund-raising, a school building with only 12 classrooms was completed in 1958. The first school year commenced in September 1958 with an enrollment of 312 students in 8 classes ranging from Form 1 to Form 4. There were 12 members on the teaching staff under the leadership of the first principal, Mr. Lee Lin Chi. The original planners envisaged a small, well-equipped and cosy school that would form a close-knit community in which both teachers and students knew each other well.

The college was accorded status as a grant school from the very beginning. This placed the college on equal footing with some of the most established schools in Hong Kong. The college was officially opened on 1 November 1958 by the then Governor of Hong Kong, Sir Robert Black, K.C.M.G. Since 1959, 1 of November has been observed as Founders' Day. The annual Speech Day has been traditionally held on the same day until recent years. The event is now held on the first Saturday of November.

The school's first class of Form 5 students took the Hong Kong School Leaving Certificate Examination (now known as the Hong Kong Certificate of Education Examination) in May 1960 and the first Lower Form 6 began in September of the same year.

As enrollment increased over the years, the range of extra-curricular activities widened. Many clubs and societies were formed. The Student Union came into being and was inaugurated on 4 April 1960, with Lam Kiu Sum, a Form 5 student, as the first president. The Student Christian Fellowship also gradually assumed its present structure. The first school magazine of the college was published in 1961. On the cover was the familiar picture of John Wesley, the founder of Methodism, on horseback. The magazine was also given the name "Wesley" which sums up the spirit of the school. As the school expanded over the years, there was the need for additional classrooms. An annex, which is now the North Wing, was subsequently built adjacent to the basketball court. This became ready for occupation in September 1963. The annex provided the college with 5 additional standard-sized classrooms which were bright and airy. A new standard-sized classroom was added on the second floor of the wing in September 1994.

The college operated 19 classes with 3 streams in each form from Form 1 to Form 5 and 2 each in Lower and Upper Form 6 until September 1976. As a result of the government's expansion policy of secondary education, the college began to take in an additional stream in Form 1. Over the next 5 years, the college gradually expanded to its maximum enrollment of over 900 students in 26 classes with 4 streams from Form 1 to Form 5 and 3 streams in Form 6 and Form 7. With the onset of the 3-3-4 New Academic Structure, the college now runs on 4 streams from Form 1 up to Form 6.

To alleviate the effects of traffic noise, the college installed air-conditioners in some classrooms and special rooms with funds raised by the Silver Jubilee Fund-Raising Campaign in 1983. The number of air-conditioned rooms increased gradually as more funds became available. Now all classrooms and special rooms are air-conditioned. The Lower Hall is also air-conditioned thanks to funds donated by students, parents and alumni in 1996.

To accommodate the additional classes, the library and the geography room were relocated while some rooms were re-constructed in 1987 and 1994. To meet the new demands of the education reforms, the facilities and technology of the school are improved continuously.

Into the new millennium, the college experienced rapid expansion in space. With the School Improvement Project (SIP) of the government, a new extension, now the South Wing, was built on top of the previous football field. Though much delayed, the project was completed in October, 2005, providing three classrooms and special rooms, as well as a spacious Student Activity Centre. Starting from 2002, the vacated campus of the previous Grantham College of Education at 42 Gascoigne Road was handed over to Methodist College and Methodist School for temporary joint tenancy. Renovation was carried out with the college's own funds to turn parts of the otherwise dilapidated premises into active use. The extended campus benefits the college greatly in terms of sports facilities, including a basketball court, an indoor stadium and a fitness gym. The lecture theatre and the Student Activity Room provide good venues for interclass activities, while curriculum diversity is achieved through the English Fun Room and the Pottery Workshop. In 2011, with the relocation of Methodist School to its brand new campus on Wylie Road, the college gained occupancy of its SIP Block, which became the East Wing with 6 classrooms, one brand new Computer Room, 3 split-class teaching rooms and one Student Learning Commons. Senior classes were moved to the East Wing, which released space on the second floor of the Main Building to house a brand new multi-purpose area.

== Curriculum ==
In all classes, English is the medium of instruction for most of the subjects. The school has a strong tradition of using English in most school functions. To enhance students' English, a wide range of activities, like English Activity Day, English Time, Debating Competition etc., are held throughout the year.

=== Foundation years (S1–S3) ===
To lay a foundation for senior secondary studies and train for the core subjects.

English Language, Chinese Language, Mathematics, Integrated Science, History, Geography, Economics, Computer Literacy, Chinese History, Life and Society, Putonghua, Religious Education, Visual Arts, Home Economics, Design and Technology, Music, Physical Education

=== New Senior Secondary (S4-S6) ===
Each student has to study four core subjects and two/ three elective subjects. Students have to take part in different Other Learning Experiences (OLE) as well.

- Core Subjects (4C):

English Language, Chinese Language, Mathematics, Liberal Studies

- Elective Subjects:

Physics, Chemistry, Biology, Economics, Mathematics Module 1, Mathematics Module 2, Business, Accounting and Financial Studies (A), Business, Accounting and Financial Studies (B), Geography, History, Chinese History, Visual Arts, Information and Communication Technology, Chinese Literature, Ethics and Religious Studies.

- Other subjects:

Religious Education, Physical Education, Aesthetic Education

== Extracurricular activities ==
The school has over 50 different student bodies in the form of clubs, societies, organizations and school teams such as choir, orchestra, musical team, debating teams and sports teams for students to take part. There is also a wide range of training courses including musical instruments, foreign languages, art and design, archery etc.

=== House system ===
The school has a house system of five Houses which are represented by a colour and named by the five elements in ancient Chinese philosophy and fortune-telling.

- Venus — Orange
- Jupiter — Green
- Mercury — Blue
- Mars — Red
- Saturn — Yellow

And soon after, the school developed a vertical house system with the names made by the first house captains.

== Facilities ==
The school comprises a Main Building, a North Wing, a South Wing and an East Wing with 24 classrooms, 5 small group teaching rooms, 3 Science Laboratories, a Computer Room, a Multi-media Learning Centre, a Lecture Room, a Library, a Senior Learning Commons, a Visual Arts Room, a Music Room, a Home Economics Room, a Design and Technology Room, an English Fun Room, a Campus TV Studio, a Campus TV Editing Room, a Student Activity Centre, a Student Union Room, a gym, an Open Playground, a Covered Playground, a Canteen and a Hall.

== Principals ==
- Mr. Lee Lin Chi (1958–1965)
- Mr. Watt Hoi Kee (1965–1973)
- Rev. Man Kwok Wai (1973–1980)
- Miss Sito Suk Han Helena (1980–1994)
- Mr. Kan Ki Leung (1994–2005)
- Miss Pang Shuk Mei (2005–2008)
- Miss Wong Pui Yi Emily (2008–2025)
- Miss Yick Doi Pei Dorothy (2025–Present)
