= Aldrich Bay =

Housing area in Hong Kong

Aldrich Bay Chinese: 愛秩序灣
- Housing area
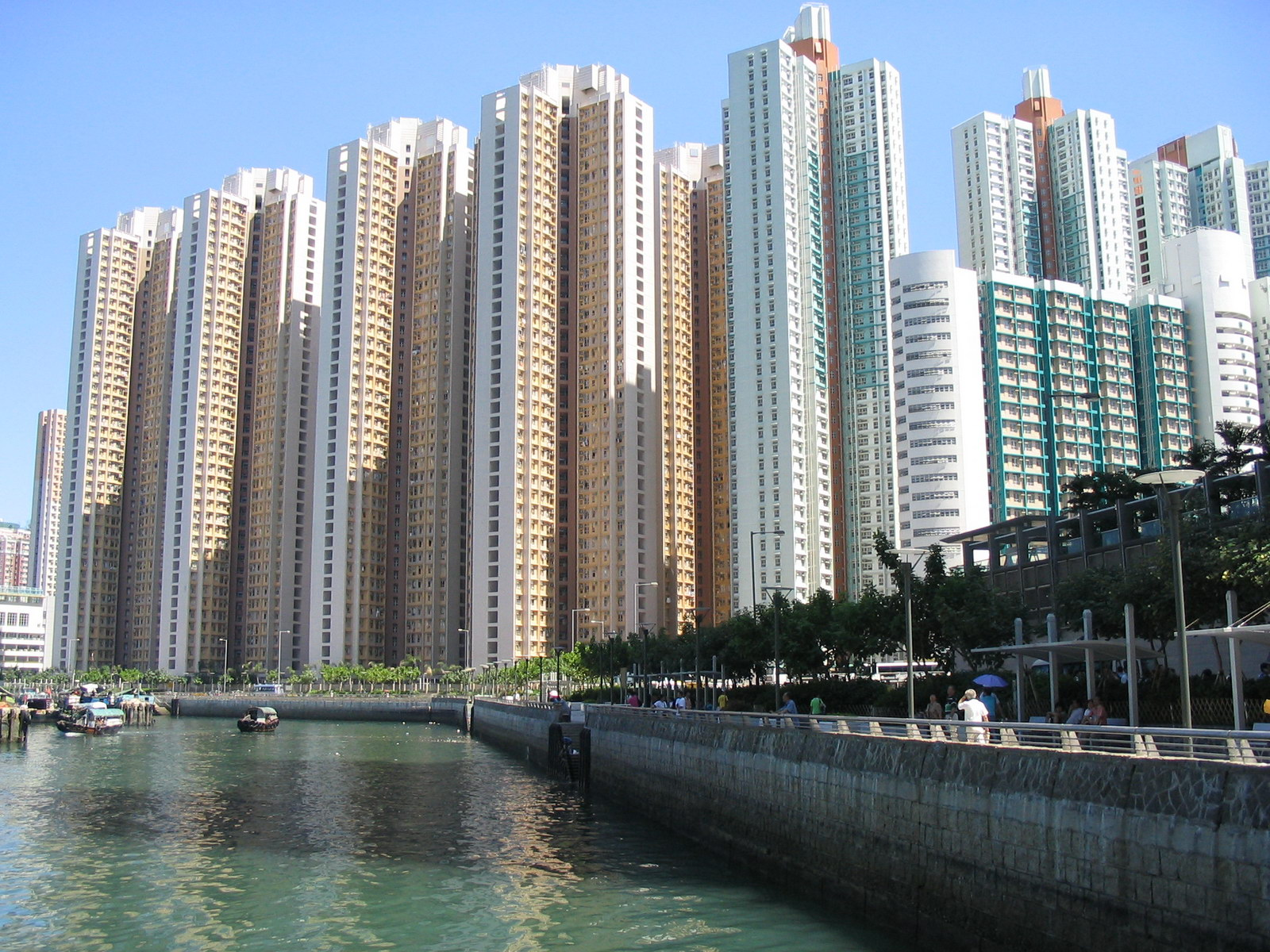
- Aldrich Bay public housing
- Etymology: Major Edward Aldrich
- Location within Hong Kong
- Coordinates: 22.28122°N 114.22822°E
- Country: People's Republic of China
- Special administrative region: Hong Kong
- island: Hong Kong Island
- Area: Shau Kei Wan
- Time zone: UTC+8:00 (HKT)

Aldrich Bay (Chinese: 愛秩序灣), named after Major Edward Aldrich, was formerly a bay in the north shore on the Hong Kong Island, Hong Kong. It is now reclaimed and is a housing area outside the area of Shau Kei Wan, neighbouring A Kung Ngam and Lei King Wan.

Outside Aldrich Bay, it is the Shau Kei Wan Typhoon Shelter. It is not a small community. It contains Oi Tung Estate, Tung Yuk Court, Aldrich Garden and other private housings, with several primary and secondary schools. It is administratively part of the Eastern District.

== Name ==
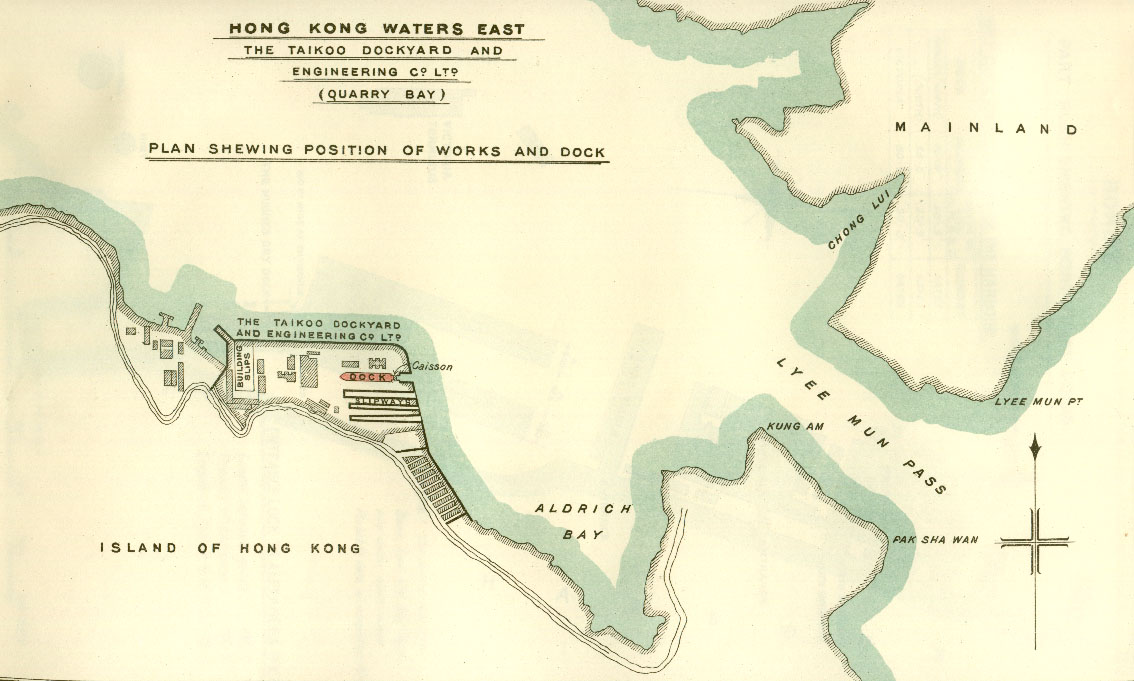
A 1900s map showing Aldrich Bay

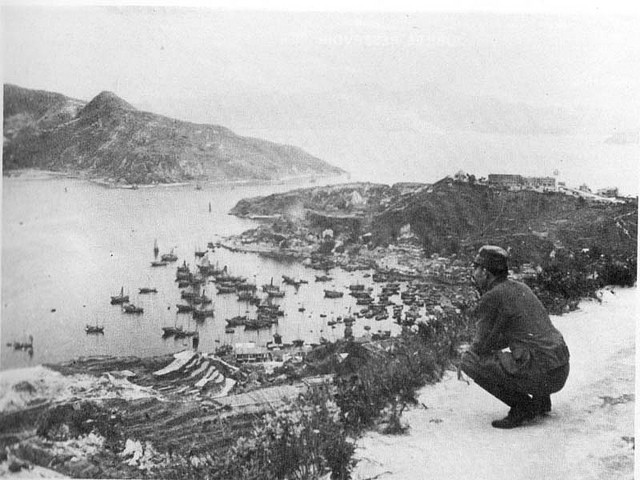
Aldrich Bay in 1941

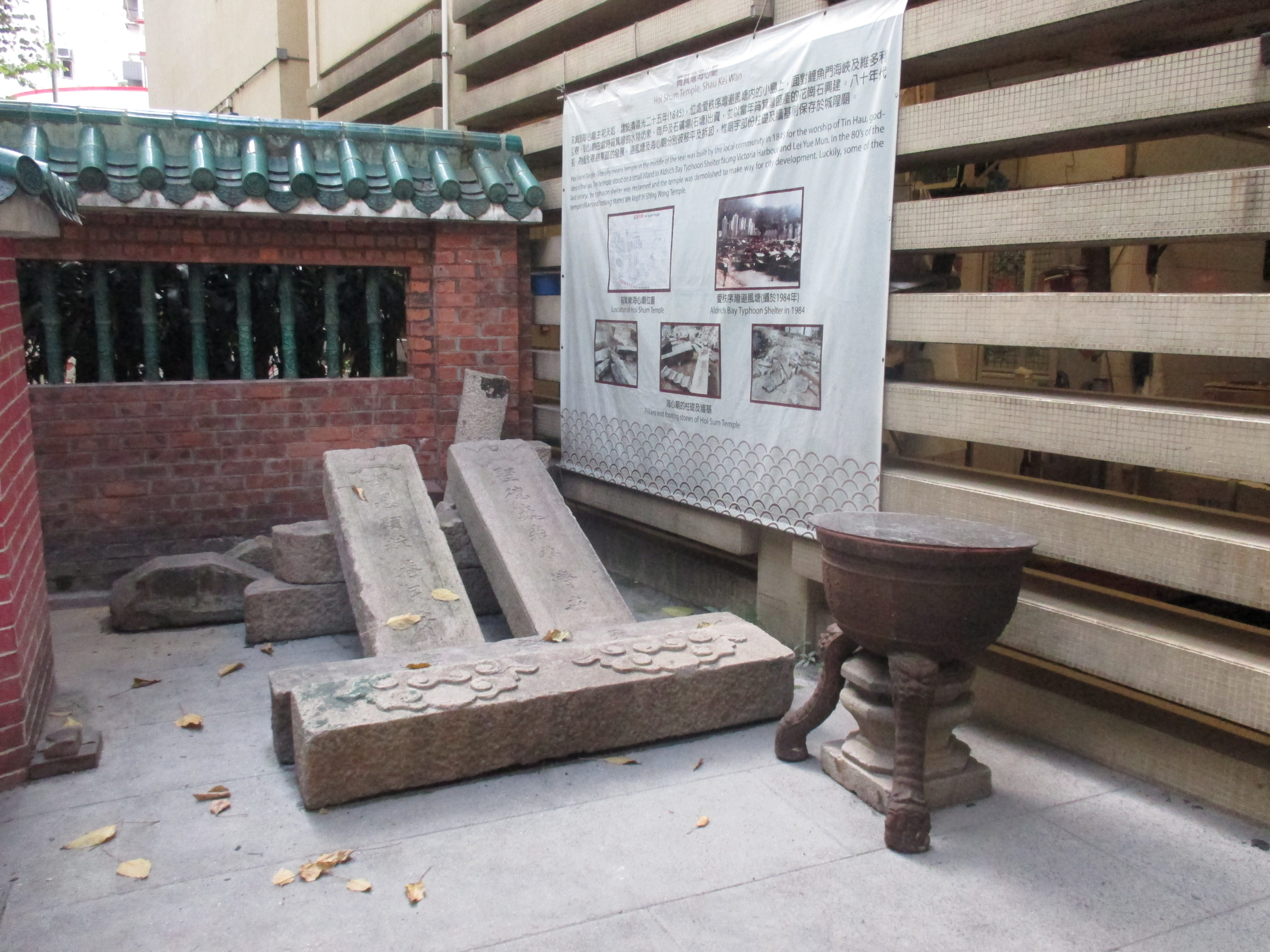
Remains of Hoi Shum Temple (Aldrich Bay) in the courtyard of Shau Kei Wan Shing Wong Temple in 2017

The Chinese transcription for "Aldrich" roughly means "Loving Discipline", matching the achievement of Major Aldrich that bringing good discipline to his force.

== History ==
The Hoi Shum Temple (海心廟; 'temple in the middle of the sea') was built in 1845 on nearshore rocks in Aldrich Bay for the worship of Tin Hau. It was demolished in the 1980s when the Typhoon shelter was reclaimed. Some of the temple pillars and footing stones are now preserved in the Shau Kei Wan Shing Wong Temple.

== Education ==
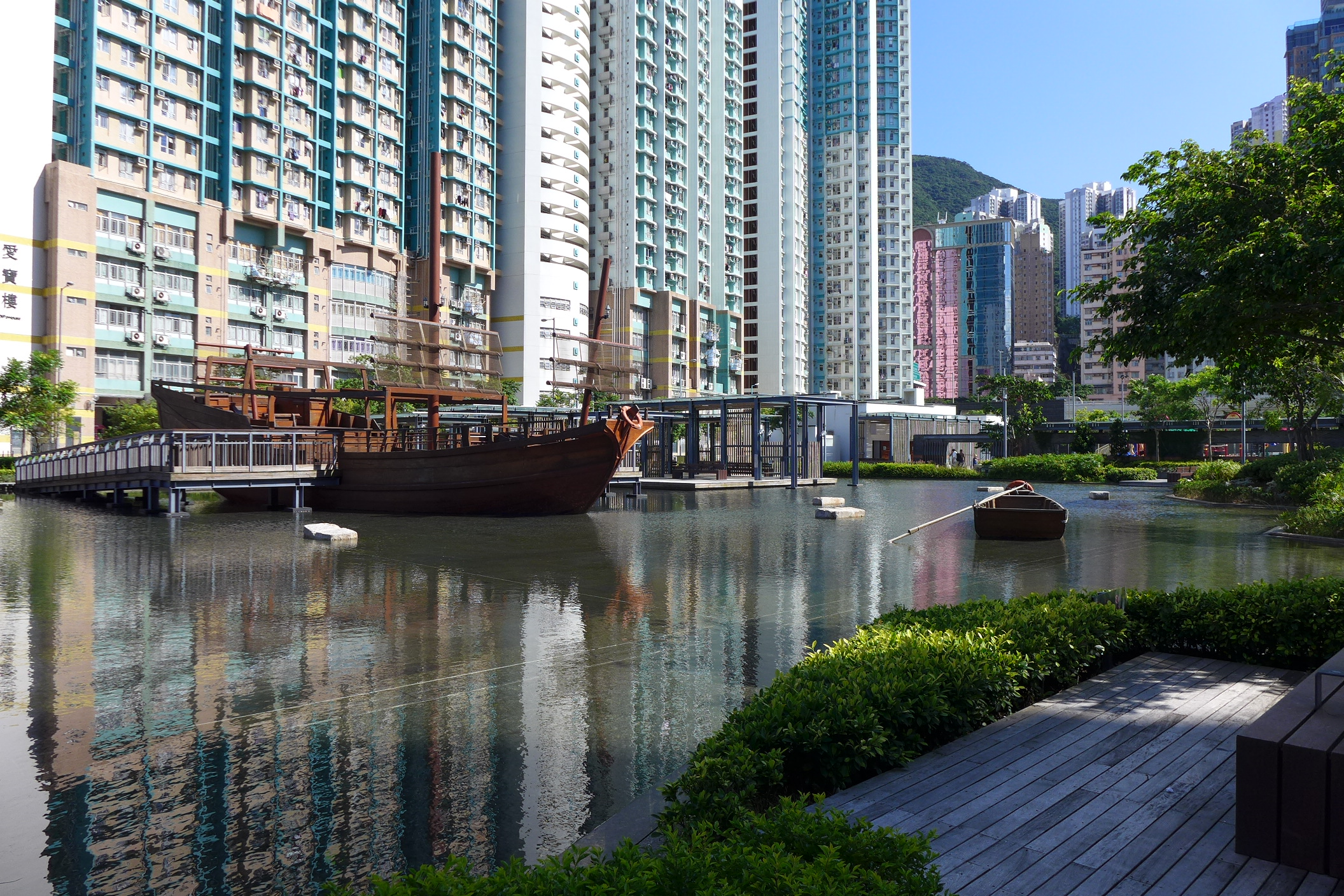
Aldrich Bay Park

School in Aldrich Bay include: Primary schools:

- CCC Kei Wan Primary School (Aldrich Bay)
- Aldrich Bay Government Primary School

Secondary schools:

- St. Mark's School
- Munsang College (Hong Kong Island)

== See also ==
- List of places in Hong Kong
