= Bonham Road Government Primary School =

Primary school in Hong Kong

- 般咸道官立小學
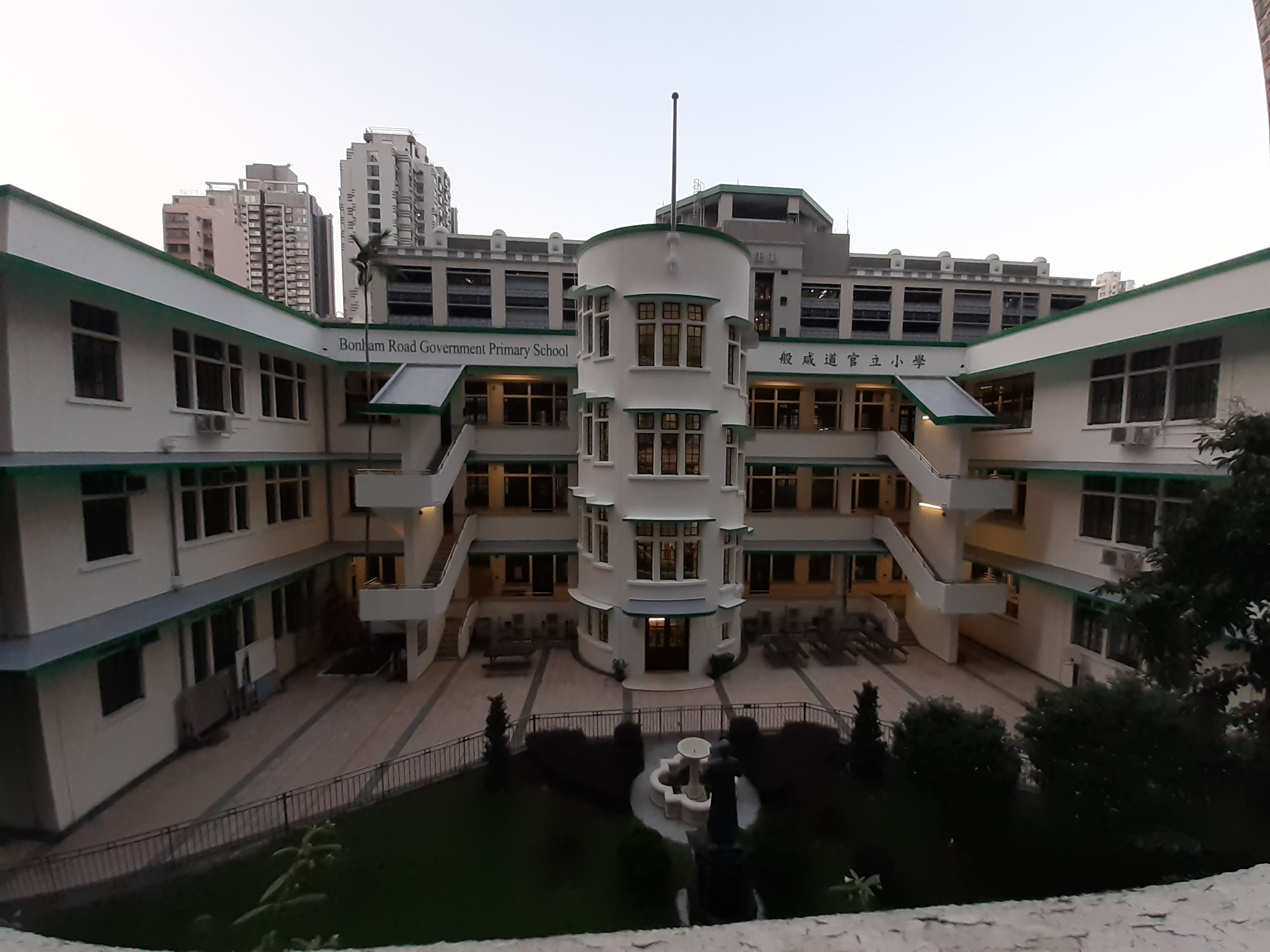
- School building

Location
- 9A Bonham Road, Sai Ying Pun 香港西營盤般咸道9A; Hong Kong
- Coordinates: 22.28453°N 114.143931°E

Information
- Type: Government
- Established: 25 January 2000
- Oversight: Education Bureau
- Gender: Co-educational
- Campus type: Urban
- Website: brgps.edu.hk

Bonham Road Government Primary School
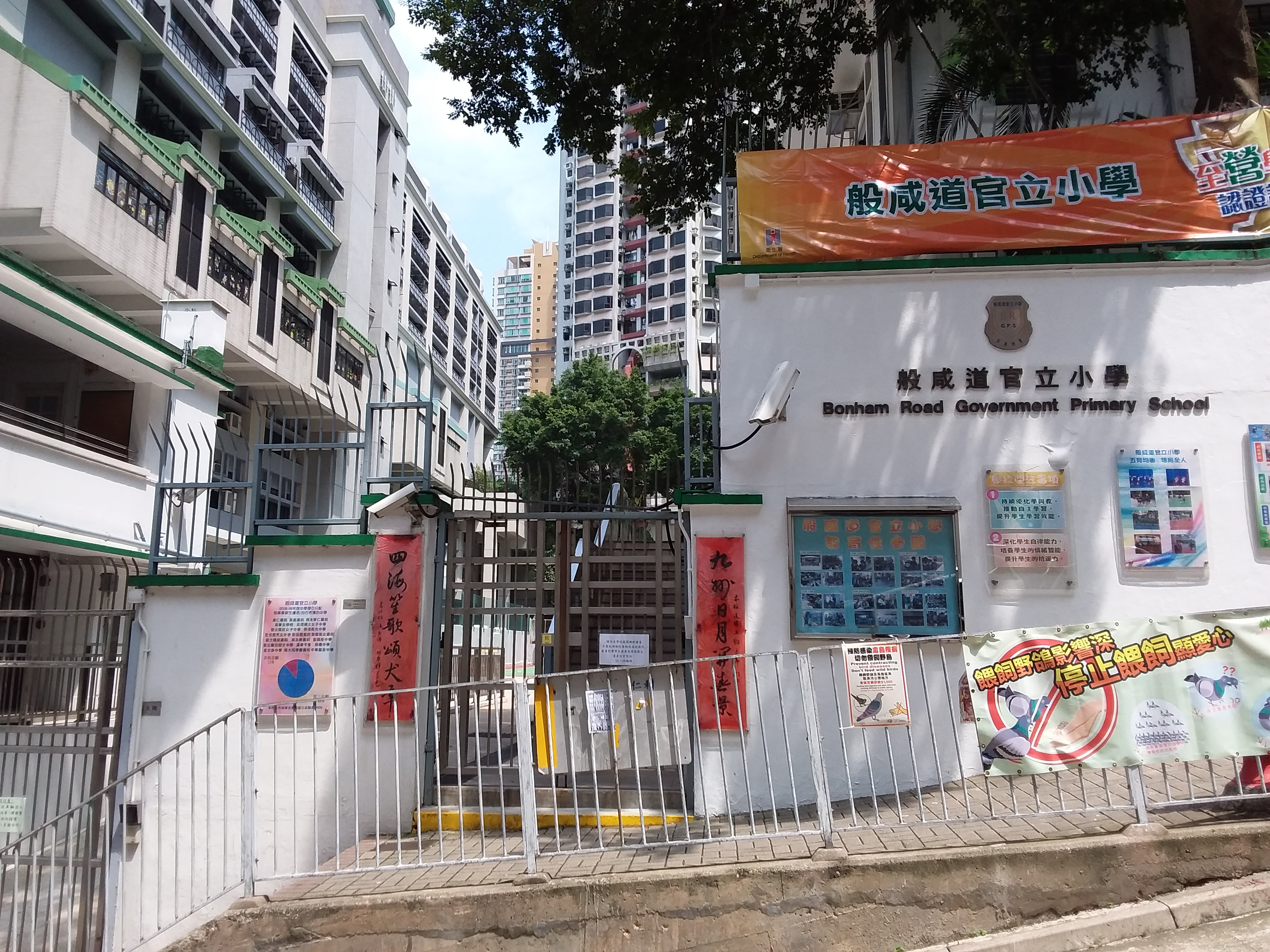
- Entrance with the school's English and Chinese names indicated
- Traditional Chinese: 般咸道官立小學
- Simplified Chinese: 般咸道官立小学
Transcriptions
Standard Mandarin
- Hanyu Pinyin: Bānxián Dào Guānlì Xiǎoxué
Yue: Cantonese
- Jyutping: Bun1 haam4 dou6 gun1 laap6 siu2 hok6

Bonham Road Government Primary School (Chinese: 般咸道官立小學) is a primary school in Sai Ying Pun, Hong Kong. Its school building is a declared monument of Hong Kong since 16 July 2021.

Rachel Yeo of the South China Morning Post wrote that "The building is considered to be a rare surviving example of a structure that served both primary and tertiary institutions."

It is one of multiple schools in Primary One Admission (POA) School Net 11, and it is one of two government schools in the net (the remainder are aided schools, which operate independently but are funded with government money). Neighbourhoods in the net include Central, Kennedy Town, Sai Ying Pun, Shek Tong Tsui, Sheung Wan, and Victoria Peak.

== History ==
The school itself began operations on 25 January 2000, originating from the Li Sing Afternoon Primary School (李陞小學下午校).

The building was constructed in 1940 and 1941. Northcote Training College, later known as Northcote College of Education in the 1970s, was the first occupant. During the Japanese occupation of Hong Kong the police of the Imperial Japanese Armed Forces used the facility as an administrative centre. The training college resumed its use of the facility in March 1946. In 1962 the training college moved out of the building, and United College of the Chinese University of Hong Kong used the building in the period from then until 1971, when the training college moved back in. The college left the building again in 1997, and the primary school began occupying the facility in 2000.

The school building is a declared monument since 16 July 2021.

== See also ==
- Bonham Road
- Diocesan Native Female Training School
- List of schools in Central and Western District
- List of primary schools in Hong Kong
- List of government schools in Hong Kong
