= Joyce Symons =

Hong Kong educator

Joyce Symons seated at her desk

Catherine Joyce Symons CBE JP (née Anderson; 18 August 1918 – 11 June 2004) was an educator, former teacher of the Diocesan Girls' School the leading girls' school in Hong Kong and its headmistress for 32 years.

She was also a Member of the Urban Council, Hong Kong Legislative Council, and the Executive Council of Hong Kong.

== Biography ==
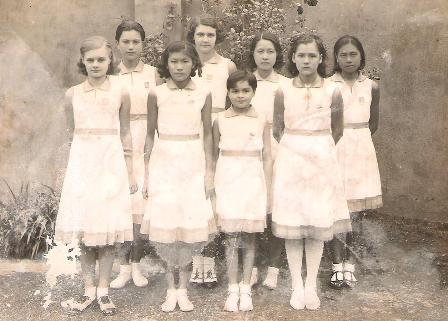
DGS school photo of class prefects c1930: Joyce Anderson is back row first from left

Joyce Anderson was born in Shanghai, China, daughter of Lucy Elanor Perry and Charles Graham (Carl) Anderson, and arrived in Hong Kong with her family at the age of 3. She began what was to become her lifelong involvement with the school in January 1926, when she joined the Diocesan Girls' School (DGS) as a student.

After graduating from the University of Hong Kong in 1939 with a Bachelor of Arts degree in English and Geography, she joined DGS as a geography teacher. Symons became headmistress in 1953, and held that post until her retirement. Symons is credited with turning DGS into the leading girls' school it remains to this day: in particular pioneering all-round education to "nurture broader minds, with music, dancing, sports of all kinds". Symons caused furore in 1967 when she introduced sex education into the school, which was condemned as "evil heresy", and provoked rebellion among conservative parents and ridicule from the wider community.

She was one of three women to be subject of the book Being Eurasian: Memories across Racial Divides, which centred on the difficulties faced by Eurasians growing up in Hong Kong in the 1920s and 1930s.

Symons was bestowed the title 'Justice of the Peace' (J.P.) by the Hong Kong Government in 1965, and was appointed OBE by Queen Elizabeth II 1971.

She was appointed to the Hong Kong Legislative Council in 1972 through 1976, and the first woman appointed to serve on the Executive Council of Hong Kong, in 1976. In 1977, she was appointed member of the oversight committee of the Independent Commission Against Corruption of Hong Kong.

She was awarded an honorary Doctorate of Laws (LL.D) by the Chancellor of the University of Hong Kong in 1978.

She retired in 1985, and published her memoirs entitled Looking at the stars: Memoirs of Catherine Joyce Symons. She died in Surrey, England on 11 June 2004 at the age of 85.

== Published works ==
=== Authored works ===
- Looking at the stars: Memoirs of Catherine Joyce Symons (1996 Pegasus) ISBN 962-8018-02-7

=== As featured subject ===
- Lee, Vicky (2004). Being Eurasian: Memories Across Racial Divides. Hong Kong University Press. ISBN 9789622096707.

== See also ==
- List of graduates of University of Hong Kong
