= S.K.H. St. Peter's Primary School =

Sheng Kung Hui St. Peter's Primary School 聖公會聖彼得小學

Location
- 70 & 88 Hill Road; Shek Tong Tsui

Information
- Type: Aided School
- Motto: 非以役人，乃役於人 (Not to be served But to serve)
- Religious affiliation: Anglican
- Established: c. 1884
- Founder: Susan Harriet Sophia Baxter
- Session: Full-day
- President: Lai Ho Yan Debbie
- Area: St. Peter House:About 850 square meters Cephas House:About 1224 square meters
- Affiliation: Anglican (Hong Kong) Primary Schools Council Limited
- Website: https://www.spps.edu.hk
- Last updated: March 2025

S.K.H. St. Peter's Primary School (Chinese: 聖公會聖彼得小學) is an Anglican primary school in Hong Kong. It was founded in 1884 and consists of two separate school buildings, St. Peter House and Cephas House, with both located on Hill Road in Shek Tong Tsui. The school is managed by Anglican (Hong Kong) Primary Schools Council Limited.

== History ==
In the early days of British Hong Kong, schools had no fixed school building, and schools were set up in private homes. The only commoner school in the Western District was opened in the form of a private school by British Missionary Susan Baxter, with the aim of accommodating poor children who had dropped out of school. The school like many others at the time however rented classrooms as there was no dedicated campus to the school.

The school was initially named “West Point School”, which was later renamed to CMS Days School in 1899 when the school was transferred over to the Church Missionary Society. The school was later renamed "Sai Ying Pun Sheung Kung Hui School" in 1946. In 1954, the school started building a dedicated campus at 88 Hill Road, Shek Tong Tsui, and the school was officially renamed "Sheung Kung Hui St. Peter's Primary School", which the name has been used ever since.

In February 1956, the new school campus was completed. In 1966, the school building was expanded and the number of classes increased to 36. In 2014, the school was awarded a new school building at No. 70 Hill Road and was converted into a full-time primary school from two pre-existing morning and afternoon schools that shared the same building, with 6 classes in each grade, henceforth adopting the "one-school-two-buildings" model. The current principal of the school is Ms. Lai Ho Yan, who took over as the morning school's principal in 2011 and continued acting as the principal for the newly merged school.

== Emblem ==
The emblem of the S.K.H. St. Peter's Primary School is composed of a shield, a crown, a mitre, a crosier and a key. The shield contains the Chinese name of the school and the letters "S.P.S.", which is the abbreviation of the English school name. The numbers "1884" represent the year that the school was officially established.

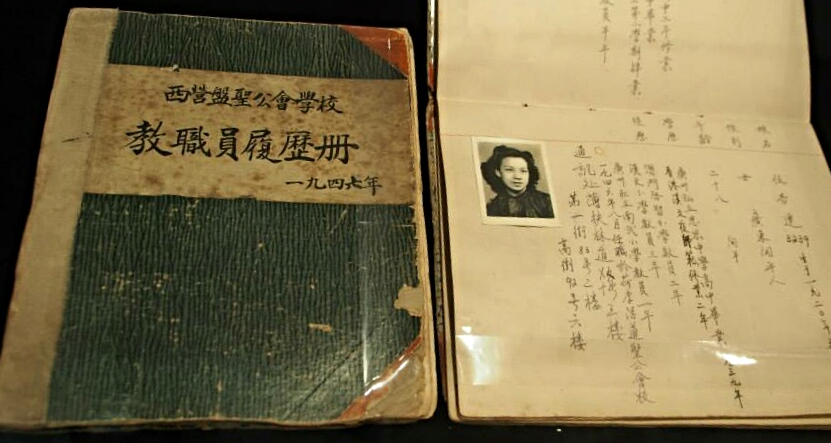
Staff list of the former Sai Ying Pun Sheung Kung Hui School

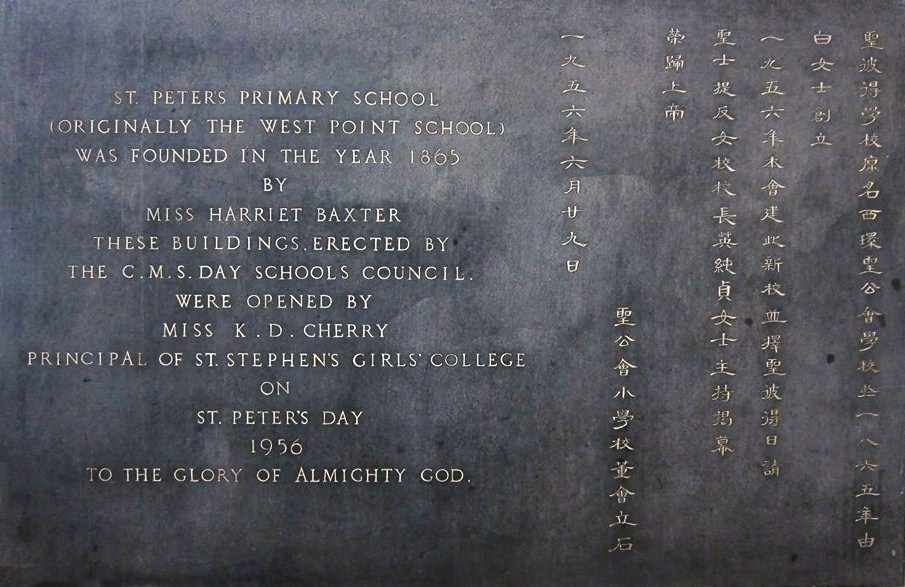
Commemorative stone of the campus at 88 Hill Road

== Campus ==
The entire campus consists of two buildings, which being the St. Peter House at 88 Hill Road and Cephas House at 70 Hill Road.

=== St. Peter House (88 Hill Road) ===
The building was completed in 1956, which at the time was only a four-storey building. In 1966, the school building was expanded and the number of classes increased to 36 in total, including morning and afternoon schools. The school has been operating at this current location ever since. The current teaching facilities in Peter Building include 12 standard classrooms, an auditorium, a school office, a small playground, a music room, a visual arts room, a computer room, a student activity center, a library, etc.

| Main entrance of the building | Exterior look of the building |

=== Cephas House (70 Hill Road) ===
As the school building at 88 Hill Road had become inadequate to accommodate its students, the school took over this school building at 70 Hill Road in 2014. In the same year, the morning and afternoon schools were officially merged and was converted into a single full-time school. Teaching facilities include 24 standard classrooms, an auditorium, a school office, a conference room, a covered playground, a visual arts room, a computer room, a music room, a campus TV station, an English activity room, a multimedia study room, a library, a teacher's room, a small auditorium, etc. In addition, the school roof is currently being rebuilt as an open-air playground/multi-purpose area.

| Main entrance of the building | Exterior look of the building |
