= Diocesan Girls' School =

Secondary school in Hong Kong

Coordinates: 22°18′23.40″N 114°10′22.80″E

Diocesan Girls' School Chinese: 拔萃女書院
- Diocesan Girls' School crest
- 1 Jordan Road, Kowloon; Hong Kong

Information
- Type: DSS, Grant School, primary, secondary
- Motto: Daily Giving Service
- Denomination: Hong Kong Sheng Kung Hui (Anglican Episcopalian)
- Established: 1860; 166 years ago
- School district: King's Park
- Headmistress: Mrs. Stella Lau, SBS, JP
- Grades: P1 – S6
- Gender: Girls
- Campus size: 28,336m^{2}
- Colour: Persian blue
- Website: dgs.edu.hk

Diocesan Girls' School
- Traditional Chinese: 拔萃女書院
- Simplified Chinese: 拔萃女书院
Transcriptions
Standard Mandarin
- Hanyu Pinyin: Bácuì Nǚ Shūyuàn
- Wade–Giles: Pa^{2}-tsui^{4} Nü^{2} Shu^{1}-yüen^{4}
Yue: Cantonese
- Jyutping: bat6 seoi6 neoi5 syu1 jyun2

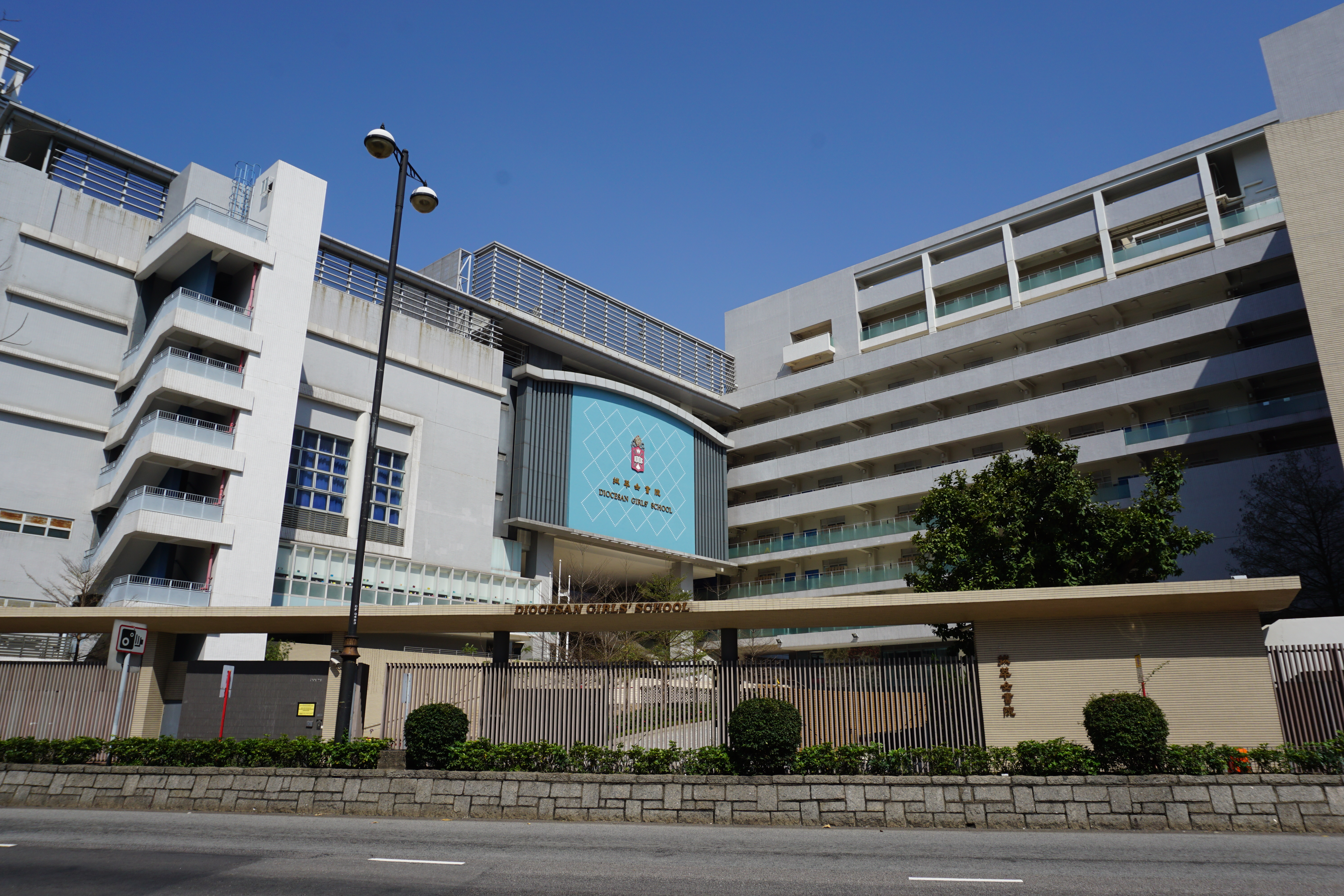
Diocesan Girls' School

Diocesan Girls' School (DGS; Chinese: 拔萃女書院) is one of the oldest girls' schools in Hong Kong. Operated by the Anglican Hong Kong Sheng Kung Hui (香港聖公會) to provide a well-rounded secondary education for girls, it is widely regarded as one of the most prestigious schools in the city.

== Structure ==
DGS is governed by the Council of the Diocesan Girls' School. Having run as a grant-aided school since it was founded, the school changed to an operation in the Direct Subsidy Scheme mode starting with Secondary One classes in September 2005. English is the medium of instruction. As of 2025, DGS accounted for a total of 54 winners of the prestigious Hong Kong Outstanding Students Awards. It ranking first among all secondary schools in Hong Kong, outscoring the next two schools combined. The school is also a member of the G20 Schools group. It has a "feeder" primary school known as Diocesan Girls' Junior School ("DGJS").

== History ==
=== Pre-war ===
There was a Diocesan Native Female Training School founded in 1860 at Bonham Road and Eastern Street on Hong Kong Island. That school was set up by Lady Lydia Smith, the wife of George Smith, who was the first Bishop of Victoria sent by the Society for Promotion of Female Education in the East, a sub-society of the London Missionary Society. At first, it admitted only girls. In 1866, it was renamed Diocesan Female Training & Industrial Schools. Because of financial problems, that school had to restrict its services solely to orphans and destitute girls.

In September 1869, Diocesan Home and Orphanage was established at the same site for English, Eurasian, Chinese and other pupils, occupying the building at the corner of Eastern Street and Bonham Road. In 1894, Diocesan Home and Orphanage became a boys' school and later renamed itself as Diocesan Boys' School and Orphanage since all girls were transferred to Fairlea Girls' School.

In 1899, Diocesan Girls' School and Orphanage was established in Rose Villas on Bonham Road. Diocesan Girls' School and Orphanage first received government financial assistance in 1900 as a Church of England School principally for Eurasian and European girls. It was placed under the grant-in-aid scheme, officially establishing itself as a girls' school.

In 1913, the school moved to its present site at 1 Jordan Road, Kowloon, formerly a rice paddy field. In the 1920s, the school motto, Daily Giving Service, was adopted. During the Japanese occupation in the Second World War, the school was taken over as headquarters of the Japanese Kempeitai until it was re-opened in September 1945 by Ms. Gibbins, then headmistress, who was interned at Stanley camp during the occupation. Immediately upon her release, she hurried back to reclaim the school premises despite difficulty in crossing the harbour, thus saving the building from being looted.

=== Post war ===
In the 1950s, with the closure of the adjacent town-gas depot, the school was able to expand. The old Edwardian edifice was pulled down, and three school blocks were constructed to accommodate the enlarged student body. The school embarked on a large scale school expansion project, and two extension blocks were opened respectively in 1993 and 1996. The new phase of expansion had been completed and was opened officially on 12 January 2007.

In 2005, DGS joined the Direct Subsidy Scheme, in the view to enhance the facilities to meet the demand of increased number of classes. In site redevelopment has been chosen against the use of a new site provided by the Education Bureau, based on cost considerations. The new school campus was designed by architects Palmer and Turner, and the preliminary designs was reviewed by a group of alumni. A fund-raising campaign was launched in 2008 for the redevelopment of the old school campus, which targets on HKD 380 million. In 2009, the classes in DGS were temporarily relocated to 101 Castle Peak Road, Sham Shui Po, whereas DGJS was moved to Tseung Kwan O during the reconstruction. In September 2011, the school returned to 1 Jordan Road upon completion of the new campus.

== Headmistresses ==
| Name | Tenure |
|---|---|
| Elizabeth Skipton | 1899–1921 |
| Miss Ferguson | 1921–1925 |
| H.D. Sawyer | 1925–1939 |
| E.M. Gibbins | 1939–1946 |
| A.W. Hurrell | 1946–1953 |
| C.J. Symons | 1953–1985 |
| Elim Lau | 1985–1999 |
| Stella Lau | 1999 to date |

== Other related associations ==
- St. Andrews Church in the Diocese of Western Kowloon in Hong Kong Sheng Kung Hui is the parish church of DGS.

== List of Top Scorers in Public Examinations ==
DGS has produced 38 perfect scorers "10As" in the history of Hong Kong Certificate of Education Examination (HKCEE) and 14 "Top Scorers" and "Super Top Scorers" in Hong Kong Diploma of Secondary Education Examination (HKDSE). The total number of top performers ranks the 2nd amongst all secondary schools in Hong Kong, second only to St Paul’s Co-educational College (SPCC).

== Alumnae ==
- Rebecca Chan Chung, military nurse and teacher
- Solina Chau, businesswoman
- Irene Cheng, educationalist
- Sarah Liao, politician
- Karen Mok, actress and singer
- Mary Jean Chan, poet, lecturer, editor and critic
- Denise Ho, singer, actress and activist
- Louisa Mak, Champion of Miss Hong Kong Pageant 2015, actress and lawyer

== See also ==
- Education in Hong Kong
- List of secondary schools in Hong Kong
- Diocesan Boys' School
- Diocesan Native Female Training School
