= Heep Yunn School =

Coordinates: 22°19′16″N 114°11′8″E

- Chinese: 協恩中學
- 1 Farm Road, Kowloon; Hong Kong

Information
- Type: DSS, Grant School, secondary
- Motto: In strength and grace we stand united, In faith and love we are committed 協力藉恩, 信主愛群
- Religious affiliation: Christianity - Anglican
- Established: 1936
- School district: Kowloon East
- Headmistress: Bella Leung
- Grades: Grade 7-12
- Gender: Girls
- Average class size: 36
- Area: 11,000 m^{2}
- Color: Navy Blue
- Newspaper: "Gatherine" Chinese: 聚曦
- Yearbook: "Vintage" Chinese: 思齊
- Affiliation: Anglican (Hong Kong Sheng Kung Hui)
- Website: http://www.hys.edu.hk

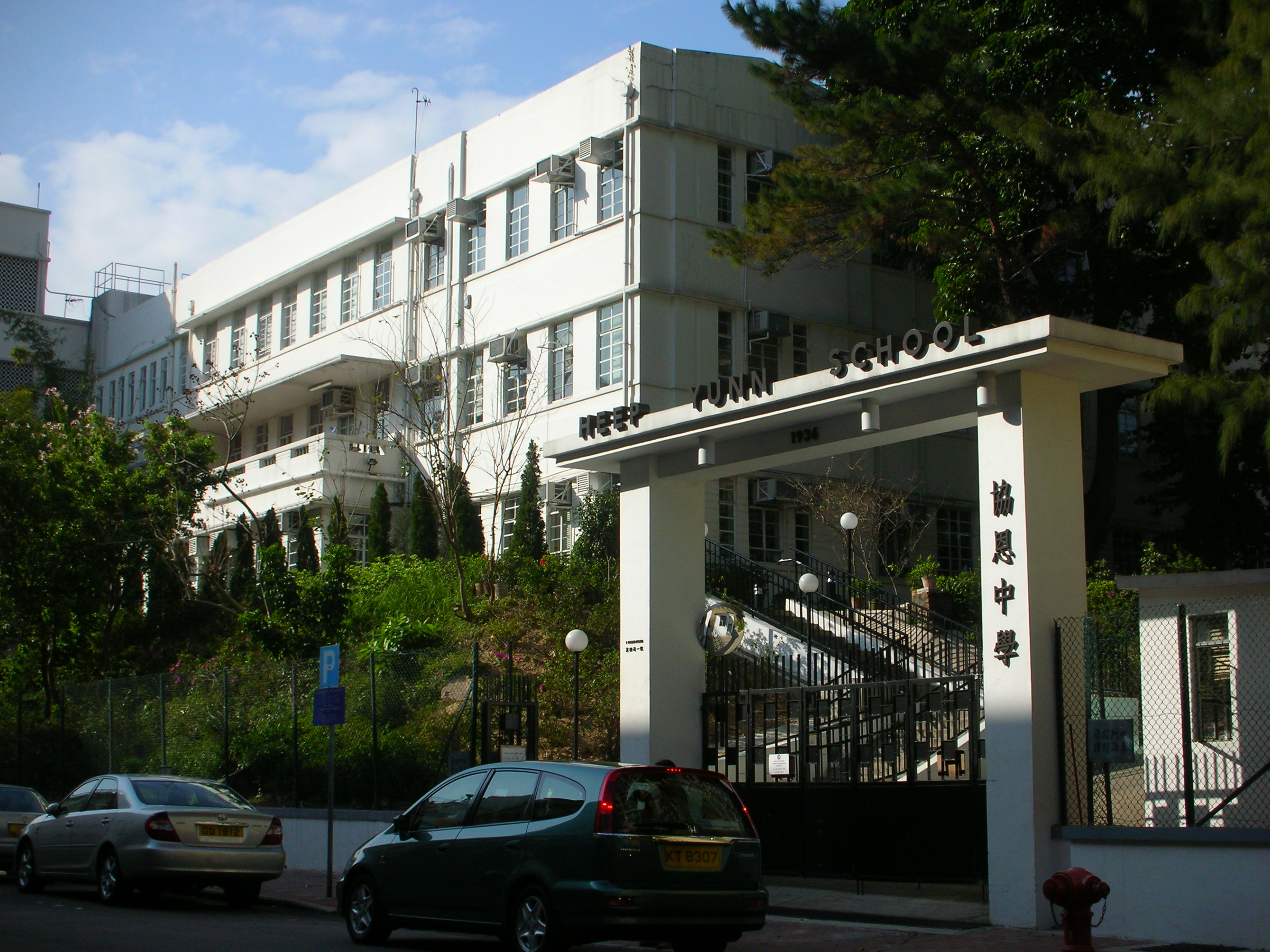
Heep Yunn School

Heep Yunn School (Chinese 協恩中學; abbr. HYS) is an Anglican girls' secondary school founded in 1936. It is in Ma Tau Wai, Kowloon, Hong Kong. The School commenced operation in the DSS (Direct Subsidy Scheme) mode starting from junior forms in September 2012. It is governed by the Council of Heep Yunn School, as established in The Council of Heep Yunn School Incorporation Ordinance (Cap. 1099), which also acts as the sponsoring body of the primary and kindergarten sections.

== History ==
Heep Yunn School was established in 1936 as an amalgamation of two existing Church Missionary Society institutions, the Fairlea and the Victoria Home & Orphanage. The name of the school, "Heep Yunn", means the union of the two schools through the grace of God.

Heep Yunn School continued operating as a Sheng Kung Hui grant-in-aid school for girls until 2012, which the school opted for the Direct Subsidy Scheme instead.

Two buildings of the campus of Heep Yunn School are listed as Grade III historic buildings by Hong Kong's Antiquities and Monuments Office, the Main Building and the St. Clare Chapel.

== House ==
The five houses are named after the school name.

House
Heep
Yunn
Chung
Hok
Hau

== Extracurricular activities ==
The school has over 20 school sports teams, four choirs, three orchestras, debating teams in both Chinese, Mandarin and English, an active drama group and team and over 60 other co-curricular programmes relating to languages, humanity studies, visual art, science, dance, community services and leadership training. The school holds a student-led fun fair every year on the third Sunday of January, where students build stalls from scratch and design games for the public to raise funds.

== School song ==
The school song shares a similar melody with that of Queen's College Hong Kong, and takes its melody from 'Forty Years On' (originally written for Harrow School). It is in Chinese and does not have English lyrics.

== Notable alumni ==
- Rebecca Chan Chung - Decorated U.S. World War II veteran who served as a Nurse with the Flying Tigers (China), the U.S. Army (China) and the China National Aviation Corporation (China and India), with work including flying over the Hump (1942-1948); the first Head (Sister-Tutor-in-Charge) of the Nursing School of the Tung Wah Group of Hospitals, Hong Kong, 1964-1975; 1923 student of Fairlea Girls’ School (a forerunner of Heep Yunn School)
- Stephanie Ho - TVB actress and singer
- Charmaine Sheh - Second runner-up in the 1997 Miss Hong Kong Pageant, TVB actress
- Sheren Tang - Hong Kong actress, 2010 TVB Anniversary Award - Best Actress (No Regrets)
- Elaine Chan (swimmer) - Two-time Olympic swimmer from Hong Kong, specialized in freestyle events
- Ellen Cheung - Pen name Xi Xi, Hong Kong writer
- Leticia Wong - Pro-democracy politician on Sha Tin District Council

== See also ==
- Education in Hong Kong
- List of secondary schools in Hong Kong
