= Maria Elisabetta Renzi =

Italian Catholic Religious Sister, educator and foundress

Blessed Maria Elisabetta Renzi, O.L.S.
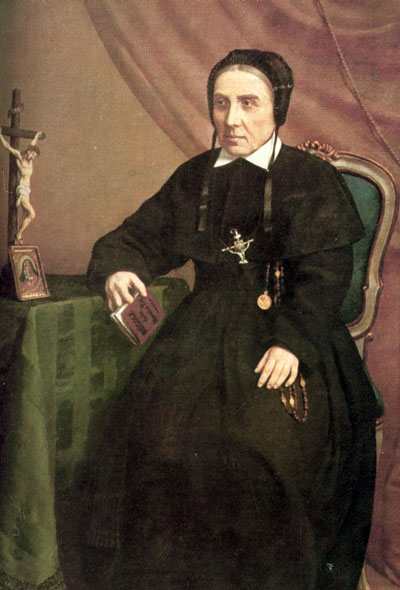
- Between 1850 - 1870.

Virgin and foundress
- Born: 19 November 1786; Saludecio, Rimini, Papal States
- Died: 14 August 1859 (aged 72); Coriano, Rimini, Papal States
- Resting place: Coriano, Rimini, Italy
- Venerated in: Roman Catholic Church (Sisters of Our Lady of Sorrows)
- Beatified: 18 June 1989, Saint Peter's Square, Vatican City by Pope John Paul II
- Feast: 14 August
- Attributes: Religious habit with cap and crucifix
- Patronage: Sisters of Our Lady of Sorrows; Against tuberculosis

Maria Elisabetta Renzi, O.L.S. (19 November 1786 – 14 August 1859) was an Italian Catholic Religious Sister who, in 1839, founded the Sisters of Our Lady of Sorrows, an international religious institute of women dedicated to education.

== Life ==
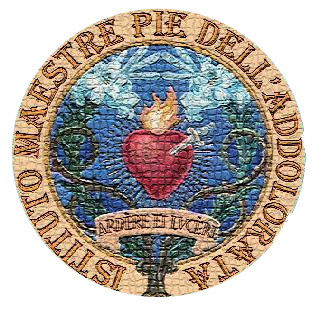
The logo of her congregation

She was born in 1786 in the town of Saludecio, the second child of seven of a prosperous couple, Giambattista Renzi, a respected appraiser, and Vittoria Boni, a member of a noble family in Urbino. Five years later, the family relocated to the city of Mondaino where her father hoped for better opportunities. At the age of nine, she was sent for her education to a local monastery of Poor Clare nuns. She developed there a strong love of Christ, which she associated with a desire for seclusion and poverty.

Early in her life Renzi felt called to become a nun. At the age of 21, she was admitted to a monastery of Augustinian nuns in Pietrarubbia, in the Marche, located at a high elevation and therefore noted for its isolation and poverty. There she experienced great happiness, however in 1810 she and the other nuns were expelled from their monastery under the occupation of the Italian peninsula by the Napoleonic Kingdom of Italy, which suppressed all monasteries. She then returned to her family home.

Seeking new direction in her life, Renzi sought guidance from her spiritual director, through whom she was led to the village of Coriano, where she arrived on 29 April 1824 and took charge of a school established to educate poor girls and young women of the region.

Renzi initially sought to place the school under the administration of the Canossian Sisters to provide it greater stability. However their foundress, Magdalene of Canossa, after visiting the school and getting to know both her and the situation, advised her to take charge herself. Renzi then drew a group of women seeking deeper spiritual lives who were also drawn to the education of the poor. In 1828 she organized them into an unofficial religious community, which she called the Poor Women of the Crucified, for whom she wrote a Rule of Life. Soon other schools were established by the community in surrounding towns of the region.

Renzi sought formal recognition of the community by Ottavio Zollio, the Bishop of Rimini, who named her Superior of the community. Full recognition finally came in August 1839, when the subsequent bishop, Francesco Gentilini, established the women as a religious congregation of diocesan right and presided at the ceremony wherein Renzi and ten companions took the religious habit and professed their vows. At that time, the bishop gave the community their current name and placed them under the Rule of the Filippini Sisters based in Rome.

== Veneration ==
Renzi was beatified on 18 June 1989 by Pope John Paul II.

In 1846 her niece Giuseppina Renzi - a boarding student at the time - visited and became a member of her aunt's congregation.

In 1859 she was diagnosed with severe tuberculosis due to increasing stomach pains and a sore throat. Renzi died of tuberculosis on 14 August 1859 after receiving the Eucharist for the final time. When she heard the church bells she said: "I ask pardon of everyone for all my faults and omissions. Pray for me! Goodbye, beloved daughters; be generous with the Lord. I carry you all in my heart and bless you". At 8:00am she appeared to be dozing off but opened her eyes and whispered her final words: "I see ... I see ... I see ...". Pope Leo XIII approved the order in a papal decree of 25 March 1902 and approved its Constitution on the following 14 December. The order later was added as a branch of the Servite Order in 1934.

== Beatification ==
The beatification process commenced in 1965 - under Pope Paul VI - and had been tasked with the collation of all available evidence in relation to her life and her deeds in life. The process - which granted her the posthumous title of Servant of God - closed in 1968 and received formal ratification to show it completed its work according to the criteria.

The postulation compiled the Positio - a biographical account and attesting to the pros of her cause - and submitted it to the Congregation for the Causes of Saints. But a historical commission had to approve it and deem there were no obstacles to the cause in order for it to proceed to the next stage. The commission approved it in 1986 and allowed it to continue on to the next levels.

Renzi was proclaimed to be Venerable - on 8 February 1988 - after Pope John Paul II acknowledged the fact that she had lived a model Christian life of heroic virtue - both the cardinal and theological virtues.

The miracle needed for her beatification was investigated in the place of its origin and received ratification on 10 October 1986. The pope approved it in 1989 and beatified Renzi on 18 June 1989.

The current postulator assigned to the cause is Giovanni Zubiani.
