= Adeline Yen Mah =

Chinese author and physician (born 1937)

- Mǎ Yán Jūnlíng
- Born: Yen Jun-ling; 30 November 1937 (age 88); Tianjin, China
- Education: St Joseph's Primary School, Tianjin (1941-1943); Sheng Xin Primary School, Shanghai (1943-1948); St Joseph's Primary School, Tianjin (1948-1949); Sacred Heart Canossian College, Hong Kong (1949-1952)
- Alma mater: London Hospital Medical College
- Occupations: Author, physician
- Known for: Writing
- Notable work: Falling Leaves, Chinese Cinderella
- Title: Dr. Adeline Yen Mah
- Spouses: Byron Bai-lun Soon (m. 1964–1970) Robert A. Mah (m. 1972)
- Children: 2
- Parent(s): Joseph Tse-Rung Yen (1907-1988); Ren Yong-Ping (1906-1937?)
- Website: adelineyenmah.com

Adeline Yen Mah (simplified Chinese: 马严君玲; traditional Chinese: 馬嚴君玲; pinyin: Mǎ Yán Jūnlíng) (馬嚴君玲) (legal birthday 30 November 1937) is a Chinese-American author and physician. She grew up in Tianjin, Shanghai and Hong Kong, and is known for her autobiography Falling Leaves.

== Life ==
Yen Mah had an older sister called Lydia (Jun-pei) and three older brothers, Gregory (Zi-jie), Edgar (Zi-lin), and James (Zi-jun). She has stated in Falling Leaves that she did not use the real names of her siblings and their spouses to protect their identities but she did use the real names of her father, stepmother, aunt and husband, while referring to her paternal grandparents only by the Chinese terms 'Ye Ye' and 'Nai Nai'.

Yen Mah also writes of her grandfather's younger sister (Yan Shuhe), whom she calls 'Grand Aunt'. She cites Yan Shuhe as founder and president of the Shanghai Women's Commercial and Savings Bank. Shuhe's colleagues would often call her 'Gong Gong', meaning Grand Uncle.

=== Early life ===
The story of Yen Mah's life from 1937 to 1952 is recorded in her autobiography, Chinese Cinderella.

Adeline Yen Mah was born in Tianjin, Republic of China on 30 November 1937 to 30-year-old Joseph Yen (Yen Tsi-Rung), a businessman, and Ren Yong-ping, an accountant.

Yen Mah's legal birthday is 30 November, as her father did not record her date of birth and instead he gave her his own (a common practice prior to the establishment of the People's Republic of China in 1949). Two weeks after Yen Mah's birth, her mother died of puerperal fever and according to traditional Chinese beliefs, Yen Mah was called 'bad luck' by the rest of her family and because of this, was treated harshly throughout her childhood.

When Yen Mah was one year old in 1938, Joseph Yen married a half-French, half-Chinese (Eurasian) 17-year-old girl named Jeanne Virginie Prosperi (1920-1990). The children referred to her as Niang (娘 niáng, another Chinese term for mother), and she is called so throughout Chinese Cinderella. They had two children, Franklin and Susan (Jun-qing).

Yen Mah started attending kindergarten in 1941, aged 4. In her first week, she received a medal for topping her class.

In 1942, Yen Mah's father (Joseph) and stepmother (Jeanne) moved from Tianjin to Shanghai to a house along Avenue Joffre.

On 2 July 1943, Yen Mah's grandmother, died of a stroke.

==== Shanghai ====
Six weeks after the death of Nai Nai (Yen Mah's grandmother), in August 1943, Yen Mah and her full siblings joined them at the house afterward.

Two months after Yen Mah arrived in Shanghai, her grandfather, her Aunt Baba, her brother James, Franklin and Susan arrived (they delayed moving to observe the hundred days' mourning period for Nai Nai). When Susan arrived, she was too young and too close to Aunt Baba to recognise and approach her mother, Niang, who thus beat her loudly in frustration and anger. Yen Mah intervened, leading Niang to declare that she would never forgive her.

In September 1948, Yen Mah's father and stepmother brought Yen Mah back to Tianjin, where she reattended her first school.

==== Hong Kong ====
The Yen family later moved to Hong Kong when Yen Mah was eleven, and she transferred to Sacred Heart School and Orphanage (Sacred Heart Canossian College). However, in July 1951, aged 13, Yen Mah developed pneumonia. Her father visited her for the first time in many years.

Yen Mah's grandfather, Ye Ye, died on 27 March 1952 due to complications with diabetes.

At the age of fourteen, as her autobiography states, Yen Mah won a playwriting competition for her work Gone With the Locusts, and her father allowed her to study in England with James.

=== University ===
Yen Mah left for the United Kingdom in August 1952, and studied medicine at the London Hospital Medical College, eventually graduating with an M.B.B.S. in 1960. Later, she obtained an M.R.C.P. from the Royal College of Physicians in 1962. Before the start of her career in the United States, she had a brief relationship with a man named Karl, and practised medicine in a Hong Kong hospital at the behest of her father, who refused to give her air fare when she expressed plans to move to America. She has stated in an interview with the South China Morning Post that her father wanted her to become an obstetrician in the belief that women wanted treatment only from a female doctor, but as she hated obstetrics she became an anaesthesiologist instead. Initially, Yen Mah pursued a career in medicine, including establishing a medical practice in California. However, after the success of her autobiography, Falling Leaves, she transitioned to writing full-time. She recalls that during her childhood, reading was her only escape. The characters in her book and the stories told to her by her teachers and friends inspired her to write her own novels.

=== Later life ===
On 13 May 1988, Yen Mah's father died. According to her autobiography Chinese Cinderella, her stepmother died on 9 September 1990. Her stepmother, Prosperi, refused to let Yen Mah and her biological siblings read her will until her own death. When the wills were read, Yen Mah had mysteriously been disinherited by Prosperi.

Yen Mah is married to Robert Mah, a professor of microbiology at UCLA. They have a daughter, Ann, who is the author of five books, including the novel The Lost Vintage. Yen Mah also has a son from a previous marriage.

== Literary career ==
Yen Mah's autobiography, Falling Leaves, was published in 1997, shortly after Jung Chang's memoir Wild Swans. It made the New York Times Bestseller list, selling over a million copies worldwide and translated into 22 languages.The success of Falling Leaves prompted Yen Mah to quit medicine and devote her time to writing.

Falling Leaves was translated into Chinese for the Taiwan market. It was titled Luoyeguigen (T: 落葉歸根, S: 落叶归根, P: Luòyèguīgēn). Unlike other cases of memoirs, the novel was translated by the original writer.

Her second work, Chinese Cinderella, was an abridged version of her autobiography (until she leaves for England aged 14), and has sold over one million copies worldwide. It received numerous awards, including The Children's Literature Council of Southern California in 2000 for Compelling Autobiography; and the Lamplighter's Award from National Christian School Association for Contribution to Exceptional Children's Literature in June 2002.

Published in 2001, her third book, Watching the Tree, is about Chinese philosophy and traditional beliefs (including Traditional Chinese Medicine). A Thousand Pieces of Gold was published in 2002, and looks at events under the Qin and Han dynasties through Chinese proverbs and their origins in Sima Qian's history, Shiji.

=== Children's literature ===
Yen Mah has written three further books for children and young adults. Chinese Cinderella and the Secret Dragon Society, her first fiction work, is based on events in World War II, and Along the River, another fictional book based on Chinese history. China, Land of Dragons and Emperors is a non-fiction history book for young adults.

In 2004, Yen Mah was voted fourth on the New Zealand children's best seller lists.

== Falling Leaves Foundation ==
Adeline Yen Mah is a Founder and President of the Falling Leaves Foundation, whose mission is "to understand the understanding between East and West" and provides funds for the study of Chinese history, language, and culture. There is also an award dedicated to teaching Australia over the Internet for free, and the foundation has established a poetry prize at UCLA. In 2013, she created an iPad game, PinYinPal, for learning Mandarin. In 2021, the Falling Leaves Foundation donated $30 million toward the construction of a medical research facility at the University of California, Irvine.

== Bibliography ==
- Falling Leaves Return to their Roots (1997)
- Chinese Cinderella: The Secret Story of an Unwanted Daughter (1999)
- Watching the Tree: A Chinese Daughter Reflects on Happiness, Traditions, and Spiritual Wisdom (2000)
- A Thousand Pieces of Gold: A Memoir of China's Past through its Proverbs (2002)
- Chinese Cinderella and the Secret Dragon Society (2003)
- China, Land of Dragons and Emperors (2008)
- Along the River: A Chinese Cinderella Novel (2009); also published as Chinese Cinderella: The Mystery of the Song Dynasty Painting
