= Antonio Provolo =

Venerable Antonio Provolo

Priest
- Born: 17 February 1801; Verona, Cisalpine Republic
- Died: 4 November 1842 (aged 41); Verona, Kingdom of Lombardy–Venetia
- Venerated in: Roman Catholic Church
- Attributes: Priest's attire
- Patronage: Institute for the Deaf; Society of Mary for the Education of the Deaf-Mute; Sisters of the Society of Mary for the Education of the Deaf-Mute

Antonio Provolo (17 February 1801 – 4 November 1842) was an Italian Roman Catholic priest best known for his work with deaf-mute children in Verona. He was the founder of the Institute for the Deaf as well as two religious orders dedicated to the care of deaf-mute children. Provolo was a noted musician and singer and put these skills to tremendous use during his life while also resorting to his own form of miming and sign language to better interact and educate with deaf and mute children to whom he dedicated his work. His school's work suffered after his death since those who followed him did not possess his charisma nor his miming skills, though the work of his orders spread across the globe. His school is now mired in sexual abuse allegations which continue at present.

Provolo's cause for sainthood commenced in 1960 under Pope John XXIII and he became titled as a Servant of God; confirmation of his heroic virtue allowed for Pope Francis to name him as Venerable on February 27, 2017.

== Life ==
Antonio Provolo was born in Verona in 1801 to the poor landowners Stefano Provolo and Antonia Allegri. His father died in 1816.

He studied under the Carmelites and soon began his studies at the Saint Sebastian school. He might have even wanted to have become a Carmelite friar had it not been for the Napoleonic suppression of religious orders. It was around this time that he first met Father Giovanni Frisoni who became his spiritual director and advised Provolo to begin his ecclesial studies.

Provolo collaborated with Saint Giovanni Antonio Farina since both men were dedicated towards the field of education. Provolo was ordained to the priesthood on 18 December 1824 and celebrated his first Mass sometime that same month. He taught seminarians after his ordination (he taught grammar) in Verona but would enter active parish service as a pastor sometime in 1825. He opened a school for the deaf – the Institute for the Deaf – on 30 October 1830 and founded two religious orders in 1840 and 1842 (an all-female order) dedicated to his work of working alongside deaf-mute children. Saint Maddalena di Canossa aided him in setting up his school and he collaborated with her from 1825 to 1830.

He was a gifted musician and singer and people described his voice as being "divine". His music teachers were disappointed that he did not choose singing as a career since his teachers believed he had remarkable potential for a remarkable career. As a novice, he directed a choir. Provolo studied under Father Sicard in Paris for nine months and began to teach deaf-mute children using French mime gestures and soon developed his own oral methods.

Provolo died on 4 November 1842 in Verona due to a dangerous edema; his remains since 1930 have been in the church of Santa Maria del Pianto. His institute suffered after his death because his successors lacked his charisma and his unique linguistic and miming abilities, though his institute did spread to other parts of the world. His institute is at present mired in several sexual abuse allegations.

== Beatification process ==
The cause for beatification commenced in 1960 under Pope John XXIII and Provolo became titled as a Servant of God; the informative process was launched in Verona to collect documentation and these were sent to the Congregation for Rites for further investigation. But the cause remained inactive until 6 June 1997 when the Congregation for the Causes of Saints validated this informative phase in Rome. The postulation submitted the Positio to the C.C.S. in 2000 with historians approving the cause not long after on 30 May 2000. Theologians approved the cause on 21 May 2010 as did the C.C.S. later on 2 February 2017.

Provolo was named as Venerable on 27 February 2017 after Pope Francis confirmed that the late priest lived a life of heroic virtue.

The process for a miracle opened in the diocese of its origin on 16 May 2007 and concluded sometime later prior to the C.C.S. validating this process on 30 January 2009.

The current postulator for this cause is the Piarist priest Mateusz Pindelski.

== See also ==
- Antonio Provolo Institute for the Deaf
