= Via et veritas et vita =

Words spoken by Jesus of Nazareth according to the Christian Gospel of John

The motto as it appears on the arms of the city of Arad, Romania

Via et veritas et vita (Classical Latin: [ˈwɪ.a ɛt ˈweːrɪtaːs ɛt ˈwiːta], Ecclesiastical Latin: [ˈvi.a et ˈveritas et ˈvita]) is a Latin phrase meaning "the way and the truth and the life". The words are taken from Vulgate version of John 14 (John 14:6), and were spoken by Jesus in reference to himself.

These words, and sometimes the asyndetic variant via veritas vita, have been used as the motto of various educational institutions and governments.

== New Testament ==
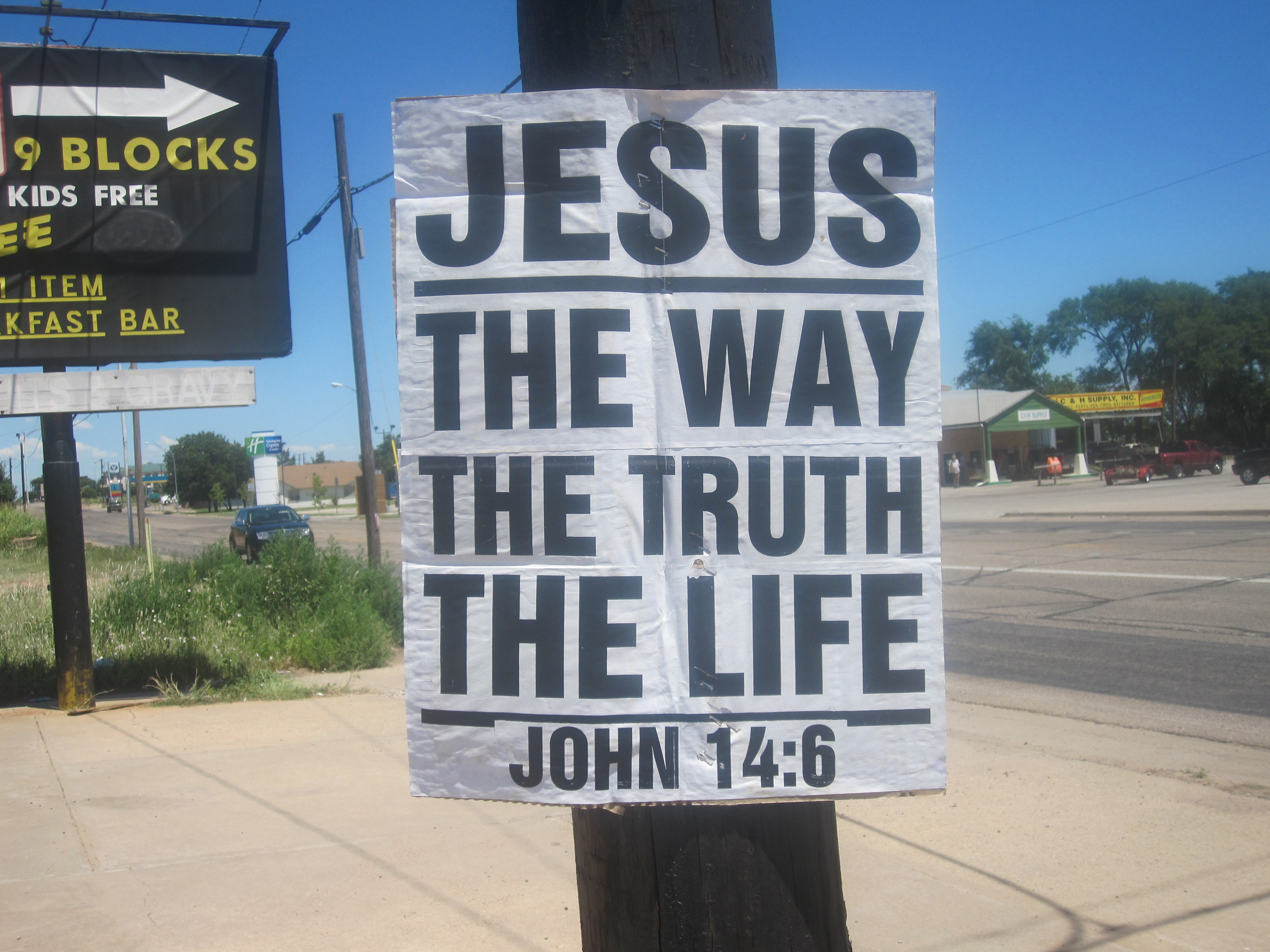
John 14:6 sign along U.S. Route 66 in Shamrock in Wheeler County, Texas

The phrase is found in verse 6 of chapter 14 of the Gospel of John, as part of Jesus' Farewell Discourse during the Last Supper:

"^{5} Thomas said to him, 'Lord, we do not know where you are going. How can we know the way?' ^{6} Jesus said to him, I am the way, and the truth, and the life. No one comes to the Father except through me. ^{7} If you know me, you will know my Father also. From now on you do know him and have seen him.'"(New Revised Standard Version)

In the original Koine Greek, the phrase is ἡ ὁδὸς καὶ ἡ ἀλήθεια καὶ ἡ ζωή; hē hodos kai hē alētheia kai hē zōē.

In the Latin Vulgate, verse 6 states: "dicit ei Iesus ego sum via et veritas et vita nemo venit ad Patrem nisi per me".

The phrase "The Way" is also found in Acts 9:2 and 19:23 as a term to describe the early church.

== Christian theology ==
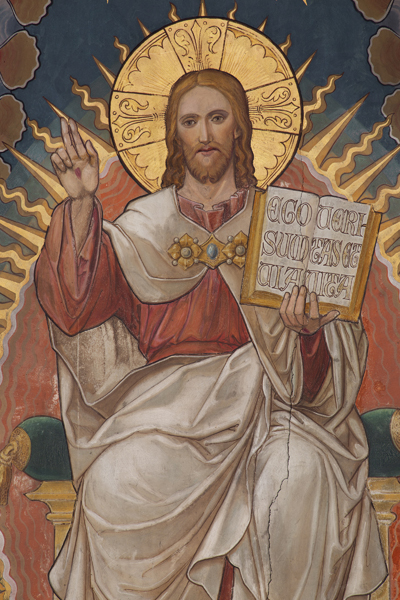
Painting in Deux-Acren, Belgium

This concept is foundational to Christian theology and the primary mechanism by which the metaphysics of Christianity establish a separation between theological principles of the earlier Judaism and other Abrahamic religions, in addition to Pauline directives not to practice the mitzvot and an establishment of Jesus Christ as divine.

It appears in John 14:6, written in the late first century, and would, centuries later, become relevant with the debates about the divinity of the Christian messiah and the split that was occurring in the earliest churches between orthodoxy and Arianism.

The statement has also been interpreted in relation to the distinction between Jesus as a historical human being and Christ as the divine Son in Christian theology. Within Johannine theology, the speaker is Jesus, but his words are presented within a Christological framework in which the Son possesses a unique relationship with the Father and shares in the divine identity. This interpretation does not, however, imply that Christ or the Holy Spirit is ontologically superior to God the Father: in Trinitarianism, the Father, Son and Holy Spirit are distinct persons but one God, equal in divine nature. The statement therefore concerns the Son's unique mediating and revelatory role in relation to the Father rather than a hierarchy of divinity among the persons of the Trinity.

It asserts that Christ himself and acceptance of his completed work on the cross and subsequent resurrection is the only path or method by which one receives forgiveness of sins, consistent with the Christian belief in original sin, and therefore eternal life of the soul following the death of the corporal body. The more liberal interpretations see this verse as an exultation and not a mandatory commandment, believing that any human being will receive eternal reward provided they live an ethical life and treat others according to the principles of the golden rule. Some interpretations call for a personal development and growth toward Christ, meaning, toward greater unity and communion with other human beings, while the more orthodox denominations interpret the verse more faithfully to the text as a direct commandment wherein Christ himself is the only true path to salvation.

== Usage as a motto ==
=== Government ===
- Arad, the capital of Arad County, Romania.
- The variation Veritas, Via, Vitae, appears on the seal of the Province of Negros Oriental, the Philippines.

=== Educational institutions ===
==== Higher education ====
- Glasgow University in Glasgow, Scotland, founded 1451
- Saint Xavier University in Chicago, Illinois, United States, founded 1846
- St. Benedict's College in Atchsion, Kansas, United States, founded 1858
- Wycliffe Hall, Oxford, Anglican theological college, permanent private hall of University of Oxford, founded 1877
- Kings University College at The University of Western Ontario in London, Ontario, Canada, founded 1878
- Eastern Nazarene College in Quincy, Massachusetts, founded 1900
- Japan Women's University in Tokyo, Japan, founded 1901
- Silliman University in Dumaguete, Philippines, founded 1901
- Providence University College and Theological Seminary in Otterburne, Manitoba, Canada, founded 1925
- Tamil Nadu Theological Seminary in Madurai, India, founded 1969
- Regis College in Weston, Massachusetts, founded 1927

==== Secondary education ====
- Our Lady of Mercy School for Young Women in Brighton, Monroe County, New York, founded 1928
- Bishop Garcia Diego High School in Santa Barbara, California, founded 1959
- St. Thomas High School in Pointe-Claire, Quebec, Canada, founded 1960
- St. Francis Xavier College in Beaconsfield, Berwick, Officer, Victoria, Australia, founded 1978
- St. Philip's Christian College in Waratah, New South Wales, Australia, founded 1982
- John Paul College in Coffs Harbour, New South Wales, Australia, founded 1983
- Boston Trinity Academy in Hyde Park, Massachusetts, founded 2002
- Christ the King College in Newport, Isle of Wight, England, founded 2008
- St John Fisher Catholic College in Newcastle-under-Lyme, Staffordshire

It is also the motto of some Canossian schools:

- Sacred Heart Canossian College in Hong Kong
- Sacred Heart Canossian College of Commerce in Hong Kong
- Sacred Heart Canossian Kindergarten in Hong Kong
- Sacred Heart Canossian School in Hong Kong
- Sacred Heart Canossian School Private Section in Hong Kong
- Saint Anthony's Canossian Secondary School in Bedok, Singapore

==== Primary education ====
- Saint Anthony's Canossian Primary School in Bedok, Singapore
- Canossa Convent Primary School in Singapore, Singapore
- Sacred Heart Canossian Convent in Malacca, Malaysia

== See also ==
This is also inscribed above the entrance to the Saint Stephen Basilica in Budapest, Hungary.

- List of mottos
- List of university mottos
- Related Bible parts: John 14
- Jesus maze, in Sussex, England, planted in the form of this quotation
