= Sacred Heart Canossian College =

Secondary school in Hong Kong

Coordinates: 22.25733°N 114.13821°E

S H C C
- 嘉諾撒聖心書院
- Motto: Via, Veritas, Vita "The Way, The Truth and The Life"
- Type: Grant School
- Established: 1860
- Founder: Magdalena of Canossa
- Affiliations: Canossians
- Religious affiliation: Roman Catholic
- Principal: Miss Renie Sinn
- Location: No. 2 Chi Fu Close, Pokfulam, Hong Kong
- Language: English
- Colors: Red, White
- Website: shcc.edu.hk

Sacred Heart Canossian College
- Traditional Chinese: 嘉諾撒聖心書院
- Simplified Chinese: 嘉诺撒圣心书院
- Literal meaning: Canossian Sacred Heart College
Transcriptions
Standard Mandarin
- Hanyu Pinyin: Jiānuòsā Shèngxīn Shūyuàn
Yue: Cantonese
- Jyutping: gaa1 nok6 saat3 sing3 sam1 syu1 jyun6*2

Sacred Heart Canossian College (Chinese: 嘉諾撒聖心書院; abbr: 'SHCC') is a Catholic, all-girls' school established at Robinson and Caine Roads, Mid-Levels, Hong Kong. Founded in 1860, the school currently serves under 2,000 students and has been identified as one of the most prestigious schools in Hong Kong.

== History ==
Sacred Heart Canossian College was founded by the Canossian Sisters of Charity soon after they first arrived in 1860; the order's founder, Magdalena of Canossa was subsequently canonised. It was one of Hong Kong first girls' schools established during the British colonial period.

Originally called 'Italian Convent School,' the school housed around 40 students. The medium of instruction was in English, Italian, with Chinese introduced later as 98% of the local populace at the time was Han Chinese. A sister college, Sacred Heart Canossian College was also established at around the same time in the neighbouring Portuguese colony of Macau, and there the language of instruction was predominantly Portuguese.

The first headmistress of the school was Sister Emily Aloysia Bowring, daughter of the fourth Governor of Hong Kong, Sir John Bowring. She served from 1860 to 1870.

In 1960, the school was renamed 'Sacred Heart Canossian College' (SHCC), to differentiate from other schools in Hong Kong. Originally, the school only educated girls at least six years of age. The school has a primary as well as a secondary sections.

At that time, SHCC occupied a stretch of land spanning from Robinson Road to Caine Road at Mid-Levels, an affluent area in Hong Kong. Many of its students were from wealthy and powerful families and it was a school of choice for parents who worked with the Hong Kong Government.

In 1981 the secondary section of the school moved to Pokfulam but the primary section remained at Robinson Road, Mid-Levels, Hong Kong. The primary section moved to a temporary accommodation until returning into Caine Road in 1992. The primary school has subsequently changed its name to Sacred Heart Canossian School Private Section.

SHCC is regarded as one of the prestigious schools in Hong Kong. Over the years, it has a number of graduates that have grown to prominence including former Chief Secretary for Administration Anson Chan; former Attorney General Elsie Leung; and Selena Tsang, the wife of former Chief Executive Donald Tsang.

== Campus ==
The original campus was located in Caine Road, Mid-Levels, Hong Kong. In 1981, the secondary section moved to its present location in Pokfulam, Hong Kong. The campus occupies an area of 6400 square metres on a verdant hillside, overlooking East Lamma Island, an outlying island adjacent to Hong Kong Island.

The campus consists of three blocks of buildings and playgrounds. The school has 38 classrooms, 7 sciences laboratories, one multi-media learning centre, 2 visual arts rooms, a Teachers' Learning & Resources Centre, a Students' Learning & Research Centre, 3 computer rooms, 9 special rooms, 2 counselling rooms, a Student Council office, a health care room, history corner, school hall, library with the German corner, car park, tuck shop, chapel.

In 2006, the school campus is expanded with the construction of the St. Magdalene Block. The St. Magdalene Block has a video conference Room, the self-access learning centre (SALC), the computer assisted learning centre, the campus TV Studio, the staff common room, the school publications room and the religious room. The self-access learning centre is located on 3/F of the St. Magdalene Block, which is for students to learn through audio books, DVDs and have group discussions.

== Administration ==
SHCC is partially funded by the Government as a Grant-in-Aid School. Under the School Management Initiative, the school is managed by a School Management Committee, which consists of members of the Institute of Canossian Sisters of Charity Inc., the Principal, a teacher representative, a representative from the Alumni Association, and parents' representatives. This committee is ultimately responsible for all school policies.

== Curriculum ==
The secondary school had a total of 38 classes: 6 classes at each level from Form 1 to 5; plus two arts-stream classes and two science-stream classes in Forms 6 and 7. There are an average of 42 students per class in Forms One to Three, and approximately 35–40 students per class in Forms 4 and 5.

In Forms 1 to 3, students are approximately divided into two main groups according to their academic performance in mathematics and language proficiency. Students are then assigned to different classes towards science related or arts related curriculum.

Students are offered a variety of subjects in the secondary curriculum and in particular from Form 4 Form 7 to promote lifelong learning.

It was noted that, in general like many of the prestigious schools in Hong Kong, there is a general deteriotion of standards post 1997, when Hong Kong returned to the People's Republic of China.

However, there was a new curriculum started from 1 September 2010. The secondary school has a total of 36 classes: 6 classes at each level from Secondary1 to 6.

In Secondary 1 to 2, students have to take 14 classes, and for secondary 3 students, they have to take 18 classes. In Secondary 4 to 6, students have to take 4 core subjects (English, Chinese, Mathematics and Liberal Studies) and 3 other subjects as elective subjects in the New Senior Secondary (NSS) 334 Scheme curriculum.

== Academic performance ==
Religious education remained the core subject to be learned alongside mainstream subjects throughout the school curriculum. To encourage a well-rounded development of its students. In most cases, students took nine subjects at the HKCEE level.

Most SHCC's graduates continue their studies at the university level in Hong Kong.

Due to the generosity of various local organisations and past students, a great number of scholarships are offered to students with a chance of good academic performance. Clubs such as Debating Society, Science Society, Chinese Culture Society, Maths Club, Economics Society provide the opportunity to students to put their academic knowledge into practice.

== Subjects ==
- Form 1 to Form 3:

Chinese Languages, English Languages, Mathematics, Religious and Moral Education, Chinese History, Integrated Science (Form 1 to 2), Physics, Chemistry, Biology (Form 3), Geography, History, Putonghua, Computer, Music, Physical Education (include P.E and Dance in Form 1 and Form 2, Swimming for Form 3), Home Economics (include cooking and sewing), Visual Arts, Drama (for Form 1 and Form 2), Life & Society

- S1 to S2 (starting from 1 September):

English Language, Chinese Language, Mathematics, Religious and Moral Education, Music, Physical Education, Visual Arts, Chinese History, History, Life & Society, Home Economics, Geography, Visual Arts, Computer, Science

- S3 to 6:

English Language, Chinese Language, Mathematics, Liberal Studies.

For HKCEE

- Form 4 to Form 5:

Chinese Languages, English Languages, Mathematics, Religious and moral education, Chinese History, English Literature, Geography, History, Economics, Additional Mathematics, Biology, Chemistry, Physics, Accounting, Computer, Home Economics, Visual Arts, Music, Physical Education

For HKALE

- Form 6 to Form 7:

Chinese Languages and Literature, English Languages and Literature, Mathematics, Religious and moral education, Psychology, Geography, History, Economics, Biology, Chemistry, Physics, Music, Physical Education

For HKDSE

- S4 to S6:

4 Core Courses; Chinese Languages, English Languages, Mathematics and Liberal Studies. Other required courses; Physical Education, Music (S4), Visual Arts (S4) and Religious and Moral Education. 3 Elective Courses; Chinese History, Chinese Literature, English Literature, Geography, History, Economics, Mathematics Extension Module 1 (Calculus and Statistics), Mathematics Extension Module 2 (Algebra and Calculus), Biology, Chemistry, Physics, Business Accounting and Financial Studies, Information and Communication Technology, Ethics and Religious Studies

== Houses ==
The six houses are named after six well-known, successful women in the history. Students are randomly assigned into different houses during admission and are allocated permanently.

| House | Named after | Colour |
|---|---|---|
| House of Bronte | Charlotte Brontë | Red |
| House of Curie | Maria Skłodowska-Curie | Yellow |
| House of Keller | Helen Adams Keller | Purple |
| House of Nightingale | Florence Nightingale | Navy Blue |
| House of Pankhurst | Emmeline Pankhurst | Jujube red |
| House of Teresa | Mother Teresa | Sky blue |

== Student organizations ==
- Student Council (SC)
- Alumnae Association (AA)
- Parents & Teacher Association (PTA)
- Discipline Prefect
- Library Prefect
- Counselling Team
- I.T. Prefect
- Moral & Civic Education Team
- Sex Education Team
- Careers and Further Studies Team (CFST)
- School Stage Management Team
- Campus TV
- Music Society
- Sport Society
- Head Girl Core Group
- Visual Arts Team
- Chess and Games Society
- History Society

== Notable alumni ==
=== Politics and civil service ===
- Anson Chan (陳方安生) – Former Chief Secretary for Administration of Hong Kong and former Legislator Councillor. Former Associate Governor of Hong Kong
- Elsie Leung (梁愛詩) – Former Secretary for Justice (Attorney General) of Hong Kong. Member of the Executive Committee of the People's Republic of China.
- Tanya Chan Suk chong (陳淑莊) – Legislative Councillor (Geographical constituency, Hong Kong Island), member of Central and Western District Council of Hong Kong (Peak Constituency), founding member of the Civic Party of Hong Kong (one of the two major political parties in Hong Kong).

=== Commerce ===
- Margaret Leung (梁高美懿) – Former Vice-chairman, chief executive officer of Hang Seng Bank Ltd. and the Group general manager and Global Co-head of Commercial banking of HSBC.
- Prudence Chan Bik-wah (陳碧鏵) – Former Chief Executive Octopus Cards Limited, Former general manager of Television Broadcasts Limited (International)

=== Arts and entertainment ===
- Alice Mak (麥家碧) – Artist and cartoonist. She is the author of the two most popular cartoon characters in Hong Kong; McMug (麥嘜) and Mcdull (麥兜).
- Winifred Lai (黎堅惠) – Designer, journalist and blogger. Winifred Lai's Blog
- Amy Kwok Oi Ming (郭藹明) – Actress, 1991 Miss Hong Kong winner
- Chillie Poon (潘芝莉) – Actress, 1996 Miss Hong Kong first runner-up
- Elsie Chan (陳奕詩) – Actress, 1986 Miss Asia Pageant
- Kitty Yuen (阮小儀) – DJ
- Adeline Yen Mah – Author of Falling Leaves and her bestseller Chinese Cinderella

=== Sports ===
- Stephanie Au Hoi-Shun (歐鎧淳) – Athlete, two-time swimmer, winner of the 24th Hong Kong Outstanding Students Awards
- Janet Yu Wai Ting (于蕙婷) – Athlete, swimmer from Hong Kong, part of Hong Kong's bronze medal-winning 400 Free Relay

== Associated schools and hospitals ==
The order Canossian Sisters of Charity (嘉諾撒仁愛修會) has founded hospitals and a number of schools in the South East Asia, particularly in Hong Kong and Macau. The following is an inexclusive list:

- St. Francis' Canossian College (嘉諾撒聖方濟各書院)
- St. Mary's Canossian College (嘉諾撒聖瑪利書院)
- Holy Family Canossian College (嘉諾撒聖家書院)
- Pui Tak Canossian College (嘉諾撒培德書院)
- Sacred Heart Canossian School Private Section (嘉諾撒聖心學校私立部)
- Sacred Heart Canossian College of Commerce (嘉諾撒聖心商學書院)
- Sacred Heart Canossian College, Macau (嘉諾撒聖心女子中學)
- Canossa Hospital, Hong Kong
- Sacred Heart Canossian School(嘉諾撒聖心學校)
