= St. Francis' Canossian College =

Secondary school in Wan Chai, Hong Kong

Coordinates: 22.2748°N 114.1691°E

St. Francis' Canossian College 嘉諾撒聖方濟各書院

Location
- 9 -13 Kennedy Road; Wan Chai; Hong Kong

Information
- Type: Aided (Grant School)
- Motto: Veritas in Charitate (Live by the Truth in Love 力行仁愛 實踐真理)
- Religious affiliation: Roman Catholic
- Established: 7 May 1869; 157 years ago
- School district: Wan Chai District
- Principal: Mr. Kenneth LAW
- Grades: Form 1–6
- Gender: Girls
- Colors: Blue, White
- Feeder schools: St. Francis’ Canossian School
- Affiliation: Canossian Daughters of Charity
- Information: +852 2527 1007
- Medium of instruction: English
- Website: http://www.sfcc.edu.hk/

St. Francis' Canossian College
- Traditional Chinese: 嘉諾撒聖方濟各書院
- Simplified Chinese: 嘉诺撒圣方济各书院
Transcriptions
Standard Mandarin
- Hanyu Pinyin: Jiānuòsāshèng Fāngjǐgè Shūyuàn
Yue: Cantonese
- Jyutping: gaa1 nok6 saat3 sing3 fong1 zai3 gok3 syu1 jyun2

St. Francis' Canossian College (abbr: SFCC; Chinese: 嘉諾撒聖方濟各書院; Jyutping: gaa1 nok6 saat3 sing3 fong1 zai3 gok3 syu1 jyun2; demonym: Franciscan) is a girls' secondary school located in Wan Chai, Hong Kong. It was founded on 7 May 1869 as the second school established by the Italian Canossian Daughters of Charity in Hong Kong. The wall painting of four Guardian Angels playing instruments is the school's mascot.

St. Francis' is one of the very few aided English secondary schools that comprise an aided comprehensive feeder primary school, which is known as St. Francis' Canossian School. The primary section is located on St. Francis Street and underneath the Kennedy Road campus. Well known for its long list of distinguished alumni, the school has been identified as one of the most prestigious Catholic girls' schools in Hong Kong.

== School history ==
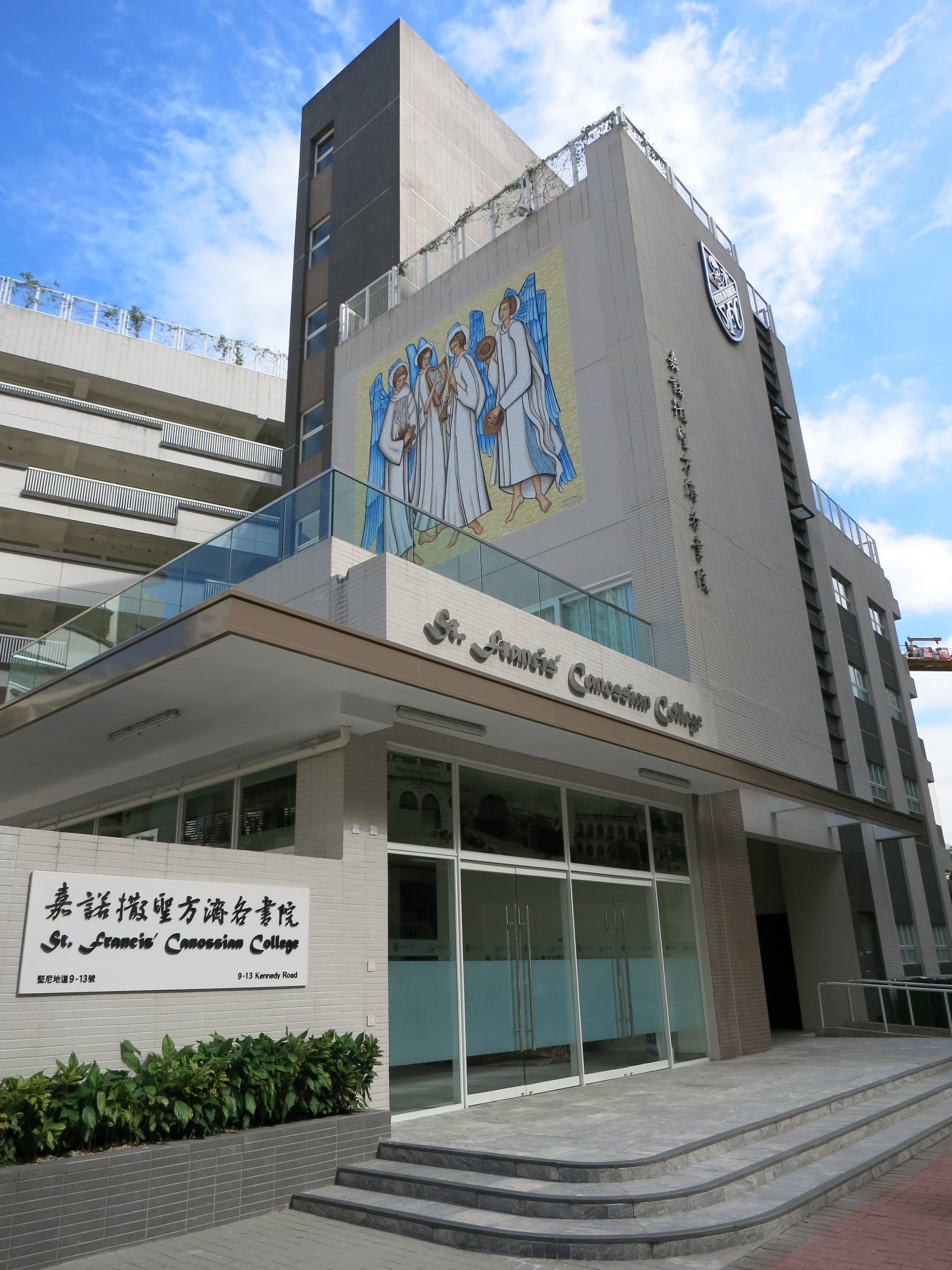
St. Francis' Canossian College

The Origin – A House at Wan Chai's Slum

In 1860, a small group of Canossian Sisters left their native Italy and moved to Hong Kong for evangelism. In order to teach and care for the moral welfare of the many poor children who lived in Wan Chai, in 1869, Canossian Sisters took a house to provide proper education with an emphasis on moral growth and self-respect to the poor and needy, which was the beginning of today's St. Francis' Canossian College. The Sisters did not only start a school, they also set up a hospital and an orphanage at the same address. After visiting the school, the Governor of Hong Kong was very impressed with the school's education, so he invited the school to join the "Grant-in-aid" Scheme. Although the school became a government establishment and one of the earliest Grant Schools in Hong Kong, the administration and management still belonged to Canossian Daughters of Charity.

The Development in Post-War Era

The school closed in 1941 due to the Japanese Occupation, but the determination and passion of the Sisters did not waver. After the World War II ended in 1945, the school re-opened and was named "Sacred Heart Junior School" until 1953 when it was renamed as "St. Francis' Canossian College." As a result of increasing demand of school places, the school started an expansion project with two extensions completed in 1956 and 1958. In the meantime, the school established the first team of Red Cross Youth Unit in 1956, which became one of the most sizable uniform groups in Hong Kong. To further fulfill educational needs, the school introduced Form Six classes in 1962 and since then provided quality education from Primary One to Form Six. The hall building also opened in 1985, which consisted of a gymnasium, a library, a needlework room, a cookery room etc.

The Millennium Campus

Eventually, only the school campus for both secondary section and primary section remained standing on Kennedy Road while the other buildings on St. Francis Street were used as the convent for Canossian Sisters and Caritas Magdalene School. Caritas Magdalene School was redeveloped into the new campus for the primary section in 2007 and the expansion project for the primary section finished in 2010. St. Francis' redevelopment construction for secondary section has started in 2011 and finished in 2018. The total site area of primary and secondary section is around 9,517m^{2}, which takes up the hillside from St. Francis Street to Kennedy Road.

=== Timeline ===
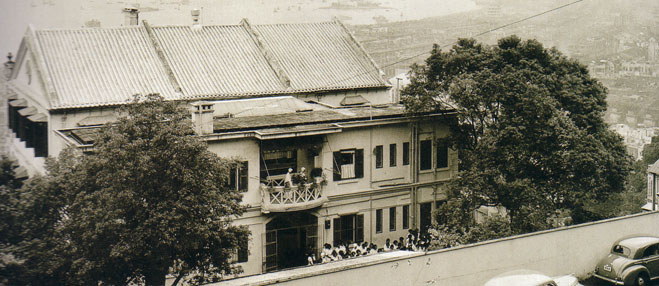
School building, 1869

School building, 1870

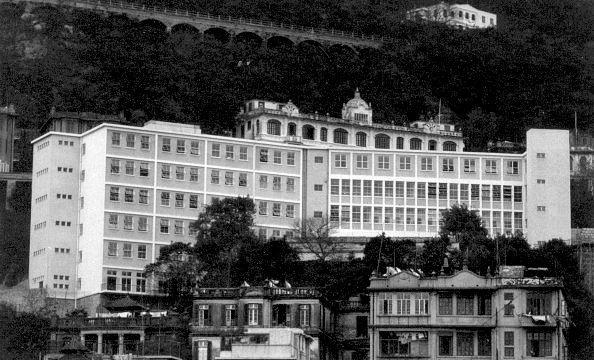
School building, 1958

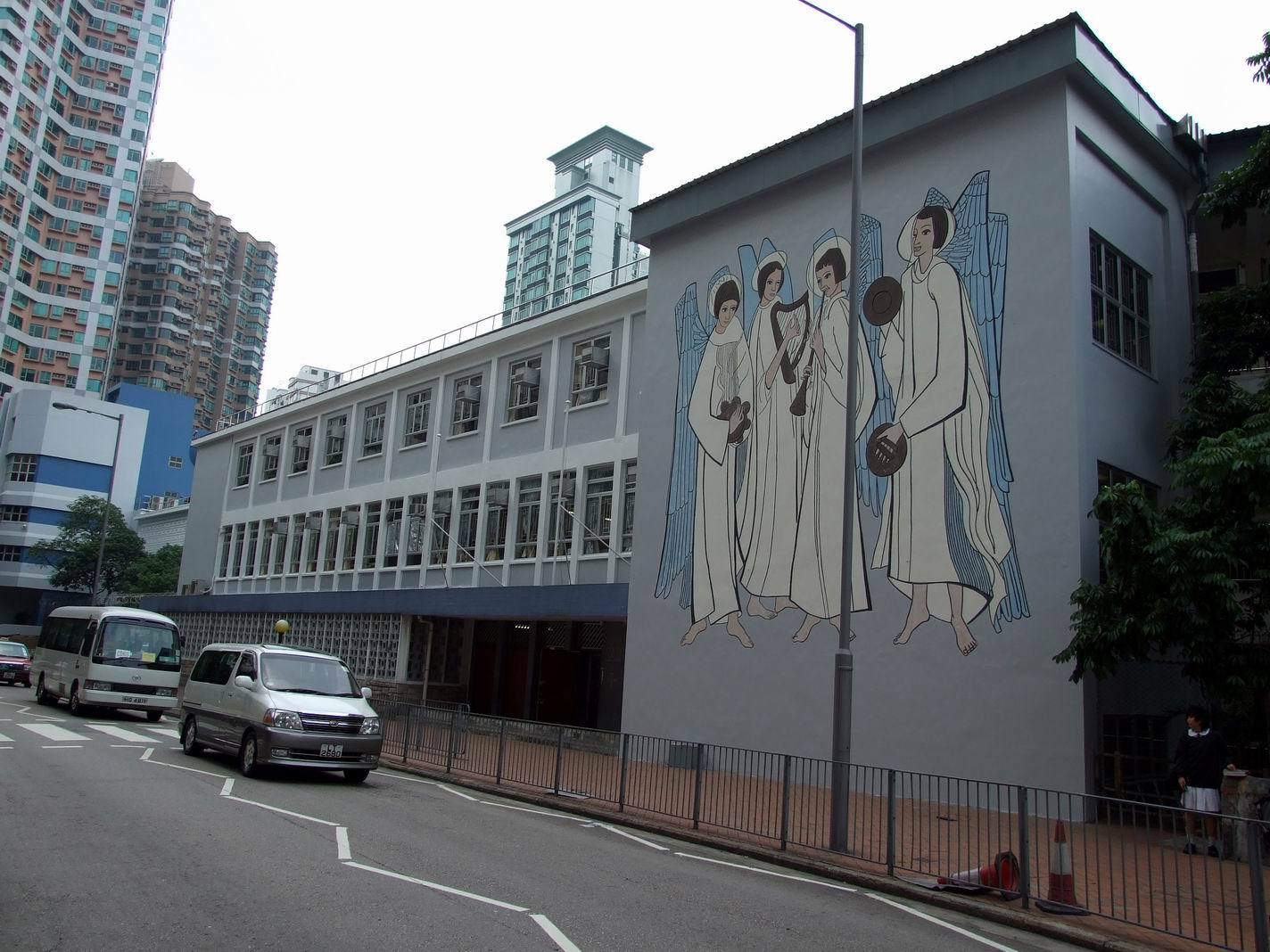
School building, 1985–2011

==== 19th century ====
- 1869 – School was founded on 7 May. In response to Catholic Diocese's request, Canossian Daughters of Charity started a school around the St. Francis Yard area and took charge of the first Catholic hospital in Hong Kong, St. Francis' Hospital, which was once abandoned by Catholic Diocese.
- 1870 – A piece of land was granted by the government to build the campus, where included a hospital, an orphanage and a school taught in Chinese, English and Portuguese.
- 1876 – First graduation of Primary Six students.
- 1881 – School joined the "Grant-in-aid" scheme. Among the existing Grant Schools, St. Francis' was the first girls' school in the program.

==== 20th century ====
- 1920–1940 – The school consisted of a kindergarten, a primary school and a junior secondary school with a total of over 500 students. The secondary section was known as "St. Francis' School", which was a girls' English school. The co-educational primary section was named as "Holy Infant School" and divided into Chinese and English sections. Although the majority of students were girls, boys under 10 years old were accepted. After graduation, boys will be promoted to other boys' secondary schools, such as St. Joseph College and Wah Yan College, Hong Kong.
- 1945 – School reopened after World War II and was named as "Sacred Heart Junior School."
- 1952 – Visit of Governor Sir Alexander Grantham.
- 1953 – School was renamed as "St. Francis' Canossian College."
- 1956 – The East Wing (Phrase I Building for the Primary Section) was completed. The first team of Red Cross Youth Unit (Youth Unit One) in Hong Kong was formed on 5 November.
- 1958 – Second phrase of the school building (Administration Block) was completed. First graduation of Form Five graduates.
- 1960 – The Past Students' Association was established. Visit of Bishop Lorenzo Bianchi. With St. Francis' Hospital being moved to Old Peak Road, St. Francis' was further expanded.
- 1962 – First year of Sixth Form Classes.
- 1963 – The West Wing (Phrase III building for the Secondary Section) was completed. First batch of matriculants presented to University of Hong Kong.
- 1970 – Fund-raising activities for the Hall building were launched.
- 1975 – The Student Association was set up.
- 1985 – School Hall building was completed.
- 1986 – The Parent Teacher Association was set up.
- 1994 – School celebrated its 125th anniversary with the motto "The World needs our Care."
- 1998 – Conversion of the covered playground into a Multi-purpose unit.

==== 21st century ====
- 2000 – The campus was extensively damaged by landslide on 24 August. The school reopening was postponed to mid-September.
- 2002 – Project Learning curriculum was implemented in junior classes.
- 2004 – School celebrated its 135th anniversary with the motto "Our Dream is still Alive."
- 2009 – School celebrated its 140th anniversary with the motto "Magdalene's Dream in Motion."
- 2010 – The new campus of the primary section was completed and the official move-in was in September.
- 2011 – Open Day for the new campus of the primary section. Michael Suen Ming-yeung was the honourable guest of the opening ceremony. The secondary section started seeking consultation for the redevelopment project in Wan Chai District. The owners of the nearby luxury homes once complained about the new campus design due to the fear of depreciation in property values.
- 2012 – First Swimming Gala. Fund-raising campaign for the redevelopment of the secondary section, "Bring Back Our Angels", was launched.
- 2013 – "Bring Back Our Angels" Fund-raising Variety Show was held at Lyric Theatre, Hong Kong Academy for Performing Arts. Carrie Lam Cheng Yuet-ngor delivered an opening speech as an officiating guest. Bowie Wu Fung performed as a special guest since his three daughters were alumni.

=== List of Principals ===
	Period	Name
1	1937–1945	Sister Angelica de Piazza, FdCC (In the early years the principal of SHCC also took charge of St. Francis'.)
2	1945–1947	Sister Lina Riva, FdCC
3	1947–1948	Sister Valentina Pattano, FdCC
4	1948–1953	Sister Giannina Gilardi, FdCC
5	1953–1958	Sister Carlotta Abati, FdCC
6	1958–1965	Sister Nedda Buratti, FdCC
7	1965–1967	Sister Laura Piazzesi, FdCC
8	1967–1971	Sister Emma Cazzaniga, FdCC
9	1971–1974	Sister Miriam Tavecchio, FdCC
10	1974–1979	Sister Marie Remedios, FdCC
11	1979–1991	Sister Bernadette Au Yee Ting, FdCC
12	1991–2015	Sister Susanna Yu Ka Pik, FdCC
13	2015–	Mr. Kenneth Law

== School information ==
=== Principal and supervisor ===
- Current Principal: Mr. Kenneth Law
- Current Supervisor: Sr. Veronica Fok
- Current Vice Principal: Ms. Rebecca Lee
- Current Assistant Principal: Ms. Irene Ho

=== School motto ===
Veritas in Charitate
(English: Live by the Truth in Love; Chinese: "力行仁愛 實踐真理")
This motto encourages all Franciscans to embrace Christian values through a life of integrity and charity, along with an emphasis upon spiritual growth, social awareness, compassion and a clear sense of justice.

=== Admission ===
Form One students mostly come from the feeder primary school. Around eighty percent of the Primary Six graduates are accepted into the secondary section. Other students are admitted through Secondary School Places Allocation (SSPA) System. The majority of admitted students belong to Band One, the top one-third of all students in Hong Kong.

=== Class structure ===
There are 24 classes in total with 4 classes at each level, from Form One to Form Six (A, B, C, D).

=== Curriculum ===
English is the medium of instruction for all subjects except for Chinese Language, Chinese History and Putonghua. Junior forms follow the territory secondary school curriculum and senior forms follow the HKDSE curriculum.

=== School Campus ===
All classrooms, special rooms and School Hall are air-conditioned and provided with Internet access. Each classroom is equipped with a computer, a visualiser and an interactive whiteboard. Special rooms include the STEAM Room, Computer Room, Art Room, Music Room, Independent Learning Center, Library, Laboratories and Needlework Room, all equipped with computing facilities.

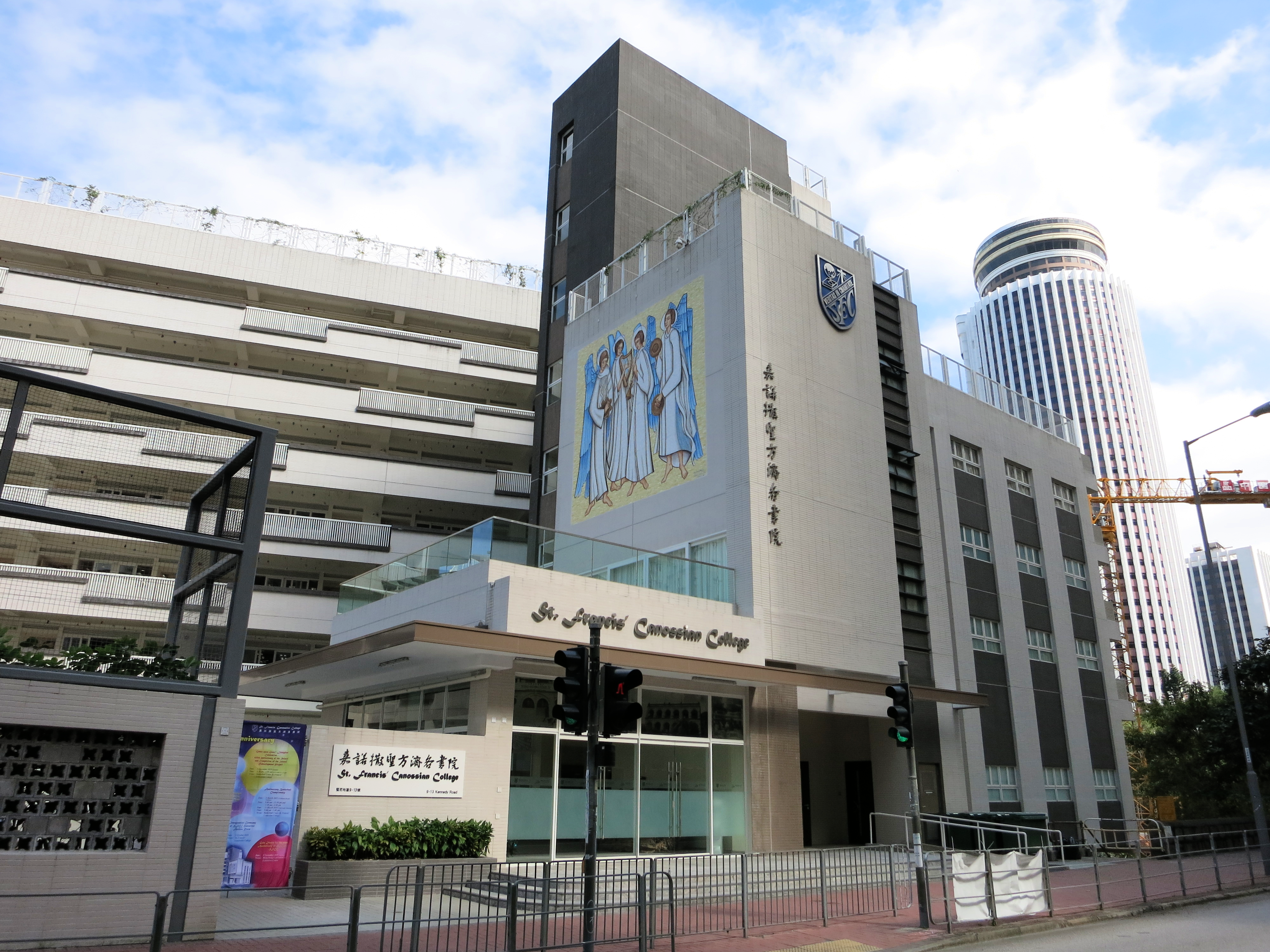
Main Entrance

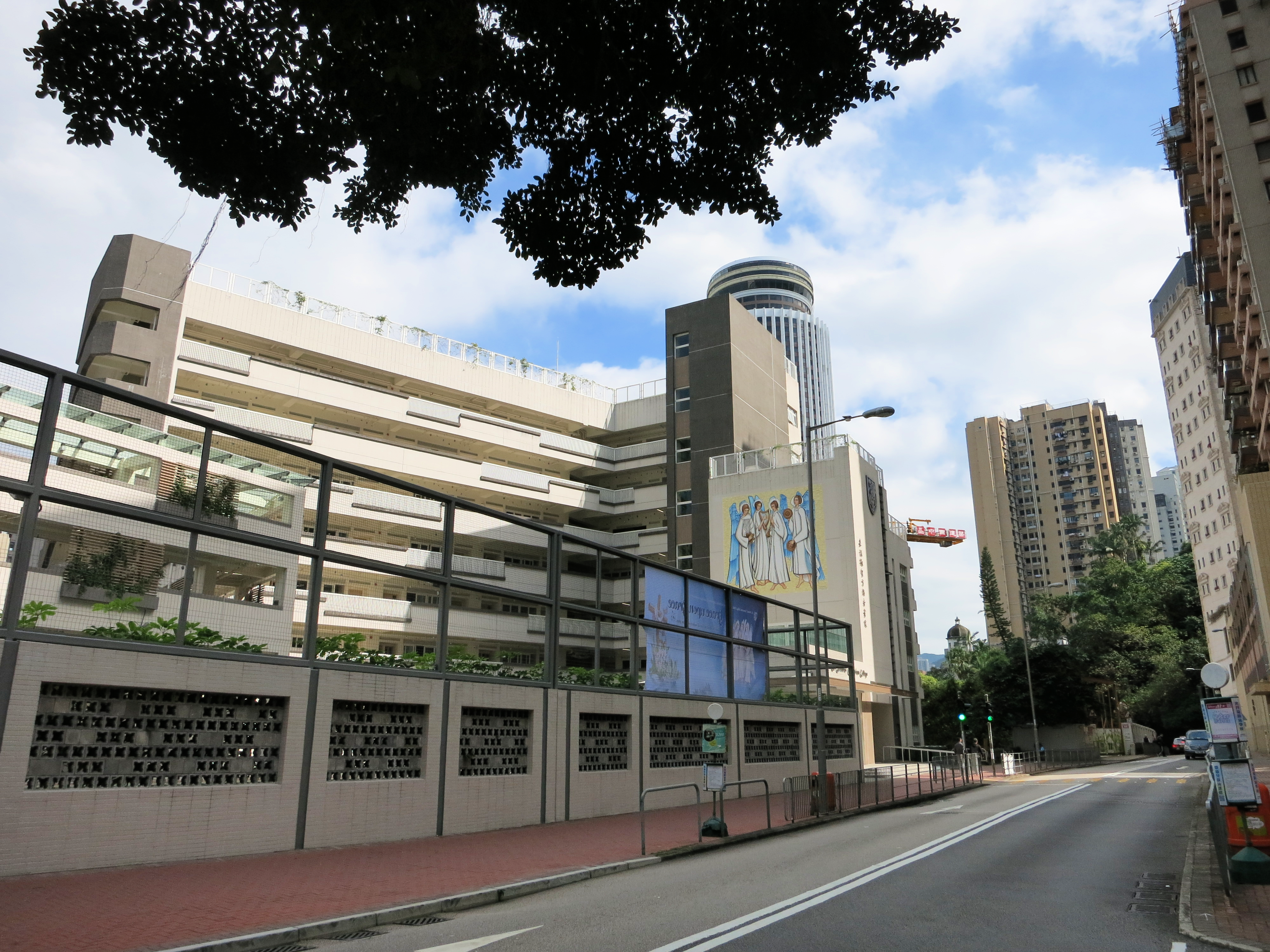
Classroom & Administration Block

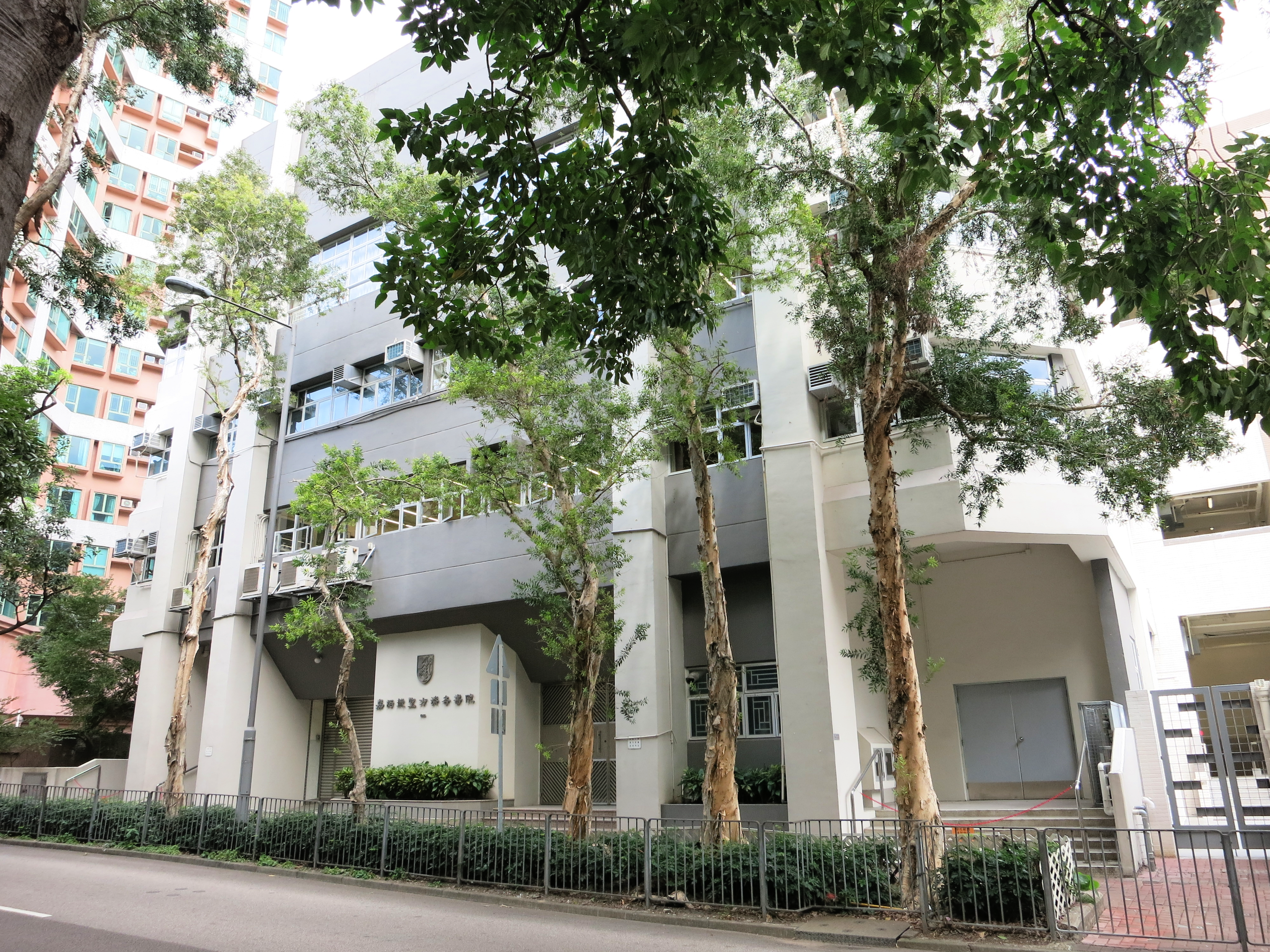
Assembly Hall Block

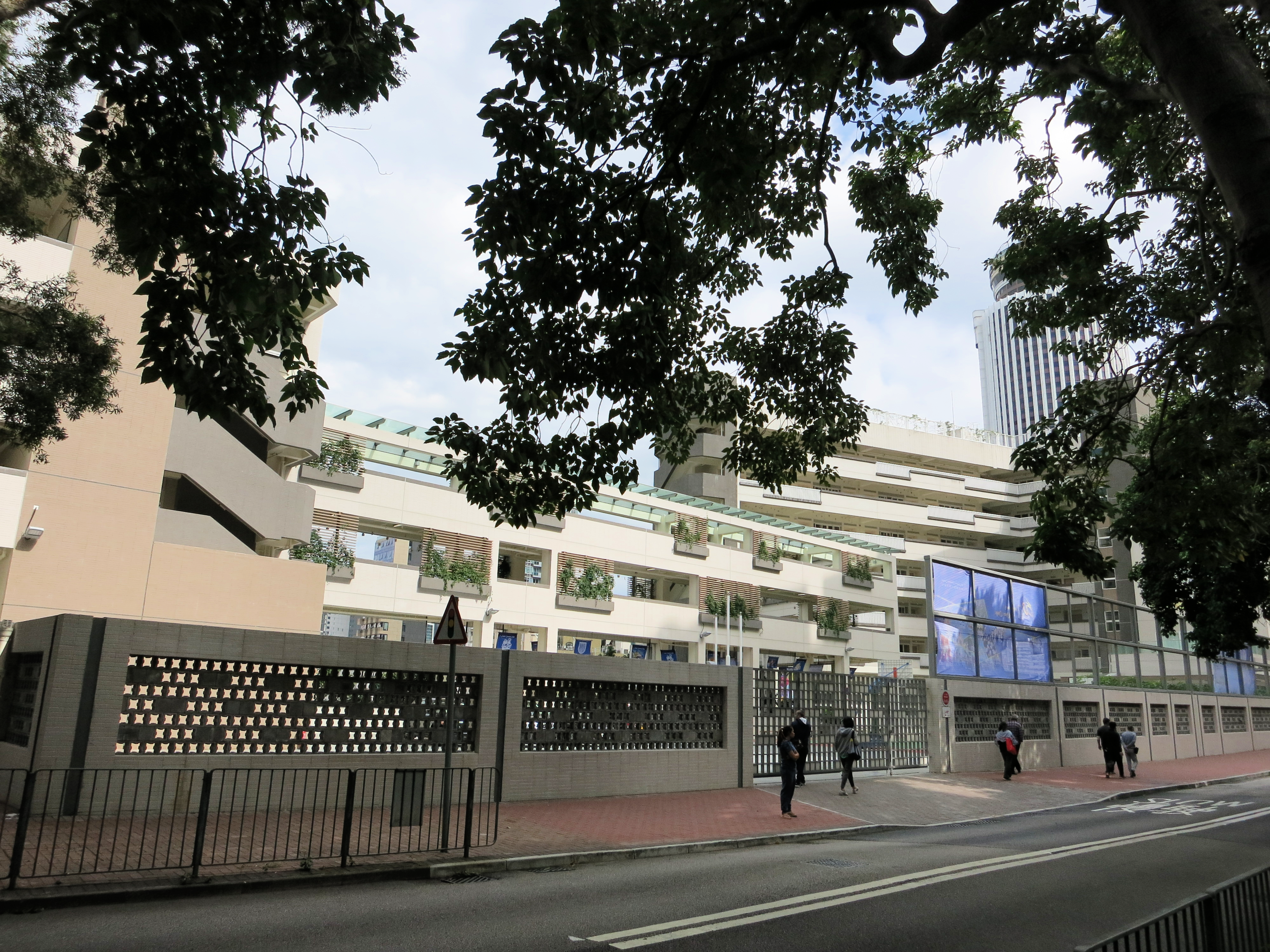
Car Park & Link Bridge

== School uniform ==
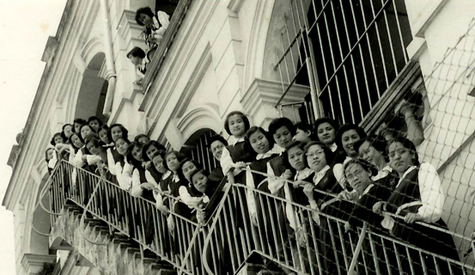
School Uniform before the 1950s

The school uniform of St. Francis' has the same design as the two other sister schools', SHCC and SMCC, but differentiated by colors and school badges.

St. Francis' has a very strict policy on uniforms and grooming. Unannounced uniform inspection will be conducted throughout the school year.

=== Summer uniform ===
White short sleeve dress with turn-down collar and pleated bottom, blue waist belt, blue skinny tie, white short socks and black leather shoes. Navy blue or black or white cardigan or sweater of simple style is allowed when necessary. White slip is compulsory to even out the high transparency of the white uniform dress. No other garment can be used as a substitute.

=== Winter uniform ===
Navy blue jumper with pleated bottom, white long sleeve turn-down collar blouse, blue waist belt, blue skinny tie, navy blue short socks and black leather shoes. Navy blue or black cardigan or sweater of simple style is allowed when necessary.

=== School tie ===
The school tie of junior forms and senior forms are different. Form One to Form Four students wear azure ( ) plain skinny tie. Form Five to Form Six students wear cerulean ( ) school badge patterned skinny tie.

=== Sports uniform ===
Sports shirt corresponding to the color associated with the house and navy blue athletic pants.

=== Hair style ===
Hair longer than shoulder length must be neatly tied up with dark blue or black ornaments. Masculine hairstyle and use of gel, hair spray, mousse or hair-coloring are forbidden.

== Student activities ==
=== Student formation ===
- Career's Guidance Team
- Civic Education Team
- Counselling Team
- Discipline Team
- STEM Team
- Religious Team
- Sex and Health Education Team
- Student Association (SA)
- Student Librarian Union (SLU)

=== Extracurricular activities ===
The school has 4 houses, 20 clubs and interest groups, which are divided into 5 categories and managed by Student Association:

School Teams	Service and Uniform Groups	Interest Groups	Religious Groups	Academic Groups
Chinese/English Debating Team	Community Youth Club (CYC)	Art Club	Legion of Mary	Chinese Club
Junior/Senior Choir	Girl Guides Association (31st Island Company)	Debating Society	Catholic Society	Computer & Maths Union
Symphony Orchestra	Red Cross Association (Youth Unit 1)	Drama Club		English Society
Chinese Instrumental Ensemble	Social Service Group	Games Club		Science Union
Swimming Team		Music Association		Social Science Union
Basketball Team		Photography Club		
Athletics Team		Sports Union		
Dance Team				

=== Four houses ===
Each student or teacher is randomly assigned to a house upon joining the school. Four houses will be competing in different inter-house contests throughout the school year. The house with the highest scores will be awarded the title "House of the Year."

- St. Gabriel House (仁社)
  House Color: Red
- St. Nicolaus House (愛社)
  House Color: Blue
- St. Patrick House (忠社)
  House Color: Green
- St. Valentina House (信社)
  House Color: Yellow

=== Publications ===
- Bloom (School Newspaper)
- 蕾報 (Chinese version of Bloom)
- Yearbook

== Feeder primary school ==
St. Francis' Canossian School (abbr: SFCS; Chinese: 嘉諾撒聖方濟各學校) is a whole-day girls' school offering P1 – P6 classes. The medium of instruction is Chinese that all subjects are offered in Chinese except for English Language. As the school is an aided school, it is a comprehensive school that admits Primary One students through Education Bureau's Primary One Admission System in the territory. Before the school year 2008–2009, the school offered half-day schooling that P1, P3 and P5 were a p.m. class and P2, P4 and P6 were an a.m. class.
After sharing the campus with the secondary section since establishment, the school started moving to 44–46 St. Francis Street in 2008 and the construction finished in 2010. Now the school site is around 4,762m^{2} and located below the Kennedy Road campus.
Since Canossian Daughters of Charity started managing the current school site in 1869, the site had been used for different education services, including a school for blind children in 1959 and a school for deaf-mute children in 1974. Later the site was leased to Caritas Magdalene School for mentally handicapped children in 1987 until the lease agreement with Caritas ended in 2007.

School Badge

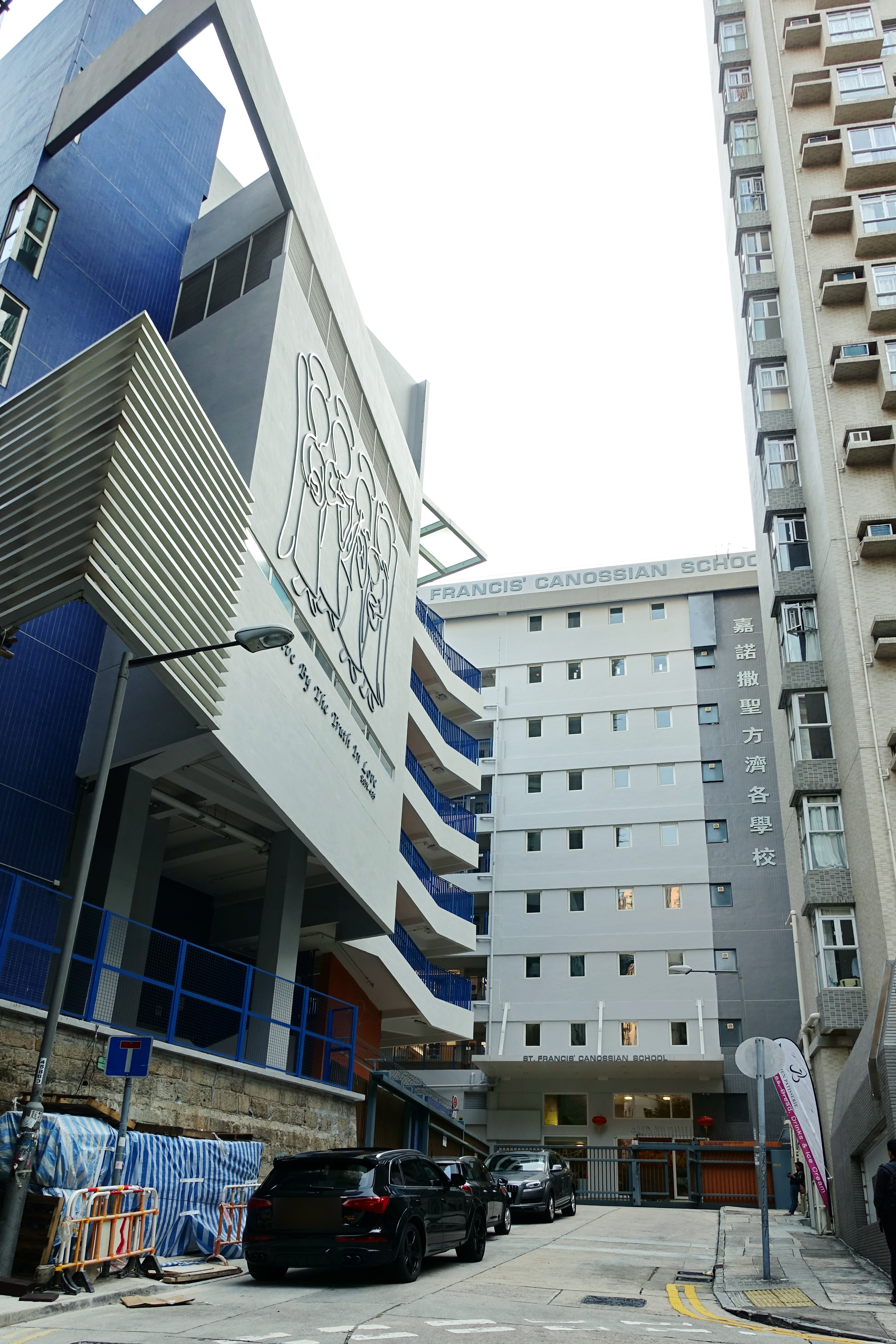
School Campus

== School song ==
Verse 1:

Do you hear our joyful voices
Ringing sweetly through the skies?
Day by day our heart rejoices
As our thanks to heaven rise.
For our school instructs and leads us
On the way to virtue and love.

Refrain:

Live St. Francis! Live forever
In our mind and in our heart!
Bless our teachers and companions
Be the bond when we depart!

Live St. Francis! Live forever
In our mind and in our heart!
Bless our teachers and companions
Be the bond when we depart!

Verse 2:

Here we pray, we work together
For the love of God and men;
Here we study, here we gather
Here we play and here we gain.
And when troubles seem to double
To our school for peace we turn.

(Refrain)

Verse 3:

As the years fly off together
We, too, march on life's hard main,
But St. Francis' will forever
Live in mind and heart again;
To encourage, to uplift us
Till we reach our home above.

(Refrain)

== List of notable alumnae in alphabetical order ==
=== Politics and business ===
- Anna Mak (麥周淑霞) – Former deputy director (services) of social welfare
- Anita Chan Lai-Ling (陳麗玲) – Spouse of Chan Shu Kui, former president of Bonds Group of Companies, former president of Chan's Educational Organisation Limited.
- Audrey Eu Yuet-mee (余若薇) – Barrister, former member of Legislative Council of Hong Kong and former (founding) leader of Civic Party.
- Carrie Lam Cheng Yuet-ngor (林鄭月娥) – Chief Executive of Hong Kong, former Chief Secretary for Administration of Hong Kong.
- Dana Lau Sing-she (劉聖雪) – Member of New People's Party (Hong Kong)
- Eunice Yung Hoi-yan (容海恩) – Barrister, member of Legislative Council and member of New People's Party (Hong Kong).
- Ingrid Yeung Ho Poi-yan (楊何蓓茵) – Permanent Secretary for Education of Hong Kong, former Commissioner for Transport of Hong Kong
- Janet Chu (朱蔡鳴鳳) – Former Assistant Head of Create Hong Kong
- Jenny Fung Ma Kit-han (馮馬潔嫻) – Chairman of Hong Kong Paralympic Committee & Sports Association for the Physically Disabled, spouse of former Secretary General of the Legislative Council, Ricky Fung Choi-cheung and managed public relations for Henry Tang's Hong Kong Chief Executive Election Campaign in 2012.
- Laura Cha Shih May-lung (查史美倫) – Non-official member of Executive Council of Hong Kong, Chairman of Financial Services Development Council, Hong Kong, Hong Kong deputy to the National People's Congress and Non-Executive Deputy Chairman of The Hongkong and Shanghai Banking Corporation.
- Lina Yan Hau-yee (殷巧兒) – Recipient of Medal of Honour, Chairman of The Family Planning Association of Hong Kong, Director of Concerted Efforts Resource Centre, Former Chairman of CUHK Convocation, former vice-chairman of Hong Kong Arts Development Council etc.
- Lorna Wong Lung-shi (黃浪詩) – Vice Chairman of Hong Kong Breast Cancer Foundation, Former Director of Hong Kong Economic and Trade Office, Sydney and former Director of Television and Entertainment Licensing Authority.
- Miranda Chiu Shung-kwok (趙崇幗) – Former Deputy Secretary for Economic Development and Labour Bureau of Hong Kong, former Deputy Chief Executive Officer of Equestrian Events (Hong Kong) of the Games of the XXIX Olympiad Company Limited, spouse of former Director of Lands, Patrick Lau Lai-chiu and campaign manager of Regina Ip's Hong Kong Chief Executive Election Campaign in 2017.
- Pauline Ng Tsui Fung-ying (吳徐鳳英) – Former Assistant Commissioner of Police, Personnel
- Rita Suen Chung Siu-fan (孫鐘小芬) – Spouse of former Secretary for Education, Michael Suen, and mathematics teacher at St. Francis' until 1990s (Carrie Lam, Ingrid Yeung, Miranda Chiu etc. were Suen's students).
- Viola Chan Man Yee-wai (陳文綺慧) – Ex-officio Member of Tung Wah College, Director of PuraPharm Group of Companies, Director of Natural Corporation Ltd, former Chairman of Tung Wah Group of Hospitals etc.

=== Education ===
- Emily Mok Fung Yee (莫鳳儀) – Council member of HKAPA, recipient of Medal of Honour, selected as The Ten Outstanding Young Persons, former Head of DBC Radio Campus etc.
- Ho Chi-Kwan (何芝君) – Professor of Caritas Institute of Higher Education, former associate professor of the HKPU Faculty of Applied Social Sciences, Founder of The Association for the Advancement of Feminism
- Kwan Sze Pui (關詩珮)－Associate Professor of Chinese and Translation Studies, Nanyang Technological University, Singapore
- Lilian Vrijmoed Kwan Lee-ping (關利平) – Former Dean of Student Learning of CityU and former professor of CityU Department of Biology
- Mamie Lau (劉美明) – Specialist in Biochemistry, Founder and Director of RadHealth
- Nancy Chan Woo Mei-hou (陳胡美好) – Former Principal of King's College, Hong Kong

=== Sports ===
- Valerie Ma Kwan-ching (馬君正) – Hong Kong Windsurfing Representative

=== Culture and performing arts ===
- Abbie Yip (葉文炘) – Former financial news anchor of Now TV Hong Kong
- Anny Chong (莊安宜) – Former chief news anchor of Cable TV Hong Kong
- Annie Wong (黃婉瑩) – Multimedia cookery instructor, hostess of the cookery section of 'Pleasure & Leisure' on TVB Jade and author of cooking books.
- Anita Fung (馮翠珊) – President of Alexander McQueen Asia and spouse of William So.
- Blanche Tang (鄧藹霖) – DJ of RTHK, media professional, author and columnist.
- Erica Li Man (李敏) – Writer, lyricist, screenwriter, singer and hostess.
- Flavia Wong (黃可盈) – Artiste
- Frank Ching (秦家聰) – Journalist, columnist and author. One of very few male students of St. Francis'.
- Gabriel Kwan (關懿婷) – Former news anchor of TVB Jade and ATV and Head of Corporate & Business Communications at Standard Chartered Bank.
- Jennifer Chan (JC) (陳泳彤) – Singer
- Lee Bo Ying (李寶瑩) – Cantonese opera maestro
- Rosa Lee (李家怡) – Singer-songwriter, contestant of The Voice (Hong Kong) and recipient of Hong Kong Outstanding Students Awards.
- Sze Mei-ling (斯美玲) – Former Chief Editor of Cantonese and Mandarin News at KTSF (San Francisco Bay Area).
- Toby Chan (陳庭欣) – Artiste, winner of Miss Hong Kong 2010. (only graduated from the primary section)
- Vincci Cheuk Wan-chi (卓韻芝) – Former DJ of Commercial Radio Hong Kong, creative professional, author, emcee etc.
- Virginia Maher – Journalist
- Winkie Lai (黎美言) – Singer, member of the cantopop trio group HotCha.
- Wong Ming-lok (黃明樂) – Author and former Campaign Manager of Alan Leong's Chief Executive election campaign in 2007.

== Sister schools in Hong Kong ==
- Sacred Heart Canossian College
- St. Mary's Canossian College
- Canossa College
- Holy Family Canossian College
- Pui Tak Canossian College
