= Chinese Cinderella: The Mystery of the Song Dynasty Painting =

2009 book by Adeline Yen Mah

- Author: Adeline Yen Mah
- Cover artist: Adeline Yen Mah
- Language: English
- Series: Chinese Cinderella Series
- Genre: Children's novel historical novel
- Published: 2009 Puffin Books
- Publication place: China
- Media type: Paperback
- Pages: 280
- Preceded by: Chinese Cinderella and the Secret Dragon Society

Chinese Cinderella: The Mystery of the Song Dynasty Painting is the seventh book made by the Chinese American author Adeline Yen Mah, also known for writing Chinese Cinderella and Falling Leaves both selling around one million copies. This 2009 novel is the sequel to a fictitious story of the Chinese Cinderella and the Secret Dragon Society.

== Summary ==
While going out to buy ingredients for lunch with David, Ye Xian/CC is pursued by a mysterious woman in black. Panicked and frightened that she will be discovered with her involvement in the World War II, CC climbs onto a slippery roof and suffers a nasty fall, whereupon she faints and David carries her to a clinic. Despite it being only a slight abrasion, CC frequently has headaches, lapses in and out of consciousness, haunted by vivid and familiar yet strange dreams and finds herself fascinated with a famous Chinese painting known as Along The River at Qing Ming. Grandma Wu arranges an appointment with the doctor to conduct hypnotherapy to try and cure her by getting it out of her system. Under hypnosis, CC becomes a different person and recounts a story from more than 800 years ago, during the Song dynasty.

Taking on the life of Zhang Mei Lan (张美兰), a daughter of a rich court official, she lives with her older brother Zhang Zeduan (张择端) (called "Gege", the Chinese term for "older brother"), father, and beautiful but icy-cold stepmother called "Niang" in Bian Liang (汴梁). Soon, her father hires a poor orphan boy named Ah Li to help out around the garden after noticing his jade-carving work, and Mei Lan and Gege form a friendship with him despite the difference in their social statuses. They soon find out that Ah Li has an incredible ability to capture the beauty of the natural world, and despite being illiterate, can write better than Gege in shufa (书法). Gege and Mei Lan inform their father of Ah Li's ability immediately. His big moment arrives when the Song emperor, Emperor Huizong (徽宗), orders Ah Li to carve a jade dog for his birthday due to him being born in the Year of the Dog. Impressed with his work, the emperor gifts Ah Li 5 ounces of silver, as well as the permission to use the royal surname "Zhao". From then on Ah Li will be called Ah Zhao.

Meanwhile, Niang is forcing Mei Lan to marry and bind her feet, which she only manages to do halfway for her right foot before Mei Lan flees. The children go to the Qingming Festival together on an errand, where Ah Zhao and Gege get inspiration for a painting capturing everything happening at once in a perfect, time-stopping moment. Ah Zhao's talent is also further demonstrated through a painting of a dragon rock for Mei Lan and Zeduan's father on his birthday, and Emperor Huizong decides to recruit Ah Zhao to be one of his artists-in-residence, or even a eunuch, where he can paint pictures for the Emperor all day long and be rewarded. In addition, the Emperor also takes ownership of the painting and names it Xiang Long Shi (祥龙石). Knowing that the Emperor will not take no for an answer, Ah Zhao decides to run away from home aided by the siblings. Before he goes, however, he promises Mei Lan that he will meet her by the bridge on the night of the Qingming Festival in three years' time.

Three years have passed. Gege is preparing to induct into the palace and become an official, but he is annoyed at being unable to paint and write nearly as well as Ah Zhao, whom he misses too but is secretly becoming jealous of. Mei Lan also notices other subtle changes in her brother: he is becoming more and more altered and obedient to the rules of Chinese society and not supporting her but rather Niang, unlike his former self. As the date of the Qingming Festival nears, Mei Lan decides to use that opportunity to run away from marriage and her family. Before the date of departure, Ah Zhao sends over two lacquered boxes for the siblings: the one for Gege contains the finished painting of Along The River at Qing Ming, while the second for Mei Lan contains an unfinished painting a poem relating their imperfections together, as well as a note telling her to "Be careful". Puzzled with this cryptic meaning, Mei Lan meets up with Ah Zhao as planned, but is thwarted on the way by Gege, who tells her to come home, saying that "it's our little secret", but she recognizes that her brother is no longer himself and jumps from the roof where she met Ah Zhao, slipping on the cobblestones in her attempt to escape.

The memories stop and Grandma Wu explains the tale to probably be experienced by CC during her past life. The main thing is that CC is now cured and free to return home.

== Critical reception ==
Publishers Weekly calls the book a "painstakeningly researched novel" that "brings to life the sights and sounds of ancient China" and provides "a clear interpretation of the era's rigid social structures". Jennifer Rothchild of Prince George's County Memorial Library System in a review for School Library Journal, on the other hand, describes the book's set-up as "promising", but states it "suffers from a clunky framework and stilted storytelling" in which "the story and characters are often lost in excessive historical detail and background".
