= Whitesmith maze =

Maze near Whitesmith, East Sussex, England

Coordinates: 50°54′22″N 0°10′43″E

A plantation of willows near Whitesmith, East Sussex, in England forms a maze in the shape of a quotation from the Bible. The maze was planted by local farmer Peter Gunner in the 1990s in the form of his favourite biblical passage. The maze was little noticed until spotted on Google Earth aerial photography in 2013, when it was reported in the media.

== Description ==
In the 1990s, Peter Gunner, a committed Christian, was inspired by his faith to plant a maze on his farm near Whitesmith, East Sussex. He selected a passage from his favourite verse from the Bible: the 14th chapter of the Gospel of John. In this verse, Jesus responds to Thomas the Apostle's question: "How can we know the way?" with "I am the way, the truth and the life". Gunner designed the maze on a computer, substituting the at sign (@) for the word "the" and prefacing the quote with Jesus' name. Gunner marked out the design in the field using a tape measure and string. He first mowed the design into the grass before planting, with the assistance of volunteers, thousands of willow trees. His first attempt failed, as it became overgrown with thistles, so he pulled up the trees and started afresh.

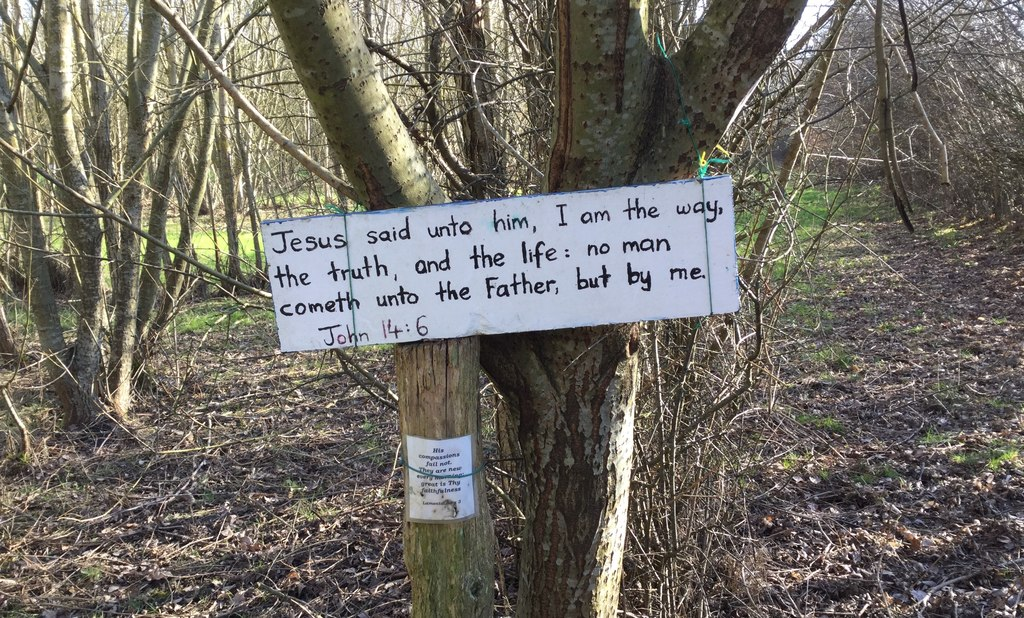
A sign in the maze

The Whitesmith maze is not a true maze, as people can walk freely between the individual letters of the quotations. Gunner also installed posts in the maze, carrying quotations from other biblical verses. He stated that he intended people to get lost in the maze as a metaphor, and has said that "the maze is a lot like life: no one knows what it looks like from above. You can wander through life confused, when in fact it makes sense from a different perspective". He opens the maze up regularly for his friends and fellow churchgoers. Gunner has also written the word "rejoice" on the top of his barn using coloured tiles.

Despite a public footpath running alongside the site of the maze, it initially attracted little attention. Gunner said that only one passer-by, an autistic girl, recognised that the trees formed letters. It was spotted by some microlight pilots and in 2005 Gunner was given a photograph of the maze taken from a helicopter by a neighbour who was a police officer. The maze attracted media attention in 2013 when it was spotted by users of Google Earth. In reviewing the aerial photography Gunner spotted that the letter "a" in "am" was slightly skewed, as was the top of the "J" in "Jesus". He said that "every time I see a plane go over I look at it and say a little prayer ... I hope that somebody sees it and feels inspired by it."
