= Sacred Heart Canossian School =

Coordinates: 22.2800°N 114.1534°E

- 嘉諾撒聖心學校
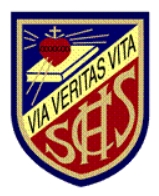

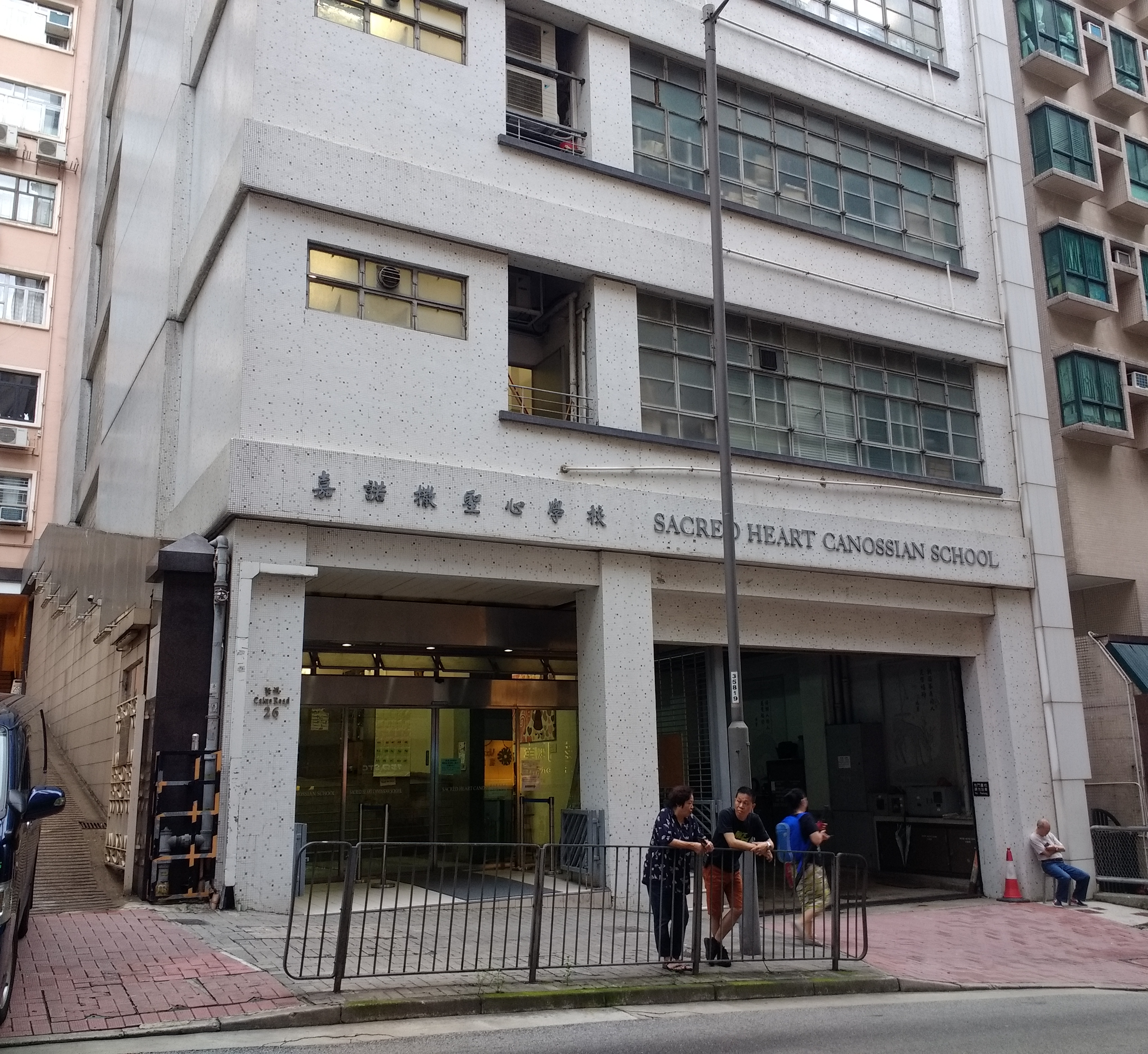
- Sacred Heart Canossian School, Caine Road, The Mid-Levels, Hong Kong
- Mid-Levels; Hong Kong

Information
- Type: Catholic convent school
- Motto: Via, Veritas, Vita (the Way, the Truth and the Life)
- Established: 1860; 166 years ago
- Website: shcs.edu.hk

Sacred Heart Canossian School
- Traditional Chinese: 嘉諾撒聖心學校
- Simplified Chinese: 嘉诺撒圣心学校
Transcriptions
Standard Mandarin
- Hanyu Pinyin: Jiānuòsā Shèngxīn Xuéxiào
Yue: Cantonese
- Jyutping: gaa1 nok6 saat3 sing3 sam1 hok6 haau6

Sacred Heart Canossian School (Chinese: 嘉諾撒聖心學校; abbr: "SHCS"; not to be confused with Sacred Heart Canossian School Private Section) is a Catholic girls' school established at Caine Road, Mid-Levels, Hong Kong. SHCS is partially funded by the Government as a Subsidised School. It has been considered one of the most prestigious primary schools in Hong Kong. Its affiliated secondary school Sacred Heart Canossian College is also highly reputed.

== History ==
SHCS was founded in 1860 by the Canossian Sisters of Charity. The founder of the order was Magdalene of Canossa who was subsequently canonised. It was one of the first primary schools for girls established during the British colonial period of Hong Kong.

The school moved from its previous premises at Robinson Road to its current campus at Caine Road in January 1992.

== School motto ==
The school motto is Via, Veritas, Vita, translated into the Way, the Truth and the Life . This is taken from verse 6 Chapter 14 of The Gospel According to John: "Jesus said: I am the Way; I am Truth and Life. No one can come to the Father except through me." This motto is common for Sacred Heart Canossian Kindergarten, SHCS, Sacred Heart Canossian School Private Section, Sacred Heart Canossian College, and Sacred Heart Canossian College of Commerce. Some students and alumnae of these schools call themselves “Sacred Heartists”.

== Classes and curriculum ==
There are a total of 30 classes in the school. The classes for Primary 1 to Primary 3 run as pm classes. Full-time classes are offered for Primary 4 to Primary 6 students.

== Official website ==
- Sacred Heart Canossian School 嘉諾撒聖心學校

== Affiliated bodies ==
- Parents' and Teachers' Association, Sacred Heart Canossian School 嘉諾撒聖心學校家長教師會
- Sacred Heart Canossian School Alumnae Association 嘉諾撒聖心學校校友會

== Related links ==
- Canossian Missions (HK & Macau Province) 嘉諾撒仁愛女修會 – 港澳省區
- Sacred Heart Canossian College 嘉諾撒聖心書院
- Sacred Heart Canossian College of Commerce 嘉諾撒聖心商學書院
- Sacred Heart Canossian Kindergarten 嘉諾撒聖心幼稚園
- Sacred Heart Canossian School Private Section 嘉諾撒聖心學校(私立部)
