= Chinese Cinderella =

Autobiographical novel by Adeline Yen Mah

Chinese Cinderella: The Secret Story of an Unwanted Daughter
- 1999 Puffin edition
- Author: Adeline Yen Mah
- Language: English, Chinese and Bengali
- Series: Falling Leaves
- Genre: Autobiographical novel
- Publisher: Delacorte Press
- Publication date: September 7, 1999
- Publication place: China
- Media type: Print (hardback, paperback)
- Pages: 224
- ISBN: 978-0385740074
- Preceded by: Falling Leaves
- Followed by: Chinese Cinderella and the Secret Dragon Society

Chinese Cinderella: The Secret Story of an Unwanted Daughter is a non-fiction book by Chinese-American physician and author Adeline Yen Mah describing her experiences growing up in China. First published in 1999, Chinese Cinderella is a revised version of part of her 1997 autobiography, Falling Leaves, presented as a narrative in the style of a non-fictional novel. Her mother died after giving birth to her (of blood loss) and she is known to her family as the worst luck ever. Her father remarries a woman who stays at home and looks after the children for a living while treating Adeline and her step-siblings harshly and spoiling her own children with many luxurious things. An extract of this book is also part of the anthology of Edexcel English Language IGCSE new specification.

The first novel in the Chinese Cinderella series, it was followed by The Secret Dragon Society (2004) and The Mystery of the Song Dynasty Painting (2009).

== Plot ==
Ever since Adeline was born, she had been rejected coldly because her family believed her to bring bad luck. Her father's first wife died two weeks after giving birth to her, the fifth child. Soon, her father remarries Jeanne Prosperi (referred to as "Niang" in most of the story, an old fashioned way for "mother" in Mandarin Chinese), a beautiful half-French woman. She regards his first five children, especially Adeline, with distaste and cruelty while favouring her younger son, Franklin, and daughter, Susan, both born soon after the marriage.

The book outlines Adeline's struggle to find a place where she feels she belongs. She did not get very much love from her parents, she finds some solace in relationships with her grandfather (Ye Ye) and her Aunt Baba, but they are taken from her as Niang deems them to exert a bad influence on the children. Adeline immerses herself in striving for academic achievement in the hope of winning her family's appreciation, but also for its own rewards as she finds great pleasure in words and scholarly success, progressing in things that her father and stepmother had never expected, for example by topping her class. She has many friends at school who love her for who she is, but they do not know about her inside life.

While at boarding school in Hong Kong, Adeline is taken away by her family's chauffeur and told that Ye Ye has died, leaving her broken-hearted but the rest of her family is indifferent. Her love for her grandfather is resonated when she reads King Lear, inspiring her to submit a work of writing for an international playwriting competition and study at an English university. However, Adeline worries over what might happen to her when she returns home and is conflicted between her decisions.

While Adeline is playing with her friends at boarding school, Adeline is interrupted and taken home by the family chauffeur to see her father. In his room ("The Holy of Holies"), she is informed that she has earned first place in the international playwriting competition. Delighted and surprised, Adeline gathers her courage to ask him for permission to study in England with her brothers in the field of literature and creative writing. Her father immediately rejects her idea, but decides to send her to a medical school in England that specialises in obstetrics. Nevertheless, Adeline is overjoyed to have the opportunity to study overseas, and agrees.
