= Leopoldina Naudet =

Italian religious sister and Blessed

Blessed Leopoldina Naudet
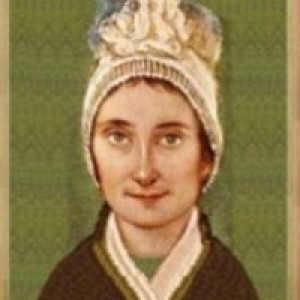
- Born: 31 May 1773; Florence, Grand Duchy of Tuscany
- Died: 17 August 1834 (aged 61); Verona, Kingdom of Lombardy–Venetia
- Venerated in: Roman Catholic Church
- Beatified: 29 April 2017, Basilica of Sant’Anastasia, Verona, Italy by Cardinal Angelo Amato
- Feast: 17 August

Leopoldina Naudet (31 May 1773 - 17 August 1834) was an Italian Roman Catholic of both French and Austrian origins. She was a religious sister of the Congregation of Dilette of Jesus and the foundress of the Sisters of the Holy Family of Verona. Naudet served in the court of Leopold II, Holy Roman Emperor and after his death served his daughter Maria Anna who became an abbess and professed religious alongside Naudet and her sister.

Naudet was noted for her strong devotion to the education of females and assigned her order to the moral and civic education of all girls in Verona where her order was based in. She focused on religious values in the curriculum that her order provided and also devoted herself to the precepts of her order that would receive papal approval months before her death.

She was proclaimed to be Venerable on 6 July 2007 after Pope Benedict XVI recognized that Naudet had lived a model life of heroic virtue. Pope Francis approved a miracle attributed to her intercession on 21 December 2016 and her beatification was celebrated on 29 April 2017 in Verona.

== Life ==
Leopoldina Naudet was born in Florence in 1773 as the eldest daughter of Giuseppe Naudet and Susanna von Arnth. Her father was French, and a senior official at the court of Leopold, Grand Duke of Tuscany. Her mother was the daughter of an Austrian officer.

Susanna Naudet died in 1778 and Leopoldina was entrusted to the Nuns of St. Frediano in Florence.In 1783, she went to Soissons to furthered her education with the Sisters of Notre Dame. Naudet returned to Florence in 1789, at the age of sixteen and became a teacher of Grand Duke Leopold's children. She became to close their daughter Archduchess Maria Anna.

In 1790, Leopold became Holy Roman Emperor. Naudet and her sister Luisa joined the Imperial Consort Maria Luisa when Leopold's court moved to Vienna. In 1791, Archduchess Maria Anna became Abbess of the Chapter of Nuns of St. George's Convent, Prague. Naudet held positions of trust in the institute known as the Beloved of Jesus to which she committed herself in collaboration with the Archduchess. She entered Maria Anna's direct service in 1792 following the death of the Emperor. While in Prague, Naudet had as her spiritual director Father Nicholas Diessbach. She also came into contact with Father Niccolò Paccanari and she favored the Congregation of Dilette of Jesus that he himself had established; the two also worked in the Beloved of Jesus. Naudet took with her Maria Anna and Luisa on 31 May 1799 to make their temporary consecration as professed religious; Naudet renewed it a week later as perpetual vows that bound her to the apostolic life.

In 1800 she travelled to Padua where she met with Pope Pius VII who encouraged her work in the field of education. She visited Padua, Loreto and Venice. In February 1801 she arrived in Rome where she was appointed superior of the Congregation of Dilette of Jesus but the order suffered a fatal split that saw French members establish the Congregation of the Ladies of the Sacred Heart while Naudet had a few members still remain with her; this split also tarnished the relationship between Naudet and Father Paccanari who had fallen into disgrace due to this. Naudet - as a result of the split - moved to Verona where she became a collaborator of Magdalene of Canossa who was the founder of the Daughters of Charity. The pair collaborated from 1808 to 1816.

Naudet desired to devote her life to the education of girls and in 1816 established the Sisters of the Holy Family in the former convent of Saint Teresa in Verona. She found great assistance in Gaspar Bertoni as well as other figures like Louis Fusari (the superior of the Oratorian Priests in Verona) and John Rozaven. She focused the curriculum of her congregation to the civic and moral education for girls in addition to their religious formation and she was known to demonstrate apostolic ardor; she was also noted for her active life simultaneous to a contemplative life. She also focused the curriculum on drawing and languages such as French and English; she also focused on catechism and economics. On 23 December 1833 the order was approved following the papal approval of Pope Gregory XVI.

Naudet died on 17 August 1834 in Verona; her final words: "I want only what God wills!" Her remains were transferred in 1958 to the Mother House of her congregation.

== Beatification process ==
The beatification proceedings commenced in Verona on 8 June 1971 under Pope Paul VI in a diocesan process that spanned until 24 April 1973. The commencement of the cause in 1971 designated Naudet with the posthumous title Servant of God. The Congregation for the Causes of Saints validated the process in Rome on 7 January 1994 and would later accept the Positio in 1996. This marked the beginning of the "Roman Phase" in which the Congregation would evaluate the work of the diocesan process. The cause was relegated to the historical commission; the historians approved the continuation of the cause on 5 November 1996.

Naudet was proclaimed to be Venerable on 6 July 2007 after Pope Benedict XVI approved the fact that Naudet had lived a model Christian life of heroic virtue which he deemed she exercised to a favorable degree.

The miracle needed for her beatification was investigated on a local level and was validated on 12 May 2006. The Rome-based medical board advising the Congregation for the Causes of Saints granted their approval to the healing as being a miracle on 3 July 2014 in what was an affirmative vote. Pope Francis approved this miracle on 21 December 2016. Her beatification took place on 29 April 2017 in the Basilica of Sant'Anastasia in Verona and was presided over by Cardinal Angelo Amato.
