= Chinese Cinderella and the Secret Dragon Society =

2004 novel by Adeline Yen Mah

- 2004 Puffin edition
- Author: Adeline Yen Mah
- Cover artist: Adeline Yen Mah
- Language: English
- Series: Chinese Cinderella Series
- Genre: Children's novel historical novel
- Published: 5 Aug 2004 Puffin Books
- Publication place: United States
- Media type: Print (Paperback)
- Pages: 280
- Preceded by: Chinese Cinderella
- Followed by: Chinese Cinderella: The Mystery of the Song Dynasty Painting

Chinese Cinderella and the Secret Dragon Society is a 2004 historical novel by Adeline Yen Mah. It is the fictional sequel to her autobiography for children, Chinese Cinderella.

== Summary ==
The main character is a twelve-year-old girl called Ye Xian who lives in China in the middle of World War II. Like the author, Ye Xian is deemed to bring bad luck because of the death of her mother when Ye Xian was five years old. Despite the many years that has passed (Ye Xian is now twelve years old), her father still rarely speaks to her and his new girlfriend despises her. They haven't gotten married yet, but Ye Xian is still told to call her "Niang", the Chinese term for "mother". Her father's sister, 'Big Aunt', is not pleased with this and insists that Ye Xian call her "Father's New Woman" instead, which Ye Xian gleefully does behind her back.

One day after school, Ye Xian comes across an incredible roadshow circus act consisting of only three boys around her age. One of the acrobats of around her age playfully gives her a business card which she accepts. Ye Xian goes to Big Aunt's house for her English lesson, but Big Aunt had to leave. She headed home scared that Niang might abuse her. After Niang physically abuses her again, Ye Xian stirs up her courage and quiet anger and rebels against Niang, insulting her in the process and causing her father to throw her out of the house onto the dangerous streets. In desperation, she remembers the business card which she had left in her pocket and locates the place stated on it: a bookshop. There, she meets the boy, David Black, and an old woman whom she calls Grandma Wu. After telling them of her predicament, David and Grandma Wu offer to let Ye Xian stay with them, which she does so gratefully. When reaching her new quarters, she also meets Marat and Sam, two other boys that were part of the circus show and are David's friends. They soon grow close and David affectionately names her CC, short for Chinese Cinderella, after hearing of her past and likening it to the tale of Cinderella.

Her new life begins with the boys and Grandma Wu. After seeing David demonstrate his kung fu ability, CC begs Grandma Wu to teach her so she will be just like David, Marat and Sam. At that, Grandma Wu introduces her to the Society of Wandering Knights, a secret society that includes the boys, and requests that CC join in exchange for training, which she agrees to. Meanwhile, she also goes to school as per normal with her father and Niang not bothering about her.

Soon, Marat's brother Ivanov sends a letter to the Society of Wandering Knights. Having been sent to fight on the front lines for China, he has been kidnapped by the Japanese and used as a translator due to his fluent language skills. The Society then embarks on a mission to help the American soldiers fighting for China, accompanied by Grandma Wu's son, Master Wu, and his giant panda Mei Mei. Travelling to Nan Tian Island, they help five crew members of one of the American planes, called the Ruptured Duck, and the children form a friendship with the five. As they try to return to the boat home the children enter the forest, meeting a lone Japanese soldier who is not much older than them. Although the atmosphere is tense at first, they make friends until he is called back to his plane. The boys and CC meet back with Grandma Wu and Master Wu to return to headquarters, including Big Aunt, whom CC is delighted and overjoyed to see again.

However, the Japanese, angered by the escaping of the American bombers, decide to punish the Chinese at Nan Tian Island through a massacre. Master Wu returns from the area after depositing Mei Mei in Sichuan and informs them gravely that Big Aunt and many other Chinese people have been murdered.

== Reception ==
In a starred review, Publishers Weekly called Chinese Cinderella and the Secret Dragon Society a "riveting" and "gripping tale based on a true event [that] meshes action and suspense with Eastern philosophy to create a provocative and educational read". Similarly, CM Magazine's Ruth Latta referred to the novel as an "ambitious" and "multi-layered adventure" that "quietly educates young readers" as "Yen Mah skillfully works in much information about Chinese culture". Further, the novel discuses "religious differences" in a manner that allows young people to "conclud[e] that there is truth in all religions", according to Latta. School Library Journal's Barbara Scotto also discussed the inclusion of religion in the novel, pointing to a scene in which the children engage a rescued pilot " in a thoughtful discussion about the universality of people's belief systems and their right to believe as they wish". With this, Scotto determined that the "novel is clear about the values that are important to the author".

Latta also noted that although the novel is labeled as "fantasy", it "is rooted in reality" with several historical incidents. For instance, "the rescue of the American airmen" is based on a 1942 plane crash in which several airmen under the command of Jimmy Doolittle were imprisoned. In the novel, "Yen Mah quotes from the actual letters of three of these prisoners". In a historical note, Yen Mah expresses this, as well as the fact that, historically, the airmen did not survive. Latta writes, "In distorting the fact that they all died, Yen Mah breaks a rule of historical fiction. It is one thing to have fictional characters walking hand in hand with real people of the past through historic events. But to change the outcome of an actual event is to go too far." Latta further expressed that such changes may be acceptable in an "alternative history" novel but argues that Chinese Cinderella and the Secret Dragon Society is a "traditional, time-tested type of historical novel".
