= Esmeralda Rego de Jesus Araujo =

East Timorese nun

- Born: 1959 or 1960 (age 64–65)
- Occupation: Catholic Nun Human Rights Advocate

Esmeralda Rego de Jesus Araujo (born 1959 or 1960), also known as Sister Esmeralda, is an East Timorese Catholic nun and human rights advocate. She was the head of the Canossian Convent in East Timor.

== Early life and education ==
Esmeralda Rego de Jesus Araujo is the daughter of a local chief of Hatulia in Ermera. She was educated.

== Career ==
As a young woman she worked with the East Timorese resistance before joining the Roman Catholic Canossian order of nuns. During the violence before independence, she worked hard to protect families and children. Sister Esmeralda was an outspoken supporter of independence, saying that the referendum would show the world once and for all that the East Timorese desired independence.

During this period there were several women who formed the main 'nerve centres' of political work in East Timor including, Sister Lourdes (in Dare) and Sister Esmeralda, who took responsibility for 1,500 or more refugees in the United Nations Mission in East Timor compound in 1999. Despite directly confronting the local militia, Sister Esmeralda and 700-800 refugees were forced from their convent, at gun point. She led the group of mostly women and children to a UN compound. Sister Esmeralda worked closely with the United Nations in East Timor.

In 1999, she contacted the Vatican news agency and pleaded for help from the outside world, warning that, when the United Nations left, the militias would go on a killing rampage. Sister Esmeralda feared that the pull out of the UN would lead to massacres.

In 2001, as part of the Inter-religious Tolerance project working group, Sister Esmeralda told "major stake holders" and representatives from Catholic Relief Services of her upbringing in a multi-religious community.
