= Canossians =

Catholic religious institute

Canossian Daughters of Charity
- Abbreviation: FdCC
- Formation: 1828; 198 years ago
- Type: Religious institute (Catholic)
- Headquarters: Via della Stazione di Ottavia, Rome, Italy
- Superior General: Margaret Cocheekkaran Peter, FdCC
- Website: www.fdcc.org

The Daughters of Charity of Canossa, Servants of the Poor (Latin: Figlie della carita canossiani), also known as the Institute of Saint Magdalen of Canossa, the Canossian Sisters or simply the Canossians, is a Catholic religious institute for women. It was founded in 1828 by Magdalene of Canossa and its members take the post-nominal letters FdCC.

The Canossian Sisters are part of the larger Canossian family, which includes two religious institutes and three affiliated lay associations.

== History ==
The Canossians were founded by Magdalen of Canossa in Verona, Italy, in 1808. On February 27, 1860, six Canossian sisters from Venice and Padua began their journey to Hong Kong arriving there on April 12, 1860. From there the sisters went to Macau and then to Southeast Asia.

Today they count eighteen provinces with approximately 2,700 sisters in more than 336 communities and in 32 countries around the world. Their primary works of charity include education, catechesis, and care of the sick. The General House is in Rome. (FDCC is the Italian abbreviation of "Figlie Della Carità Canossiane").

ENCA or Enlace Canossiano America (Canossian Network in America) is the union of the three Canossian Provinces in America: Brazil, Argentina and North America. It includes all the Canossian sisters residing in America.

Since 1988 the sisters help with pastoral work, teaching and hospital visitation the Chinese Community and the new Chinese immigrants at Canadian Martyrs Parish in Richmond in the Archdiocese of Vancouver, British Columbia.

In the United States the Canossian Daughters of Charity run a retreat center, the Canossian Spirituality Center in Albuquerque, New Mexico. The sisters in Macau spread out to other countries in Southeast Asia towards the end of the 19th century.

In 1894, mainly Italian and Portuguese-speaking sisters arrived at the Portuguese Mission at St. Joseph's Church in Singapore (then part of the Straits Settlements) and expanded to Malaya, both of which were part of the British Empire. As of 2008 the sisters are the largest religious orders in the Archdiocese of Singapore and operate three mainstream schools – St Anthony's Canossian Primary & Secondary School & Canossa Catholic Primary School; two pre-schools/kindergartens, one special school for the deaf and two homes for the Aged Sick providing palliative care. In addition, the sisters offer retreats and spiritual direction. In the Philippines, Mother Anna Bautista led a group of sisters and founded the first mission and school in the country in 1954.

=== Canossian Sons of Charity ===
The Canossian Sons of Charity, (Canossian Fathers), were founded in Venice in 1831. They count today about 200 brothers and priests dedicated to the education of children and young people through catechesis in schools, orphanages, youth centers (oratories) and other works of charity towards the poor and the least. They are present in Italy, Brazil, Kenya, Tanzania, India and the Philippines.

In 1986 upon the invitation of the late Cardinal Jaime Sin, Archbishop of Manila, the Canossian Fathers in Italy sent two priests to start a mission and to open a seminary.

=== Lay affiliates ===
- Association of Lay Canossians (ALC) (Canossian Tertiaries or Collaborators) are married and unmarried lay men and women of diverse nationalities who feel called to live the charism and the spirituality of the Canossian Family in their personal, family and social life. They received their "Plan for the Tertiaries" in 1835 and today serve in Asia, Europe, Oceania, Africa and the Americas. They are counting about 2,150 members. (ALC stands for "Associazione Laici Canossiani").
- Canossian Alumni Association, a membership society registered in Singapore for former students of the various Canossian schools in Singapore.
- Canossian Foundation (ONLUS), established in 2004 in Rome, is a legal non-profit entity for human development, to promote, coordinate and sustain initiatives that favour the poorest and the most excluded in the world and also to raise funds for the Canossian Missions in Brazil, the Philippines, India, and Africa. (ONLUS in Italian stands for "Organizzazione Non Lucrativa di Utilità Sociale").
- International Canossian Voluntary Service (VOICA) (Canossian Volunteers) was legally established in 1996 to support and direct young people and adults from all parts of the world who are seeking to deepen the meaning and purpose of their lives by a personal experience of shared community life in a short or long term voluntary service of the poor. They are presently sharing in Canossian missionary projects in Togo, Congo, Uganda, Albania, Indonesia, Angola, Paraguay and Brasil. (VOICA is the abbreviation of "Volontariato Internazionale CAnossiano").

== Schools ==
=== Hong Kong ===
- Canossa College (formerly Canossian Convent Secondary School)
- Canossa Primary School
- Canossa School
- Holy Angels Canossian School
- Holy Family Canossian College
- Holy Family Canossian School (Kowloon Tong)
- Holy Family Canossian School
- Pui Tak Canossian College
- Sacred Heart Canossian College
- Sacred Heart Canossian School
- St. Francis' Canossian College
- St. Francis' Canossian School
- St. Mary's Canossian College

=== Australia ===
- Canossa School in Ingham, Queensland

=== India ===
- Canossa Convent High School in Andheri
- Canossa Convent High School in Dhule
- Canossa Convent High School in Mahim
- Canossa Convent School in Faizabad, Uttar Pradesh
- Canossa School in Lucknow
- Canossa, Vasai
- Elementary School "English Together"] in Bareilly
- St. Joseph's College for Women in Alappuzha
- St. Josephs school Belgaum
- St. Philomena's Girls High School] in Poonthura

=== Macau ===
- Sacred Heart Canossian College

=== Malaysia ===
- Sekolah Kebangsaan Canossian Convent, Kluang
- Sekolah Kebangsaan Canossian Convent, Segamat
- Sekolah Kebangsaan Sacred Heart Convent, Malacca
- Sekolah Menengah Kebangsaan Canossa Convent, Malacca
- Sekolah Menengah Kebangsaan Canossian Convent, Kluang
- Sekolah Menengah Kebangsaan Canossian Convent, Segamat

=== Singapore ===
- Canossa Catholic Primary School
- Canossaville Pre-school
- Canossian Kindergarten
- Canossian School for the Deaf
- Saint Anthony's Canossian Primary School, Bedok
- Saint Anthony's Canossian Secondary School

=== Philippines ===
- Canossa Academy in Calamba, Laguna
- Canossa Academy in Lipa, Batangas
- Canossa College in San Pablo, Laguna
- Canossa School in Santa Rosa, Laguna

== Hospitals ==
- Canossa Health and Social Center Bulihan, Silang, Cavite, Philippines
- Canossa Hospital (Caritas)
- Canossa Private Hospital, Oxley, Brisbane, Australia
- Saint Josephine Bakhita Dispensary in Agoe, Togo

== Venerated members ==
=== Saints ===
- The foundress of the Canossians, Magdalen of Canossa (1774–1835), was canonized on 2 October 1988 by Pope John Paul II.
- Josephine Bakhita of Sudan (1869–1947) was canonized on 1 October 2000 by Pope John Paul II.

=== Members proposed for sainthood ===
Canossian Daughters and Sons of Charity who are proposed for canonization by the Church include:

- Servant of God Dalisay Lazaga Lazaga's cause was opened on June 28, 2012, by the Congregation for the Causes of Saints.
- Servant of God Luigia Grassi
- Servant of God Teresa Pera: Born on February 16, 1870, in Turin, Italy, became a professed religious of the Canossian Daughters of Charity. She died on June 26, 1938, in Besozzo, Varese, Italy. Her cause was opened for the decree for heroic virtue.
- Venerable Fernanda Riva: Born on May 1, 1920, in Monza, Italy, She became a Canossian Daughters of Charity and went to India. She died on January 22, 1956, in Mumbai (a.k.a. Bombay), Maharashtra, India. She was venerated on June 28, 2012, by Pope Benedict XVI for the decree of heroic virtue.

== Other notable members ==
- Esmeralda Rego de Jesus Araujo
