= Canossa College =

Catholic, all-girls' school in Hong Kong

Coordinates: 22.2892°N 114.2112°E

- 嘉諾撒書院

Location
- 10 Hoi Chak Street; Quarry Bay; Hong Kong

Information
- Motto: Humility, Respect, Kindness & Love
- Established: 1959
- Founder: Magdalena of Canossa
- Houses: Humility; Respect; Kindness; Love
- Website: http://www.canossa.edu.hk/

Canossa College
- Traditional Chinese: 嘉諾撒書院
- Simplified Chinese: 嘉诺撒书院
Transcriptions
Standard Mandarin
- Hanyu Pinyin: Jiānuòsā Shūyuàn
Yue: Cantonese
- Jyutping: gaa1 nok6 saat3 syu1 jyun6*2

Canossa College (Chinese: 嘉諾撒書院) is a Catholic, all-girls' school, founded in 1959 in Hong Kong. Canossa College is funded by the Government as a subsidised school.

== History ==
- 1890 Canossian Sisters in Italy came to Hong Kong in 1860 and to set up the new Canossian Convent Secondary School in 1890
- 1891 Mr. David Sasson donated 3000 sq. ft. of land in Shaukeiwan to establish the House of Shaukeiwan and a primary school for Chinese children.
- 1932 The primitive House was replaced by a solid three-storey building. The government subsidized Primary School and the Convent, serving pupils of normal sight since 1938.
- 1941–45 Occupied by the Japanese Military government during World War II
- 1950 The school and the convent were returned to the Institute and the Chinese Primary School was restored in 1951.
- 1959 Canossian Convent Secondary School was officiated with an enrolment of 92 students.
- 1984 To cope with the rapid development in the Eastern District of Hong Kong, the school was transferred to the present site. The secondary section of the School was renamed Canossa College and the primary section Canossa School (H.K.).
- 2004 A four-storey wing was erected from the parking area.

== School clubs ==
There are 42 clubs in total. Form one to form five students are required to participate in at least one extra-curricular activity (either an academic club, a sports team or an instrument class) and at most four clubs. Catholic students are required to attend events organised by the Religious Affairs Club on top of meetings of other clubs.

Language	Academics	Sports	Uniform	Others	Services
Chinese Society	Science Society	Sports Association	Girl Guides	Arts Society	Civic Ambassadors Assembly
English Society	Mathematics Society	Badminton Team	Red Cross	Cookery Club	National Ambassadors Club
Putonghua Society		Swimming Team		Computer Society	Community Youth Club
Chinese Debate Society		Table Tennis Team		Photography Club	Foster Prefects
English Debate Society		Tennis Team		Make-up Class	Library Prefects
The Breeze (Chinese) (School press)		Trampoline Team		English Drama Club	Discipline Prefects
The Breeze (English) (School press)		Volleyball Team		Junior Police Call	Student Union
		Houses		Bridge Club	Religious Affairs Committee
				Japanese Culture Club	

Club committees are either appointed by teachers or elected by club members on the first meeting.

Eighty-percent of attendance is required or ranking will not be shown on students' report card.
