= Antonio Provolo Institute for the Deaf =

Antonio Provolo Institute for the Deaf (Italian: Compagnia di Maria per l'educazione dei sordomuti) is a Catholic school for deaf children in Verona, Italy.

The school was founded in 1830 by a priest, Antonio Provolo.

== Catholic sexual abuse scandal ==
This school is one among many where former students recently made claims that they were abused for years by the schools priests. Two priests, Fr. Nicola Corradi and Fr. Horacio Corbacho, and three other employees were arrested in Argentina in 2016 for abuse of children at one of the institute's schools in Mendoza, Argentina. Corradi first faced accusations of committing sex abuse at the Verona campus in 2009 and was flagged by the Diocese of Verona in 2011 following months of hearings. On May 6, 2017, Argentine authorities charged Japanese nun Sr. Kosako Kumiko with abusing children at the very same Argentine school as well, and also for covering up sex abuse committed by the other two priests. On June 15, 2019, it was announced that the two priests will stand trial on August 5, 2019. However, the trial took place in Argentina, where they were jailed after being accused of sexually abusing 22 children at the Argentine school.

On November 25, 2019. both Corradi and Carbacho were convicted. Also convicted was one of the schools former gardeners. Both Corradi and Carbacho received prison sentences of more than 40 years, with Corradi receiving 42 years and Carbacho receiving 45 years. The gardener, Armando Gómez, was jailed for 18 years. Apart from Gómez, several other school staff, including Kumiko, have been jailed for complicity since the abuse allegations surfaced in 2016. At the time of the conviction, Kumiko was still being held in prison, but had yet to start trial.
