= Magdalene of Canossa =

Italian Roman Catholic saint

Saint Magdalene of Canossa
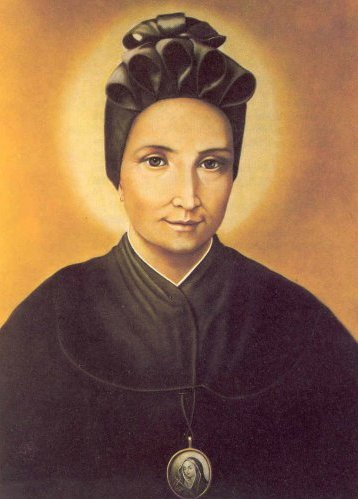

Virgin
- Born: 1 March 1774; Verona, Republic of Venice
- Died: 10 April 1835 (aged 61); Verona
- Venerated in: Catholic Church
- Beatified: 7 December 1941, Saint Peter's Basilica by Pope Pius XII
- Canonized: 2 October 1988, Saint Peter's Square by Pope John Paul II
- Feast: 10 April; 8 May (Canossians and Bergamo); 9 May (Milan)

Magdalena di Canossa (1 March 1774 – 10 April 1835) was an Italian religious sister and the foundress of the two Canossian congregations. Magdalena was a leading advocate for the poor in her region after she witnessed first hand the plight of the poor following the spillover effects of the French Revolution into the Italian peninsula through the Napoleonic invasion of the northern territories. Canossa collaborated with humanitarians such as Leopoldina Naudet and Antonio Rosmini in her mission of promoting the needs of the poor and setting a new method of religious life for both men and women.

Her beatification was celebrated in Rome on 7 December 1941 and she was canonized in Saint Peter's Square on 2 October 1988.

== Life ==
=== Childhood and obligations ===
Magdalene of Canossa was born on 1 March 1774 in Verona to the Marquis Ottavio di Canossa (1740 – 1 October 1779) and Teresa Szluha (3 January 1753 – 19 May 1807; a Hungarian countess). An ancestor was the Countess Matilda Canossa who helped facilitate the meeting between Pope Gregory VII and Emperor Henry IV. Her parents married in August 1770 in Odenburg. Their first two children Carlo Vincenzo (1771) died soon after his birth and therefore she was the third-born after Laura Maria (1772; an arrival poorly appreciated). She was baptized on 2 March 1774.

Her mother later gave birth to another son who died right after the birth. But in 1776 the male heir that her parents desired was born – Boniface – and after him two other girls (Rosa in 1777 and Leonora in 1779). In 1779 her father died in an accident while at a villa on vacation in Grezzano. In 1781 her mother left their palace and married the widower Marquis Odoardo Zanetti from Mantua on 25 August with the permission of her father-in-law. The children were placed under the guardianship of their uncle Girolamo.

In 1791 she tried twice to join the Carmelites but discerned that this was not her vocation so returned home and undertook the running of her large estate. In 1797, Napoleon was a guest at their palace where she received him; he returned as a guest twice more in 1805 and 1807.

Canossa saw her town as one in which the poor suffered and grew worse due to all the social upheavals caused as a result of the invasions of the French forces and the opposing forces of the Austrian Empire which would gain control of Verona. This situation provoked her desire to serve the needs of the unfortunate. Canossa studied under the Carmelites in Trent and then at Conegliano.

=== Foundation and recognition ===
Using her inheritance she began charitable work among the poor and sick, in hospitals and in their homes, and also among delinquent and abandoned girls. On 1 April 1808 she was given an abandoned convent where she took in two poor girls from the slum of the San Zeno neighborhood to care for them and to also provide them with an adequate education. One month later on 8 May she moved out of her ancestral palace and moved into what is now the Saint Joseph Convent where other women soon joined her and with whom she formed the Canossian Daughters. In May 1810 the Servants of God Father Antonio Angelo and Brother Marco Antonio Cavanis invited her to Venice for collaboration. In the meantime, her uncle Girolamo died in July 1814, entrusting his motherless son Carlino (born c. 1797) to her care.

Canossa wanted the Pope to legitimize her work by granting formal recognition to the congregation. She decided to meet with Pope Pius VII in Genoa in 1815 and arrived in Milan on 14 May to learn that the Pope had left for Rome. She reached the Pope on 23 May at Piacenza where she was received in an audience but she recounted later that she lost her courage before him. The Pope noticed and did not wish to prolong the audience further so instructed Canossa to follow the usual protocol and send the Rule and other documents to Roman authorities for assessment. She tried again some hours later and was again brought before Pius VII who gave her the same vague response; this hurt her because she thought the audience was too formal with a lack of concrete results.

The new congregation started to care for poor children and to serve in the hospitals. Once word of their work spread, the congregation was requested to start new communities in other cities of the region. Soon there were convents of the religious established in Venice (1812) and Milan (1816) as well as in Bergamo (1820) and Trent (1824). In 1824 she travelled to Rovato where she briefly collaborated with Annunciata Astoria Cocchetti. Magdalene drew up a Rule for the congregation, and it received pontifical approval from Pope Leo XII on 23 December 1828 in the papal brief Si Nobis.

Magdalene desired to provide boys with the same care her religious sisters were providing to girls. To this end she invited the priest Francesco Luzzi to open a small chapel adjacent to the sisters' convent of Santa Lucia in Venice. He opened this house on 23 May 1831. In 1833 the priest saw two laymen join him (Giuseppe Carsana and Benedetto Belloni) and who later took over the work of the place when Luzzi left to become a Carmelite friar. The men's congregation were given a religious habit in 1860 from the Patriarch of Venice, Angelo Francesco Ramazzotti, and were given a Rule in 1897 from Domenico Agostini who was a later patriarch.

Canossa maintained a partnership with Leopoldina Naudet though their mutual esteem for each other did not prevent disagreements between their individual methods, which led to the dissolution of their partnership sometime around 1816. Canossa also tried to establish a male congregation alongside Antonio Provolo sometime in the 1820s but was unsuccessful in this venture. It was in February 1820 that she first met Antonio Rosmini and Rosmini's sister Margherita became a close friend of Canossa and joined the congregation on 2 October 1824. The death of Pius VII in 1823 halted work in the recognition of the congregation and she was upset that approval had not been granted since her meeting with the Pope less than a decade before. Canossa believed she would have better luck with his successor Pope Leo XII and in September 1828 left to go to Rome to request of him the formal approval needed. She stopped over at Coriano to visit Maria Elisabetta Renzi and stopped at Loreto before reaching Rome in November. In the audience with the Pope he asked her to present a shorter version of the Rule so that his approval could come quicker; he also appointed a commission that the Cardinal Carlo Odescalchi led to assess the rule and the request. This led to Leo XII granting approval for the congregation just before Christmas. In 1833 she was profoundly affected by the death of Margherita Rosmini who was a close friend.

=== Declining health and death ===
In 1834 she organized the Spiritual Exercises for the congregation in Verona before setting off for Venice before returning to Verona in May. That autumn she went to Bergamo and then to Milan. Canossa died on 10 April 1835 after a period of deteriorating health; she had known in January that her time was coming to an end, and returned to Verona from Milan in March.

She was aunt of Luigi di Canossa, later Bishop of Verona and Cardinal.

== Canonization ==
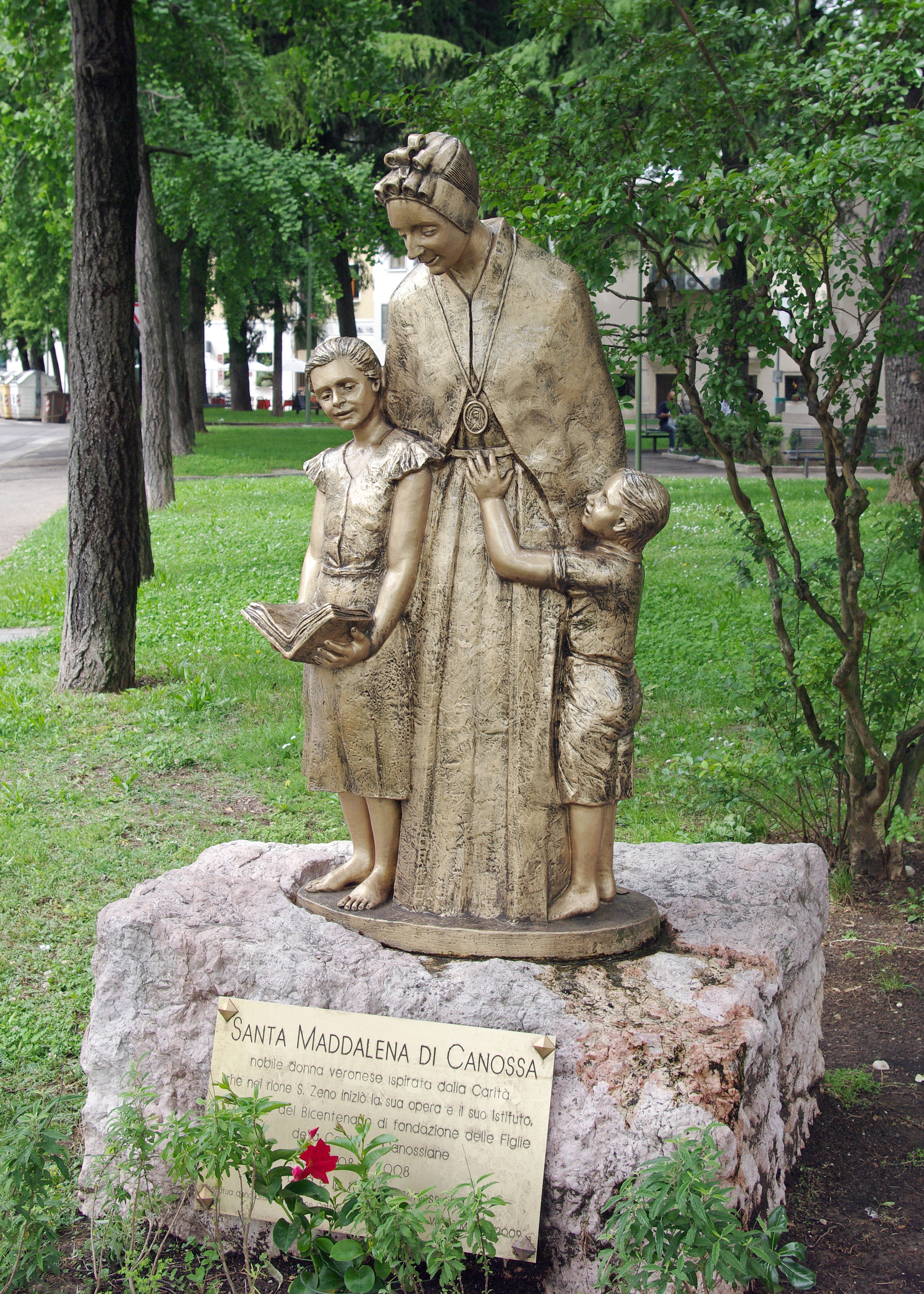
Monument in Verona

The cause for her canonization opened under Pope Pius IX on 15 February 1877 and she became titled as a Servant of God while the later confirmation of her model life of heroic virtue enabled Pope Pius XI to name her as Venerable on 6 January 1927. Pope Pius XII presided over her beatification in Saint Peter's Basilica on 7 December 1941.

Her beatification depended upon a miracle attributed to her intercession with one being investigated from 13 January to 6 March 1955 before the Congregation for Rites validated the informative process of investigation in Rome on 25 November. Yet the cause remained inactive, since a reform of the canonization process in 1983 meant that miracles were assessed in a different manner. But it resumed on 1 July 1987 when a medical panel approved it, as did the theologians on 16 October 1987 and the members of the Congregation for the Causes of Saints on 17 November 1987. Pope John Paul II approved this miracle on 11 December 1987 and presided over Canossa's canonization in Saint Peter's Square on 2 October 1988.

The Canossians have communities in each continent; the congregation for men works in places such as India and Brazil.
