= List of primary schools in Hong Kong =

The list of primary schools in Hong Kong is arranged by 18 districts of Hong Kong. It includes government schools, aided schools, Direct Subsidy Scheme (DSS) schools, private schools, as well as English Schools Foundation (ESF) schools and other international schools.

== Primary schools in Hong Kong ==
=== Central and Western District ===
Primary schools in Central and Western District:

- Bonham Road Government Primary School
- Carmel School, Hong Kong
- Catholic Mission School
- Central and Western District St. Anthony's School
- Chiu Sheung School, Hong Kong
- German Swiss International School
- Glenealy School - an English Schools Foundation school
- The Harbour School
- Hong Kong Academy
- Island Christian Academy
- Kau Yan School
- King's College Old Boys' Association Primary School
- King's College Old Boys' Association Primary School No.2
- Li Sing Primary School
- North Point Government Primary School (Cloud View Road)
- Peak School - an English Schools Foundation school
- Sacred Heart Canossian School
- Sacred Heart Canossian School, Private Section
- San Wui Commercial Society School
- Sheng Kung Hui Kei Yan Primary School
- Sheng Kung Hui Lui Ming Choi Memorial Primary School
- Sheng Kung Hui St. Matthew's Primary School
- Sheng Kung Hui St. Peter's Primary School
- St. Anthony's School, Hong Kong
- St. Charles School
- St. Clare's Primary School
- S.K.H. St James' Primary School
- St. Louis School (Primary Section)
- St. Stephen's Girls' Primary School
- St. Paul's Primary School

=== Eastern District ===
Primary schools in Eastern District:

- Aldrich Bay Government Primary School
- Buddhist Chung Wah Kornhill Primary School
- Canossa School (Hong Kong)
- Caritas Lok Yi School - special-needs school for intellectual disability
- CCC Kei Wan Primary School
- CCC Kei Wan Primary School (Aldrich Bay)
- Chan's Creative School (Hong Kong Island)
- Chinese International School
- Chinese Methodist School (North Point)
- Chinese Methodist School, Tanner Hill
- Delia School of Canada
- ELCHK Faith Love Lutheran School
- Endeavour Leung Lee Sau Yu Memorial Primary School
- Grace Christian Academy
- HKCWC Hioe Tjo Yoeng Primary School
- HKUGA Primary School
- Hon Wah College (Primary Section)
- International Montessori School - an IMEF School
- Kiangsu and Chekiang Primary School
- Meng Tak Catholic School
- North Point Government Primary School
- North Point Methodist Primary School
- Po Leung Kuk Yu Lee Mo Fan Memorial School - special-needs school for intellectual disability
- Pui Kiu Primary School
- Quarry Bay School - an English Schools Foundation school
- Rotary Club of Hong Kong Island West Hong Chi Morninghope School - special-needs school for intellectual disability
- Salesian English School
- The Salvation Army Ann Wyllie Memorial School
- The Salvation Army Centaline Charity Fund School
- Shanghai Alumni Primary School
- Shau Kei Wan Government Primary School(ok somebody help create a site for this)
- Shaukiwan Tsung Tsin School
- Sheng Kung Hui Chai Wan St. Michael's Primary School
- Sheng Kung Hui St. Michael's Primary School
- Taikoo Primary School

=== Islands District ===
Primary schools in Islands District:

- Bui O Public School
- CCC Cheung Chau Church Kam Kong Primary School
- CCC Tai O Primary School
- Cheung Chau Sacred Heart School
- Ching Chung Hau Po Woon Primary School
- Discovery Bay International School
- Discovery College - replaced from Bauhinia School (an English Schools Foundation school) in August 2007. This school is the new private independent school of ESF
- Discovery Mind Primary School
- HKFEW Wong Cho Bau School
- Hong Kong International Learning Academy (HKILA) - Discovery Bay
- Ho Yu College and Primary School (Sponsored by Sik Sik Yuen)
- Holy Family School, Hong Kong
- Kwok Man School
- Kind Hing Trinity International Kindergarten and Nursery
- Lantau International School
- Ling Liang Church Sau Tak Primary School
- Mui Wo School
- Mui Wo OWLS School
- Northern Lamma School
- Po On Commercial Association Wan Ho Kan Primary School
- Salvation Army Lam Butt Chung Memorial School
- Sheng Kung Hui Wei Lun Primary School
- Tung Chung Catholic School
- Tung Wan Mok Law Shui Wah School - school for social development

=== Kowloon City District ===
Primary schools in Kowloon City District:

- Alliance Primary School Kowloon Tong
- Alliance Primary School, Whampoa
- Aoi Pui School, Kowloon
- American International School (Primary Branch)
- Australian International School Hong Kong
- Beacon Hill School - an English Schools Foundation school
- CCC Kei Wa Primary School (Kowloon Tong)
- CCC Wanchai Church Kei To Primary School (Kowloon City)
- Chan Sui Ki (La Salle) Primary School
- Christian Alliance P. C. Lau Memorial International School
- Creative Primary School
- Diocesan Boys' School Primary Division
- Diocesan Preparatory School
- ELCHK Hung Hom Lutheran Primary School
- Emmanuel Primary School, Kowloon
- Farm Road Government Primary School
- First Assembly of God Primary School and Kindergarten
- GCEPSA Whampoa Primary School
- Heep Yunn Primary School
- Holy Angels Canossian School
- Holy Carpenter Primary School
- Holy Family Canossian School
- Holy Family Canossian School (Kowloon Tong)
- Holy Trinity Primary School
- Hop Yat Church School
- Iu Shan School
- Jockey Club Sarah Roe School - an English Schools Foundation school for special educational needs
- Kingston International School
- Kowloon Junior School - an English Schools Foundation school (for P1 through P3 pupils)
- Kowloon Tong Funful English Primary School
- Kowloon Tong Government Primary School
- Kowloon Tong School (Primary Section)
- Kowloon True Light Middle School (Primary Section)
- La Salle Primary School
- Ling To Catholic Primary School
- Lok Sin Tong Primary School
- Ma Tau Chung Government Primary School
- Ma Tau Chung Government Primary School (Hung Hom Bay)
- Mary Rose School - special-needs school for intellectual disability
- Maryknoll Convent School (Primary Section)
- Munsang College Primary School
- Oblate Primary School
- Oxbridge British School
- Po Leung Kuk Camoes Tan Siu Lin Primary School
- Po Leung Kuk Lam Man Chan English Primary School
- Po Leung Kuk Madam Chan Wai Chow Memorial School
- Pooi To Primary School
- Pui Ching Primary School
- Sear Rogers International School - Peninsula
- Sheng Kung Hui Fung Kei Millennium Primary School
- Sheng Kung Hui Fung Kei Primary School
- Sheng Kung Hui Good Shepherd Primary School
- St. Eugene De Mazenod Oblate Primary School
- St. Johannes College (Primary Section)
- St. Rose of Lima's School
- Think International School
- Yew Chung International School

=== Kwai Tsing District ===
Primary schools in Kwai Tsing District:

- Asbury Methodist Primary School
- Buddhist Lam Bing Yim Memorial School (Sponsored by HKBA)
- Buddhist Lim Kim Tian Memorial Primary School
- CCC Chuen Yuen Second Primary School
- CCC Kei Chun Primary School
- Cho Yiu Catholic Primary School
- CNEC Lui Ming Choi Primary School
- CNEC Ta Tung School
- Delia (Man Kiu) English Primary School
- ELCHK Kwai Shing Lutheran Primary School
- Father Cucchiara Memorial School
- HKSYC & IA Chan Nam Chong Memorial School - special-needs school for intellectual disability
- Hong Chi Winifred Mary Cheung Morn School - special-needs school for intellectual disability
- Lutheran School for the Deaf - special-needs school for hearing impairment
- Po Leung Kuk Castar Primary School
- Po Leung Kuk Chan Yat Primary School
- Po Leung Kuk Mr. and Mrs. Chan Pak Keung Tsing Yi School - special-needs school for intellectual disability
- Salesian Yip Hon Millennium Primary School
- Salesian Yip Hon Primary School
- Sam Shui Natives Association Lau Pun Cheung School - special-needs school for intellectual disability
- Shek Lei Catholic Primary School
- Shek Lei St. John's Catholic Primary School
- Sheng Kung Hui Chu Oi Primary School
- Sheng Kung Hui Chu Yan Primary School
- Sheng Kung Hui Ho Chak Wan Primary School
- Sheng Kung Hui Tsing Yi Chu Yan Primary School
- Sheng Kung Hui Tsing Yi Estate Ho Chak Wan Primary School
- Sheng Kung Hui Yan Laap Memorial Primary School
- Sheng Kung Hui Yan Laap Primary School
- Spastics Association of Hong Kong B. M. Kotewall Memorial School - special-needs school for physical disability
- SRBCEPSA Lee Yat Ngok Memorial School
- Tsing Yi Trade Association Primary School
- Tsuen Wan Trade Association Primary School
- Tung Wah Group of Hospitals Chow Yin Sum Primary School
- Tung Wah Group of Hospitals Ko Ho Ning Memorial Primary School
- Tung Wah Group of Hospitals Wong See Sum Primary School
- Yan Chai Hospital Chiu Tsang Hok Wan Primary School

=== Kwun Tong District ===
Primary schools in Kwun Tong District:

- Bishop Paschang Catholic School
- Buddhist Chi King Primary School
- Carmel Leung Sing Tak School
- CCC Kei Faat Primary School
- CCC Kei Faat Primary School (Yau Tong)
- CCC Kei Shun Special School - special-needs school for intellectual disability
- Conservative Baptist Lui Ming Choi Primary School
- Evan China Fellowship Holy Word School - special-needs school for intellectual disability
- Fukien Secondary School Affiliated School
- Hong Kong Red Cross Princess Alexandra School - special-needs school for physical disability
- Hong Kong Taoist Association Wun Tsuen School
- Hong Kong Taoist Association the Yuen Yuen Institute Chan Lui Chung Tak Memorial School
- Jordan Valley St. Joseph's Catholic Primary School
- Kowloon Bay St. John the Baptist Catholic Primary School
- Kwun Tong Government Primary School
- Kwun Tong Government Primary School (Sau Ming Road)
- Lam Tin Methodist Primary School
- Lok Sin Tong Yeung Chung Ming Primary School
- Lok Wah Catholic Primary School
- Man Kiu Association Primary School
- Mission Covenant Church Holm Glad Primary School
- Our Lady of China Catholic Primary School
- Ping Shek Estate Catholic Primary School
- Sau Mau Ping Catholic Primary School
- Sau Ming Primary School
- Sheng Kung Hui Kei Hin Primary School
- Sheng Kung Hui Kei Lok Primary School
- Sheng Kung Hui Kowloon Bay Kei Lok Primary School
- Sheng Kung Hui Lee Shiu Keung Primary School
- Sheng Kung Hui St. John's Primary School
- Sheng Kung Hui Tak Tin Lee Shiu Keung Primary School
- Sheng Kung Hui Yautong Kei Hin Primary School
- Society of Boys' Centres Shing Tak Centre School - school for social development
- St. Antonius Primary School
- St. Edward's Catholic Primary School
- St. John the Baptist Catholic Primary School
- St. Joseph's Anglo-Chinese Primary School
- St. Matthew's Lutheran School (Sau Mau Ping)

=== North District ===
Primary schools in North District:

- Alliance Primary School, Sheung Shui
- Fanling Assembly of God Church Primary School
- Fanling Government Primary School
- Fanling Public School
- FSFTF Fong Shu Chuen Primary School
- Fung Kai Innovative School
- Fung Kai Liu Yun-sum Memorial School
- Fung Kai No.1 Primary School
- HHCKLA Buddhist Chan Shi Wan Primary School
- HHCKLA Buddhist Ching Kok Lin Association School
- HHCKLA Buddhist Po Kwong School - special-needs school for intellectual disability
- HHCKLA Buddhist Wisdom Primary School
- Kam Tsin Village Ho Tung School
- Lee Chi Tat Memorial School
- Pentecostal Gin Mao Sheng Primary School
- Pentecostal Yu Leung Fat Primary School
- Pui Ling School of the Precious Blood
- Sha Tau Kok Central Primary School
- Shan Tsui Public School
- Shek Wu Hui Public School
- Sheng Kung Hui Ka Fuk Wing Chun Primary School
- Sheng Kung Hui Wing Chun Primary School
- Ta Ku Ling Ling Ying Public School
- The Salvation Army Centaline Charity Fund Queen’s Hill School
- The Salvation Army Shek Wu School - special-needs school for intellectual disability
- Tsang Mui Millennium School
- Tung Koon School
- Tung Wah Group of Hospitals Hong Kong and Kowloon Electrical Appliances Merchants Association Ltd. School
- Tung Wah Group of Hospitals Ma Kam Chan Memorial Primary School
- Wai Chow Public School (Sheung Shui)
- Yuk Yin School

=== Sai Kung District ===
Primary schools in Sai Kung District:

- Assembly of God Leung Sing Tak Primary School
- Chi Lin Buddhist Primary School
- Christian and Missionary Alliance Sun Kei Primary School
- Clearwater Bay School - an English Schools Foundation school
- Evangel College
- G. T. (Ellen Yeung) College
- Haven of Hope Sunnyside School - special-needs school for intellectual disability
- HHCKLA Buddhist Wong Cho Sum School
- HKCCC Union Logos Academy
- Hong Chi Morninghill School, Tsui Lam - special-needs school for intellectual disability
- Hong Kong Adventist Academy - a private school
- Hong Kong and Macau Lutheran Church Ming Tao Primary School
- Hong Kong and Macau Lutheran Church Primary School
- King Lam Catholic Primary School
- Lok Sin Tong Lau Tak Primary School
- Po Leung Kuk Fung Ching Memorial Primary School
- Po Leung Kuk Luk Hing Too Primary School
- Po Leung Kuk Wong Wing Shu Primary School
- Pok Oi Hospital Chan Kwok Wai Primary School
- Sai Kung Central Lee Siu Yam Memorial School
- Sai Kung Sung Tsun Catholic School (Primary Section)
- Sheng Kung Hui Tseung Kwan O Kei Tak Primary School
- Shun Tak Fraternal Association Leung Kit Wah Primary School
- Shrewsbury International School Hong Kong
- St. Andrew's Catholic Primary School
- Tseung Kwan O Catholic Primary School
- Tseung Kwan O Government Primary School
- Tseung Kwan O Methodist Primary School
- Tseung Kwan O Pui Chi School - special-needs school for intellectual disability
- Tung Wah Group of Hospitals Wong Yee Jar Jat Memorial Primary School
- Yan Chai Hospital Chan Iu Seng Primary School
- Yan Oi Tong Tin Ka Ping Primary School

=== Sha Tin District ===
Primary schools in Sha Tin District:

- Anfield School
- Baptist (Sha Tin Wai) Lui Ming Choi Primary School
- Baptist Lui Ming Choi Primary School
- Caritas Lok Jun School - special-needs school for intellectual disability
- Caritas Resurrection School - special-needs school for intellectual disability
- Carmel Alison Lam Primary School
- Chi Hong Primary School
- Choi Jun School - special-needs school for intellectual disability
- Christian Alliance H. C. Chan Primary School
- Christian Alliance Toi Shan H. C. Chan Primary School
- CUHKFAA Thomas Cheung School
- Dr. Catherine F. Woo Memorial School
- ELCHK Ma On Shan Lutheran Primary School
- ELCHK Wo Che Lutheran School
- Free Methodist Bradbury Chun Lei Primary School
- Free Methodist Mei Lam Primary School
- GCC & ITKD Cheong Wong Wai Primary School
- Hong Kong Baptist University Affiliated School Wong Kam Fai Secondary and Primary School
- Hong Kong Taoist Association Shun Yeung Primary School
- Immaculate Heart of Mary School
- International Christ School
- Kowloon City Baptist Church Hay Nien (Yan Ping) Primary School
- Kowloon City Baptist Church Hay Nien Primary School
- Leung Kui Kau Lutheran Primary School
- The Little Flower's Catholic Primary School
- Lung Kong WFSL Wong Yiu Nam Primary School
- Ma On Shan Ling Liang Primary School
- Ma On Shan Methodist Primary School
- Ma On Shan St. Joseph's Primary School
- Ng Clan's Association Tai Pak Memorial School
- Po Leung Kuk Chee Jing Yin Primary School
- Po Leung Kuk Chong Kee Ting Primary School
- Po Leung Kuk Dr. Jimmy Wong Chi-ho (Tin Sum Valley) Primary School
- Po Leung Kuk Riverain Primary School
- Po Leung Kuk Siu Hon-sum Primary School
- Pui Kiu College
- Renaissance College - a private school operated by the ESF Educational Services Ltd after 2006
- Salvation Army Tin Ka Ping School
- Sha Tin Government Primary School
- Sha Tin Methodist Primary School
- Sha Tin Wai Dr. Catherine F. Woo Memorial School
- Shatin Junior School - an English Schools Foundation school
- Shatin Public School - special-needs school for intellectual disability
- Shatin Tsung Tsin School
- Sheng Kung Hui Holy Spirit Primary School (Shatin)
- Sheng Kung Hui Ma On Shan Holy Spirit Primary School
- Spastics Association Hong Kong Ko Fook Iu Memorial School - special-needs school for physical disability
- Stewards Pooi Kei Primary School
- Tung Wah Group of Hospitals Sin Chu Wan Primary School

=== Sham Shui Po District ===
Primary schools in Sham Shui Po District:

- Bloom KKCA Academy
- St. Francis of Assisi's English Primary School
- Alliance Primary School, Tai Hang Tung
- Caritas Jockey Club Lok Yan School - special-needs school for intellectual disability
- CCC Heep Woh Primary School (Cheung Sha Wan)
- Chan's Creative School
- Chi Yun School - special-needs school for intellectual disability
- Delia English Primary School and Kindergarten
- ELCHK Faith Lutheran School
- Five Districts Business Welfare Association School
- Fuk Wing Street Government Primary School
- Good Counsel Catholic Primary School
- HKSYC & IA San Wui Commercial Society School
- Hoi Ping Chamber of Commerce Primary School
- Ka Ling School of the Precious Blood
- Kowloon Junior School - an English Schools Foundation school (for P4 through P6 pupils)
- Kowloon Rhenish School
- Laichikok Catholic Primary School
- Li Cheng Uk Government Primary School
  - In 1994 it had significant numbers of students with origins from India and the Philippines.
- Lingnan University Alumni Association (HK) Primary School
- Maryknoll Fathers' School (Primary Section)
- Mental Health Association of Hong Kong - Cornwall School - special-needs school for intellectual disability
- Pak Tin Catholic Primary School
- Po Leung Kuk Choi Kai Yau School
- Saviour Lutheran School - special-needs school for intellectual disability
- Sham Shui Po Government Primary School
- Sham Shui Po Kaifong Welfare Association Primary School
- Sheng Kung Hui Kei Fook Primary School
- Sheng Kung Hui Kei Oi Primary School
- Sheng Kung Hui St. Andrew's Primary School
- Sheng Kung Hui St. Clement's Primary School
- Sheng Kung Hui St. Thomas' Primary School
- Society of Boys' Centres Chak Yan Centre School - school for social development
- St. Francis of Assisi's Caritas School
- St. Francis of Assisi's English Primary School
- St. Margaret's Co-educational English Secondary and Primary School
- Tack Ching Primary School
- Tak Nga Primary School
- Tsung Tsin Primary School And Kindergarten
- Tung Wah Group of Hospitals Kwan Fong Kai Chi School - special-needs school for intellectual disability
- Ying Wa Primary School

=== Southern District ===
Primary schools in Southern District:

- Aberdeen St. Peter's Catholic Primary School
- Aplichau Kaifong Primary School
- Canadian International School of Hong Kong
- Ebenezer New Hope School - special-needs school for visual impairment
- Ebenezer School - special-needs school for visual impairment
- Hong Kong International School
- Hong Kong Red Cross John F. Kennedy Centre- special-needs school for physical disability
- Hong Kong Southern District Government Primary School
- Independent Schools Foundation Academy
- Kellett School
- Kennedy School (English Schools Foundation)
- Marycove School - school for social development
- Precious Blood Primary School (South Horizons)
- Precious Blood Primary School (Wah Fu Estate)
- Pui Tak Canossian Primary School
- Sheng Kung Hui Chi Fu Chi Nam Primary School
- Sheng Kung Hui Tin Wan Chi Nam Primary School
- Singapore International School
- South Island School
- St. Paul's Co-educational College Primary School
- St. Peter's Catholic Primary School
- St. Stephen's College Preparatory School
- St. Teresa's School
- Tung Wah Group of Hospitals Hok Shan School
- Tung Wah Group of Hospitals Tsui Tsin Tong School - special-needs school for intellectual disability
- Victoria Shanghai Academy
- Mulberry House International Kindergarten (Southside)

=== Tai Po District ===
Primary schools in Tai Po District:

- Hong Chi Pinehill School - special-needs school for intellectual disability
- Hong Chi Pinehill No.2 School - special-needs school for intellectual disability
- Hong Chi Pinehill No.3 School - special-needs school for intellectual disability
- Hong Kong and Kowloon Kaifong Women's Association Sun Fong Chung Primary School
- Hong Kong Taoist Association Wun Tsuen Ng Lai Wo Memorial School
- Hong Lok Yuen International School
- Japanese International School
- Lam Tsuen Public Wong Fook Luen Memorial School
- Norwegian International School
- NTW & JWA Leung Sing Tak Primary School
- Po Leung Kuk Tin Ka Ping Millennium Primary School
- Po Leung Kuk Tin Ka Ping Primary School
- Sacred Heart of Mary Catholic Primary School
- Sam Shui Natives Association Huen King Wing School
- Sheng Kung Hui Yuen Chen Maun Chen Jubilee Primary School
- Sheng Kung Hui Yuen Chen Maun Chen Primary School
- Spastics Association Hong Kong Jockey Club Elaine Field School - special-needs school for physical disability
- Sung Tak School
- Sung Tak Wong Kin Sheung Memorial School
- Tai Po Baptist Public School
- Tai Po Government Primary School
- Tai Po Methodist School
- Tai Po Old Market Public School
- Tai Po Old Market Public School (Plover Cove)
- The Education University of Hong Kong Jockey Club Primary School
- Yan Chai Hospital Choi Hin To Primary School
- Mulberry House International Kindergarten (Tai Po)

=== Tsuen Wan District ===
Primary schools in Tsuen Wan District:

- CCC Chuen Yuen First Primary School
- CCC Kei Wai Primary School
- CCC Kei Wai Primary School (Ma Wan)
- Chai Wan Kok Catholic Primary School
- Emmanuel Primary School
- Ho Shun Primary School (Sponsored by Sik Sik Yuen)
- Hoi Pa Street Government Primary School
- Holy Cross Lutheran School
- Hong Kong Baptist Convention Primary School
- Hong Kong Taoist Association the Yuen Yuen Institute Shek Wai Kok Primary School
- Kwai-ming Wu Memorial School of Precious Blood
- Lei Muk Shue Catholic Primary School
- Mary of Providence Primary School
- Rosebud Primary School
- Shak Chung Shan Memorial Catholic Primary School
- Sham Tseng Catholic Primary School
- Sheng Kung Hui Chu Oi Primary School (Lei Muk Shue)
- Si Yuan School of the Precious Blood
- Tsuen Wan Catholic Primary School
- Tsuen Wan Chiu Chow Public School
- Tsuen Wan Government Primary School
- Tsuen Wan Public Ho Chuen Yiu Memorial Primary School

=== Tuen Mun District ===
Primary schools in Tuen Mun District:

- AD & FD POHL Mrs. Cheng Yam On Millennium School
- AD & FD POHL Mrs. Cheng Yam On School
- Buddhist Lau Tin Sang Primary School
- Castle Peak Catholic Primary School
- CCC But San Primary School
- CCC Hoh Fuk Tong Primary School
- CCC Mong Wong Far Yok Memorial Primary School
- FDBWA Chow Chin Yau School
- Harrow International School Hong Kong
- Hing Tak School
- HKRSS Tuen Mun Primary School
- Hong Chi Morninghill School, Tuen Mun - special-needs school for intellectual disability
- Hong Chi Morninghope School, Tuen Mun - special-needs school for intellectual disability
- Hong Chi Morninglight School, Tuen Mun - special-needs school for intellectual disability
- Hong Kong Christian Service Pui Oi School - special-needs school for physical disability
- Hong Kong Eng Clansman Association Wu Si Chong Memorial School
- Hong Kong Red Swastika Society Tuen Mun Primary School
- Islamic Primary School
- Lok Sin Tong Leung Wong Wai Fong Memorial School
- Lui Cheung Kwong Lutheran Primary School
- Lung Kong WFSL Lau Tak Yung Memorial Primary School
- Lutheran Tsang Shing Siu Leun School
- Po Leung Kuk Fong Wong Kam Chuen Primary School
- Po Leung Kuk Hong Kong Taoist Association Yuen Yuen Primary School
- Po Leung Kuk Horizon East Primary School
- Po Leung Kuk Leung Chow Shun Kam Primary School
- Po Leung Kuk Vicwood KT Chong No.2 Primary School
- R. T. C. Gaia School
- Sheng Kung Hui Mung Yan Primary School
- Shun Tak Fraternal Association Ho Yat Tung Primary School
- Shun Tak Fraternal Association Lee Kam Primary School
- Shun Tak Fraternal Association Wu Siu Kui Memorial Primary School
- SRBCEPSA Ho Sau Ki School
- Taoist Ching Chung Primary School
- Taoist Ching Chung Primary School (Wu King Estate)
- Toi Shan Association Primary School
- Tuen Mun Government Primary School
- Tung Wah Group of Hospitals Tang Shiu Kin Primary School
- Yan Chai Hospital Ho Sik Nam Primary School
- Yan Chai Hospital Law Chan Chor Si Primary School
- Yan Oi Tong Madam Lau Wong Fat Primary School
- Yan Tak Catholic Primary School

=== Wan Chai District ===
Primary schools in Wan Chai District:

- Autism Partnership School - a private special-needs school
- Bradbury School - an English Schools Foundation school
- Buddhist Wong Cheuk Um Primary School
- Hennessy Road Government Primary School
- Hong Chi Lions Morninghill School - special-needs school for intellectual disability
- Hong Kong Japanese School Primary Section
- Jockey Club Hong Chi School - special-needs school for intellectual disability
- Li Sing Tai Hang School
- Lingnan Primary School and Kindergarten
- le Lycée français international
- Marymount Primary School
- Po Kok Primary School
- Po Leung Kuk Gold and Silver Exchange Society Pershing Tsang School
- Precious Blood Primary School
- Pun U Association Wah Yan Primary School
- Raimondi College Primary Section
- Sheng Kung Hui St. James' Primary School
- Sir Ellis Kadoorie (Sookunpo) Primary School
- St. Francis' Canossian School
- St. Joseph's Primary School
- St. Paul's Convent School (Primary Section)
- St. Paul's Primary Catholic School
- Starters School
- True Light Middle School of Hong Kong (Primary Section)
- Tung Wah Group of Hospitals Li Chi Ho Primary School

=== Wong Tai Sin District ===
Primary schools in Wong Tai Sin District:

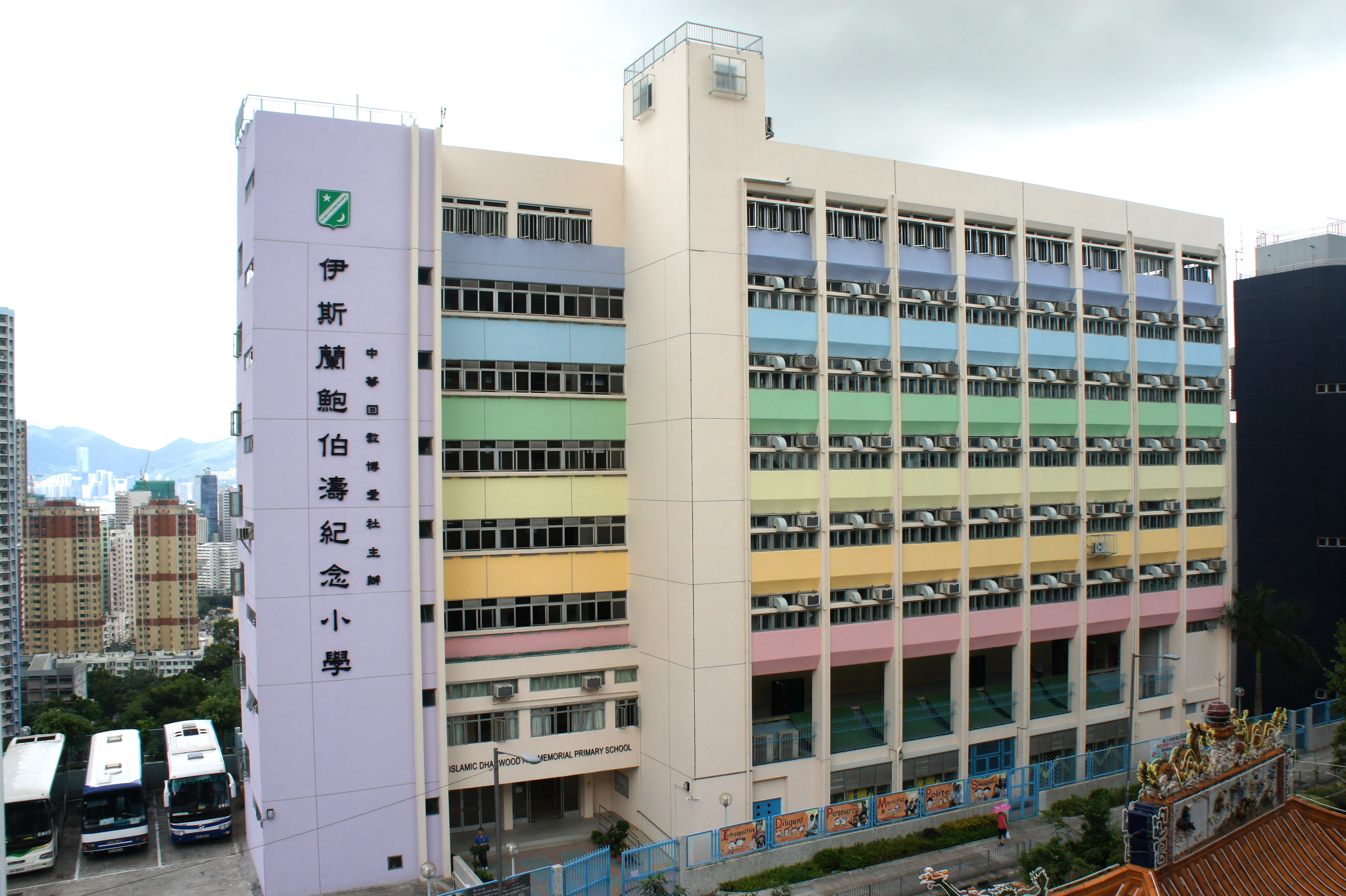
Islamic Dharwood Pau Memorial Primary School

- Baptist Rainbow Primary School
- Bishop Ford Memorial School
- Bishop Walsh Primary School
- Canossa Primary School
- Canossa Primary School (San Po Kong)
- Caritas Pelletier School - school for social development
- CCC Kei Tsz Primary School
- CCC Kei Wa Primary School
- Choi Wan St. Joseph's Primary School
- Chun Tok School
- Confucian Tai Shing Primary School
- Good Hope Primary School cum Kindergarten
- Ho Lap Primary School (Sponsored by Sik Sik Yuen)
- Hong Kong Red Cross Margaret Trench School - special-needs school for physical disability
- International Christian Quality Music Secondary and Primary School
- Islamic Dharwood Pau Memorial Primary School
- Ng Wah Catholic Primary School
- Our Lady's Primary School
- Po Leung Kuk Centenary School - special-needs school for intellectual disability
- Po Leung Kuk Grandmont Primary School
- Po Leung Kuk Mrs. Chan Nam Chong Memorial Primary School
- Po Leung Kuk Stanley Ho Sau Nan Primary School
- Po Yan Catholic Primary School
- Price Memorial Catholic Primary School
- Rhenish Church Grace School - special-needs school for intellectual disability
- Sheng Kung Hui Ching Shan Primary School
- Sheng Kung Hui Kei Tak Primary School
- Sheng Kung Hui Yat Sau Primary School
- St. Bonaventure Catholic Primary School
- St. Patrick's Catholic Primary School (Po Kong Village Road)
- St. Patrick's School
- Tsz Wan Shan Catholic Primary School
- Tsz Wan Shan St. Bonaventure Catholic Primary School
- Wong Tai Sin Catholic Primary School
- Wong Tai Sin Government Primary School

=== Yau Tsim Mong District ===
Primary schools in Yau Tsim Mong District:

- Canton Road Government Primary School
- CCC Heep Woh Primary School
- CCC Kei Tsun Primary School
- CCC Mongkok Church Kai Oi School
- CCC Wanchai Church Kei To Primary School
- Dalton School Hong Kong
- Diocesan Girls' Junior School
- Fresh Fish Traders' School
- G. T. (Ellen Yeung) College (Mong Kok Chi Kit Campus)
- Jordan Road Government Primary School
- Kowloon Women's Welfare Club Li Ping Memorial School
- Methodist School
- Po Leung Kuk Camões Tan Siu Lin Primary School
- Sharon Lutheran School
- Sheng Kung Hui Kei Wing Primary School
- St. Mary's Canossian School
- Tai Kok Tsui Catholic Primary School
- Tai Kok Tsui Catholic Primary School (Hoi Fan Road)
- Tak Sun School
- Tong Mei Road Government Primary School
- Tung Koon District Society Fong Shu Chuen School
- Tung Wah Group of Hospitals Lo Yu Chik Primary School
- Yaumati Catholic Primary School
- Yaumati Catholic Primary School (Hoi Wang Road)
- Yaumati Kaifong Association School

=== Yuen Long District ===
Primary schools in Yuen Long District:

- AD & FD POHL Leung Sing Tak School
- Buddhist Chan Wing Kan Memorial School
- Buddhist TCFS Yeung Yat Lam Memorial School - special-needs school for intellectual disability
- Buddhist Wing Yan School
- Caritas Lok Kan School - special-needs school for intellectual disability
- CCC Chun Kwong Primary School
- Chinese YMCA Primary School
- Chiu Yang Por Yen Primary School
- Chiu Yang Primary School of Hong Kong
- Christian and Missionary Alliance Chui Chak Lam Memorial School
- Christian Alliance S. Y. Yeh Memorial Primary School
- Chung Sing School
- Cumberland Presbyterian Church Yao Dao Primary School
- Gigamind English Primary School
- Ho Ming Primary School (Sponsored by Sik Sik Yuen)
- Hong Chi Morningjoy School, Yuen Long - special-needs school for intellectual disability
- Hong Chi Morninglight School, Yuen Long - special-needs school for intellectual disability
- Hong Kong and Macau Lutheran Church Wong Chan Sook Ying Memorial School
- HKFYG Lee Shau Kee Primary School
- Hong Kong Student Aid Society Primary School
- Kam Tin Mung Yeung Public School
- Kwong Ming School
- Kwong Ming Ying Loi School
- Lions Clubs International Ho Tak Sum Primary School
- Lok Sin Tong Leung Kau Kui Primary School
- Lok Sin Tong Leung Kau Kui Primary School (Branch)
- Pat Heung Central Primary School
- Po Kok Branch School
- Po Leung Kuk Law's Foundation school - special-needs school for intellectual disability
- QES Old Students' Association Branch Primary School
- QES Old Students' Association Primary School
- Shap Pat Heung Rural Committee Kung Yik She Primary School
- Sheng Kung Hui Kam Tin St. Joseph's Primary School
- Sheng Kung Hui Ling Oi Primary School
- Sheng Kung Hui Tin Shui Wai Ling Oi Primary School
- Shun Tak Fraternal Association Wu Mien Tuen Primary School
- South Yuen Long Government Primary School
- Tin Shui Wai Catholic Primary School
- Tin Shui Wai Government Primary School
- Tin Shui Wai Methodist Primary School
- Tun Yu School
- Tung Tak School
- Tung Wah Group of Hospitals Leo Tung-hai Lee Primary School
- Tung Wah Group of Hospitals Yiu Dak Chi Memorial Primary School (Yuen Long)
- Umah International Primary School
- W F Joseph Lee Primary School (also known as Wo Foo Foundation Joseph Lee Primary School)
- Xianggang Putonghua Yanxishe Primary School of Science and Creativity
- Yuen Long Government Primary School
- Yuen Long Long Ping Estate Tung Koon Primary School
- Yuen Long Long Ping Estate Wai Chow School
- Yuen Long Merchants Association Primary School
- Yuen Long Public Middle School Alumni Association Primary School
- Yuen Long Public Middle School Alumni Association Ying Yip Primary School

=== Others ===
- Hong Kong Red Cross Hospital Schools - hospital school operating classes at 18 hospitals

== See also ==
- List of English Schools Foundation schools
- List of international schools in Hong Kong
- List of schools in Hong Kong
- List of secondary schools in Hong Kong
- List of special schools in Hong Kong
- List of universities in Hong Kong
