= Guangzhou True Light Middle School =

School in Guangzhou, China

Guangzhou True Light Middle School, or True Light High School, is a school in Shanding. It was founded in 1872 by Harriet Newell Noyes, an American Presbyterian and missionary. It is the mother school of True Light Middle School of Hong Kong and Kowloon True Light Middle School.

== History ==
On June 16, 1872, True Light Academy opened in Shakee. In 1913 it moved to its current location. Communists took over the school in 1949. They reorganized it as a public school. The primary school was named Primary School of Renji Rd. (1951), No. 19 Public Primary school of Central District (1955), First Primary School of Taiping Street (1956), Primary School of Renji Rd. Central District (1958), Primary School of Renji Rd. Yuexiu District (1960), Ruijin Primary School of Yuexiu District (1967) and Primary School of Renji Rd. Yuexiu District (1971). Until 1996, it was finally renamed back as Guangzhou True Light Primary School.

The Middle School combined with New Fashion Private Middle School in 1953 named as Guangzhou Long Beach Middle School. In the same year it was renamed No. 9 Middle School of Guangzhou by using the New Fashion Middle School side, and the Renji Rd. side was renamed No. 3 Middle School of Guangzhou. The New Fashion Private, formerly known as Yinghai Private Middle School in 1947 was founded by Teochew people. In April 1987, the High School was renamed No. 2 Travelling Secondary School of Guangzhou. Until 2000, both were known as the True Light Long Beach Middle School of Guangzhou.

In 1954, the Renji Rd. side was renamed Guangzhou No. 22 Middle School and during 1976 it moved to Hongde Rd., Haizhu District and then back by September 1981. In the interim, the location was used for Guangzhou Foreign Language School.

In 1984, it was named back to Guangzhou True Light Middle School. In 2002 and 2007, The Guangzhou True Light Middle School has rebuilt the connection with the True Light Middle School in Hong Kong.

The schools have been called the Seven Siblings of True Light.

== Notable alumni ==
- Zhang Guangning, former mayor of Guangzhou
- Anna Chennault, prominent female Asian-American politician of the Republican Party
- Su Hua, female artist
- Zheng Ruyong, female scholar

== See also ==
- Hong Kong True Light College
- Kowloon True Light Middle School
- True Light Girls' College
- Hong Kong True Light College
- Harriet Newell Noyes
