= Yau Tsit Law =

Chinese Christian educator

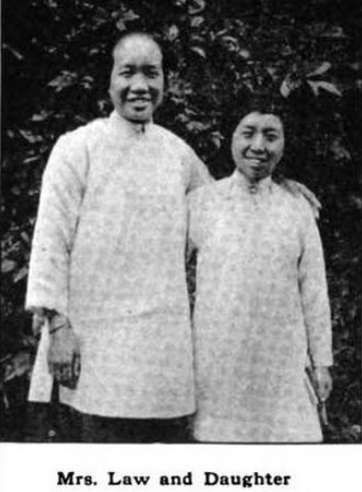
Yau Tsit Law and her mother, Mrs. Law, in 1916.

Yau Tsit Law (1888-1961) was a Chinese Christian educator, and one of the first Chinese women to graduate from Mount Holyoke College.

== Early life and education ==
Yau Tsit Law attended the True Light Seminary in Canton, where her mother was the principal. In 1912 she traveled to the United States for college, one of the first women sent by the Chinese government for an American college education. She graduated from Mount Holyoke College in 1916, and pursued graduate studies at Columbia University.

== Career ==
After she returned to China, Yau Tsit Law taught and was principal of the True Light Middle School of Hong Kong. Beyond school work, she was the general secretary of the YWCA in Guangzhou. In that capacity, she attended the first Institute of Pacific Relations conference in July 1925, held in Honolulu, Hawaii. She gave a talk there, on "Canton Women in Business and the Professions". In 1927 she was appointed dean of women at Lingnan University.

Yau Tsit Law was awarded an honorary doctorate by Mount Holyoke College in 1937, at its centennial celebration. One of Law's students at True Light Seminary, Jane Kwong Lee, served as coordinator of the Chinese YWCA in San Francisco, California, from 1935 to 1944.
