= Harriet Newell Noyes =

American Presbyterian educator, writer and missionary

- Born: March 5, 1844; Guilford Township, Ohio, US
- Died: January 16, 1924 (aged 79)
- Employer: Presbyterian Church of the United States
- Known for: missionary who founded a school

Harriet Newell Noyes (March 5, 1844 – January 16, 1924) was an American Presbyterian educator, writer, and missionary for fifty years. She founded the True Light Girls’ College and True Light Middle School, the first women's school in Guangdong Province, China, and is credited with establishing the first generation of professional women of that province.

== Biography ==
Noyes was born on March 5, 1844, in Guilford, Ohio. Her father, Varnum Noyes (1804 - 1888) was a Presbyterian minister. She was her parents sixth child and one of three of the children who were Chinese missionaries. She was named for Harriet Newell who was a famous missionary.

In January 1868, the Presbyterian Church of the United States (PCUSA) sent her as a missionary to Fangcun, Guangzhou, China (广州市芳村区) where she learned to speak fluent Cantonese. On June 16, 1872, she founded the first school for women in Guangdong Province – the True Light Academy in Shakee. She had spent two years preparing to open the school and she used $1000 she had collected. Noyes was surprised to find the resistance there was to the education of women in the area. She had sufficient resources to supply free education to thirty females and ten of these would be married. When the school first opened, there were only six students and three of them were married. The school that she started was a primary school, but it grew from offering three years of education to offering nine despite having an early disastrous fire. The school broke the 100-student barrier in 1887 and in 1894 had 200 students. The Women's School and the Bible Women's School were moved to Paak Hok Tong, Guangzhou and were merged and renamed as "True Light Middle School". Dr. J.W. Creighton was named the principal. In 1919, the first graduation ceremony was held.

In 1919, Noyes published A Light in the Land of Sinim: Forty-Five Years in the True Light Seminary, 1872–1917.

Noyes returned to the United States in May 1923 when she received a letter from Eugene Chen, the secretary to Sun Yat-sen, thanking her for helping with the education of 6,000 pupils at the "True Light" Seminary.

== Legacy ==
She is credited with establishing the first generation of professional women of that province. Women who were educated during her 50 years at the school went on to become 286 teachers, 114 doctors, and more than 30 nurses. Her book, titled History of the South China Mission of the American Presbyterian Church, 1845–1920, was published posthumously in 1927.

In 1949, the Chinese Communist Revolution forced the headmistress of Noyes' school to move the school to Hong Kong. The school became the Kowloon True Light Middle School. The "True Light" schools also include the Hong Kong True Light College, True Light Girls' College, and True Light Middle School of Hong Kong.

The school that remained in Bai He Dong was taken over by the Chinese Communist Party, which renamed it the Number 22 Middle School during the Cultural Revolution. As of 2012, the school is called the Guangzhou True Light Middle School and Harriet Newell Noyes is credited as its founder.
