= Po Leung Kuk Camões Tan Siu Lin Primary School =

- 保良局陳守仁小學
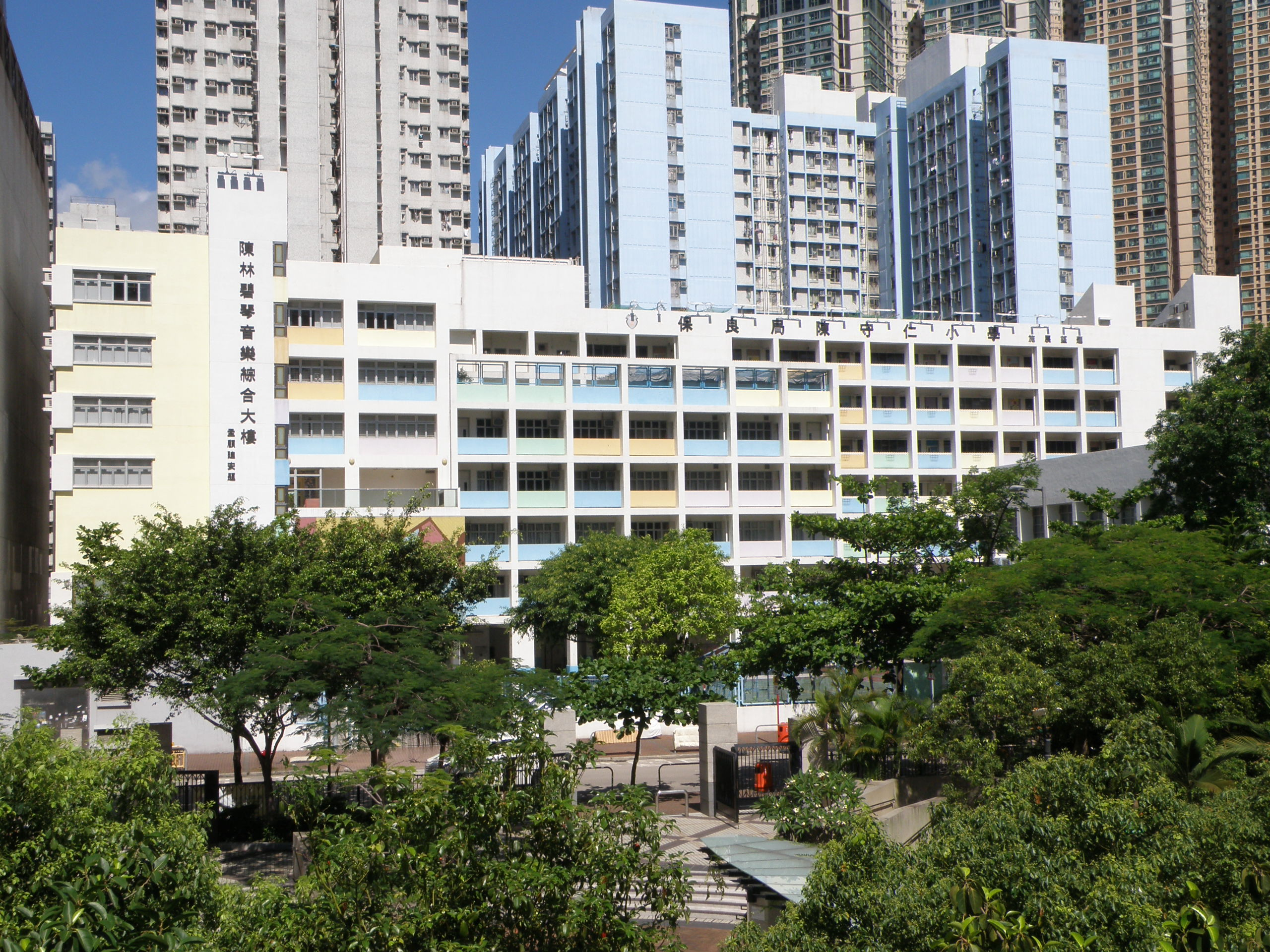

Location
- 6 Hoi Ting Road, Yau Ma Tei, Kowloon; Hong Kong
- Coordinates: 22°18′55.28″N 114°9′55.15″E

Information
- Type: Co-ed DSS
- Established: September 1999; 26 years ago
- Founder: Tan Siu Lin
- School district: Yau Tsim Mong District
- Principal: Raymond C.M Chou, previously Mr. Derek V.M. Yeung
- Staff: 107
- Grades: 1-6
- Enrollment: 8,100 applicants (as of September, 2017)
- Classes: 30 classes
- Average class size: 29 students
- Campus type: Primary school
- Color: Red
- Team name: N.A.
- Newspaper: Camões Flash
- Website: www.plkctslps.edu.hk/en/

Po Leung Kuk Camões Tan Siu Lin Primary School is a DSS primary school in Hong Kong, previously known as "Portuguese Community Schools, Inc., Escola Camões", in Kowloon, Hong Kong. The school has over 800 students from 18 countries.

== History ==
The school was established in the 1950s by the Portuguese Community Education and Welfare Foundation Incorporated located in 7 Cox Road, Jordan. Since 1996, the school has been run by Po Leung Kuk. In the school year 1999, the school moved to a new school premise in Yau Ma Tei. The school was founded with a donation of HKD$ 3,330,000 from Dr. Tan Siu-lin. Because of this, the school was known as "Po Leung Kuk Camões Tan Siu Lin Primary School". The school became a pioneer Direct Subsidy Scheme primary school in Hong Kong in the school year 2000. In the school year 2017–2018, it broke the Hong Kong record of Primary One application by having 8,100 applications.

== Curriculum ==
English is the medium of instruction. Everything is taught in English other than the subjects of Chinese and Putonghua. Subjects include:

- Mathematics
- General Studies
- Primary Humanities
- Primary Science
- Visual Arts
- Music
- Oral Skills (for primary three to six students only)
- Physical Education
- Third Language (Basic French, Basic Spanish and Basic Japanese, students are required to choose one)
- Chinese (Putonghua and Cantonese as the medium of instruction) Classes mostly in Cantonese.
- Computer Studies (replaced by Final Year Project for primary six students)
- English
- Reading and Storytelling (for primary one to two students only)

Despite having many students from foreign countries, all students are required to learn Chinese and Putonghua regardless of whether they speak the language.

== Extra-curricular activities ==
The school offers a variety of extracurricular activities, including:

- Music classes and school teams including Symphony Orchestra, Chinese Orchestra, School Choir, String Camerata, Handchime Ensemble, Recorder Ensemble and individual instruments
- Sporting activities and school teams such as swimming, cricket, table-tennis, basketball, Latin dance, badminton, football, volleyball, tennis, fencing, athletics and triathlon
- Visual arts - handicrafts, ceramics, Chinese painting, printmaking and watercolour painting
- Accelerated and remedial classes for Chinese, English and Maths
- Others - Camões TV team, Astronomy Club, Cubs and Brownies, Poem Recitation, French Drama, Cookery, Magic, Chinese Dance, Science Club

== Annual events ==
Special events include the Annual Concert, Sports Day, Open Day, Chinese Week, English Week, 3rd Language Week (Japanese Week, French Week and Spanish Week), STEAM Week, Thanksgiving 360°, Christmas Party and Post Exam activities. At the latter, students can choose to wear casual clothing.

== School facilities ==
The school has 60+ classrooms in the main building and more than 60 new classrooms in the new annex for different learning use. Other facilities include:

- Covered playgrounds (4 in total)
- Open playground
- Reading corner
- Indoor and outdoor sport climbing walls
- School hall
- Music rooms, piano rooms, drum rooms, rehearsal room, orchestra practice rooms
- Theatre (250+ seats)
- Common room
- Conference room
- Art rooms (2)
- Camões TV studio
- Computer room
- MMLC (Multi-Media Learning Centre)
- Language Kingdom (different rooms include: English, French, Spanish, Japanese and Chinese)
- Astro Base
- Green podium
- Environmental resources centre
- Heart Space
- TAB (Take a break) Room
- Library
- Camões Kitchen
- Organic garden
- Solar power plant
- Tuck shop
- All-weather indoor Swimming Pool

== Achievements ==
2014–2015

- 66th Hong Kong Schools' Speech Festival
  - Champion of English Choral Speaking (Senior)
  - 20 Champions in Solo Verse Speaking
- Outstanding Gold Group Award in True Light Girls' College - Primary School English Quest Competition
- 全港十八區小學數學比賽 全場冠軍

2015–2016

- “Certified Organic Farm - Outstanding Management Award 2016” by Hong Kong Organic Resource Centre Certification Ltd.

2016–2017

- “Certified Organic Farm - Outstanding Management Award 2017” by Hong Kong Organic Resource Centre Certification Ltd.

2017–2018

- “Certified Organic Farm - Outstanding Management Award 2018” by Hong Kong Organic Resource Centre Certification Ltd.

2018–2019

- “Certified Organic Farm - Outstanding Management Award 2019” by Hong Kong Organic Resource Centre Certification Ltd.
- “2019 Think BIG of Learning 100” by Parenting.com.tw

2019–2020

- “Certified Organic Farm - Outstanding Management Award” by Hong Kong Organic Resource Centre Certification Ltd.

2020–2021

- “Certified Organic Farm - Outstanding Management Award” by Hong Kong Organic Resource Centre Certification Ltd.

2021–2022

- “Certified Organic Farm - Outstanding Management Award” by Hong Kong Organic Resource Centre Certification Ltd.
- 11 graduates to SPCC

2022-2023

- "Certified Organic Farm - Best Management Award" by Hong Kong Organic Resource Centre Certification Ltd.
- 8 graduates to SPCC
