= Tai Po Government Primary School =

Primary school in Hong Kong

Coordinates: 22.4530°N 114.1599°E

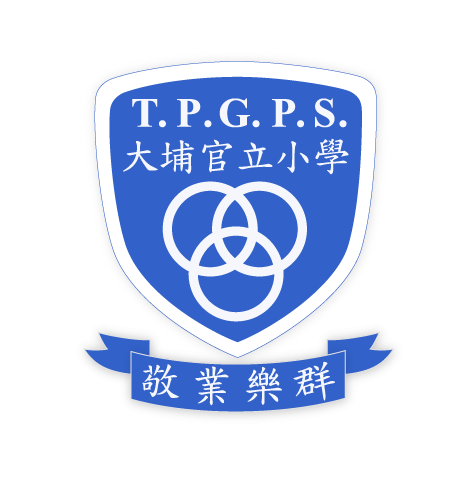
School logo

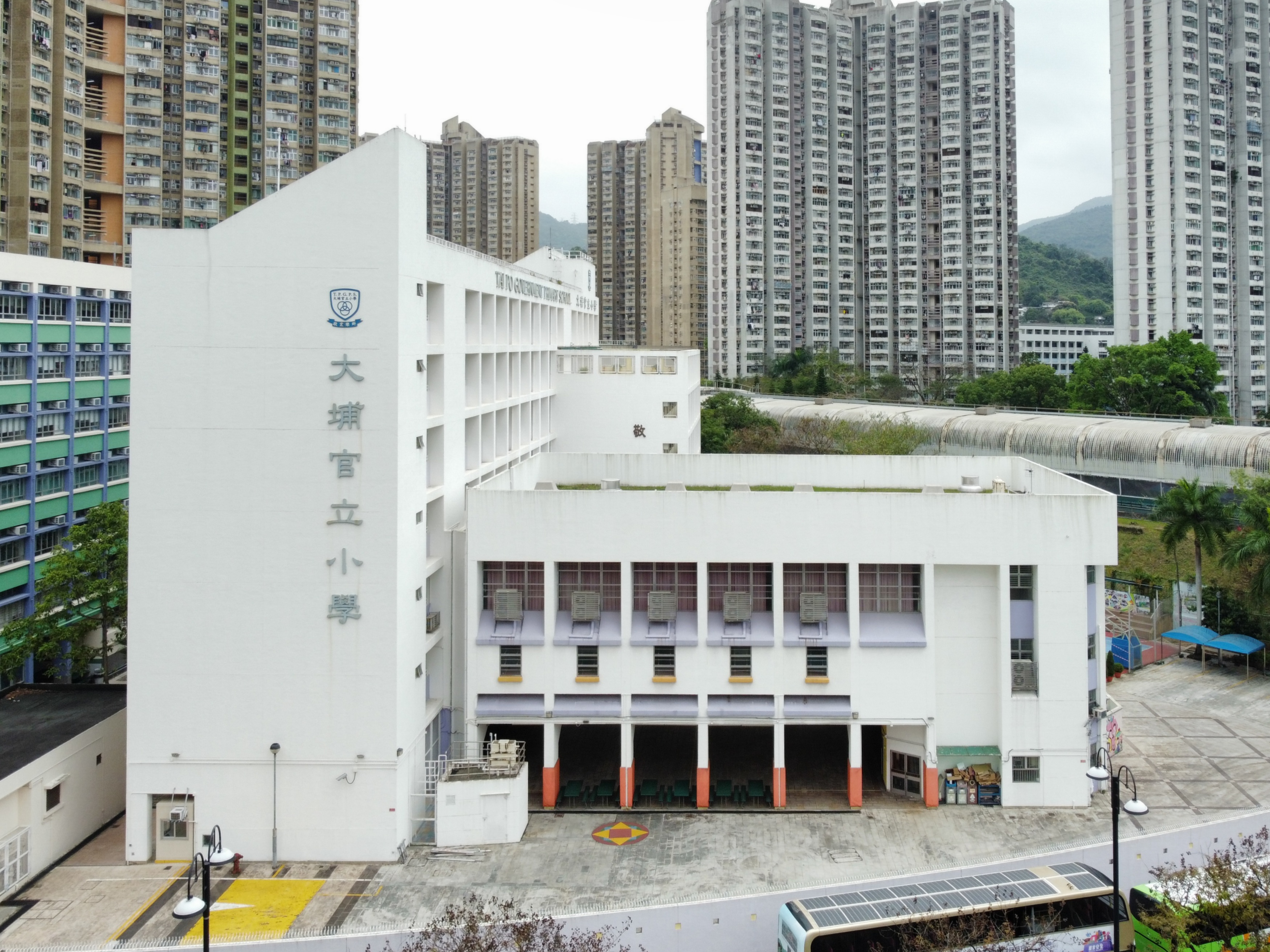
The school in 2023

Tai Po Government Primary School (Chinese: 大埔官立小學) is a co-educational primary school located in Tai Po, Hong Kong.

== History ==
Tai Po Government Primary School was founded in 1946. The school's first location was in a rented two-storey tong lau on Yau Shing Street in Tai Po Market. After it outgrew the campus, the school moved in 1952 to a one-storey building made of granite on Wan Tau Kok Lane on a tiny hill in Tai Po Market. To support more students, it moved to a larger campus at Tai Wo Estate in September 1999 that neighbours Carmel Holy Word Secondary School. Betty Tung, the wife of the Chief Executive of Hong Kong Tung Chee-hwa, spoke at the relocation ceremony.

The school serves students in the school years Primary 1 to Primary 6 and uses Cantonese as the language of instruction. By 2000, it had 30 classes and had moved from a half-day instruction to a full-day instruction.

The school's parent-teacher association (PTA) was founded in the 1950s. The PTA works with the school to put on classes that parents and their children can attend together including English, computer, martial arts, and ballet.

== Notable alumni ==
- Margaret Ng, politician and barrister

== See also ==
- List of primary schools in Hong Kong
