= HKUGA Primary School =

Coordinates: 22.2656°N 114.2395°E

- 港大同學會小學

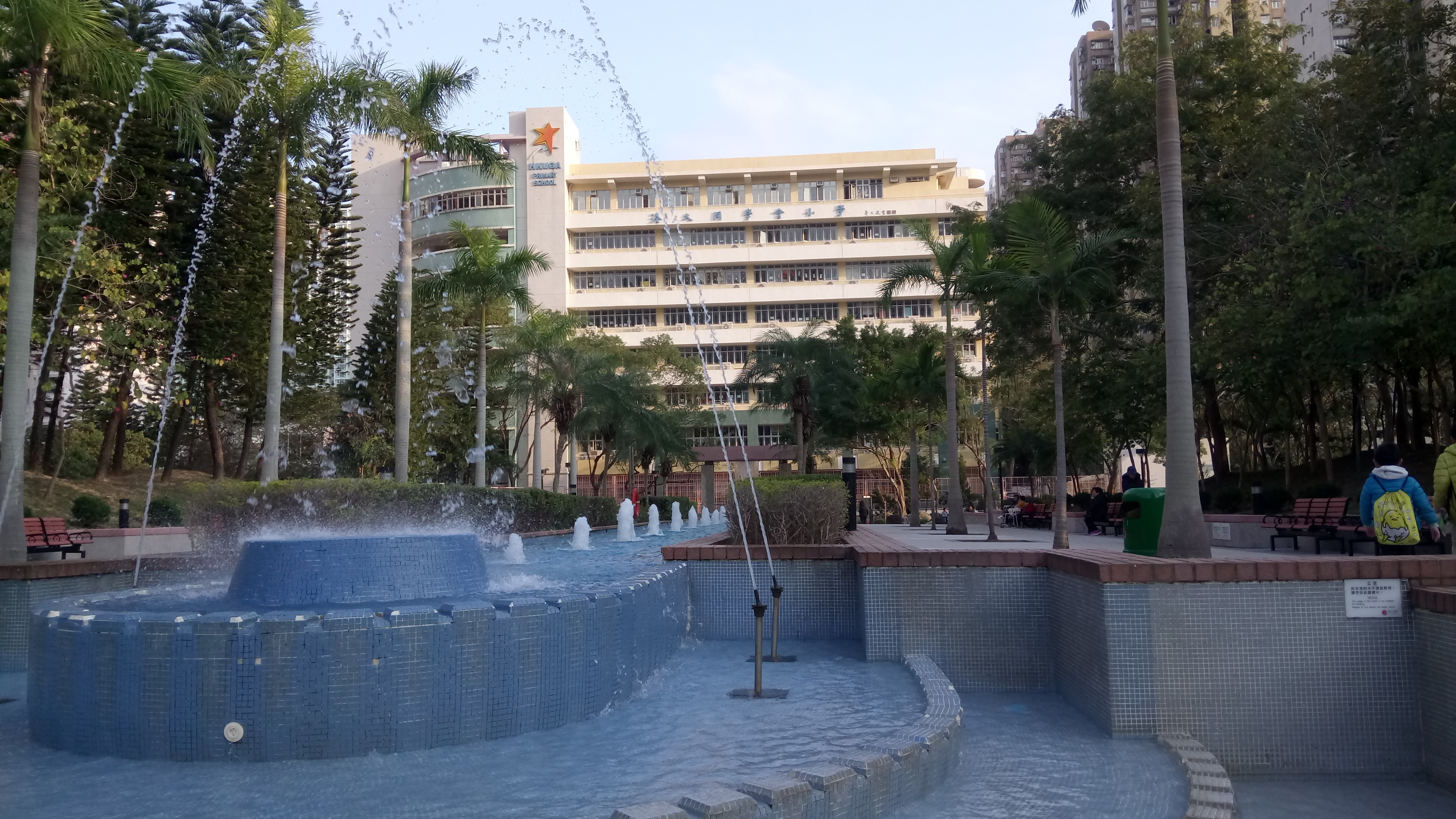
- No. 9 Yee Shing Street, Chai Wan, Hong Kong

Information
- School type: DSS, Primary school
- Motto: Strive for Virtue, Quest for Truth (明德惟志 格物惟勤)
- Established: September 2002; 23 years ago
- Founder: HKUGA Education Foundation
- School district: Eastern District
- Principal: 黃桂鈴
- Grades: Grade 1 - Grade 6
- Enrollment: About 800
- Classes: 24
- Language: Chinese
- Website: www.hkugaps.edu.hk

Chinese name
- Traditional Chinese: 港大同學會小學
- Simplified Chinese: 港大同学会小学
Transcriptions
Standard Mandarin
- Hanyu Pinyin: Gǎng Dà Tóng Xué Huì Xiǎo Xué
Yue: Cantonese
- Jyutping: Gong^{2} Daai^{6} Tung^{4} Hok^{6} Wui^{6} Siu^{2} Hok^{6}

HKUGA Primary School (also called Hong Kong University Graduates Associate Primary School; Chinese: 港大同學會小學) is a private co-educational primary school located at No. 9 Yee Shing Street in Chai Wan, Hong Kong.

== Overview ==
It was founded by the Hong Kong University Graduates Association in 2002. According to the Hong Kong Economic Times, the HKUGA Primary School is "one of the most sought-after DSS schools". Every year, the school receives roughly 6,000 admittance applications for 120 spots. Applicants go through three rounds of interviews. The interviews test group activities, reading, logical questions, conversations, and how familiar parents are with the school.

It is a Direct Subsidy Scheme (DSS) school. It is a through-train school (Chinese: 一條龍學校) in which the primary school students proceed directly to the linked secondary school Hong Kong University Graduate Association College without going through the central allocation process. Author Ian Tsang cautioned parents to consider the considerable distance between the two schools: the primary school was in the Eastern District, while the secondary school was in the Southern District. The school emphasises reading and independent learning. Unlike the typical school which would have teachers teach different subjects, HKUGA Primary School follows the approach of having teachers each teach a single subject. The aim is to have the teachers specialise and become experts in their subject. It follows the biliteracy and trilingualism pedagogical approach in which students are taught how to read in English and Chinese and how to speak in Cantonese, English, and Mandarin. To reduce student stress, the school does not hold exams for students in the first and second grades.

== See also ==
- Education in Hong Kong
- List of primary schools in Hong Kong
