= Ho Chung Chung =

Hong Kong educator (1906–1979)

Ho Chung Chung MBE JP
- 何中中

Principal of True Light Middle School of Hong Kong
- In office 1946–1974

Personal details
- Born: 1906
- Died: 1979 (aged 72–73)
- Occupation: Teacher, headmistress

Ho Chung Chung (Chinese: 何中中; pinyin: Hé Zhōng Zhōng; 1906-1979) was an educator in Hong Kong. She was the principal of the True Light Middle School of Hong Kong from 1946 to 1974. She was awarded an honorary doctorate of humane letters from the Western College for Women, Ohio, in 1959 and an honorary D.Litt. from the University of Hong Kong in 1975. She was appointed MBE in the 1955 New Year Honours.
