= Hong Kong True Light College =

Primary and secondary school for girls in Hong Kong

Hong Kong True Light College Chinese: 香港真光書院

Location
- 1 Lei Tung Estate Road, Ap Lei Chau; Hong Kong
- 22°14′34″N 114°09′30″E

Information
- Type: Secondary school for girls
- Motto: 'Thou art the Light of the world' (Matthew 5:14) (爾乃世之光)
- Established: 1975; 51 years ago
- School district: Hong Kong Island
- President: Kwan Suet Ming
- Principal: Dr. Ng Ka Man
- Affiliation: Protestantism/Christianity
- School type: Aided
- School Size: Around 7711 sq.m
- Sponsoring body: The True Light Middle School of Hong Kong School Management Board
- Website: www.hktlc.edu.hk

Chinese name
- Traditional Chinese: 香港真光書院
- Simplified Chinese: 香港真光书院
Transcriptions
Standard Mandarin
- Hanyu Pinyin: Xiānggǎng Zhēn Guāng Shūyuàn
Yue: Cantonese
- Jyutping: hoeng1 gong2 zan1 gwong1 syu1 jyun6*2

Hong Kong True Light College (HKTLC; Chinese: 香港真光書院) is a Christian girls secondary school in Ap Lei Chau, Hong Kong Island, Hong Kong.

== History ==
Harriet Newell Noyes, an American Christian missionary, founded True Light College in Guangzhou in 1872. Four schools are associated with True Light - Hong Kong True Light College, which were established from 1935 to 1973. In 1975, the Hong Kong True Light College was founded in Caine Road, and was later relocated to Ap Lei Chau in 1995. The Chinese name was also changed in 1999.

== School motto ==
- 'Thou art the light of the world' (爾乃世之光) (Matthew 5:14)

== School badge ==
- Star of Bethlehem

== School ethos ==
- Hong Kong True Light College is marked by the culture of simplicity. It aim at cultivating students' good character and implementing a Christian-based holistic education. In school, students need to wear a blue 'cheong-sam', a traditional costume for Chinese women. Students may wear short hair, plaits or pony-tails.

== School song ==
- 'We sing of a school where we’re happy as can be, of course, we mean Chan Kwong. In our work and in our play, we’re as good as we can be, for the glory of Chan Kwong. In the days that have gone by, there were keepers of the light, good keepers at Chan Kwong. And in the coming time, we too will keep the light, keep it shining for Chan Kwong.

[REFRAIN]For the glory of Chan Kwong we’ll live, for the glory of Chan Kwong. In the days that are to be, we’ll be good as we can be, for the glory of Chan Kwong.'

== Notable alumni ==
- Elanne Kong, Hong Kong actress and singer

== See also ==
- True Light Middle School of Hong Kong
- True Light Girls' College
- Kowloon True Light Middle School
- Education in Hong Kong
- List of secondary schools in Hong Kong
