= St. Francis of Assisi's English Primary School =

Primary school in Hong Kong

St. Francis of Assisi's English Primary School 聖方濟各英文小學
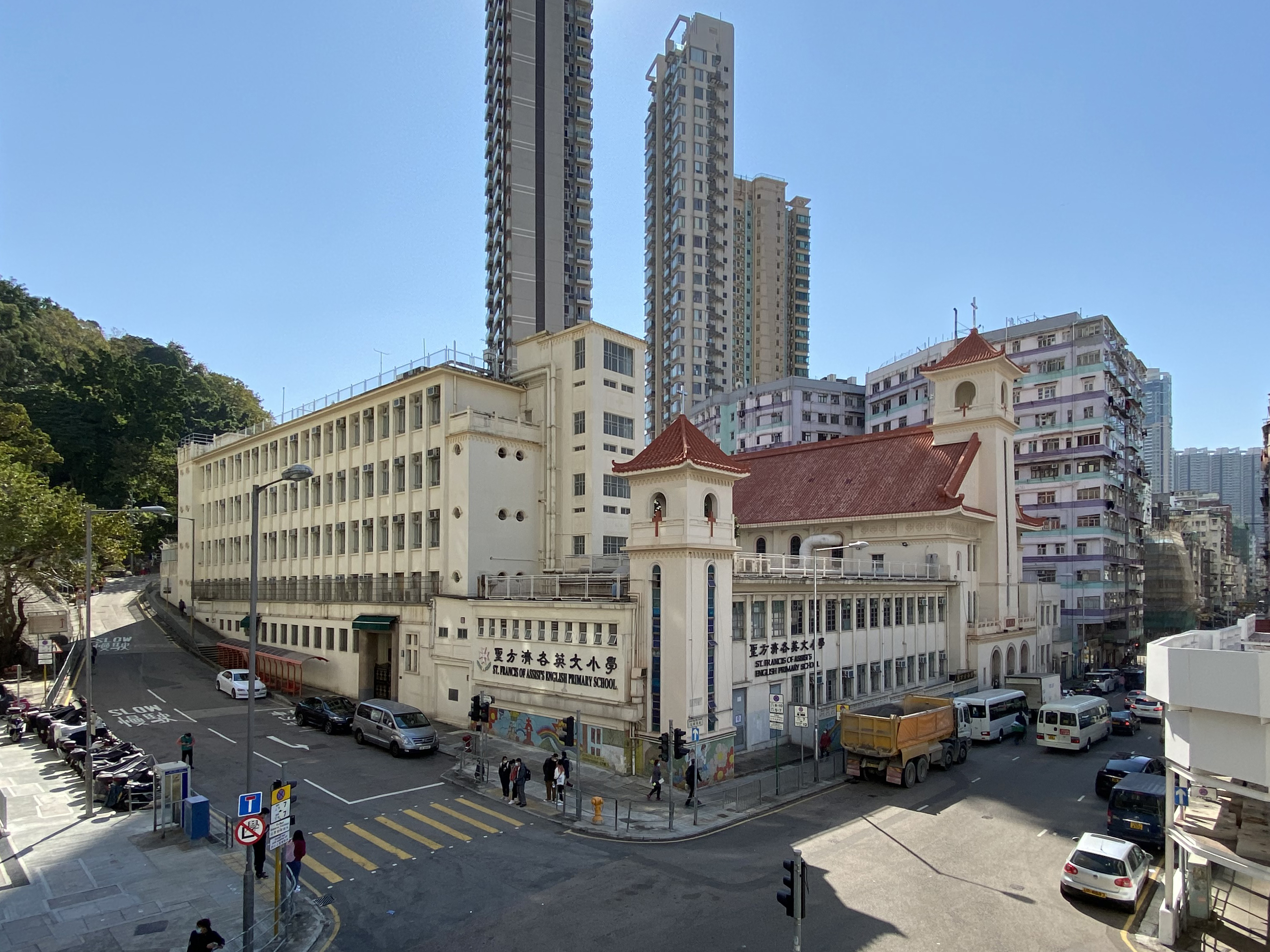

Location
- 58 Shek Kip Mei Street; Sham Shui Po; Kowloon
- Coordinates: 22.330688°N 114.166534°E

Information
- Type: Private Whole Day English Primary School
- Motto: DOMINUS MEUS, DEUS MEUS (MY LORD AND MY GOD)
- Religious affiliation: Catholic
- Established: 1955
- Supervisor: Ting Tak Ching Teresa
- Principal: Tam Ka Ming
- Language: Chinese, English, French, Japanese
- Annual tuition: HK$57,300 (2025)
- Affiliation: Catholic Diocese of Hong Kong
- Website: https://www.sfaeps.edu.hk

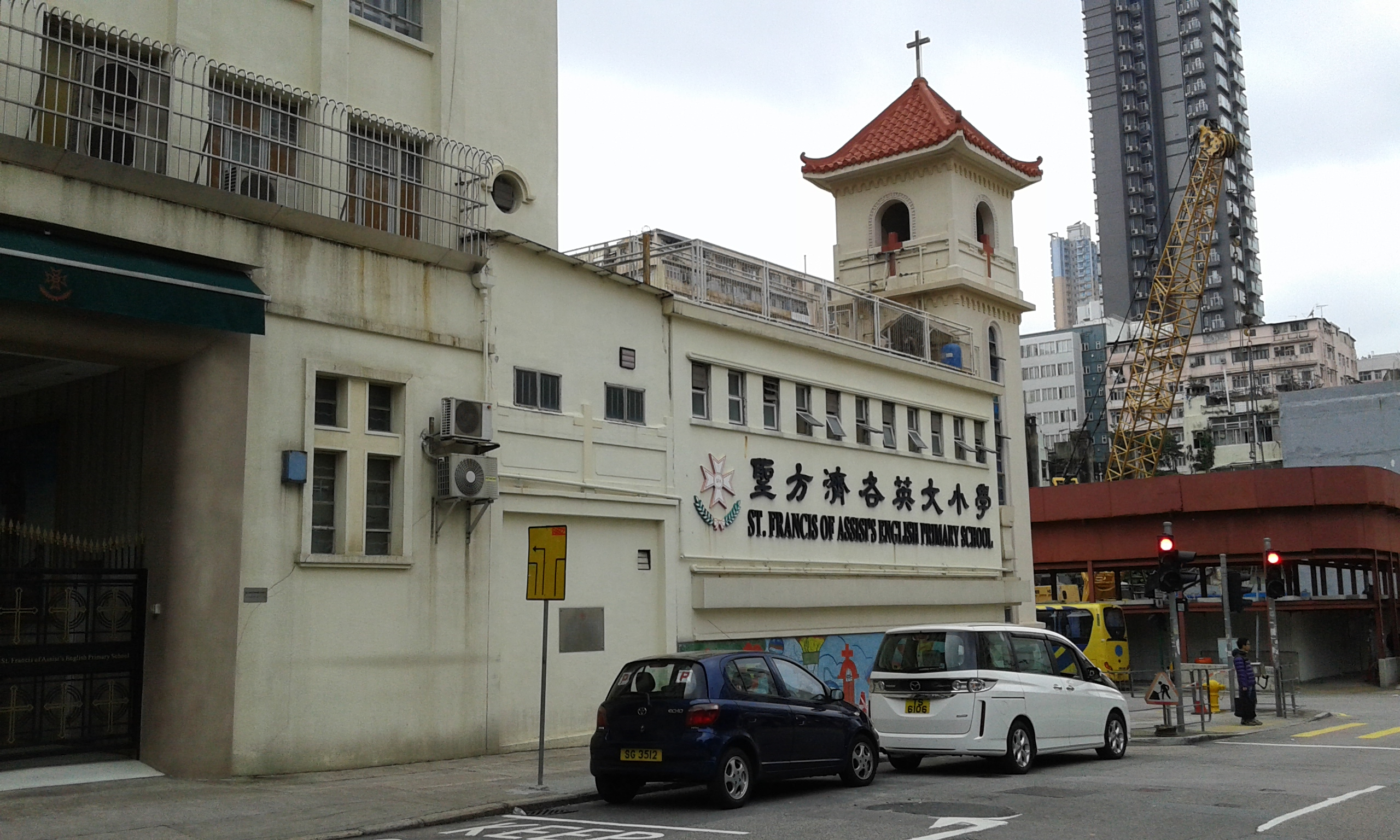
Exterior of the school

St. Francis of Assisi's English Primary School (Chinese: 聖方濟各英文小學) is a private Catholic whole-day English primary school in Sham Shui Po, Kowloon, Hong Kong. The school uses English as the medium of instruction.

== School history ==
St. Francis of Assisi's English Primary School was founded in 1955. At the time, the school was a building with two storeys, including the ground floor of St. Francis of Assisi Church, a school hall, a playground, and twelve classrooms.

A second five-storey school building was built alongside the playground in 1962. The number of classrooms was then increased to 26 and the school was officially named the present school name.

A gifted student programme was created in 1998, admitting only students with IQ above 130 "to help them maximise their high potential".

Whole-day school policy was implemented in 1999.

BYOD (Bring Your Own Device) was implemented in 2012 as part of the school’s development in eLearning.

== Architecture ==
The school's architect was Chien Nai-jen (錢乃仁). The school was built in 1955 as a replacement of a previous church building demolished by the Japanese military for expanding Kai Tak during the Japanese Occupation of Hong Kong. The building was built in the Chinese renaissance architectural style, which was exceptionally rare and the only project by Chien to use this type of architectural style.

== School curriculum ==
All subjects are taught in English except for Chinese, which is taught in Putonghua, and third languages. Students are required to take either French or Japanese from Primary 3 to Primary 6, which they may choose to take the DELF Prim A1.1 if taking French or the Level N5 examination of the Japanese Language Proficiency Test if taking Japanese.

Students from Primary 3 to Primary 6 are required to purchase iPads and electronic books to use during lessons.
