= Kowloon True Light School =

Secondary school in Hong Kong

Coordinates: 22.33837°N 114.17569°E

Kowloon True Light School 九龍真光中學
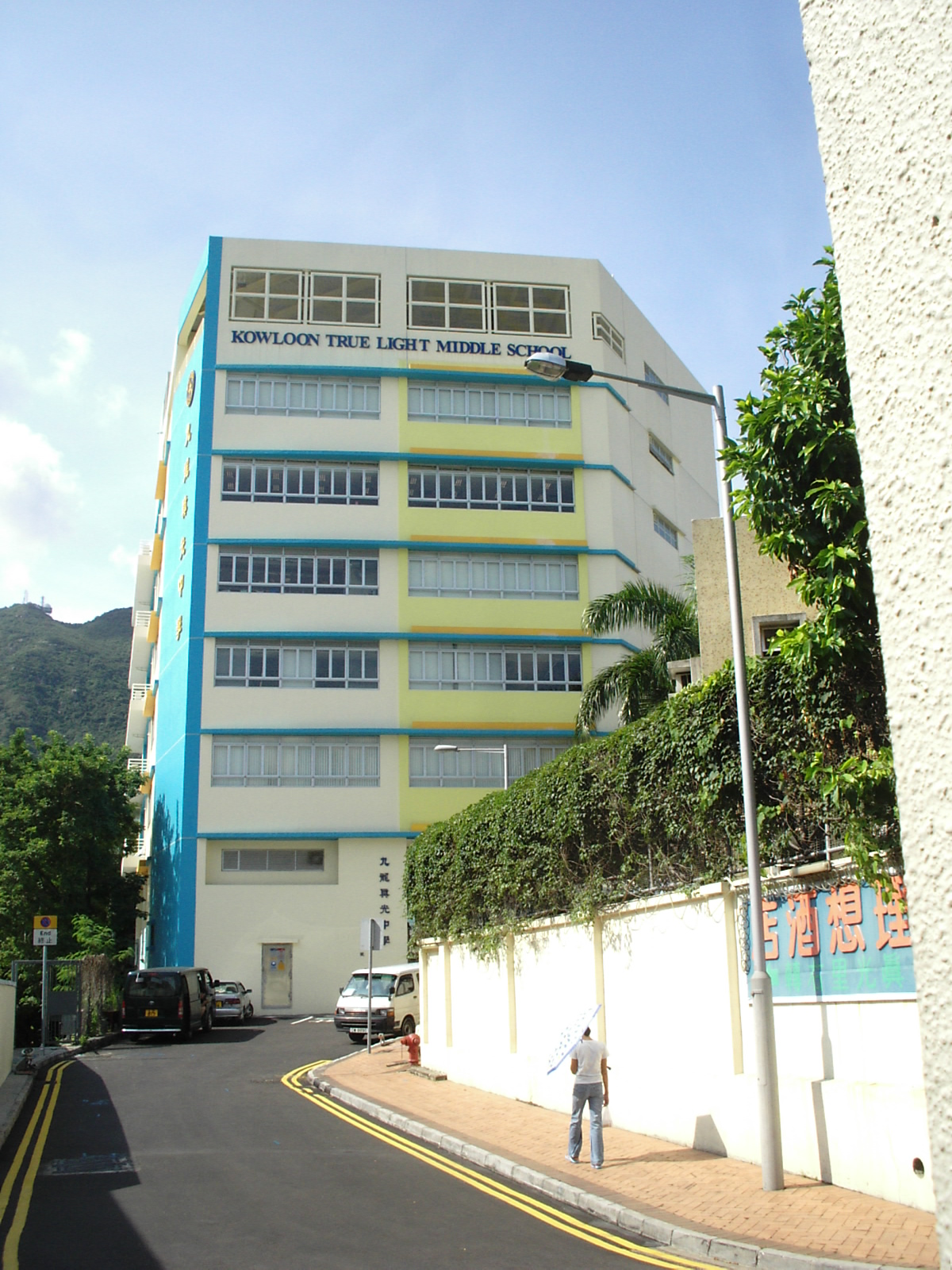
- 1 True Light Lane, Kowloon Tong; Hong Kong

Information
- Type: primary & secondary school for girls
- Motto: 'Thou art the Light of the world' (Matthew 5:14) (爾乃世之光)
- Established: 1949; 77 years ago
- School district: Kowloon
- Affiliation: Protestant
- Website: ktls.edu.hk

Kowloon True Light School
- Traditional Chinese: 九龍真光中學
- Simplified Chinese: 九龙真光中学
- Literal meaning: Kowloon True Light Secondary School
Transcriptions
Standard Mandarin
- Hanyu Pinyin: Jiǔlóng Zhēn Guāng Zhōngxué
Yue: Cantonese
- Jyutping: gau2 lung4 zan1 gwong1 zung1 hok6

Kowloon True Light School (KTLS, Chinese: 九龍真光中學) is a Protestant girls' secondary school, founded in 1945, and situated in Kowloon Tong, Kowloon, Hong Kong. This school is located near Kowloon Tong station.

Like all True Light Middle School in Hong Kong, the predecessor is True Light Seminary, which is the first girl school in South China. Because of the Civil War in 1949, True Light Girl School in Guangzhou moved to Hong Kong and placed on Waterloo Road No.115 (which is Kowloon True Light Primary School for now) and named it as Kowloon True Light Secondary School. It moved to Suffolk Road in 1960.

== History ==
On 16 June 1872, True Light School, a primary school, was founded in Guangzhou by Harriet Newell Noyes, a missionary from the American Presbyterian Church. In 1917, the True Light Middle School was established in Guangzhou as a secondary section.

In 1949, due to the communist takeover of Guangzhou, the school transferred to Hong Kong. It was finally relocated to the current site in 1960, with an affiliated primary school and kindergarten opened on its original campus on Waterloo Road. In 1990, the basketball court was demolished, in order to build a new annex. In addition, a six-story new building was completed in 2006.

== Principals ==
- Ms. Ma Yi Ying (1947–1973)
- Ms. Li Wai Lim (1973–1978)
- Ms. Butt Yee Har (1978–1991)
- Ms. Chan Yuen Sheung (1991–2010)
- Ms. Lee Yi Ying (2010–Present)

== Motto ==
=== School Motto ===
- ”Thou Art the Light of the World” reference from Matthew 5:14.

=== Motto of the year ===
- 2011–2012: Born to love
- 2012–2013: Thanks giving, positive thinking
- 2013–2014: Love giving and logical thinking
- 2014–2015: Embrace uniqueness, uphold collectiveness
- 2015–2016: Thrive and Fly
- 2016–2017: It all begins with respect.
- 2017–2018: Optimism leads to power.
- 2018–2019: Work with assiduity, grow with perseverance
- 2019–2020: Only you
- 2020–2021: MASTER me
- 2021–2022: In your shoes, be your pal.
- 2022–2023 :Where acceptance flows, gratitude can grow.

== Uniform ==
Ever since the establishment, True Light students have always been in light blue Cheongsam and plaits. They can choose to have a ponytail or two plaits since 2011. For PE uniforms, there are four different colours on the shoulder because of the houses. They are Red House, Green House, Purple House and Blue House.

== Form Councils ==
The council began and have kept a 6-year cycle since 1994.

Council Colour	Council Name and Council Song	Council Flower	Council Motto
Blue-white	Ai Wan	Tulip	Work with loyalty and in Unity
Red-white	Yuk Jing	Lotus	Shine like the Sun; Bright as the Moon
Green-white	Hiu	Lily	Know the Truth; control the deeds.
Blue-white	Hang Po	Daisy	Work diligently
Red-white	Sun Fai	Sunflower	Shine through the community.
Green-white	Yiu	Chinese Plum	Cast off the darkness of the world.

== See also ==
- True Light Girls' College
- True Light Middle School of Hong Kong
- Hong Kong True Light College
- Education in Hong Kong
- List of secondary schools in Hong Kong
