= Choi Jun School =

Special school in Hong Kong

Coordinates: 22.3633°N 114.1768°E

- 才俊學校
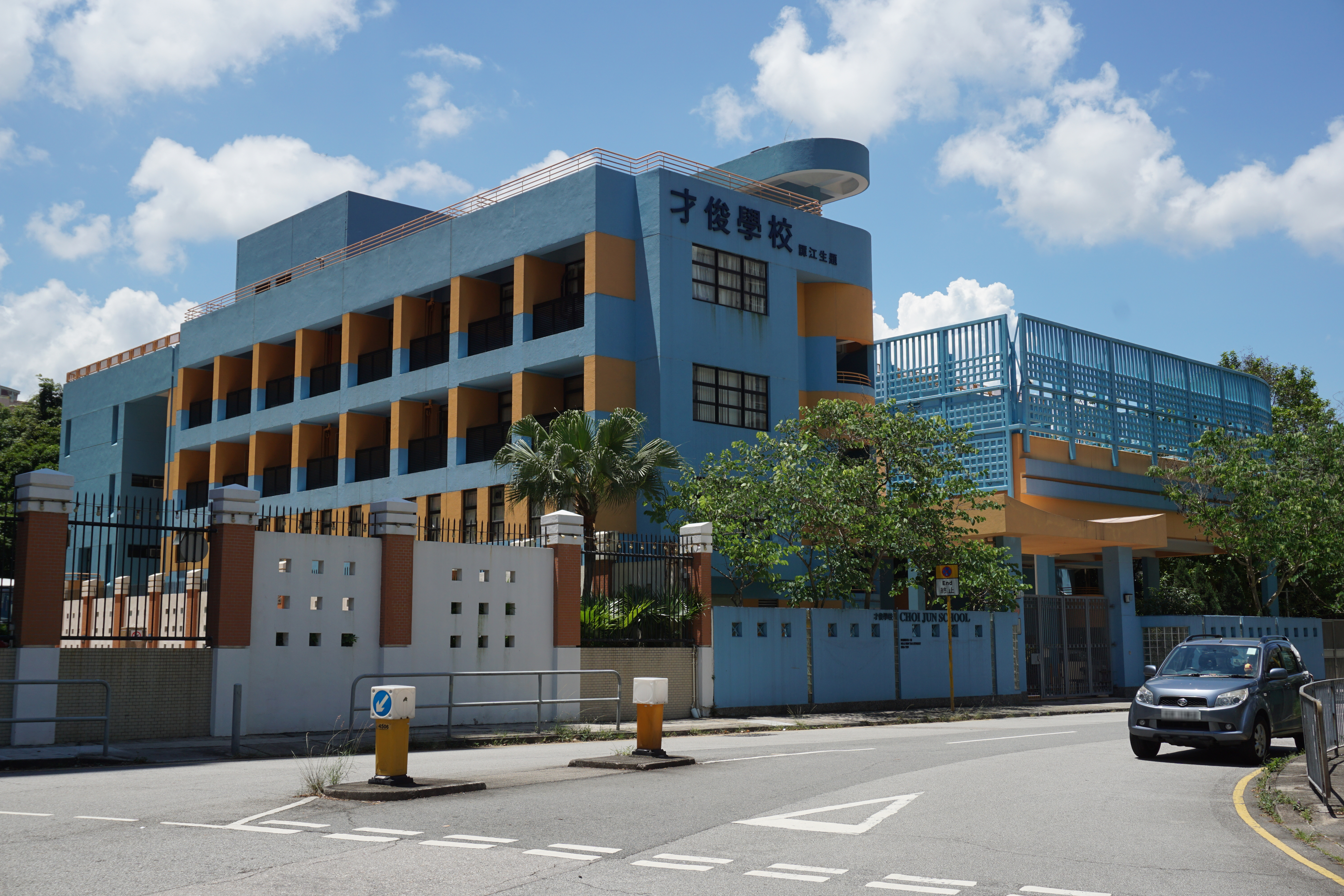

Location
- 2 Hin Tai Street, Tai Wai, Sha Tin District, New Territories, Hong Kong

Information
- Type: Special School
- Motto: 好學力行，立己惠群 (Be diligent in learning and practice, establish yourself and benefit the community)
- Established: 1977
- School district: Sha Tin District
- President: 梁飛農
- Grades: Primary: Grade 1- 6 Secondary: Grade 1- 6
- Enrollment: 206
- Language: Chinese
- Area: 2,200 sqm
- Affiliation: Tsz Wan Shan Kaifong Welfare Association
- Website: https://www.choijun.edu.hk/

Choi Jun School is a special school in Hong Kong, located in Sha Tin District, New Territories.

== History ==
In 1977, the school was founded under the name Cai Zhun School (蔡準學校). The school's school sponsoring group was founded by the Tsz Wan Shan Neighborhood Welfare Association (慈雲山街坊福利會).

The school site was located next to Block 1-3 of Tsz Wan Shan Estate, next to the school building of the former Baptist Pui Oi Primary School connected to Po Leung No. 4 Primary School, sharing the school building with Caritas Lequn School.

In 1993, in order to cooperate with the reconstruction of Tsz On Estate, the school moved from Tsz Wan Shan to a new school building in Tai Wai, and its school name was changed from Cai Chun School (蔡準學校) to Cai Chun School (才俊學校).

In 2022, the school donated face masks to the local community, in a joint project with the Tsz Wan Shan Kaifong Welfare Association.

== School management ==
The school is managed by an incorporated management committee. It has a total of 12 school managers, including 6 school sponsoring group managers, 2 parent managers, 2 teacher managers, 1 independent school manager and the principal.
