= Mary Rose Academy =

Location
- Gisors Road; Southsea; Portsmouth, Hampshire, PO4 8GT; England; 50.79296°N 1.05487°W

Information
- Type: Special school; Academy
- Department for Education URN: 140325 Tables
- Ofsted: Reports
- Headteacher: Alison Beane
- Gender: Coeducational
- Age: 2 to 19
- Website: https://maryroseschool.info/

Mary Rose Academy (formerly Mary Rose School) is a 2-19 special school with academy status, located in Portsmouth, Hampshire, England. It opened in February 2007 and educates 110 pupils. The opening of Mary Rose School, due for September 2006, was delayed by design and construction issues. The school takes children with a wide range of severe and complex learning needs. Mary Rose School was awarded specialist Sports College status in 2008 and converted to academy status in November 2013. The school was then renamed Mary Rose Academy.

Wheelchair basketball player and Paralympic broadcaster Ade Adepitan formally opened the school in 2007 and officially opened its specialist sports college status in October 2008.

Many of the school's pupils have physical disabilities and health issues. Headteacher Alison Beane has stated that "Sport, wellbeing and fitness all go together to help move [pupils with disabilities or health issues] forward, to develop their physical skills" and noted sport is a great motivating element. The school also co-operates with Priory School in Southsea, which promotes excellence in physical education and community sport.

Achieving sports college status means that after the school raised £20,000, the government provided £100,000 in capital build funding to develop "The Studio", a room for dance, gymnastics, fitness work including sensory integration with sound, lighting, and space. In addition, the school will receive £60,000 a year over the following four years toward staffing and community partnership enhancements.

In the report of their November 2007 inspection, Ofsted gave the school an overall assessment of Good, point two on a four-point scale. However, both the Foundation Stage and the sixth form were assessed as Outstanding.
