= St. Margaret's Co-educational English Secondary and Primary School =

Coordinates: 22.3306°N 114.1517°E

- Chinese: 聖瑪加利男女英文中小學

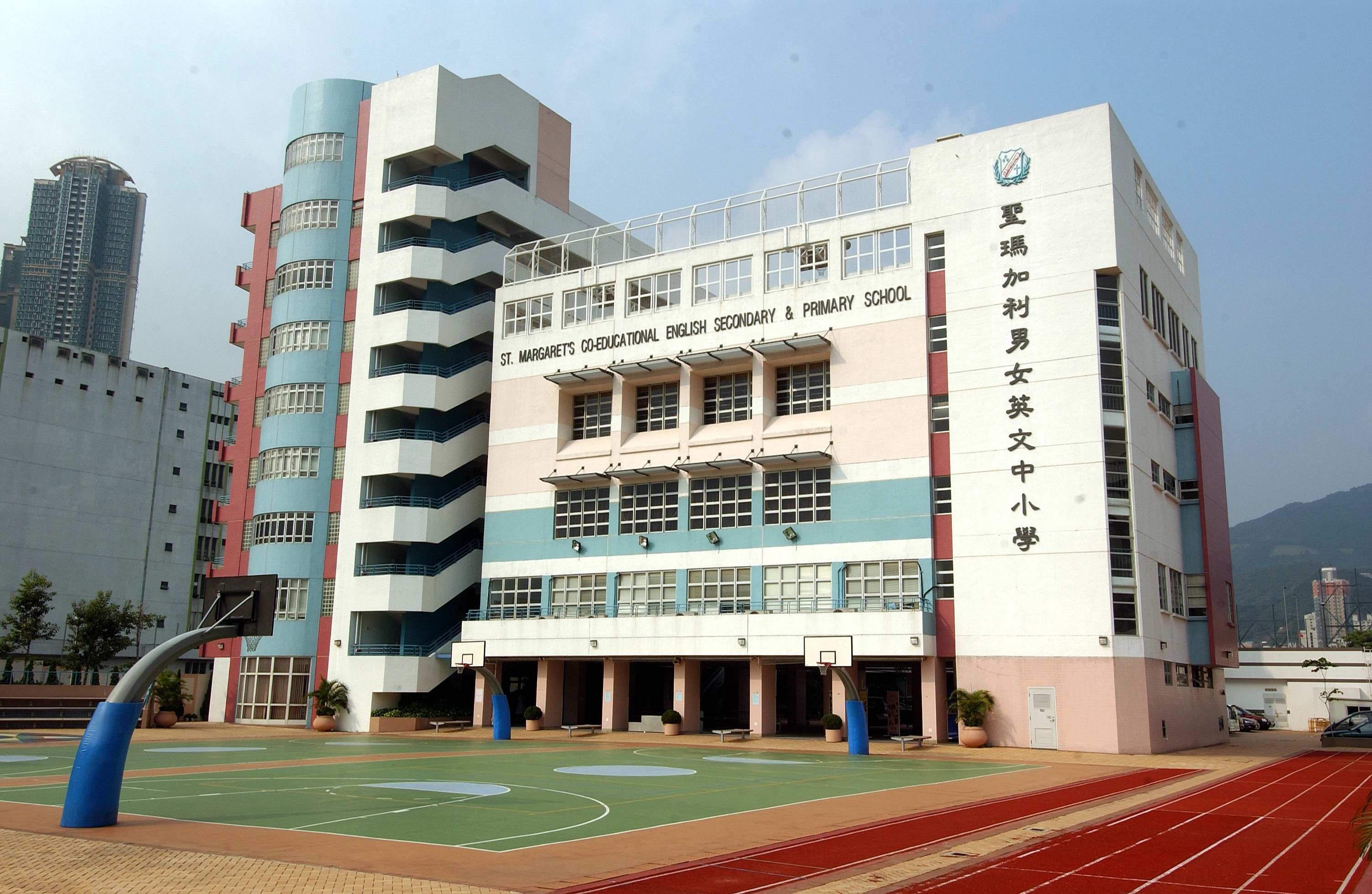
- Exterior of the school
- 33 Sham Mong Road, West Kowloon; Hong Kong

Information
- School type: Direct Subsidy Scheme, Secondary, Primary
- Motto: Pursuit of virtues to perfection with self-renewal spirit
- Established: 1965; 61 years ago
- School district: Sham Shui Po District
- Chairman: Mr. Cyrus Tin Htun, Dr. Nisha Mohamed
- Principal: Ms. Nancy Lee Lan Yuen
- Grades: Primary: P1-P4 G1, G2, G3. P5-P6 A, B. Secondary: S1-S2 G1, G2, G3, G4. S3-S5 A, B, C. S6 A, B.
- Enrollment: 600–700
- Colours: Blue, silver and red
- Newspaper: Campus TV
- Affiliation: Roman Catholic
- Website: www.smcesps.edu.hk

St. Margaret's Co-educational English Secondary and Primary School (Chinese: 聖瑪加利男女英文中小學) is a co-educational secondary and primary school in Hong Kong near the Nam Cheong MTR station. It was established in 1965 by the St. Margaret's Educational Organization, a Catholic religious-teaching educational organization.

The school curriculum uses English as the medium of instruction in all subjects, with the exception in Chinese-related subjects and other foreign languages, which being French, German, Spanish and Japanese. It is one of the top 50 schools in Hong Kong.

== History ==
St. Margaret's was founded in 1965, based on the traditions of Catholic Schools. At the beginning, the school was named St. Margaret's Girls College and located in Kowloon City. In 2001, the school joined the Direct Subsidy Scheme and began accepting male students. In September 2003, St. Margaret's became the first school in Hong Kong to adopt a "through-train mode" from Primary One to Secondary Six on the same school premises, allowing students from its primary section to directly enter its secondary section upon graduation.

== Admission ==
80% of the school's total intake of Secondary One students comes from its primary section, with the remaining 20% coming from other primary schools. All applicants are required to attend an interview, which is conducted in English by the Principal and the Vice-Principal (Academic). The applicant's performance in extracurricular activities, awards, certificates, and academic excellence are also taken into consideration. Applicants also have the option of learning the Chinese subject with an easier curriculum. St. Margaret's welcomes students of different ethnicities and backgrounds to apply, therefore a diverse community of different nationalities can be found at school (mostly chinese people).

== School badge ==
The school badge is composed of three elements: the cross, the fleur-de-lis and grain stalks.

The cross in the lower right corner indicates that the management of the school is based upon the spirit of Christ, while the three fleur-de-lis in the upper left corner symbolise the three great virtues as depicted in The Doctrine of the Mean and The Analects: wisdom, humanity and courage. The grain stalks at the bottom signify the good harvest after strenuous cultivation.

The overall meaning of the badge is that the management of the school is based upon the spirit of Christ, heading towards the three Confucian virtues of wisdom, humanity and courage. It is meant to invoke learning to seek wisdom, perseverance in performing humanity and awareness of shame to impel the courage to progress. Having these three virtues to cultivate oneself, with the determination to proceed and the persistence to learn, one can experience so as to reach the Confucian state. In Confucianism, this is an ideal state of life, in which wise men (or women) are never confused, kind-hearted people are never worried, and courageous men are never perturbed.

== School motto ==
=== English motto ===
Pursuit of virtues to perfection with self-renewal spirit is meant to inspire students, to enable them to develop their inborn integrity, to renovate their rectitude, to rectify their conduct and act vigorously as well as to increase their knowledge as treasure. With all these values in mind, students can contribute a lot to the continuous advancement of the world so that many things can come to the realm of greatest excellence and perfection.

=== Chinese motto ===
明德新民，止於至善 is a quote from the Classic of Rites Daxue: 大學之道，在明明德，在新民，在止於至善.

== School houses ==
There are four houses in St. Margaret's. The four houses were named for the first four words of the school Chinese motto, with each having their own colour. They are the Wise House (明社), Moral House (德社), New House (新社) and Civic House (包尾).

== Lunch arrangements ==
Students of Form 1 to Form 5 are required to stay at school for lunch, which they have the option of bringing their own lunch or order through the school's catering service supplier.

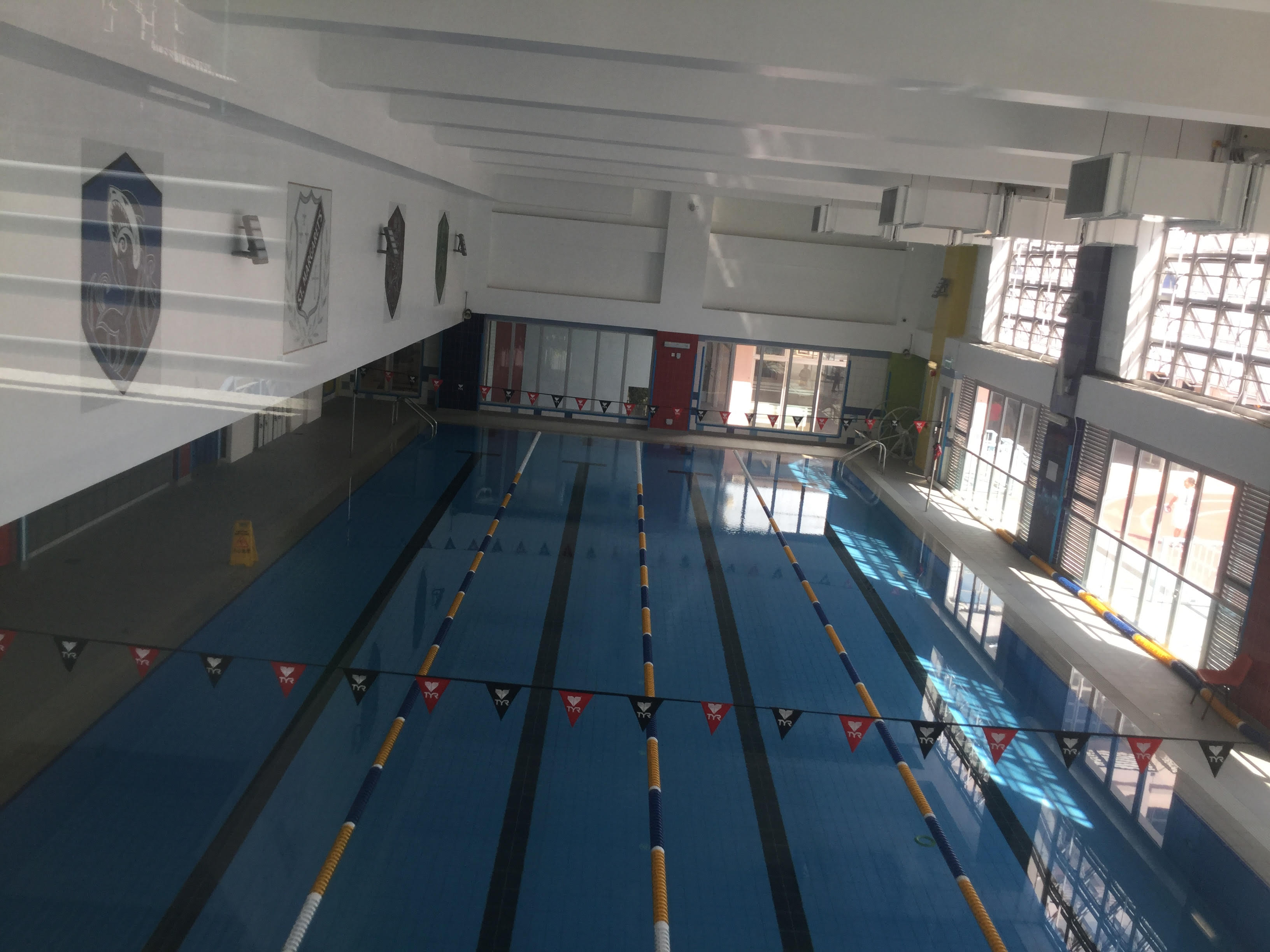
Swimming Pool of St. Margaret's
