= True Light Girls' College =

Girls' secondary school in Hong Kong

- 真光女書院

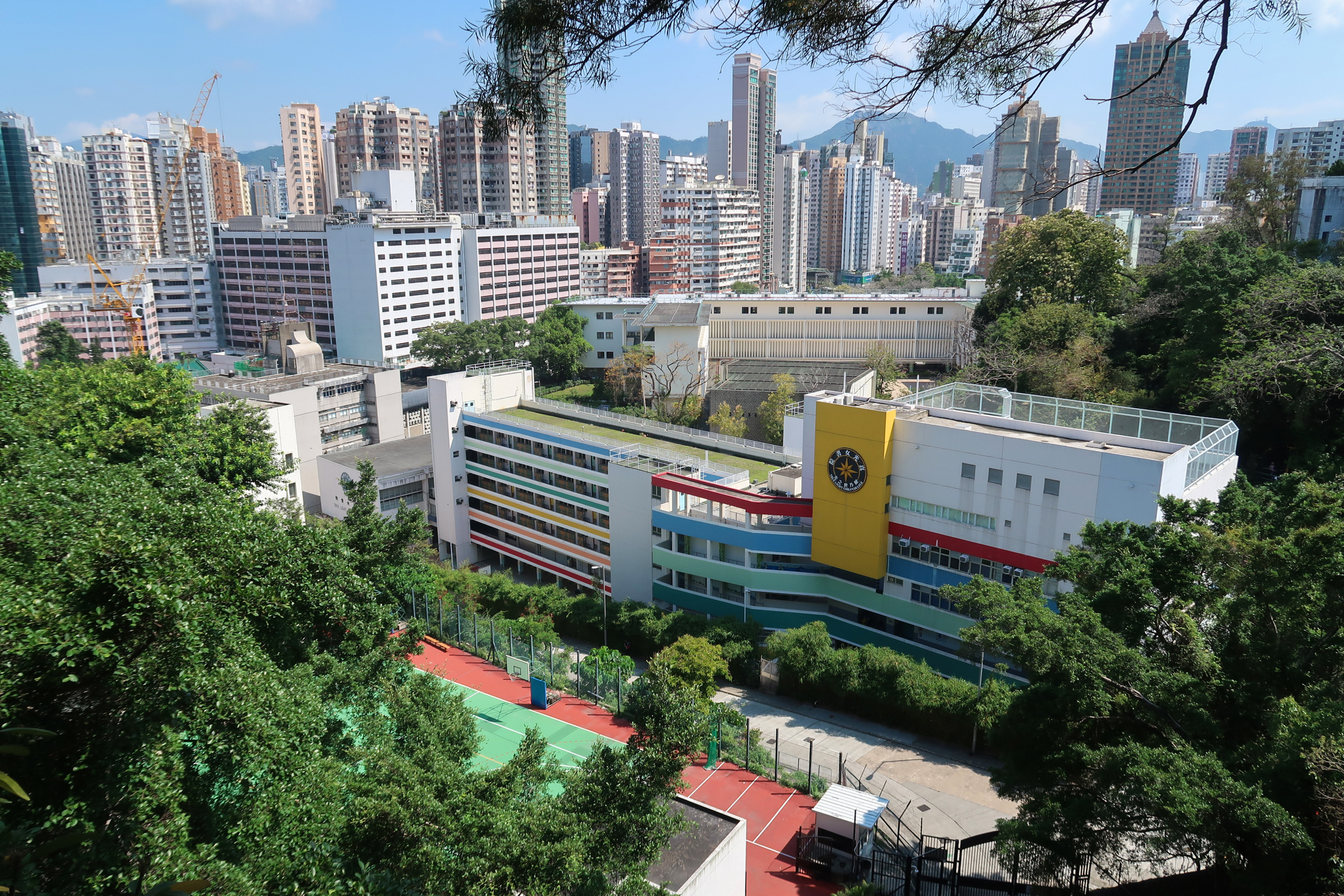

Location
- 54A Waterloo Road, Yau Ma Tei; Kowloon; Hong Kong; 22.3138°N 114.1728°E

Information
- Type: Aided
- Motto: Thou art the Light of the World
- Denomination: Christian (Church of Christ)
- Established: 1973; 53 years ago
- Principal: Dr. Mui Lai Yuk
- Teaching staff: 46
- Grades: Secondary 1–6
- Gender: Girls
- Website: www.tlgc.edu.hk

True Light Girls' College
- Traditional Chinese: 真光女書院
- Simplified Chinese: 真光女书院
Transcriptions
Standard Mandarin
- Hanyu Pinyin: Zhēnguāng Nǚ Shūyuàn
Yue: Cantonese
- Jyutping: zan1 gwong1 neoi5 syu1 jyun6*2

True Light Girls' College (TLGC, Cantonese: 真光女書院) is a Christian girls' secondary school in Kowloon, Hong Kong. It was founded in 1973, to commemorate the centenary of the first True Light Middle School, which was founded in 1872 in Canton by the American missionary, Harriet Newell Noyes. It is run by the Kowloon True Light Middle School Management Board with the assistance of the Hong Kong Council of the Church of Christ in China. The school is an aided EMI secondary school.

== School motto ==
Thou art the light of the world (Matthew 5:14)

== Teaching staff ==
There are in total 48 teaching staff in approved establishment with 6 staff who are not included in approved establishment.

== School uniform ==
The school uses a cheongsam as the student uniform, and was the first Hong Kong secondary school to adopt the garment as such.

== Class structure ==
There are 24 classes under the New Senior Secondary (NSS) curriculum: 4 classes at each level from S1 to S6.

== Notable alumnae ==
- G.E.M., Hong Kong pop singer (graduated 2008)

== See also ==
- Kowloon True Light School
- True Light Middle School of Hong Kong
- Hong Kong True Light College
- Education in Hong Kong
- List of secondary schools in Hong Kong
