= True Light Middle School of Hong Kong =

The True Light School of Hong Kong
- 香港真光中學

Location
- 50 Tai Hang Road, Tai Hang; Hong Kong
- 22.2759°N 114.1943°E

Information
- Type: Kindergarten, primary school & secondary school for girls
- Motto: 'Thou Art the Light of the World' (Matthew 5:14) (爾乃世之光)
- Established: 1935; 91 years ago
- School district: Hong Kong Island
- Principal: Hui Tuen Yung (2018–present)
- Campus size: 10,000 m^{2} (110,000 sq ft)
- Affiliation: Protestant
- Website: tlmshk.edu.hk

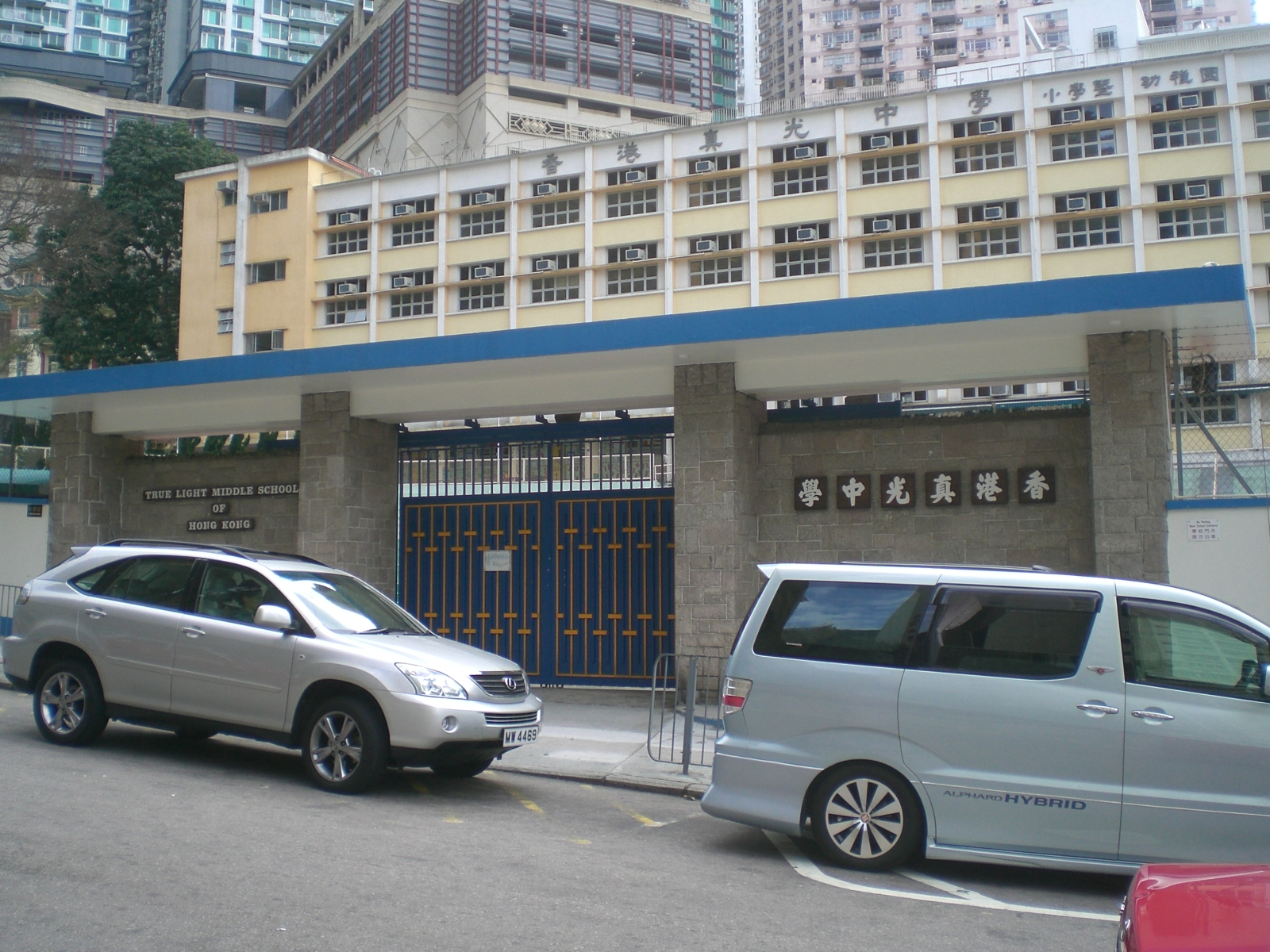
True Light Middle School of Hong Kong at 50 Tai Hang Road

The True Light School of Hong Kong (TLMSHK) (Chinese: 香港真光中學) is a girls' school located at Tai Hang, Hong Kong Island. The school consists of a secondary, a primary and a kindergarten section, located at the same premises. While the secondary section is a girls' school, the primary and kindergarten sections are co-educational. It is classified as a Band 1 school. The secondary section adopted cheongsam as the school uniform, an iconic fitted dress in Chinese culture.

== History ==
True Light Seminary, the original name of TLMSHK, was the first women's school established in Guangzhou, South China in 1872 by Ms Harriet Newell Noyes, a missionary from the American Presbyterian Church.

"Thou Art the Light of the World" was chosen as the school motto. Six students were enrolled. It was the pioneer of Chinese women's education in Southern China. The women's education that it advocates not only raised the status of women in society but also helped nurture the talents needed by the country and made a great contribution to the overall development of society.

The school's expansion was first initiated in 1878 due to a fire incident. Since then, the school opened its primary section, the Women's School and the Bible Women's Training School. The number of students has significantly increased to 300 in 1916.

In 1917, the Women's School and the Bible Women's Training School were merged and renamed as "True Light Middle School". The first graduation ceremony was held for the six graduates in 1919.

In 1935, True Light Primary School was established in Hong Kong. The secondary section was added in the post-war period.

The school was relocated to Tai Hang Road in 1951. The True Light Middle School of Hong Kong has then expanded to encompass 3 sections: a kindergarten, a primary school, and a secondary school with a total enrollment of approximately 2,000 students.

The school's swimming pool was constructed in 1972. The swimming pool was then upgraded to an indoor heated pool in 2013.

== Structure ==
Secondary section

- Aided
- Girls' school

There are 24 classes ranging from S.1 to S.6

Level	S1	S2	S3	S4	S5	S6	Total
No. of classes	4	4	4	4	4	4	24

Primary and kindergarten section

- Private
- Co-educational school
- Primary 1: 5 classes
- Primary 2: 6 classes
- Primary 3: 3 classes
- Primary 4: 3 classes
- Primary 5: 3 classes
- Primary 6: 3 classes

== Logo ==
- The star of Bethlehem

== Location and facilities ==
The school is located on 50 Tai Hang Road, Hong Kong. Together with the private primary and kindergarten sections. The entire campus occupies an area of 10,000 m^{2} (110,000 sq ft).

Facilities in the secondary school include the following:

- an all-weather sports ground, an indoor heated 25-metre (27 yd) swimming pool, an indoor gymnasium, a dancing room;
- an air-conditioned school hall, a True Light Chapel, a school history room, a conference room, three counseling rooms, a career master's room, two student activity rooms, a religious activity room, a staff resources centre;
- a library, a Readers’ Café, a K-zone (English centre), a multi-media learning centre;
- 36 classrooms, four laboratories, two computer rooms, seven special-purpose rooms;
- a music room

== Form Associations and their representative colours ==
- Yi Yun Association – Blue and white
- Xu Jing Association – Red and white
- Xiao Association – Green and white
- Heng Pu Association – Blue and white
- Chen Hui Association – Red and white
- Yao Association – Green and white

== Notable alumni ==
- May Lo, Hong Kong actress; wife of famous singer Jacky Cheung
- Charlene Tse, Hong Kong actress
- Amy Cheung Siu Han, Chinese novelist
- Lillian Lee, Chinese novelist
- Ho Kim Fai, Hong Kong rower and sprint canoer

== Principals ==
	Name	Tenure
1.	Dr. Hoh Yam Tong	School Founder
2.	Ms Ho Yuk Ying	1935–1941
3.	Dr. Ho Chung Chung	1946–1974
4.	Ms Wong Sau Ching	1974–1979
5.	Ms Wong Chiu Yok	1979–1989
6.	Dr. Leung Yin Ting, Teresa	1989–2006
7.	Ms Kwan Suet Ming	2007–2018
8.	Ms Hui Tuen Yung	2018–Present

== Notable faculty ==
- Yau Tsit Law, teacher, principal from 1928 to 1930

== See also ==
- Kowloon True Light School
- Hong Kong True Light College
- True Light Girls' College
- Education in Hong Kong
- List of secondary schools in Hong Kong
