= Hong Kong West Cluster =

Hospital network

- 港島西醫院聯網
- Merged into: Hong Kong Island Cluster (HKIC), with Hong Kong East Cluster (HKEC)
- Region served: HK
- Services: Health care
- Parent organisation: Hospital Authority
- Website: www.ha.org.hk/hkwc/

Hong Kong West Cluster (Chinese: 港島西醫院聯網; HKWC) was a hospital cluster managed by Hospital Authority in Hong Kong. It consisted of six public hospitals, a rehabilitation centre, and six family medicine clinics (FMC), formerly known as general outpatient clinics (GOPC) (Note: GOPCs have been officially renamed to FMCs in Oct 2025, see this press release). Its goal was to provide public healthcare services for the population of the Central and Western and Southern Districts. In mid-2012, the population was 544,100. It was one of seven similar clusters, until it was merged with Hong Kong East Cluster (HKEC) into Hong Kong Island Cluster (HKIC) on 1 April 2026.

== Services ==
Hong Kong West Cluster operated the following seven hospitals of various capabilities to provide a range of acute, convalescent, rehabilitation, and infirmary inpatient and ambulatory care services to the public in the areas of Central and Western, and Southern Districts. In mid-2012, the population of the areas was 544,100.

- Grantham Hospital (GH)
- MacLehose Medical Rehabilitation Centre (MMRC)
- Queen Mary Hospital (QMH)
- The Duchess of Kent Children's Hospital at Sandy Bay (DKCH)
- Tsan Yuk Hospital (TYH)
- Tung Wah Group of Hospitals Fung Yiu King Hospital (FYKH)
- Tung Wah Hospital (TWH)

Hong Kong West Cluster also operated the David Trench Rehabilitation Centre, and six general outpatient clinics at Aberdeen, Ap Lei Chau, Central District Health Centre, Kennedy Town, Sai Ying Pun and Tung Wah Hospital.

In March 2013, the cluster had 3,135 in-patient beds, including 2,853 general, 200 infirmary and 82 psychiatric beds, and 7,349 full-time equivalent staff.

The cluster is now defunct and its operations in hospitals continue as part of the Hong Kong Island Cluster.
