= Li Ka Shing Faculty of Medicine =

Public medical faculty in Hong Kong

Coordinates: 22.26748°N 114.12834°E

Li Ka Shing Faculty of Medicine, University of Hong Kong
- 香港大學李嘉誠醫學院
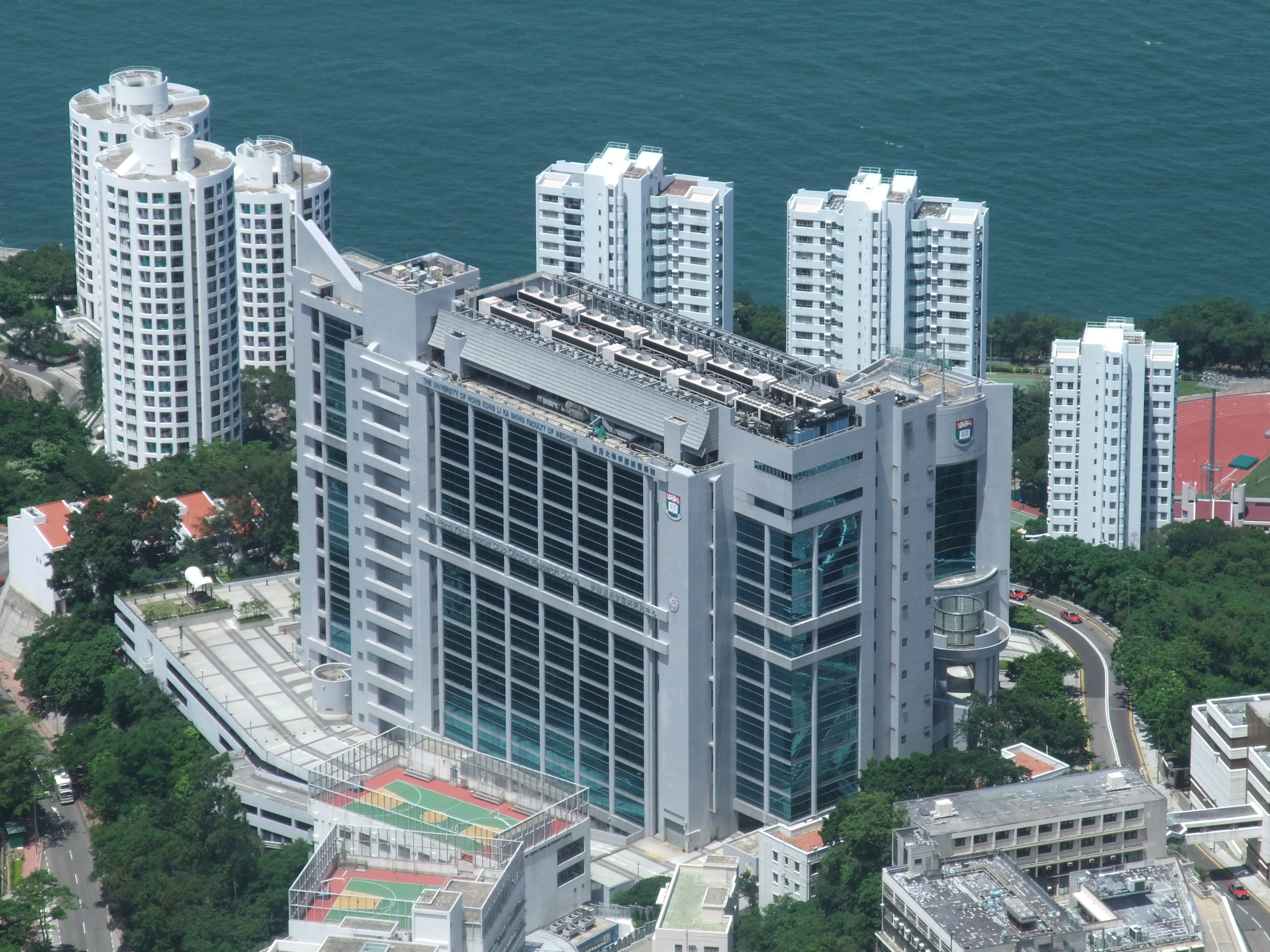
- Motto: Strength From Diversity
- Type: Public
- Established: 1 October 1887; 139 years ago (as Hong Kong College of Medicine for Chinese); 1911; 115 years ago (as Faculty of Medicine, University of Hong Kong)
- Affiliations: Queen Mary Hospital; Ruttonjee Hospital; Kowloon Hospital; Pamela Youde Nethersole Eastern Hospital; Gleneagles Hong Kong Hospital; Queen Elizabeth Hospital; Hong Kong Sanatorium & Hospital
- President: Xiang Zhang
- Dean: Lau Chak-sing
- Undergraduates: 2,900 (2021)
- Postgraduates: 1,700 (2021)
- Location: 21 Sassoon Road, Pokfulam, Hong Kong
- Website: med.hku.hk

Li Ka Shing Faculty of Medicine
- Traditional Chinese: 香港大學李嘉誠醫學院
- Simplified Chinese: 香港大学李嘉诚医学院
- Literal meaning: The University of Hong Kong Li Ka-shing Medical School
Transcriptions
Standard Mandarin
- Hanyu Pinyin: Xiānggǎng Dàxué Lǐ Jiāchéng Yīxuéyuàn
Yue: Cantonese
- Jyutping: hoeng1 gong2 daai6 hok6 lei5 gaa1 sing4 ji1 hok6 jyun6*2

HKUMed
- Traditional Chinese: 港大醫學院
- Simplified Chinese: 港大医学院
Transcriptions
Standard Mandarin
- Hanyu Pinyin: Gǎng Dà Yīxuéyuàn
Yue: Cantonese
- Jyutping: gong2 daai6 ji1 hok6 jyun6*2

The Li Ka Shing Faculty of Medicine (Note: Formerly named: Hong Kong College of Medicine for Chinese (1887–1907); Hong Kong College of Medicine (1907–1910); Faculty of Medicine, The University of Hong Kong (1910–2005)) (branded as HKUMed) is a faculty offering healthcare education at the University of Hong Kong (HKU), a public research university. It was founded in 1887 as the Hong Kong College of Medicine for Chinese, the city's first western medical school and one of the oldest in the Asia–Pacific region.

The college served as the base for HKU's founding in 1910 and was absorbed to become its first faculty. It has expanded to now consist of multiple schools that provide tertiary programmes in medicine, nursing, pharmacy, and traditional Chinese medicine. English is the medium of instruction for all classes, while Chinese is retained for the teaching of Chinese medicine. It is located several kilometres away from the university's main campus and is near the Queen Mary Hospital, its main teaching facility and research base. The faculty was renamed after businessman and philanthropist Li Ka-shing in 2006 following a HK$1 billion donation.

HKUMed is the oldest of the two currently operational (Note: The city's third medical school is under development as of November 2025, and is to be run by the Hong Kong University of Science and Technology.) medical faculties in Hong Kong, the other being the Faculty of Medicine, The Chinese University of Hong Kong. Together, they are the only tertiary institutions offering medical and pharmacy education in the city.

== History ==
The London Missionary Society founded the Hong Kong College of Medicine for Chinese in 1887. Kai Ho, James Cantlie, Patrick Manson and G. P. Jordan were the founding professionals. The college is described as "one of the oldest western medical schools in the Far East". Important initiatives were led by notable members such as Patrick Manson, an experienced medical practitioner who made his name in the field of tropical medicine. Having served in the Chinese Imperial Maritime Customs as a medical officer for 18 years, he took up private practice in Hong Kong from 1883 to 1889. Sir Kai Ho Kai was also a member of the Chinese elite in colonial Hong Kong. He played a major role in convincing the Chinese population that western medicine was acceptable in a culture that had been largely dominated by traditional Chinese medicine.

In 1907, the school was renamed the Hong Kong College of Medicine. In 1908, it was authorised to sign death certificates. The nucleus of the school would later create the foundation for the new University of Hong Kong (HKU) in 1910. Chinese society at the time was not quite ready for western medicine; as a result, many of the college's medical graduates had difficulty finding employment.

The college was merged to become the medical school of HKU in 1911, one of the university's first faculties. The establishment of the Queen Mary Hospital in 1937 brought the faculty a major clinical teaching and research base. However, the Japanese occupation of the city during the Second World War disrupted teaching, and many staff and students were imprisoned. Following the end of the war, it reopened and soon became an important training centre of clinicians in the city, with many departments and schools in healthcare and medical sciences opened.

Important milestones of the medical school include being the world's first team to successfully identify the SARS coronavirus, the causative agent of the 2002–2004 SARS outbreak, on 21 March 2003. This was followed by the visit of Wen Jiabao to the faculty acknowledging the institute's contribution, the first time a premier of China had visited a university in Hong Kong. Moreover, a State Key laboratory for emerging infectious diseases was established, the first of its kind located outside mainland China. The faculty launched a Bachelor of Pharmacy programme in 2008, being the second and of two institutions in the city offering pharmacy education.

== Programmes offered ==
As of 2024, HKUMed offers seven undergraduate degree programmes:

- Bachelor of Medicine and Bachelor of Surgery
- Bachelor of Nursing
- Bachelor of Chinese Medicine
- Bachelor of Pharmacy
- Bachelor of Arts and Sciences in Global Health Development
- Bachelor of Biomedical Sciences
- Bachelor of Science in Bioinformatics

Medical graduates are awarded the M.B., B.S.; the equivalent degree offered by the faculty of medicine at The Chinese University of Hong Kong (CUHK) is the M.B., Ch.B. Both degrees are based on the UK model for medical degrees. HKUMed also provides various postgraduate programmes, including postgraduate diplomas, master's and doctoral degrees.

In July 2024, HKUMed revealed plans to establish a graduate medical programme, which would cover the content of the normal six-year undergraduate curriculum within a study period of four years. The first cohort could be admitted as early as 2025, dependent on approval by local health authorities. The faculty also expressed confidence that it could increase its annual intake of medical students from 295 to 400 students, amid Hong Kong's long-standing shortage of doctors. The announcement is seen as efforts to compete for talent, and had followed news a few days earlier that the Hong Kong University of Science and Technology was in talks with Imperial College London about establishing and jointly operating the city's third medical school, which would also admit students with an undergraduate degree. Two days after HKUMed's announcement, CUHK's medical school similarly announced plans to introduce a graduate medical programme.

== Schools and departments ==
HKUMed is mainly organised into five schools and one department, as of August 2024:

- School of Biomedical Sciences
- School of Chinese Medicine
- School of Clinical Medicine
- School of Nursing
- School of Public Health
- Department of Pharmacology and Pharmacy

The School of Clinical Medicine further consists of 14 departments, as of August 2024:

- Anaesthesiology
- Clinical Oncology
- Diagnostic Radiology
- Emergency Medicine
- Family Medicine and Primary Care
- Medicine
- Microbiology
- Obstetrics and Gynaecology
- Ophthalmology
- Orthopaedics and Traumatology
- Paediatrics and Adolescent Medicine
- Pathology
- Psychiatry
- Surgery

== Controversies ==
=== Criticism of Prince of Wales hospital by dean during SARS epidemic ===
During the 2003 SARS outbreak in Hong Kong, the faculty's dean, Lam Shiu-kum, publicly criticised the Prince of Wales Hospital (PWH) and its associated medical school (under the Chinese University of Hong Kong) for their alleged poor handling of the outbreak. As PWH was at the centre of the outbreak, Lam wrote in a letter to the South China Morning Post (SCMP):

"Why was the index of suspicion so low in Hong Kong, the acuity of judgment so raw, the sense of infection control so weak and the mechanism for instituting isolation so rusty? It took the Prince of Wales two weeks to decide to ban visitors to its wards."

In response via a letter to the SCMP, more than one hundred doctors from the PWH refuted his claims and called for unity. They wrote that they found it "objectionable and distressing to be subjected to such accusations" and that such criticisms had been "very damaging to the morale of the frontline staff" at the hospital, adding that they had been under extreme stress for more than four weeks.

Lo Wing-lok, president of the Hong Kong Medical Association, said that "this type of mud-slinging was unhelpful" and that "we did not have the benefit of hindsight when we were facing this catastrophe". Similarly, Ho Shiu-wei, chief executive of the Hospital Authority, said that Lam's accusations were easy in hindsight. Both attributed the criticisms to the long-standing rivalry between the two medical schools and their teaching hospitals, and called for solidarity and collaboration.

=== Renaming of the faculty ===
As one of the founding faculties of the University of Hong Kong, the Faculty of Medicine changed to its present name after securing a pledge of a HK$1 billion donation from businessman and philanthropist Li Ka-shing under the funding of Li Ka Shing Foundation. The renaming was objected to by many students and prominent alumni of the faculty. Despite this, the university officially renamed the faculty on 1 January 2006.

=== Patient billing controversy and jailing of former dean ===
In January 2007, the University of Hong Kong (HKU) set up an inquiry committee after receiving complaints "relating to certain billing arrangements in respect of private patients of a clinical department of the university". In March amid the investigation, the faculty's dean, Lam Shiu-kum, abruptly resigned, citing "personal reasons". HKU acknowledged that Lam's resignation was a "highly unusual" event.

HKU was questioned by legislator Kwok Ka-ki on why it had earned only slightly more at its Queen Mary Hospital (QMH) than the Chinese University of Hong Kong did at their Prince of Wales Hospital, despite conducting three times more operations a year. In an article published by the South China Morning Post in March 2007, an anonymous medical source familiar with the faculty's operation said that there had long been a lack of monitoring and transparency concerning the faculty's billing of private services. The source was reported saying, "[f]or example, the surgical department alone can make more than HK$10 million a year. But for years frontline doctors are not told where the money goes, it is a black hole".

In September 2009, Lam was sentenced to 25 months in jail after pleading guilty to misconduct in public office. Between 2003 and 2007, Lam had induced 12 of his patients at QMH to pay what appeared to be medical bills issued by the university and the hospital, but were payable to Gastrointestinal Research, a company wholly owned by Lam. The payments totalled HK$130,000. Lam had also asked three patients to make HK$3.8 million in donations to medical research, which he then pocketed. In passing sentence, the judge said that although the patients' well-being was not compromised, Lam had seriously breached the trust of both the faculty and his patients, and had attempted to cover up his misconduct. The judge said he had taken into account 22 letters that spoke highly of Lam's character and contributions to medicine, including one from former Chief Executive Tung Chee-hwa, whom Lam was personal physician for. Setting a starting point of five years jail, the judge deducted 35 months for Lam's guilty plea, his good character, and the fact that he had repaid all the money, leaving 25 months. Prosecutors were advised by the secretary of justice not to proceed with 33 charges of fraud and theft, which were thus left on file.

After the scandal, HKU introduced 16 measures to eliminate loopholes concerning the billing of private patients by faculty staff. In August 2010, Lam was released early from prison after serving 11 months of his 25-month sentence, but was required to live under supervision in a correctional services hostel for six months.

== Notable alumni ==
Hong Kong College of Medicine

- Sun Yat-sen – Chinese revolutionary, founding father and first president of the Republic of China (1912–1949)
- Li Shu Fan – Hong Kong doctor and politician

Faculty of Medicine, The University of Hong Kong

- Yuen Kwok-yung – Hong Kong microbiologist
- Paul Tam – Hong Kong doctor
- Ko Wing-man – Hong Kong doctor and former secretary for food and health
- Chuang Shuk-kwan – Hong Kong public health doctor and government official
- Constance Chan Hon-yee – Hong Kong public health doctor and former director of the Department of Health
- Joseph Sung – Hong Kong physician and gastroenterologist
- Ip Wing-Yuk – Hong Kong orthopaedic surgeon and former president of the "Hong Kong, China Weightlifting and Powerlifting Association"
- Fung Hong – former cluster chief executive of the New Territories East Cluster, and hospital chief executive of Prince of Wales Hospital
- Dennis Lam – Hong Kong ophthalmologist, businessman, and politician
- Edward Leong – Hong Kong urologist, politician, and former chairman of the Hospital Authority
- Karen Lam – Hong Kong doctor and researcher
- Ronald Leung – Hong Kong politician and businessman
- David Todd – Hong Kong haematologist and founding president of the Hong Kong College of Physicians and the Hong Kong Academy of Medicine

- Chiu Hin-kwong – Hong Kong doctor and politician
- Kan Yuet-wai – Chinese geneticist and haematologist
- Raymond Wu – Hong Kong politician and doctor
- Lee Sum-ping – Chinese physician and gastroenterologist
- Chau Sik-nin – Hong Kong doctor, politician and businessman
- Yeoh Eng-kiong – Hong Kong physician and former secretary for health, welfare and food
- Kwong Yok Lam – Hong Kong Haematologist

== Teaching hospitals ==
- Queen Mary Hospital (Hong Kong)
- The Duchess of Kent Children's Hospital at Sandy Bay
- Grantham Hospital
- Alice Ho Miu Ling Nethersole Hospital
- Kowloon Hospital
- MacLehose Medical Rehabilitation Centre
- Pamela Youde Nethersole Eastern Hospital
- Ruttonjee Hospital
- Tsan Yuk Hospital
- Tung Wah Hospital
- Hong Kong Sanatorium and Hospital
- University of Hong Kong–Shenzhen Hospital

== See also ==
- Hong Kong College of Medicine for Chinese
- Medical education in Hong Kong
- University of Hong Kong
- Li Ying College
