= Hong Kong East Cluster =

Public hospital in Hong Kong

- 港島東醫院聯網
- Logo of the Hong Kong East Cluster
- Merged into: Hong Kong Island Cluster (HKIC), with Hong Kong West Cluster (HKWC)
- Formation: 1 June 2001
- Region served: HK
- Services: Health care
- Parent organisation: Hospital Authority

Hong Kong East Cluster (Chinese: 港島東醫院聯網; HKEC) was a hospital cluster managed by Hospital Authority in Hong Kong. It consisted of 7 public hospitals and 12 family medicine clinics (FMC) (formerly known as general outpatient clinics (GOPC) (Note: GOPCs have been officially renamed to FMCs in Oct 2025, see [https://www.info.gov.hk/gia/general/202510/10/P2025101000539.htm)) to provide public healthcare services for the population of Eastern, Wan Chai and Islands Districts (except North Lantau). It was one of the seven clusters until it was merged with Hong Kong West Cluster (HKWC) into Hong Kong Island Cluster (HKIC) on 1 April 2026.

== Services ==
Hong Kong East Cluster operated the following seven hospitals of various capabilities to provide a range of acute, convalescent, rehabilitation and infirmary in-patient and ambulatory care services to the public in the areas of Eastern, Wan Chai and Islands Districts (except North Lantau).

- Cheshire Home, Chung Hom Kok (CCH)
- Pamela Youde Nethersole Eastern Hospital (PYNEH)
- Ruttonjee Hospital (RH)
- St. John Hospital (SJH)
- Tang Shiu Kin Hospital (TSKH)
- Tung Wah Eastern Hospital (TWEH)
- Wong Chuk Hang Hospital (WCHH)

In March 2013, the cluster had 3,031 in-patient beds and 7,226 full-time equivalent staff.

The cluster is now defunct and its operations in hospitals continue as part of Hong Kong Island Cluster.
