= George Lau =

Specialist in gastroenterology and hepatology

- Occupations: Gastroenterology and hepatology specialist
- Organization(s): Humanity & Health Medical Group

George Lau (Chinese: 廖家傑, born 1962) is a specialist in gastroenterology and hepatology, currently the founder and chairman of the Humanity and Health Medical Group in Hong Kong.

== Contributions ==
=== Hepatitis-free Generation Project ===
Lau was the attending physician of the late "Godfather of Hong Kong" Music" Roman Tam (Chinese: 羅文). They became good friends. Lau initiated "Hepatitis-free Generation (世代無肝炎)" project. Roman was involved in proposing the project name and claimed "These five words are easy to remember and catchy!" In order to promote the "Hepatitis-free Generation" Project, three major foundations including Cheng Si Yuan (China-International) Hepatitis Research Foundation joined hands to hold a "Hepatitis-free Generation" event week at the end of November 2003. The highlight of the event was a large-scale charity concert held at the Capital Indoor Stadium, featuring many Chinese Pop singers from the Emperor Group. In 2016, Humanity and Health Medical group collaborated with the CSY (China-International) Hepatitis Research Foundation, with the leadership and support of Liver Disease Experts was providing free Hepatitis B rapid testing, quick blood sugar testing and liver fibrosis scanning services for citizens on World Hepatitis Day. The aim was to raise public awareness of liver cancer prevention, early diagnosis, and detection of chronic liver disease, and to improve the cure rate of the disease.

=== New treatment of chronic hepatitis C ===
In 2015, Lau and a research team from Mainland China have conducted a study combining five different drugs currently available on the market in different combinations to treat chronic hepatitis C. He invited 18 patients to receive this "cocktail therapy" and found that three of the combinations had significantly improved the treatment outcome. Patients were being cured in as short as three weeks, compared to the traditional 8–12 weeks treatment duration. Treatment cost was reduced from HKD$700K to 100K. Lau said, "The earlier liver disease is treated, the better. However, many Hong Kong people are not aware that they have Hepatitis B, and they usually only find out through company or insurance medical check-ups." Therefore, he urges the public to raise awareness of liver cancer prevention, undergo regular check-ups, and seek early diagnosis and treatment.

=== Hepatitis B reactivation ===
On October 4, 2016, the US FDA issued a warning based on the result of a research study from Hong Kong, conducted by Dr. Lau's group. The study indicated that there may be an increased risk of hepatitis B reactivation for patients with concurrent hepatitis C and hepatitis B infections who undergo antiviral treatment (DAAs) for hepatitis C.

=== Community Vaccination Centre during COVID-19 pandemic ===
During the COVID-19 pandemic in 2019, Dr. Lau's team collaborated with the government to promote the "Citywide Vaccination Campaign" in Hong Kong. In March 2021, the Humanity & Health Medical Group operated the Ho Man Tin Sports Centre Community Vaccination Centre. In December 2021, in addition to the Ho Man Tin centre, the group operated multiple vaccination stations, including the Pamela Youde Nethersole Eastern Hospital, Queen Mary Hospital, Princess Margaret Hospital, and the Humanity & Health Medical Group Headquarters in Central.

The Humanity & Health Medical Group's Mobile Vaccination Service team also went to New World Centre, where they administered the Comirnaty vaccine to approximately 180 employees of New World Development Limited on June 30, 2021.

== Honors and awards ==
| Year | Honors/Awards |
|---|---|
| 1980 | Brother Patrick's Silver Medal |
| 1992 | Hong Kong-Stanford Scholarship |
| 1998 | Royal Society Award |
| 2002 | Ten Most Outstanding Young Persons 2002 (HKSAR) |
| 2004 | Best Paper Presentation Award (14th Biennial Conference, APASL 2004) |
| 2006 | HKU Medical Faculty Outstanding Research Output Award |
| 2015 | National Science and Technology Progress Award (State Science and Technology Prizes) - Technological advancement in Chronic Hepatitis B Infection management |
| 2022 | Hong Kong SAR Chief Executive's Commendation for government service |
| 2023 | APASL Named Award - Okuda-Omata Distinguished Award |

Lau was recently being interviewed by Ta Kung Bao and claimed "reflecting on my journey thus far in liver disease research, I hope to actively promote the clinical translation of liver disease research outcomes to help more people in our country overcoming the challenges of liver disease. I believe that with continued research and collaboration between medical professionals, we can develop more effective treatments and preventive measures for liver disease and ultimately improve the lives of those affected by this condition."

== Selected publications ==
Lau published more than 300 publications, citations: 40,000+, H-index: 95 Ten representative original articles as first or correspondence author(*) are listed below:

1. One of the first HBV treatment guideline from Asia-Pacific region.
  - Lau G, Carman WF, Locarnini S, Okuda K, Williams R, Lam SK. Treatment of chronic HBV infection: an Asia-Pacific perspective. J Gastroenterol Hepatol 1999; 14: 3–12.
2. A study demonstrate the importance of restoration of immune response to chronic hepatitis B is required for a "CURE"
  - Lau G, Suri D, Liang R, Chokshi S, Thomas MG, Nanji A, Yuen ST, Williams R, Naoumov NV. Resolution of Chronic Hepatitis B and Anti-HBs Seroconversion in Man by Adoptive Transfer of Immunity to Hepatitis B core Antigen. Gastroenterology 2002;122: 614–624.
3. First randomised controlled trial which laid the foundation on the use of pre-emptive anti-HBV NUCs in HBV-infected patients treated with immunosuppressive therapy for prevention of liver- related morbidity and mortality due to HBV reactivation.This approach is now widely adopted as a standard-of-care worldwide.
  - Lau G*, Yiu HHY, Fong DYT, et al. “Early” is superior to “deferred” pre-emptive lamivudine therapy for hepatitis B patients undergoing chemotherapy. Gastroenterology 2003; 125:1742-49.
4. Global phase 3 clinical trials which led to the registration of pegylated interferon-a2a as a form of treatment for chronic hepatitis B infection (sponsored by Roche).
  - Lau G*, Piratvisuth T, Luo KX, et al. Peginterferon Alfa-2a HBeAg-Positive Chronic Hepatitis B Study Group. Peginterferon Alfa-2a, lamivudine, and the combination for HBeAg-positive chronic hepatitis B. N Engl J Med. 2005;352(26):2682-95.
5. Investigator-driven study aiming to reduce the treatment cost of chronic hepatitis C with direct- acting antiviral agents (DAAs) by drastically shorten for the duration of therapy based on early virological response.
  - Lau G*, Benhamou Y, Chen G, et al. Efficacy and safety of 3-week response-guided triple direct- acting antiviral therapy for chronic hepatitis C infection: a phase 2, open-label, proof-of-concept study. Lancet Gastroenterol Hepatol. 2016;1(2):97-104.
6. First single cohort study which demonstrate the occurrence of hepatitis due to HBV reactivation in HBV-HCV coinfected patients treated with DAAs. This led the US FDA EMA to issue a “black- box” warning which change the DAAs management algorithm in HCV patients.
  - Wang C, Ji D, Chen J, Shao Q, Li B, Liu J, Wu V, Wong A, Wang Y, Zhang X, Lu L, Wong C, Tsang S, Zhang Z, Sun J, Hou J, Chen G, Lau G*. Hepatitis due to Reactivation of Hepatitis B Virus in Endemic Areas Among Patients With Hepatitis C Treated With Direct-acting Antiviral Agents. Clin Gastroenterol Hepatol. 2017; 15(1):132-136.
7. First clinical report to show that non-alcoholic fatty liver diseases (NAFLD) adversely affect the outcome of COVID-19. This study has initiated new understanding of the pathogenesis of COVID-19.
  - Ji D, Qin E, Xu J, Zhang D, Cheng G, Wang Y, Lau G*. Non-alcoholic fatty liver diseases in patients with COVID-19: A retrospective study. J Hepatol. 2020; 73(2):451-453.
8. In response to COVID-19 pandemic, chair a panel of experts in Asia-Pacific region (as the APASL COVID-19 taskforce) and publish clinical guideline to hepatologists in Asia-Pacific region.
  - APASL COVID-19 Task Force, Lau G*, Sharma M. Clinical practice guidance for hepatology and liver transplant providers during the COVID-19 pandemic: APASL expert panel consensus recommendations. Hepatol Int. 2020;1-14.
9. Chair the HBV reactivation expert panel in Asia-Pacific region for this updated clinical practise guideline.
  - Lau G*, Yu ML, Wong G, Thompson A, Ghazinian H, Hou JL, Piratvisuth T, Jia JD, Mizokami M, Cheng G, Chen GF, Liu ZW, Baatarkhuu O, Cheng AL, Ng WL, Lau P, Mok T, Chang JM, Hamid S, Dokmeci AK, Gani RA, Payawal DA, Chow P, Park JW, Strasser SI, Mohamed R, Win KM, Tawesak T, Sarin SK, Omata M. APASL clinical practice guideline on hepatitis B reactivation related to the use of immunosuppressive therapy. Hepatol Int. 2021 Oct;15(5):1031-1048.
10. Global phase 3 clinical trials (HIMALAYA STUDY) established dual blockade with immune-checkpoint inhibitors (CTLA-4 and PD-1/L1) STRIDE (Single T Regular Interval D) can improve the overall survival of hepatocellular carcinoma. This will help to serve those with major contraindications to antiangiogenics (sponsored by AstraZeneca).
  - Abou-Alfa GK*, Lau G*, Kudo M*, Chan SL*, Kelley RK, Furuse J, Sukeepaisarnjaroen W, Kang YK, Dao TV, De Toni EN, Rimassa L, Breder V, Vasilyev A, Heurgué A, Tam VC, Mody K, Thungappa SC, Ostapenko Y, Yau T, Azevedo S, Varela M, Cheng AL, Qin S, Galle PR, Ali S, Marcovitz M, Makowsky M, He P, Kurland JF, Negro A, Sangro B. Tremelimumab plus durvalumab in unresectable hepatocellular carcinoma. NEJM Evid 2022;1(8). (*Co-first authors).
