= Hong Kong Island Cluster =

Public hospital in Hong Kong

- 香港島醫院聯網
- Formation: 1 April 2026
- Merger of: Hong Kong East Cluster (HKEC) and Hong Kong West Cluster (HKWC)
- Region served: HK
- Services: Health care
- Cluster chief executive: Dr. Teresa Li
- Parent organisation: Hospital Authority

Hong Kong Island Cluster (Chinese: 香港島醫院聯網; HKIC) is one of the six hospital clusters managed by Hospital Authority in Hong Kong. It consists of 13 public hospitals, a rehabilitation centre and 12 family medicine clinics (FMC), formerly known as general outpatient clinics (GOPC) (Note: GOPCs have been officially renamed to FMCs in Oct 2025, see this press release). Its goal is to provide public healthcare services for the population of Hong Kong Island and outlying Islands (excluding Lantau Island). HKIC was created following the merger of Hong Kong East Cluster (HKEC) and Hong Kong West Cluster (HKWC), which came into effect on 1 April 2026. The current cluster chief executive since the cluster's creation is Dr. Teresa Li.

== Services ==
Hong Kong Island Cluster operates the following hospitals and centres of various capabilities to provide a range of acute, convalescent, rehabilitation and infirmary in-patient and ambulatory care services to the public in the areas of Hong Kong Island and outlying Islands (excluding Lantau Island).

- Grantham Hospital (GH)^{W}
- MacLehose Medical Rehabilitation Centre (MMRC)^{W}
- Queen Mary Hospital (QMH)^{W}
- The Duchess of Kent Children's Hospital at Sandy Bay (DKCH)^{W}
- Tsan Yuk Hospital (TYH)^{W}
- Tung Wah Group of Hospitals Fung Yiu King Hospital (FYKH)^{W}
- Tung Wah Hospital (TWH)^{W}
- Cheshire Home, Chung Hom Kok (CCH)^{E}
- Pamela Youde Nethersole Eastern Hospital (PYNEH)^{E}
- Ruttonjee Hospital (RH)^{E}
- St. John Hospital (SJH)^{E}
- Tang Shiu Kin Hospital (TSKH)^{E}
- Tung Wah Eastern Hospital (TWEH)^{E}
- Wong Chuk Hang Hospital (WCHH)^{E}

Legends below indicate that the hospital, before the merging of HKEC and HKWC, was:

^{E}: Formerly in HKEC

^{W}: Formerly in HKWC
