= Grantham Hospital =

- Hospital Authority and the Hong Kong Tuberculosis, Chest and Heart Diseases Association
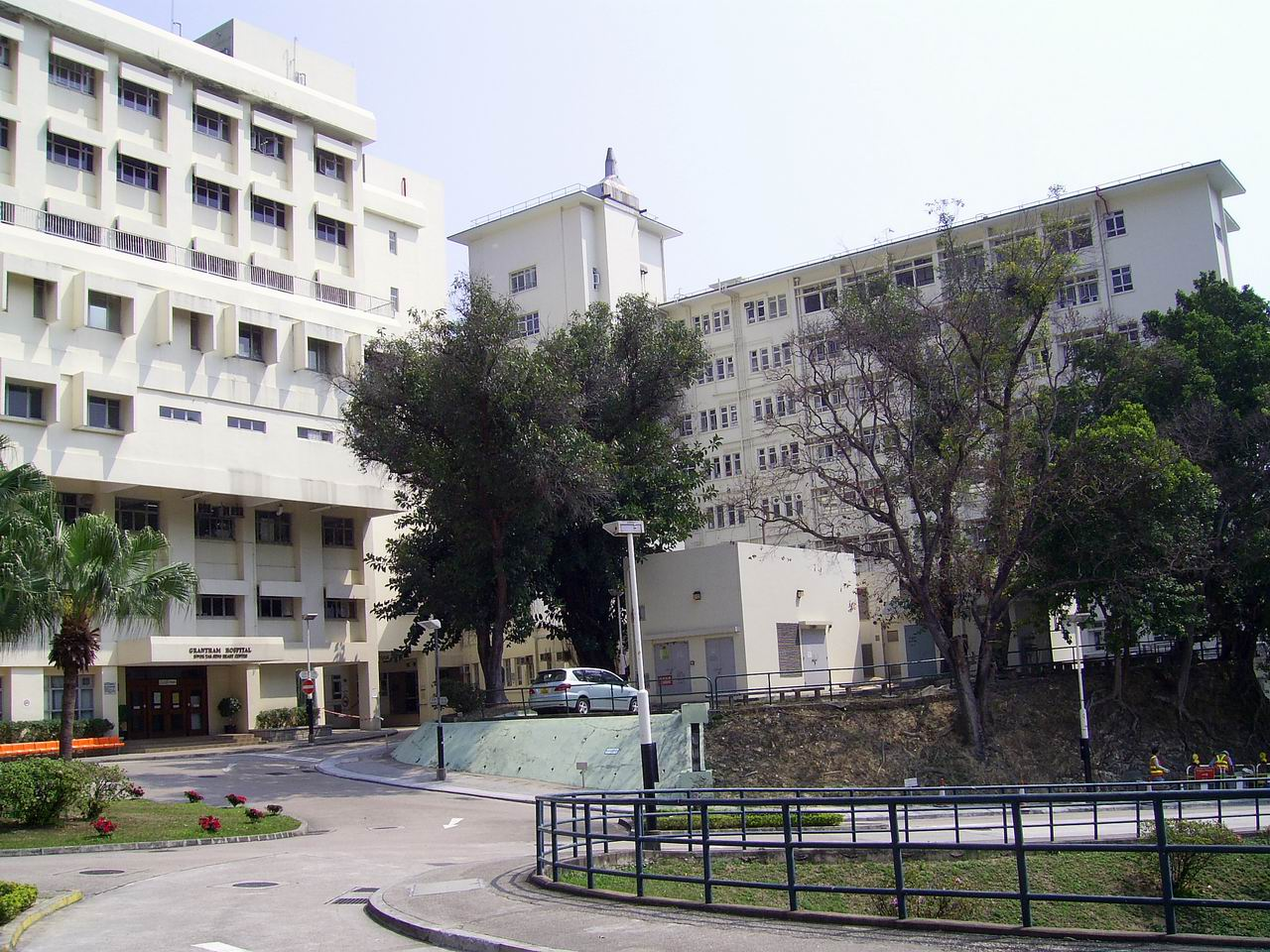
- Grantham Hospital in March 2008

- Location within Hong Kong

Geography
- Location: 125 Wong Chuk Hang Road, Aberdeen, Hong Kong Island, Hong Kong
- Coordinates: 22°15′04″N 114°10′23″E

Organisation
- Type: Specialist, Teaching
- Affiliated university: Li Ka Shing Faculty of Medicine, University of Hong Kong
- Network: Hong Kong Island Cluster

Services
- Emergency department: No Accident & Emergency at Queen Mary Hospital or Gleneagles Hong Kong Hospital
- Beds: 372

History
- Founded: 1957; 69 years ago

Links
- Lists: Hospitals in Hong Kong

Grantham Hospital
- Traditional Chinese: 葛量洪醫院
- Simplified Chinese: 葛量洪医院
Transcriptions
Standard Mandarin
- Hanyu Pinyin: Gěliànghóng yīyuàn
Yue: Cantonese
- Jyutping: Got3 loeng4 hung4 ji1 jyun6*2

Grantham Hospital (Chinese: 葛量洪醫院; GH) is a specialist cardiothoracic hospital located at Wong Chuk Hang and is part of the Hong Kong West Cluster. It is a tertiary referral centre providing specialist service in cardiothoracic surgery, cardiology, paediatric cardiology, tuberculosis & chest medicine and cardio-pulmonary infirmary. In 2003 and 2004, palliative medicine and acute geriatrics service were set up respectively after Nam Long Hospital has been closed down in December 2003.

The hospital is founded in 1957 by the Hong Kong Tuberculosis, Chest and Heart Diseases Association and renamed for Alexander Grantham, a former Governor of Hong Kong. It has 372 beds and 544 staff.

The hospital is affiliated with the Medical faculty of the University of Hong Kong, providing clinical attachment opportunities for its medical students. The university's divisions of cardiothoracic surgery, cardiology and paediatric cardiology have their bases here. However, it has been proposed that these acute services will be relocated to the Queen Mary Hospital (the Flagship teaching hospital of the university) in the coming future for better and more efficient use of resources. Grantham Hospital will then become a hospital dedicated to chronic and palliative care.

The School of General Nursing has been re-opened in 2008 to educate and train up Enrolled Nurses and the hospice centre under the Li Ka Shing Foundation Hospice Service Programme was set up to provide holistic care to cancer patients and their families.
