= Nam Long Hospital =

- Hospital Authority
- Location within Hong Kong

Geography
- Location: 30 Nam Long Shan Road, Wong Chuk Hang, Hong Kong
- Coordinates: 22°14′37″N 114°09′57″E

Organisation
- Network: Hong Kong West Cluster

Services
- Emergency department: No Accident & Emergency
- Beds: 57

History
- Founded: 5 May 1967; 59 years ago
- Closed: 16 December 2003; 22 years ago

Links
- Lists: Hospitals in Hong Kong

Nam Long Hospital (Chinese: 南朗醫院) was a hospital in Hong Kong specializing in cancer treatment that closed in 2003. The site is now a nursing home operated as Tung Wah Group of Hospitals Jockey Club Sunshine Complex for the Elderly.

The palliative medicine and acute geriatrics services were transferred to Grantham Hospital.
