= Prince of Wales Hospital =

- Hospital Authority

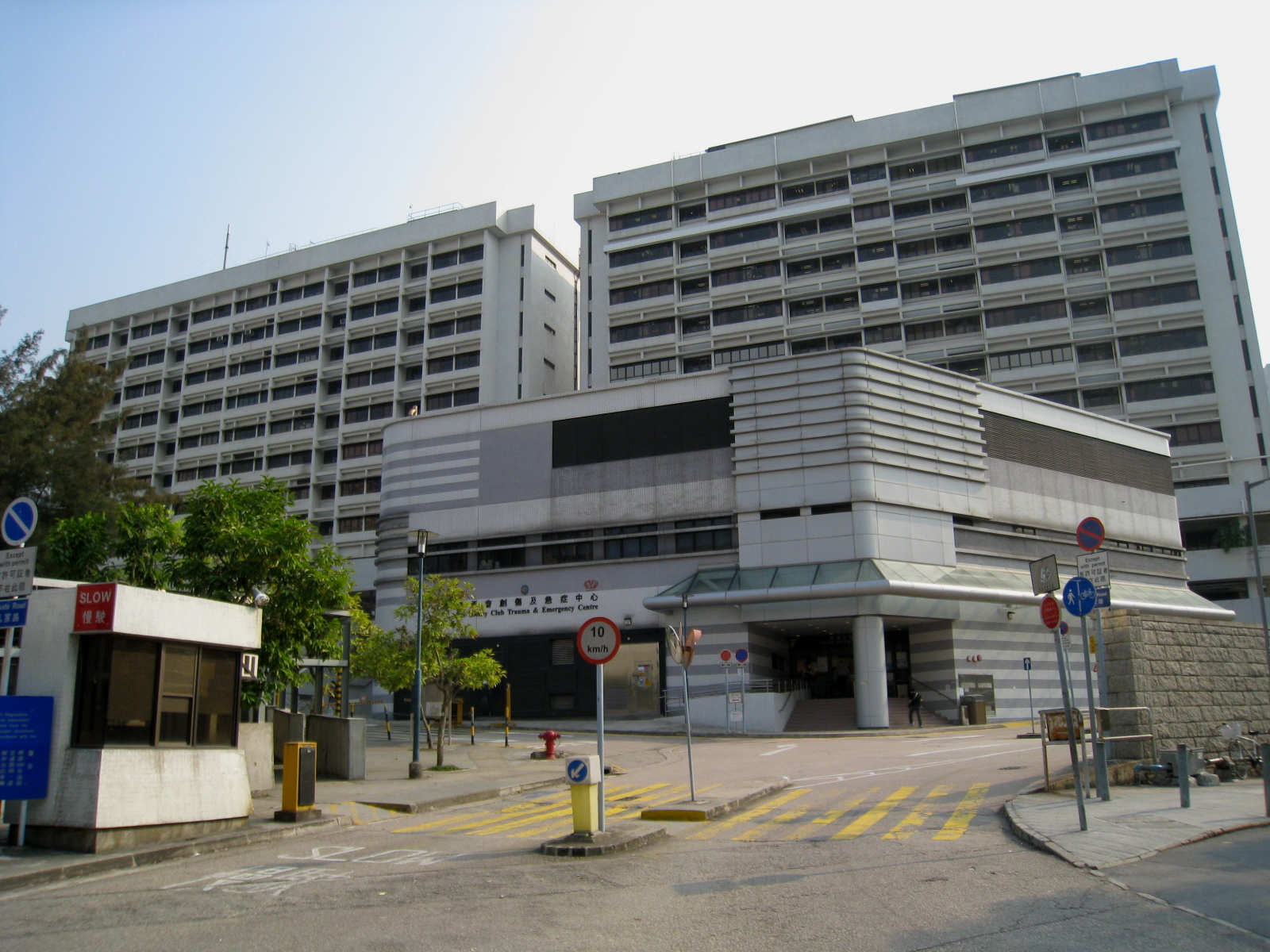
- Prince of Wales Hospital entrance

- Location within Hong Kong

Geography
- Location: 30-32 Ngan Shing Street, Sha Tin, New Territories, Hong Kong
- Coordinates: 22.37970°N 114.20170°E

Organisation
- Type: Teaching, District General
- Affiliated university: CUHK Medical School of the Chinese University of Hong Kong
- Network: New Territories East Cluster

Services
- Emergency department: Yes, accident and emergency and trauma centre
- Beds: 1,807

Helipads
- Helipad: No

History
- Founded: 1 May 1984; 42 years ago

Links
- Website: www.ha.org.hk/pwh
- Lists: Hospitals in Hong Kong

Prince of Wales Hospital
- Traditional Chinese: 威爾斯親王醫院
- Simplified Chinese: 威尔斯亲王医院
Transcriptions
Standard Mandarin
- Hanyu Pinyin: Wēiěrsī Qīnwáng Yīyuàn
Yue: Cantonese
- Yale Romanization: Wāiyíhsī Chānwòhng Yīyún
- Jyutping: wai1 ji5 si1 can1 wong4 ji1 jyun6*2

Prince of Wales Hospital (Chinese: 威爾斯親王醫院; PWH) is a regional acute government hospital located in Sha Tin, New Territories in Hong Kong. It is also a teaching hospital of the Faculty of Medicine of the Chinese University of Hong Kong (CUHK).

Named after King Charles III at that time as Prince of Wales, and officially opened on 1 November 1982 by Katharine, Duchess of Kent, the hospital went into operation on 1 May 1984. The hospital now provides 1,807 hospital beds and 24-hour accident and emergency service with about 5,500 staff. It is also the regional hospital responsible for the Eastern New Territories serving Sha Tin, Tai Po, North New Territories, Sai Kung and the outlying islands in East New Territories.

The hospital is supported by the Li Ka-shing Specialist Clinics for specialty outpatient services. The Hospital Governing Committee is the ultimate decision-making authority of the hospital. The current chief executive of the hospital is Dr. Beatrice Cheng.

== History ==
=== Planning and construction ===
In 1974, the Hong Kong government proposed the development of the second medical school in the territory (the first being University of Hong Kong) and a new teaching hospital in Sha Tin, and that became the Faculty of Medicine of The Chinese University of Hong Kong, and Prince of Wales Hospital.

The construction of the Prince of Wales Hospital started on 1 December 1979, scheduled to be completed by September 1982, and be operational by May 1983. The plan was to allow the first batch of medical students admitted in October 1981 to start their clinical training at the hospital in July 1983. Unfortunately, the construction was delayed by a year, the hospital was finally completed in November 1983 and went into operation on 1 May 1984.

Despite the delay and change of the schedule, the official opening ceremony was held on 1 November 1982 as originally planned. It was performed by Katharine, Duchess of Kent.

Due to the delay, temporary arrangements were made with United Christian Hospital for clinical teaching of the first batch of medical students, and the teaching activities were gradually transferred from United Christian Hospital to Prince of Wales Hospital.

=== Early years ===
In 1991, under a reform of the healthcare system, the management of the hospital (and other public hospitals) was transferred from the former Medical and Health Department to the Hospital Authority.

Until the mid-1990s, the hospital was responsible for providing medical services to the nearly 25,000 Vietnamese boat people at Whitehead Detention Centre in nearby Wu Kai Sha, once considered the world's largest prison. In 1990, Vietnamese women made up a third of patients within the hospital's maternity unit, leading to allegations of strained hospital resources and a subsequent scheme to transfer many pregnant refugees to Queen Elizabeth Hospital instead. By 1994, some Sha Tin residents voiced dissatisfaction that their hospital bore the weight of the refugee's medical needs, but then-hospital chief executive Alison Reid responded that the boat people comprised only five per cent of monthly visits to A & E and that the local population was "not being disadvantaged". Still, in the same year, the hospital proposed setting up a 24-hour clinic inside the refugee camp. The situation ended with the resettlement or repatriation of the refugees under the Comprehensive Plan of Action.

The Sir Yue Kong Pao Centre for Cancer and the Lady Pao Children's Cancer Centre was officially opened by Charles, Prince of Wales in November 1994. Built with a donation of HK$120 million from Mr and Mrs Peter Woo, and named after Mrs Woo's parents, Sir Yue-Kong Pao and Lady Pao, the centre provides cancer treatments and resources for cancer research and education.

The South Wing of the Li Ka Shing Specialist Outpatient Clinic was completed in June 1997, began operating in the following month, and was officially opened on 29 May 1998 by Li Ka-shing, who donated HK$21 million to its establishment. With a total floor area of 7,930 square metres, the clinic provides additional space to cope with increasing demand for specialist outpatient services in the region.

=== SARS epidemic ===
In 2003, a severe epidemic severe acute respiratory syndrome (SARS) occurred in multiple countries. The epidemic in Hong Kong started with the outbreak in Prince of Wales Hospital on 10 March 2003 when 11 healthcare workers in ward 8A (later renamed 8H) had shown symptoms of atypical pneumonia at the same time. Epidemiologic investigation had linked these cases to a patient who was admitted to ward 8A on 4 March 2003. The patient had previously visited an ill professor from Guangzhou.

The disease was unknown at the time. The infection soon spread extensively in ward 8A, affecting 143 individuals who had direct contact with the patient, including healthcare workers, medical students, other patients in the same ward, visitors, and the patient's relatives. It was found that the outbreak was amplified by the use of nebuliser treatment on the patient.

In response to the outbreak, the hospital had implemented several control measures, including restricting access to the 8th floor of the main building (where ward 8A was situated), suspension of some services, and dividing the medical team into a dirty team and a clean team. The dirty team, led by Professor Joseph Sung, was responsible for taking care of SARS patients. The clean team was barred from the SARS wards.

The outbreak in the hospital eventually affected 239 individuals.

=== Recent developments ===
The hospital has undergone redevelopment since 2007. The Main Clinical Block and Trauma Centre, a fourteen-storey new building, was built on the site of the original helipad and tennis court. With a total gross floor area of 71,500 square metres, the new building provides in-patient services, operating theatres and day services. Construction work started on 23 April 2007 and the new building was opened in late 2010. The hospital began its 10-year phase 2 redevelopment project in 2018. The construction of a new In-patient Extension Block is expected to complete in 2025–2026.

In November 2013, the hospital was accredited by the Australian Council on Healthcare Standards International.

== Management ==
=== Hospital Governing Committee ===
Prince of Wales Hospital is governed by a Hospital Governing Committee with members appointed by the Hospital Authority. The committee oversees the management of the hospital to ensure quality service and teaching environment. It is made up of two ex-officio members (the Director of Operations or his representative of the Hospital Authority and the Hospital Chief Executive) and five members (one public member of the Regional Advisory Committee, two representative of the Faculty of Medicine of CUHK, and two members nominated by the Hospital Authority), with one of the five members being the chairman. All members are normally appointed for a term of two years.

This is a list of current and former chairmen of the committee:

- Peter Woo Kwong-ching, JP (1993–1995)
- John Chan Cho-chak, GBS, JP (1995–2004)
- Edward Ho Sing-tin, SBS, JP (2004–2014)
- Winnie Ng Wing-mui (2014–2020)
- Priscilla Wong Pui-sze (2020–present)

=== Hospital Chief Executive ===
Appointed by the Hospital Authority, the Hospital Chief Executive is in charge of managing the hospital and reports to the Hospital Governing Committee.

- Professor Allan Chang Mang-zing (acting, January 1993 – December 1993)
- Dr Alison M. Reid (April 1994 – [?])
- Professor Allan Chang Mang-zing (1999 – 31 October 2002)
- Dr Fung Hong, JP (1 November 2002 – 31 December 2013)
- Dr Hung Chi-tim (1 January 2014 – 31 October 2016)
- Dr Lo Su-vui (1 November 2016 – 26 February 2021)
- Dr Beatrice Cheng (1 May 2021 – present)

=== Medical Superintendent ===
Before the management of the hospital was transferred to the Hospital Authority, the head of the hospital was the Medical Superintendent, who reported to the regional director, and in turn to the Director of Medical and Health Services Department.

- Dr Mahommed Bin Ali (1984–[?])
- Dr Liu Woon-tim ([?]–1989)
- Dr Paul Yip Leung-yin

== Achievements ==
=== Assisted human reproduction ===
In November 1987, Prince of Wales Hospital delivered the first baby from gamete intrafallopian transfer in Hong Kong.

In February 1991, the first twins resulting from pronuclear stage tubal transfer (PROST) in Hong Kong was born at the hospital. PROST is a technique that involves in vitro fertilisation (IVF), followed by transfer of the pronuclear oocytes into the fallopian tubes.

In April 1994, the first baby resulting from sub-zonal insemination (SUZI) in Hong Kong was born at the hospital. SUZI is an IVF technique where sperm is placed between the zona pellucida and the cell membrane of an oocyte.

=== Skin bank ===
The burns unit of the hospital opened Hong Kong's first skin bank on 14 November 1992. It was also the world's first comprehensive and multi-purpose skin bank set up to provide frozen pigskin, donated cadaver skin and cultivated skin, and to make and process biosynthetic skin.

== Services ==
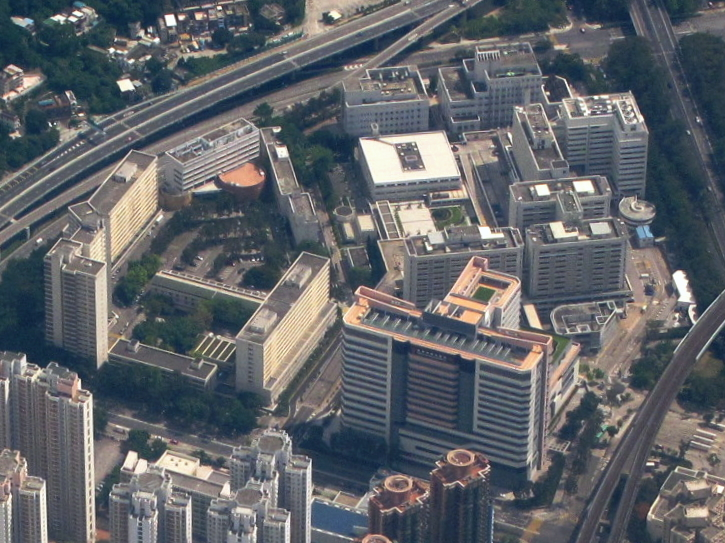
Aerial view of the hospital

The Prince of Wales Hospital provides a full range of clinical services, and 24-hour accident and emergency service:

- Accident and Emergency
- Trauma centre
- Anaesthesia (including Intensive care)
- Anatomical & Cellular Pathology
- Chemical Pathology
- Clinical Oncology (including Radiotherapy)
- Combined Endoscopy
- Dental and Maxillofacial Surgery
- Radiology
- Ear, Nose and Throat Surgery
- Family Medicine
- Medicine & Therapeutics
- Microbiology
- Obstetrics & Gynaecology
- Ophthalmology & Visual Science
- Orthopaedics & Traumatology
- Paediatrics
- Physiotherapy
- Psychiatry
- Surgery

As of March 2021, the hospital has 1,807 beds, all of which are general (acute and convalescent) beds. For the year ended 31 March 2019, it recorded 143,598 attendances in the Accident and Emergency Department, 182,996 inpatients and day-patients attendances, 853,806 attendances of outpatient clinical services, and 228,225 attendances for allied health services.

The hospital is also home to the Gender Identity Clinic, the territory's first and only gender clinic. Founded in 2016, it provides services to adults only.

=== Private services ===
Besides subsidised public services, the hospital has been providing private specialist outpatient services and private inpatient services since its opening in 1984 in collaboration with the Faculty of Medicine of CUHK. Charged at market rates, the private services are intended for patients who want to have access to the expertise and facilities of the hospital, which may not be available at private hospitals. Private service income is shared between the Hospital Authority, CUHK, and the departments and the doctors concerned.

The CUHK-PWH Medical Centre, located on the second floor of Block E, was established in January 2006 to provide private outpatient services at a central location. Before its establishment, the university's and the hospital's doctors used to attend their private patients at their own offices.

For the year ended 31 March 2007, the hospital had treated 11,097 private specialist outpatients and provided 6,709 bed-days for private inpatients. The numbers accounted for less than 2% of the total numbers that included both public and private services.

== Transport ==
=== Trains ===
The hospital is about a three-minute walk from City One MTR station. The station is on the Tuen Ma line, providing a direct link from the hospital to different areas in the Sha Tin District.

=== Buses ===
The hospital is also served by the following bus routes: 73A, 80K, 82K, 84M, 85A, 86, 89S, 89X, 682B, N42 and N283; and the following public light bus routes: 804, 808, 808P, 811, 811A, 813 and 813A. The bus stops are next to the entrance to the Main Clinical Block and Trauma Centre.

=== Cars ===
Car parks for patients and visitors are located on the second floor of the Day Treatment Block and Children Wards, and on the ground floor of the staff quarters.

=== Bicycles ===
Several cycling tracks lead to Prince of Wales Hospital, linking it to Tai Wai, Sha Tin, Ma On Shan and Tai Po areas. The hospital provides over 200 bicycle parking spaces, located on the ground floor of:

- Special Block
- Staff Quarters Block C
- Madam S H Ho Hostel for Medical Students
- Boiler Room, Clinical Science Building (Professorial Block)

== Incidents ==
=== Wastage of a donor liver ===
A donor liver for transplant was wasted on 15 June 2002 due to limited resources at the Prince of Wales Hospital, one of the two liver transplant centres in Hong Kong. The management of the hospital had imposed a quota of one liver transplant a month, and decided not to use the liver as the liver transplant team at the hospital had already performed two liver transplants earlier in June. The hospital was criticised for the decision. Queen Mary Hospital, the other liver transplant centre, was also unable to use the liver because it was engaged in another liver transplant.

The incident led to a review of the liver transplant services provided by the Hospital Authority. The result was to centralise liver transplants at Queen Mary Hospital for better allocation of resources and manpower. The liver transplant centre at the Prince of Wales Hospital was officially closed on 5 July 2004.

=== Intrathecal administration of vincristine ===
An oncology trainee erroneously injected a leukaemia patient with the chemotherapy drug, vincristine, via the intrathecal route instead of intravenous on 15 June 2007. The 21-year-old patient died 22 days later.

The patient was prescribed six oral drugs, intrathecal cytarabine and intravenous vincristine by another doctor, and was injected by the trainee later the day. The patient, feeling pain after the erroneous treatment, attended the Department of Accident and Emergency of the hospital on the next day and was admitted to the Department of Clinical Oncology. The error was not confirmed until 20 June 2007.

A special investigation panel, commissioned after the incident, made recommendations to prevent a recurrence of the incident, including establishing procedures on the transportation, storage, packaging and administration of intrathecal drugs.

=== Mis-prescribed medication ===
A 73-year-old woman died on 11 July 2011 after an intern mistakenly gave her five medicines intended for another patient on 9 July 2011.

The woman attended the Accident and Emergency Department of the Prince of Wales Hospital on 8 July due to shortness of breath and was admitted to the medical ward. The admission resident doctor prescribed the patient with her usual medications (including aspirin, calcium carbonate, Lasix and Pantoloc). He wrote this on the patient's medical notes, transcribed her usual medications onto the patient's medication administration record, and then asked the intern to follow up on the management.

An investigation found that the intern perceived that the instruction was to resume the patient's usual medication in addition to those already prescribed on the record. She mistakenly transcribed five medications (including Candesartan, Gliclazide, Metformin, Betaloc and Isordil) intended for another patient onto the record.

=== Gauze retained in women’s bodies ===
Gauze was left in the vaginas of four women who had given birth at the Prince of Wales Hospital in June and July 2012. Three of the women had their episiotomy repair done by an intern in June, and the fourth woman was treated by a resident doctor in July. The problems were noticed when the women went for post-natal check-ups, and the gauze was removed. An investigation found that the intern was at fault for not checking the number of pieces of gauze involved.

After the incidents, the hospital has strengthened the episiotomy repair guidelines, which require the doctor to count the number of pieces of gauze together with a nurse after the procedure, to ensure that no gauze is retained in the patient's body.

== See also ==
- Prince of Wales
- List of hospitals in Hong Kong
