= Tsan Yuk Hospital =

- Hospital Authority
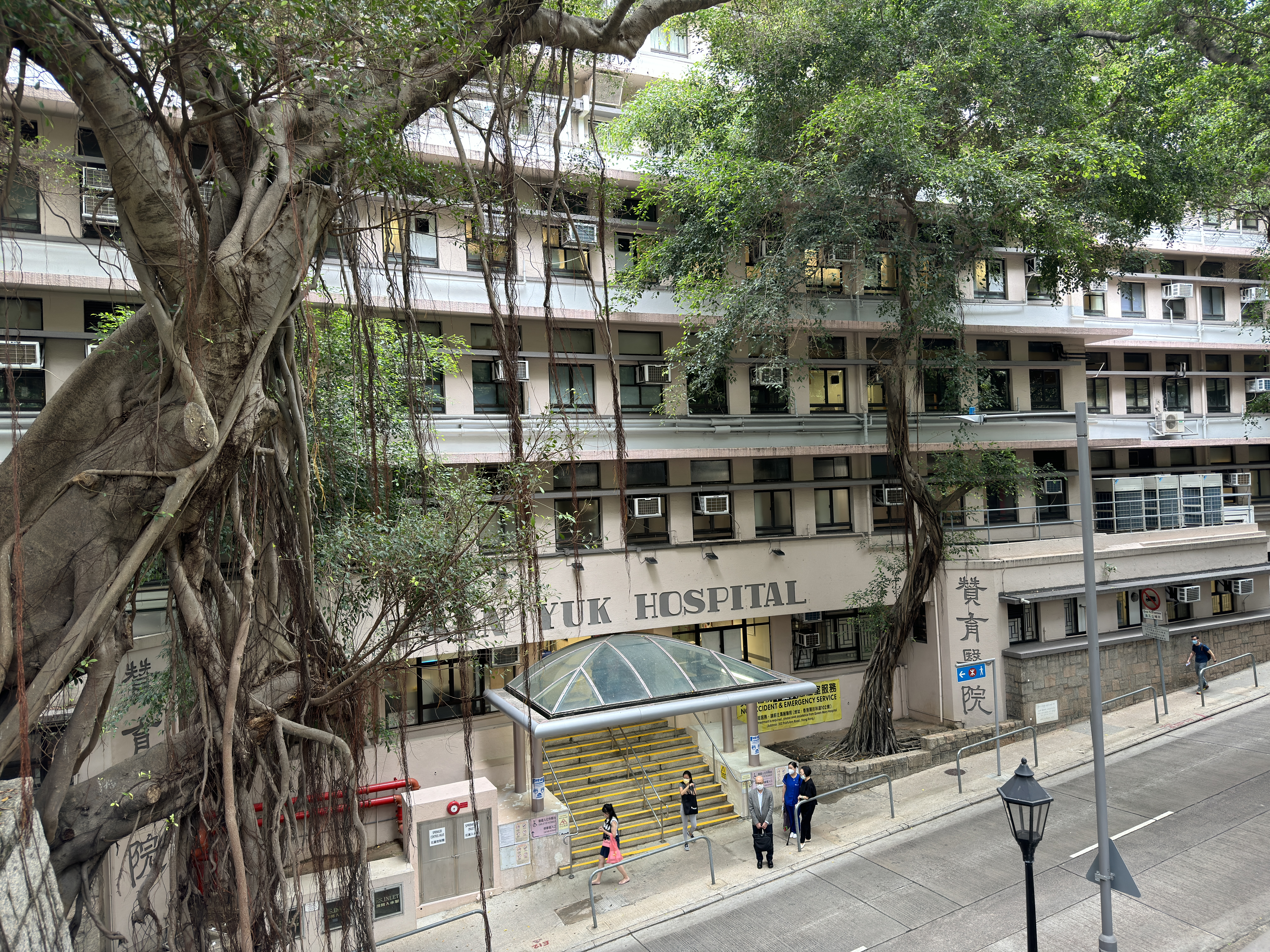

- Location within Hong Kong

Geography
- Location: 30 Hospital Road, Sai Ying Pun, Hong Kong
- Coordinates: 22.286212°N 114.144541°E

Organisation
- Type: Specialist, Teaching
- Affiliated university: Li Ka Shing Faculty of Medicine, University of Hong Kong
- Network: Hong Kong Island Cluster

Services
- Emergency department: No, Accident and Emergency at Queen Mary Hospital
- Beds: 1

History
- Founded: 17 October 1922; 103 years ago

Links
- Lists: Hospitals in Hong Kong

Tsan Yuk Hospital
- Traditional Chinese: 贊育醫院
- Simplified Chinese: 赞育医院
Transcriptions
Standard Mandarin
- Hanyu Pinyin: Zàn Yù Yīyuàn
Yue: Cantonese
- Yale Romanization: Jaanyuhk Yīyún
- Jyutping: Zaan3 juk6 ji1 jyun6*2

Tsan Yuk Hospital (Chinese: 贊育醫院; TYH) is maternity hospital is located on 30 Hospital Road, Sai Ying Pun on Hong Kong Island, is a public hospital in Hong Kong, It was specialising in obstetrics and gynaecology. It also operates as a teaching and training hospital for the medical and nursing students of Li Ka Shing Faculty of Medicine of the University of Hong Kong.

Tsan Yuk Hospital was located at No. 36A Western Street in Sai Ying Pun after the hospital moved to the Hospital Road site in 1955.

== Mission ==
Tsan Yuk Hospital is run under three objectives: In addition to offering a high-standard service, the hospital aims to help women with detected gynaecological abnormalities, and also to provide research and training facilities for doctors, nurses, medical students of the University of Hong Kong and other professionals.

== History ==
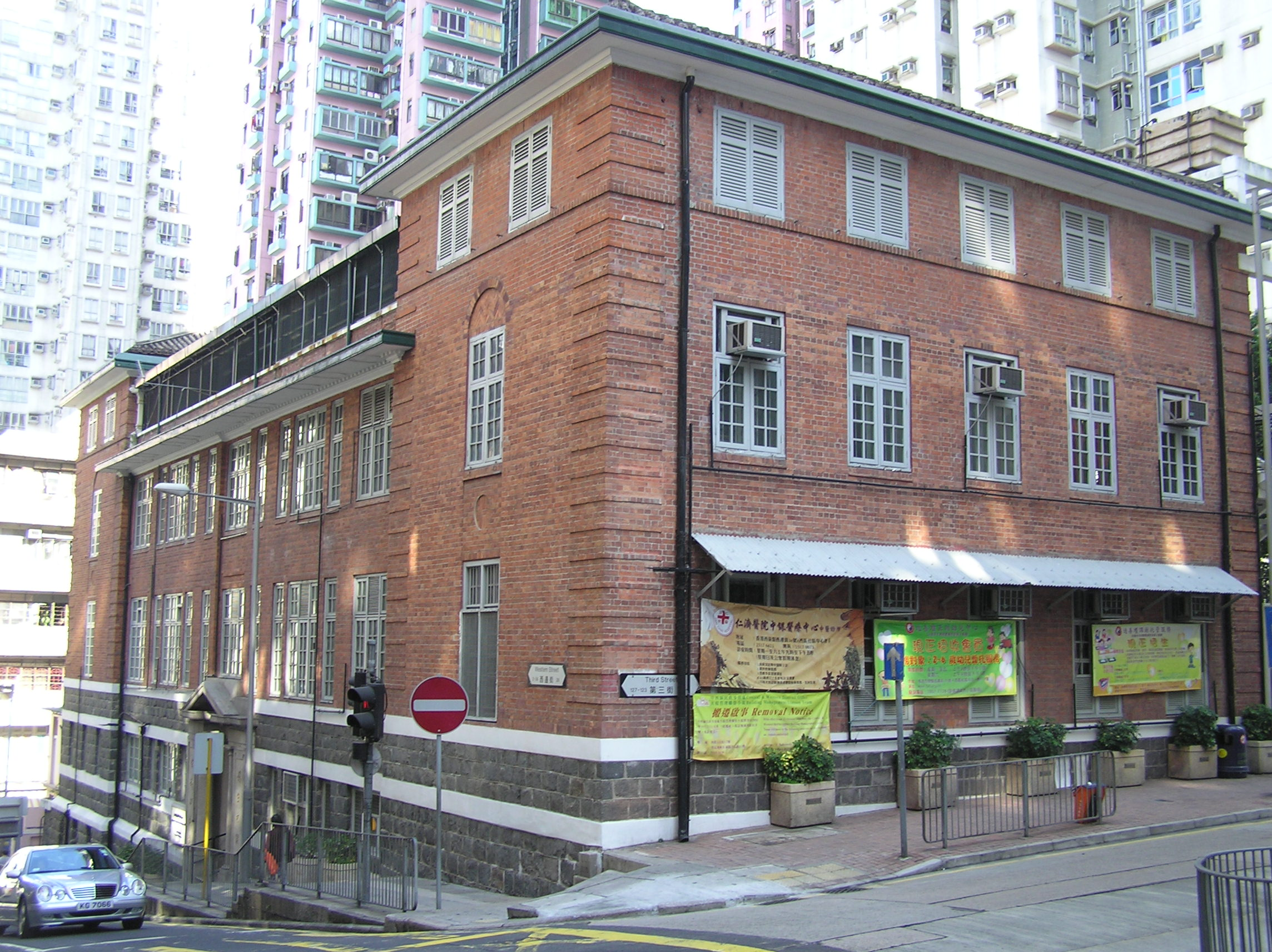
Old Tsan Yuk Hospital building

Tsan Yuk Hospital was originally located at the cross-section of Western Street and Third Street in Hong Kong's Sai Ying Pun area. The land on which the hospital was built was donated by the government and the $94,000 construction fee was donated by Mr. H. M. H. Nemazee, Sai Ying Pun Kai Fong Committee (西營盤街坊會) of the Fishmongers' Guild (魚販商會) and Fruit and Vegetable Sellers' Guild (蔬果販商協會). The thirty beds were donated by Tung Wah Hospital, another government hospital located in neighbouring Sheung Wan.

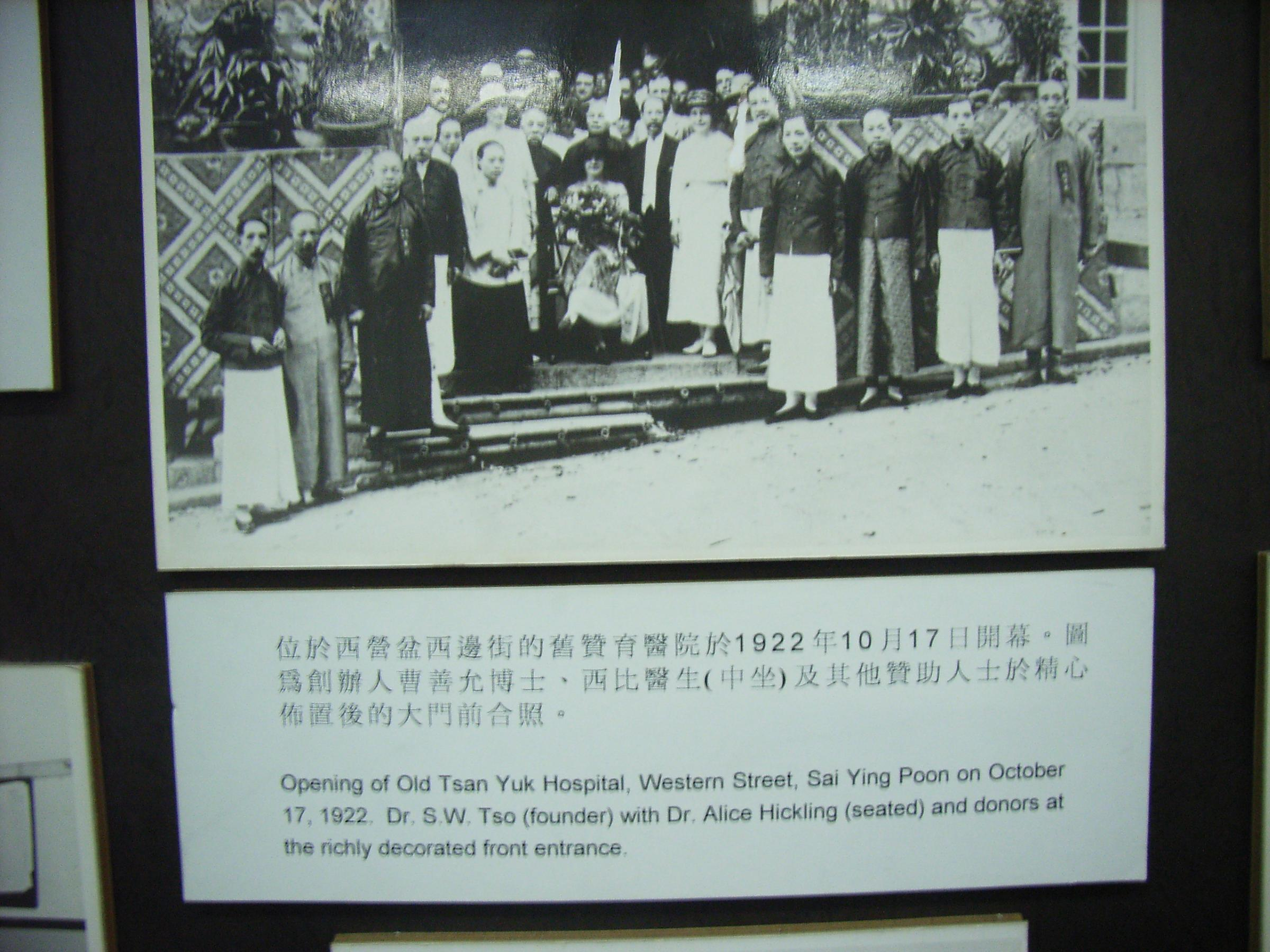
Tsan Yuk Hospital on 17 October 1922 – The Founder and the donors.

The hospital was opened by the English missionary group London Missionary Society on 17 October 1922. It was originally opened as a maternity hospital, with the intention to meet society's increasing demand for neonatal services, including the training of midwives and obstetricians. The London Missionary Society recruited the first foreign female doctor in Hong Kong, Dr. Alice D. Hickling, and appointed her as the director of Tsan Yuk. In her development of obstetric services, she quickly recognised the abundance of women eager to become professional midwives in Hong Kong, and had the notion to provide such training through the hospital. She suggested this to Dr. S. W. Tso (曹善允博士), Chairman of the Chinese Public Dispensary Committee (華人公共診所委員會), and he supported her proposal. Thus forward, Tsan Yuk became one of Hong Kong's foremost maternity teaching hospitals.

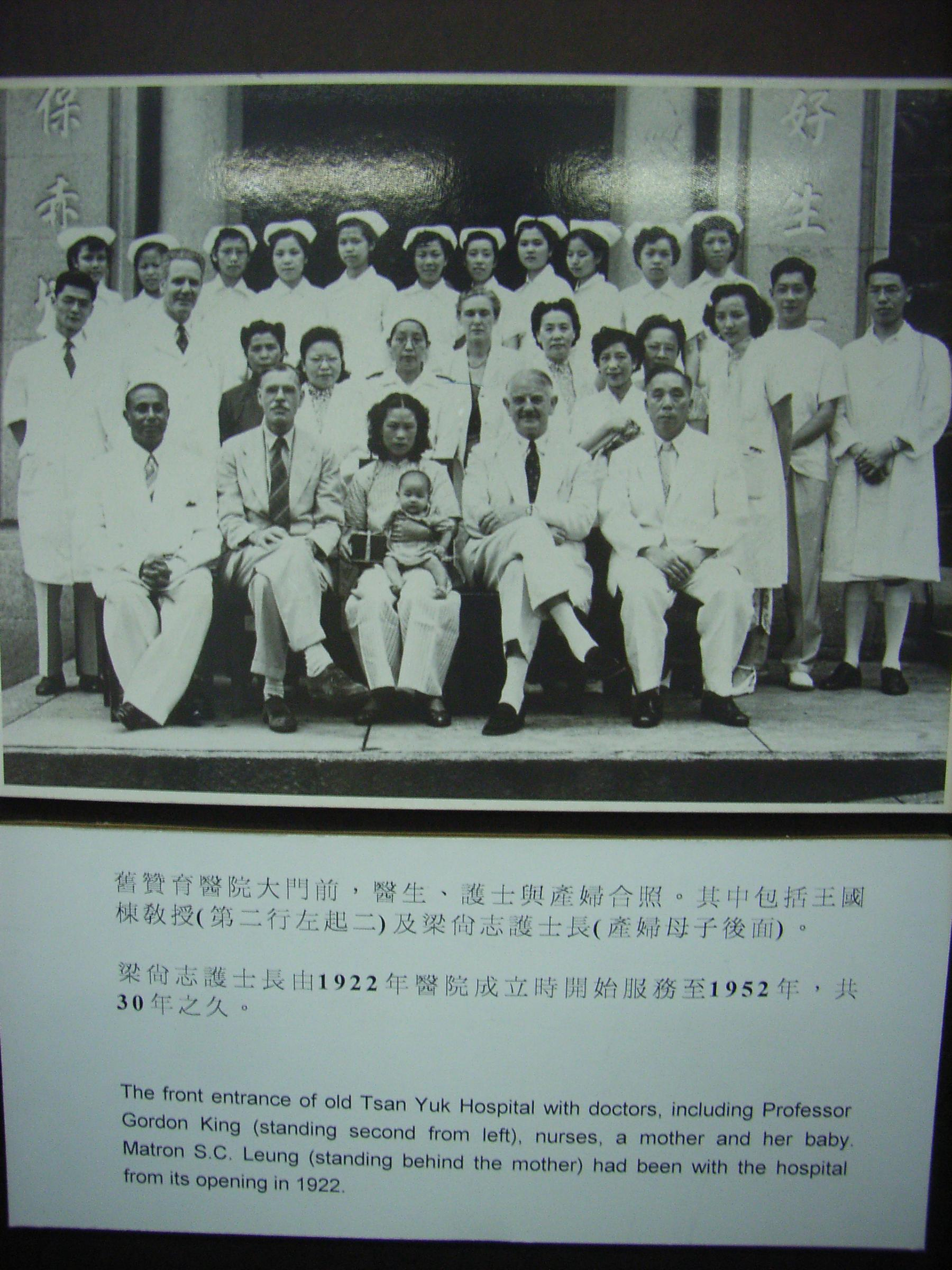
Tsan Yuk Hospital staff (1922)

In 1925, Professor Tottenham was appointed as the first obstetric professor in the University of Hong Kong. Professor Tottenham also recognised Tsan Yuk's potential as an educational hospital for teaching obstetrics and gynecology. In 1937, most of the teaching activities of these fields were transferred to Tsan Yuk Hospital, until the opening of Queen Mary Hospital a few years later. Such teaching endeavours included training for medical students and post-graduates, research facilities for doctors, and obstetric training for student nurses. Tsan Yuk's obstetric professional training was recognised by the Royal College of Obstetricians and Gynecologists.

Tsan Yuk Hospital was closed in 1944, during the Japanese colonial period of Hong Kong, and most of the furniture and equipment was moved to Nethersole Hospital.

By 1955, Tsan Yuk was experiencing bed shortages and limited places for patients. The Hong Kong Jockey Club recognised this problem and donated $3,570,000 to build a new hospital. The chosen site was on nearby Hospital Road, and on 28 October 1952 The Duchess of Kent laid the first foundation for the new hospital. Three years later, on 13 June, Sir Alexander William George Herder Grantham held the opening ceremony for the new Tsan Yuk Hospital.

== New location ==
In 1969, the Mrs Wu Chung Prenatal Diagnostic laboratory was established. Funded by donations from Mrs Wu Chung and the government, the laboratory was set up to screen pregnant women for possible congenital diseases or abnormalities in their babies. It also provides counselling services to women at risk if giving birth to babies with congenital defects.

To ensure that the laboratory's testing procedures and results meet international standards, the centre was enrolled in the Royal College of Pathologists of Australia Quality Assurance Programme in cytogenetics.

During the 1970s, Tsan Yuk experienced the demand for further expansion. and part of the roof was renovated into 19 single rooms, 8 double rooms and a pantry, a living room and an air-conditioned reading room, construction of which was subsidised again by the Hong Kong Jockey Club. In 1975 the hospital set up a place to centralise the modulation of babies' milk products to combat the occurrence of infant gastrointestinal conditions. In March 2000, the Integrated Clinic of Hong Kong West Cluster commenced operation in Tsan Yuk Hospital providing comprehensive and holistic care for patients with stable chronic illnesses. On the first of January 2005, the Clinic was relocated to the Sai Ying Pun Jockey Club Clinic located on Queen's Road West, and renamed Sai Ying Pun Family Medicine Specialist Clinic.

In the interests of quality and cost effectiveness, the obstetric and newborn inpatient services provided by Tsan Yuk were relocated to Queen Mary Hospital in November 2001. Currently, Tsan Yuk Hospital operates as a day centre providing outpatient services. In co-operation with the Maternal Child and Health Centres of the Department of Health, it also provides shared antenatal care for low risk obstetric patients, including ambulatory care. Tsan Yuk Hospital also conducts a variety of health education programmes for their patients, including such areas as care of newborns, dietary requirements of pregnant women, and family planning.

On 1 July 2007, Tsan Yuk Hospital's General Gynaecological Clinic was also moved to Queen Mary Hospital.

=== Lady Helen Woo Women's Diagnostic and Treatment Centre ===
In 1996, the Lady Helen Woo Women's Diagnostic and Treatment Centre was established to provide comprehensive health screening and treatment services for women, including counselling and community education. In line with this mission, a Breast Screening Referral Centre was established in 1999 to provide mammography services to women. The centre has been managed by the University of Hong Kong's Department of Obstetrics & Gynecology since 1 March 2004. Services are provided by a combination of specialists from the university, as well as specialist pathologists and radiologists, radiographers, registered nurses and dieticians. The centre is equipped with a mammography system, an ultrasound machine, coloscopy systems and bone densitometer that measures lumbar and pelvic bone density. It also uses the latest in cervical screening and sexual health technology.

== Scope of services ==
The following services are currently provided at the Specialist Outpatient Clinic under the Department of Obstetrics and Gynaecology:

- Antenatal care
- Postnatal care
- Antenatal talk
- Menopause clinic
- Oral glucose tolerance test clinic
- Urogynaecology clinic

== Incident ==
=== Hong Kong's first "baby mix-up" case ===
In November 2007, Kelvin Li Kwok-yin (Chinese: 李國賢), born on 30 November on 1976 at Tsan Yuk Hospital, was at the centre of Hong Kong's first "baby mix-up case". Mr. Li's sister, a student in nursing, learned that it would have been biologically impossible for their mother of blood type O to give birth to her brother of blood type AB positive. Lee and his parents took DNA tests that confirmed these results of mismatched DNA with his "parents", Lui Fung-ha and Li Wai-keung.

The family was unable to obtain the hospital records, with Tsan Yuk Hospital's maternity services having been relocated to Queen Mary Hospital long ago. After numerous attempts to correspond with related authorities, Li finally met with the Hospital Authority. It refused to check the records due to privacy reasons but agreed to offer DNA tests for the people born on the same day at Tsan Yuk Hospital.

Ensuing media attention prompted two men, both born in the same hospital on the same day as Mr. Li, to come forward and submit to DNA tests. However, the results showed that there were no positive matches between their DNA and that of Mr. Li's mother.

In March 2008, the Authority sent invitation letters to 180 mothers who gave birth at Tsan Yuk Hospital between 28 November and 14 December 1976, to take the DNA tests. 30% of the 180 letters failed to be delivered, and no tangible progress was made in the case.

Chuk Yuen Children's Reception Centre was also a potential lead in solving this case of wrongful identity, where the woman Mr. Li knows as his mother left her baby for a month. The centre closed in 2003 and the files were destroyed. The Social Welfare Department later traced two of the twenty-five children who were of the same age as Mr. Li, had been to Chuk Yuen Children's Reception Centre in December 1976 and had later been adopted, but they might not have been born in Tsan Yuk Hospital. The department sent the letters to invite two adoptive parents concerned to ask their sons to take DNA tests. One of the letters with the wrong address failed to be delivered.

For now, Mr. Li has still not confirmed his true identity.

== See also ==
- List of hospitals in Hong Kong
- List of hospitals in China
