= MacLehose Medical Rehabilitation Centre =

- Hospital Authority
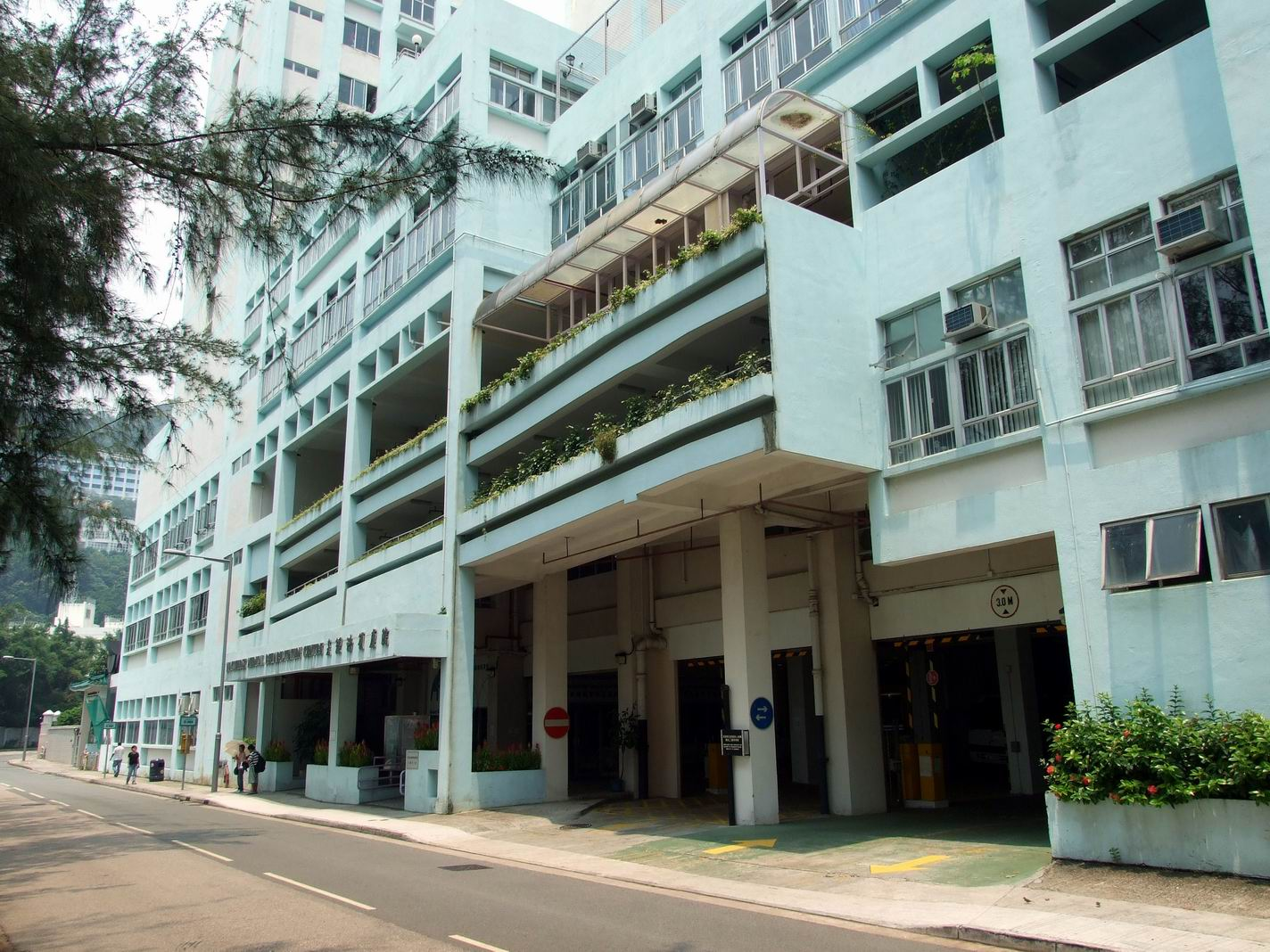

- Location within Hong Kong

Geography
- Location: 7 Sha Wan Drive, Pok Fu Lam, Hong Kong Island, Hong Kong
- Coordinates: 22°16′12″N 114°07′27″E

Organisation
- Type: Specialist, Teaching
- Affiliated university: Li Ka Shing Faculty of Medicine, University of Hong Kong
- Network: Hong Kong Island Cluster

Services
- Emergency department: No Accident & Emergency at Queen Mary Hospital
- Beds: 150

History
- Founded: 7 December 1984

Links
- Website: www.ha.org.hk/mmrc/
- Lists: Hospitals in Hong Kong

MacLehose Medical Rehabilitation Centre (Chinese: 麥理浩康復院; Cantonese Yale: Mahkléihhouh Fuhkhōng Yún; MMRC) is a rehab and long-term care hospital above Sandy Bay in Hong Kong. Founded in 1984 by the Hong Kong Society for Rehabilitation, it has 150 medical rehabilitation beds, including 20 beds for day rehabilitation service. It is affiliated with the Li Ka Shing Faculty of Medicine, the University of Hong Kong, providing clinical attachment opportunities for its medical students.

== History ==
The centre was officially opened on 7 December 1984, named after Murray MacLehose, the former Governor of Hong Kong. Tsang Shiu Tim Home for the Elderly was opened in 2010.
