= Cheshire Home, Chung Hom Kok =

- Hospital Authority
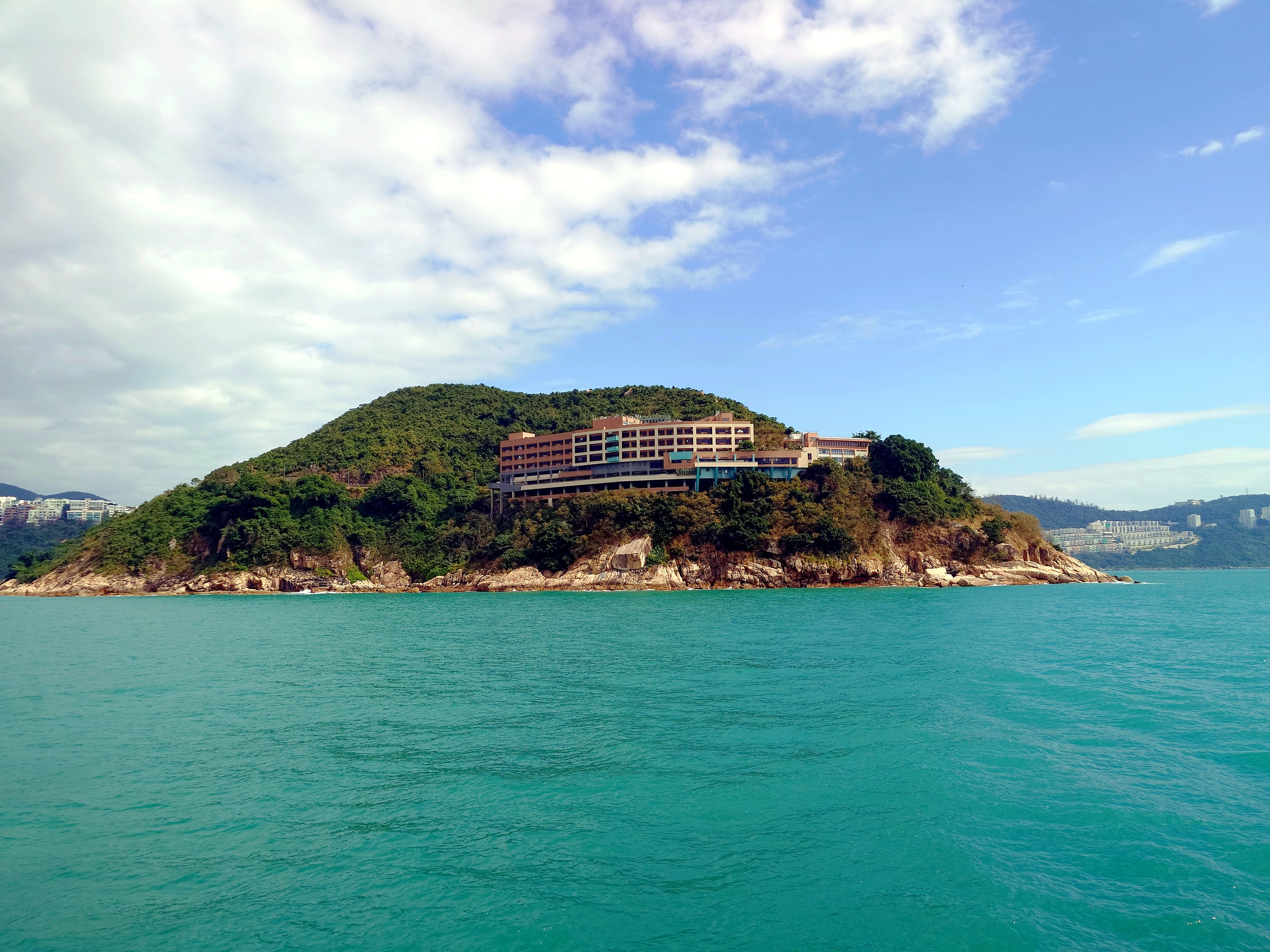
- Cheshire Home, Chung Hom Kok

- Location within Hong Kong

Geography
- Location: 128 Chung Hom Kok Road, Chung Hom Kok, Hong Kong
- Coordinates: 22°12′44″N 114°11′50″E

Organisation
- Type: Specialist
- Network: Hong Kong East Cluster

Services
- Emergency department: No, Emergency Department at Pamela Youde Nethersole Eastern Hospital
- Beds: 240
- Speciality: Extended care

Helipads
- Helipad: No

History
- Founded: 1961

Links
- Lists: Hospitals in Hong Kong

Cheshire Home, Chung Hom Kok (Chinese: 舂磡角慈氏護養院; Cantonese Yale: Jūnghamgok Wuhyéuhngyún, CCH) is a public hospital in Chung Hom Kok, Hong Kong. It provides extended care for patients with physical disabilities and chronic illnesses. It is under the Hong Kong East Cluster managed by the Hospital Authority.

== History ==
The Cheshire Home in Chung Hom Kok is one of The Cheshire Foundation Homes for the Sick in many countries, and is the first in Hong Kong. It was set up by Lieutenant Colonel Nigel Watson after he visited Hong Kong in June 1961 and noticed the need for such homes in the colony. The Cheshire Foundation Homes for the Sick were started in 1948 as a mission for the relief of suffering all over the world, after Group Captain Leonard Cheshire, a British Royal Air Force pilot during the Second World War and recipient of the Victoria Cross.

The Cheshire Home in Chung Hom Kok was opened in October 1961, established at the site of the former Royal Artillery camp, granted by the Government of Hong Kong. Patients were accommodated in the headquarters building formerly occupied by the gunners, and staff quarters were situated in the adjacent Nissen huts. The gun site was built between 1938 and 1940; and the guns were put out of action before being abandoned during the Japanese invasion in December 1941.

== Services ==
As of March 2013, the home had 240 beds and around 180 members of staff.
