= Pamela Youde Nethersole Eastern Hospital =

- Hospital Authority and Alice Ho Miu Ling Nethersole Charity Foundation
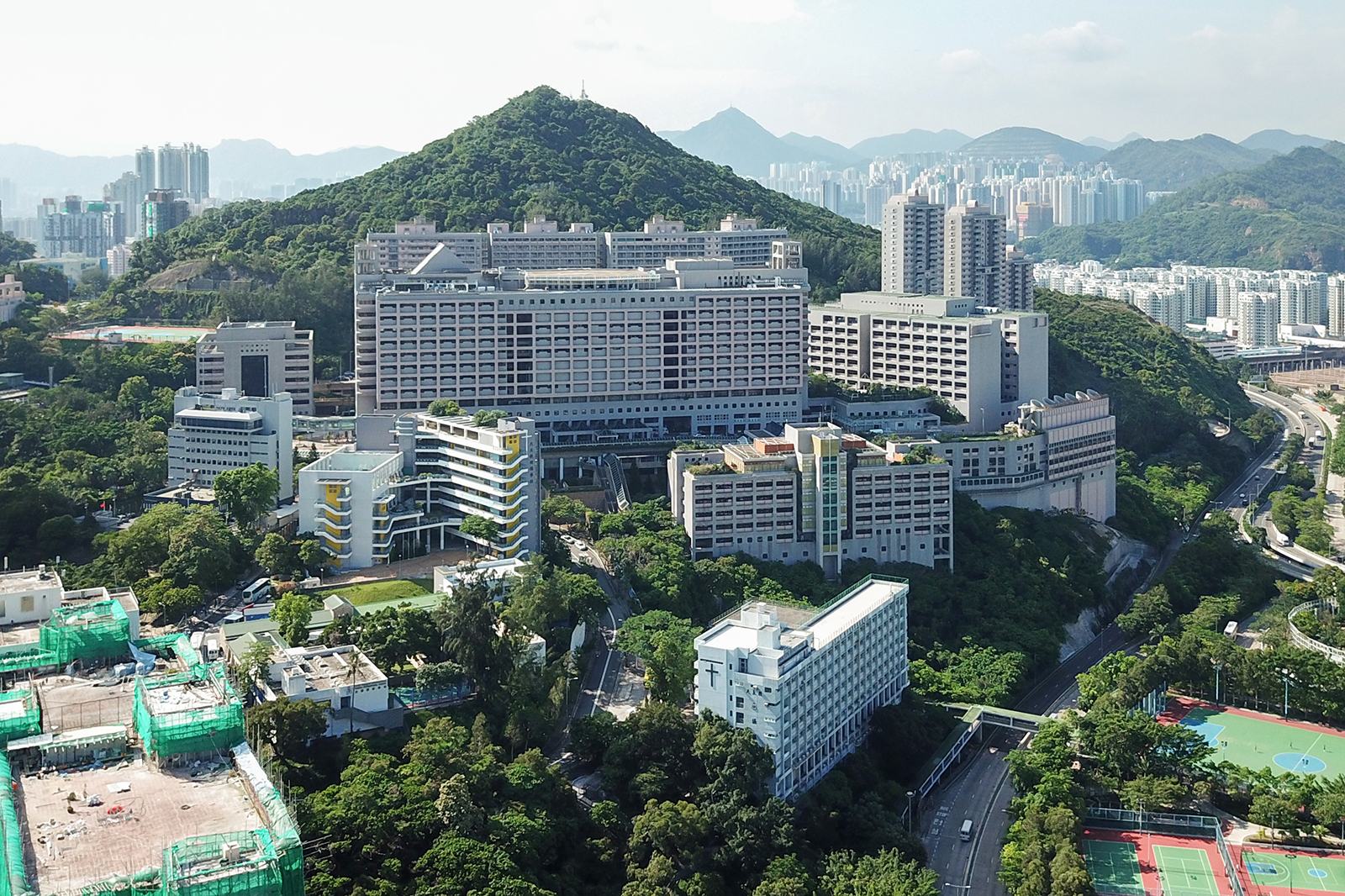
- Main Block in June 2018

- Location within Hong Kong

Geography
- Location: 3 Lok Man Road, Chai Wan, Hong Kong Island, Hong Kong
- Coordinates: 22°16′10″N 114°14′11″E

Organisation
- Type: District General, Teaching
- Religious affiliation: Christian
- Affiliated university: Li Ka Shing Faculty of Medicine, University of Hong Kong and Faculty of Medicine, Chinese University of Hong Kong
- Network: Hong Kong Island Cluster

Services
- Emergency department: Yes, 24 hour Accident and Emergency and Emergency Radiation Therapy Center
- Beds: 1,633

Helipads
- Helipad: Yes

History
- Founded: 15 October 1993; 32 years ago

Links
- Website: www.ha.org.hk/pyneh
- Lists: Hospitals in Hong Kong

Pamela Youde Nethersole Eastern Hospital
- Traditional Chinese: 東區尤德夫人那打素醫院
- Simplified Chinese: 东区尤德夫人那打素医院
- Cantonese Yale: Dūngkēui Yàuhdāk fūyàhn Nàhdásou yīyún
- Literal meaning: Eastern District Mrs. Youde Nethersole Hospital
Transcriptions
Standard Mandarin
- Hanyu Pinyin: Dōngqū Yóudé fūren Nàdǎsù yīyuàn
- Wade–Giles: Tung^{1}-chü^{1} Yu^{2}-to^{2} fu^{1}-jên^{2} Na^{4}-ta^{3}-su^{4} i^{1}-yüen^{4}
- IPA: [tʊ́ŋ.tɕʰý jǒʊ.tɤ̌ fú.ɻə̌n nâ.tà.sû í.ɥɛ̂n]
Yue: Cantonese
- Yale Romanization: Dūngkēui Yàuhdāk fūyàhn Nàhdásou yīyún
- Jyutping: dung1 koei1 jau4 dak1 fu1 jan4 naa4 daa2 sou3 ji1 jyun2
- IPA: [tʊŋ˥.kʰɵɥ˥ jɐw˩.tɐk̚˥ fu˥.jɐn˩ na˩.ta˧˥.sɔw˧ ji˥.]

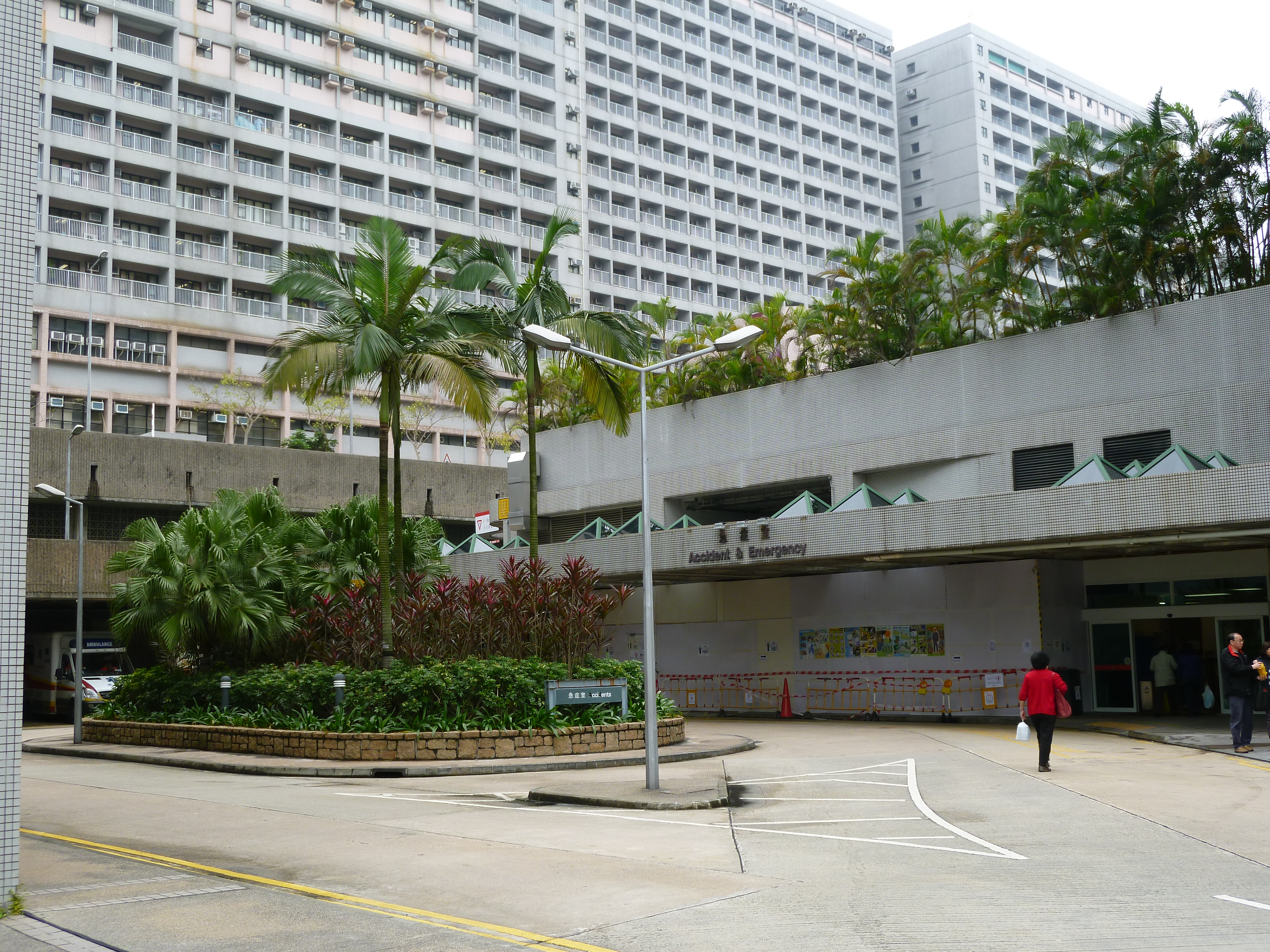
Accident and Emergency entrance of the Pamela Youde Nethersole Eastern Hospital in March 2012

Pamela Youde Nethersole Eastern Hospital (Chinese: 東區尤德夫人那打素醫院; PYNEH), known as Eastern Hospital or Youde Hospital, is an acute district general hospital in Chai Wan, Hong Kong. The hospital houses one of two Emergency Radiation Therapy Centers in Hong Kong, with the other situated at Tuen Mun Hospital.

Pamela Youde Nethersole Eastern Hospital was opened on 15 October 1993 with 1829 beds and staff of over 3000. It replaced the original Alice Ho Miu Ling Nethersole Hospital in Mid-Levels in Hong Kong Island and moved to Chai Wan. Assigned to the Hong Kong eastern hospital cluster and replaced the other Nethersole hospital, which relocated to the New Territories.

It is affiliated with the Li Ka Shing Faculty of Medicine, the University of Hong Kong, providing clinical attachment opportunities for its medical students.

== History ==
Before the establishment of the Pamela Youde Nethersole Eastern Hospital, there were only three government health centres in Chai Wan. The nearest public hospital, Tang Shiu Kin Hospital in Wan Chai, only had a small emergency department. As the number of critically ill patients exceeded its capacity through the 1960s to 80s, patients had to be rushed to Queen Mary Hospital or elsewhere for urgent treatment.

The Eastern District had a population of 440,000 in the 1980s. In August 1982, several churches in the district formed an organisation to lobby the government to establish a hospital there.

After the sudden death of Governor Edward Youde in 1986, the Eastern District Board in February 1987 formally endorsed a proposal to name the new hospital after Lady Youde. The Pamela Youde Nethersole Eastern Hospital commenced services on 15 October 1993. It was officially opened by Governor Chris Patten on 23 June 1994. When the Pamela Youde Nethersole Eastern Hospital opened, the accident and emergency unit of the Chai Wan Health Centre moved to the new complex.

The Hospital Authority plans to expand the hospital onto the site of the Chai Wan Laundry, which will be relocated to a proposed Supporting Services Centre in Tin Shui Wai New Town.

== Services ==
Pamela Youde Nethersole Eastern Hospital is the only hospital in Hong Kong which houses a pressure chamber to provide Hyperbaric Oxygen Therapy (HBOT) service, which can be used to treat conditions such as air or gas embolism, carbon monoxide poisoning, central retinal artery occlusion (CRAO), decompression sickness, etc.

The hospital is the only hospital with a helipad on Hong Kong Island, and one of the two hospitals in Hong Kong (Pamela Youde Nethersole Eastern Hospital and Tuen Mun Hospital). It receives emergency patients transferred by Government Flying Services. It also provides emergency medical consultation to remote island clinics (e.g. St. John Hospital in Cheung Chau).

Pamela Youde Nethersole Eastern Hospital is one of two hospitals (the other being Tuen Mun Hospital) equipped with dedicated Emergency Radiation Treatment Centres (ERTCs), provided in response to concerns surrounding the 1993-1994 commissioning of the Daya Bay Nuclear Power Plant in nearby Shenzhen. Under the Hong Kong government's Daya Bay Contingency Plan, the two centres will treat and decontaminate persons affected by a nuclear accident.

As of March 2013, the hospital has 1,633 beds and around 4,993 full-time equivalent members of staff. For the year ended 31 March 2014, it has treated 152,332 patients in the Accidental and Emergency Department, 138,724 inpatients and day-patients, 560,842 specialist outpatients, and 393,573 general outpatients.

=== Clinical departments ===
- 24 hours Accident and Emergency department
- Anaesthesia
- Clinical oncology
- Clinical pathology
- Otorhinolaryngology (ENT)
- Intensive Care Unit (ICU)
- Medicine
- Neurosurgery
- Nuclear medicine
- Obstetrics & gynaecology
- Orthopaedics & Traumatology
- Ophthalmology (Eye)
- Paediatrics
- Psychiatry
- Radiology
- Surgery

=== Allied health departments ===
Allied health professions are health care professions distinct from nursing, medicine, and pharmacy.

- Chaplaincy
- Clinical psychology
- Community & patient resources
- Dietetics
- Medical physics
- Medical social work
- Occupational therapy (OT)
- Physiotherapy
- Podiatry
- Hyperbaric Oxygen Therapy
- Prosthetic and orthotic
- Speech therapy
- Emergency Radiation Therapy Center
