= Tang Shiu-kin =

Hong Kong entrepreneur (1901–1986)

Sir Shiu-kin Tang CBE, KStJ, JP
- Born: 21 March 1901; British Hong Kong
- Died: 19 June 1986 (aged 85); Hong Kong Sanatorium & Hospital, Happy Valley, Wan Chai, Hong Kong
- Occupation: Philanthropist

Tang Shiu-kin
- Traditional Chinese: 鄧肇堅
Transcriptions
Yue: Cantonese
- Jyutping: dang6 siu6 gin1

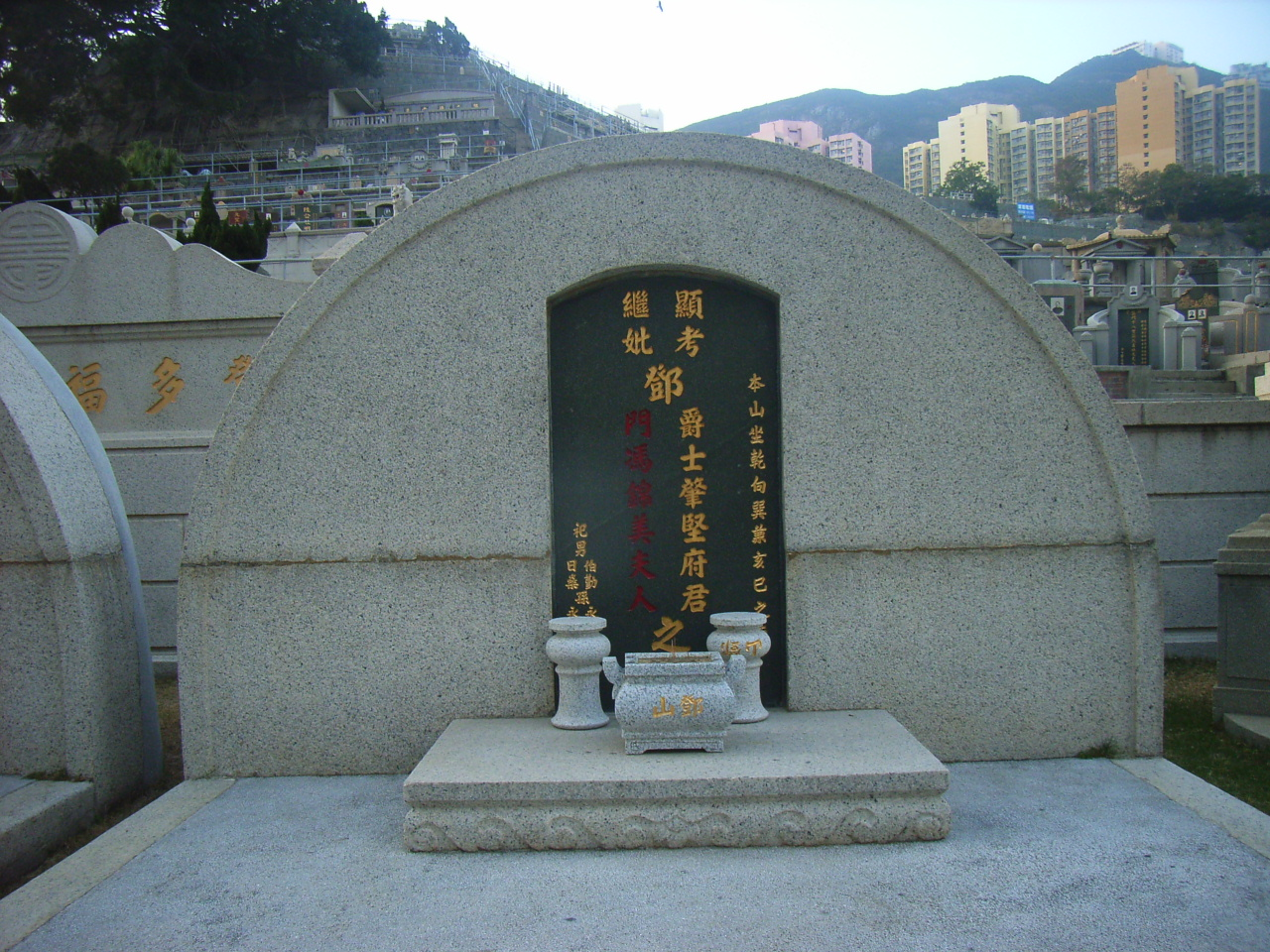
Grave of Tang Shiu Kin in Hong Kong

Sir Shiu-kin Tang CBE, KStJ, JP (Chinese: 鄧肇堅; 21 March 1901 – 19 June 1986) was a Hong Kong entrepreneur and philanthropist. In 1933, he co-founded Kowloon Motor Bus and is known through the public service institutions he funded and founded in Hong Kong, many of which bear his name.

He served as chairman of both Tung Wah Group of Hospitals and Po Leung Kuk.

== Early life and the Battle of Hong Kong ==
Tang was born in Hong Kong into a wealthy family. His father was Tang Chi Ngong JP, a banker. His mother Cheung Shun-wan was fourth wife and he was the second of four brothers. He attended Queen's College and St. Stephen's College.

During the Battle of Hong Kong, Tang Shiu-kin was almost killed by Japanese forces in Happy Valley on 23 December 1941, two days before the fall of the territory. He, along with two other businessmen, was drafted to serve on the Hong Kong reserve police force and found in possession of helmets and trench coats. Along with other civilians and Nationalist Chinese officials, he was bayonetted by the soldiers and dumped into a drainage ditch.

== Philanthropy ==
It is estimated that in his lifetime Tang contributed at least HK$100 million (amounts at that time) for worthy causes.

== Family ==
Tang's eldest grandson, born to the only son of his 'first concubine', was David Tang, founder of the Shanghai Tang fashion chain, though Tang Shui Kin early on ejected the whole family with very little financial support, according to David Tang.

== See also ==
- Tang Shiu Kin Hospital
- Sai Kung Tang Shiu Kin Sports Ground
- Tuen Mun Tang Shiu Kin Sports Ground
- Tang Shiu Kin Victoria Government Secondary School
- Sheng Kung Hui Tang Shiu Kin Secondary School
