= St. John Hospital (Hong Kong) =

- Hospital Authority and Hong Kong St. John Ambulance
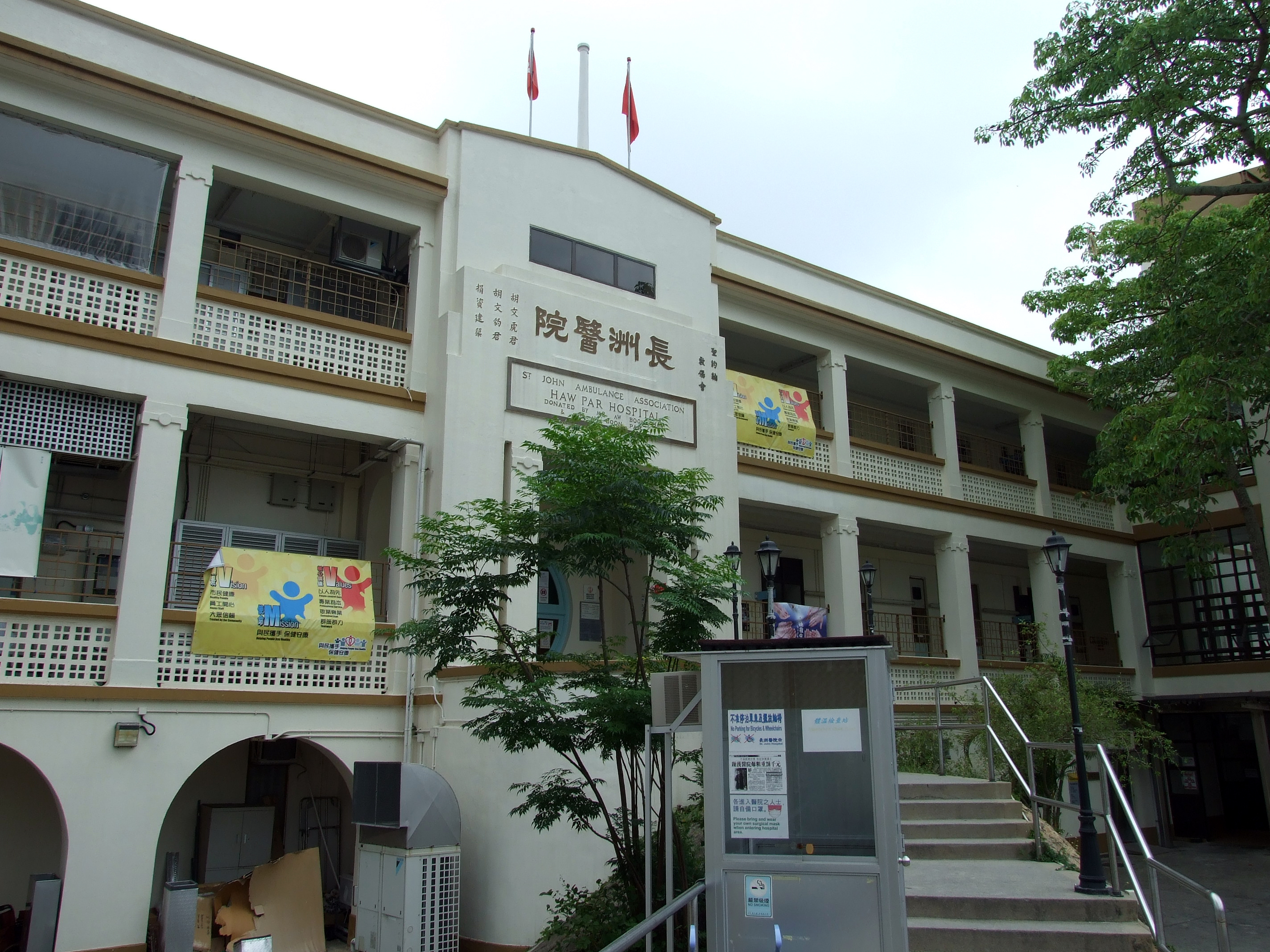

- Location within Hong Kong

Geography
- Location: Cheung Chau Hospital Road, Tung Wan, Cheung Chau, Hong Kong
- Coordinates: 22°12′29″N 114°01′53″E

Organisation
- Care system: Public, Charitable
- Type: Community
- Patron: Aw Boon Haw and Aw Boon Par
- Network: Hong Kong East Cluster

Services
- Emergency department: Yes, Accident and Emergency, but serious patients will be sent to Pamela Youde Nethersole Eastern Hospital
- Beds: 87

History
- Founded: 21 November 1934; 91 years ago

Links
- Lists: Hospitals in Hong Kong

Hong Kong Graded Building – Grade III
- Designated: 22 January 2010; 16 years ago
- Reference no.: 611

St. John Hospital
- Traditional Chinese: 長洲醫院
- Simplified Chinese: 长洲医院
- Literal meaning: Cheung Chau Hospital
- Hanyu Pinyin: Chángzhōu Yīyuàn
- Yale Romanization: Chèuhngjāu Yīyún
- Jyutping: Coeng^{4} zau^{1} Ji^{1} jyun^{2}

St. John Hospital (Chinese: 長洲醫院; lit. 'Cheung Chau Hospital'; SJH) is a community hospital on the island of Cheung Chau, Hong Kong. It provides primary, emergency, and community health services.

== History ==
St. John Hospital was founded as a tuberculosis sanatorium in November 1934 by the Hong Kong St. John Ambulance Association as the St. John Ambulance Association Haw Par Hospital, named after its donors: tycoon brothers Aw Boon Haw and Aw Boon Par. The foundation stone of the Victorian-style hospital was laid by the two businessmen in 1932. The name "Haw Par Hospital" remains visible at the hospital's entrance, despite it being known now as St. John Hospital.

Before the opening of the St. John Hospital, residents of Cheung Chau sought medical care from The Cheung Chau Fong Bin Hospital, which offered traditional Chinese medicine. Since the closure of the Fong Bin Hospital in 1988, St. John Hospital has been the island's sole hospital.

The hospital has been listed as a Grade III historic building since 22 January 2010.

== Facilities ==
As at March 2013, the hospital has 87 beds and 113 full-time equivalent staff.

The hospital provides services for about 12,000 residents of Cheung Chau. Those services include:

- 24-Hour Accident and Emergency Service
- Specialties
  - Medicine
  - Chest
  - Maternal and Child Health
  - Family Planning
- Others
  - Methadone Detoxification Clinic
  - Physiotherapy
  - X-ray
  - Occupational Therapy
  - Chaplaincy
  - Dietetic
  - Courtesy Transportation for Selected Patients
