= Tang Shiu Kin Hospital =

- Hospital Authority
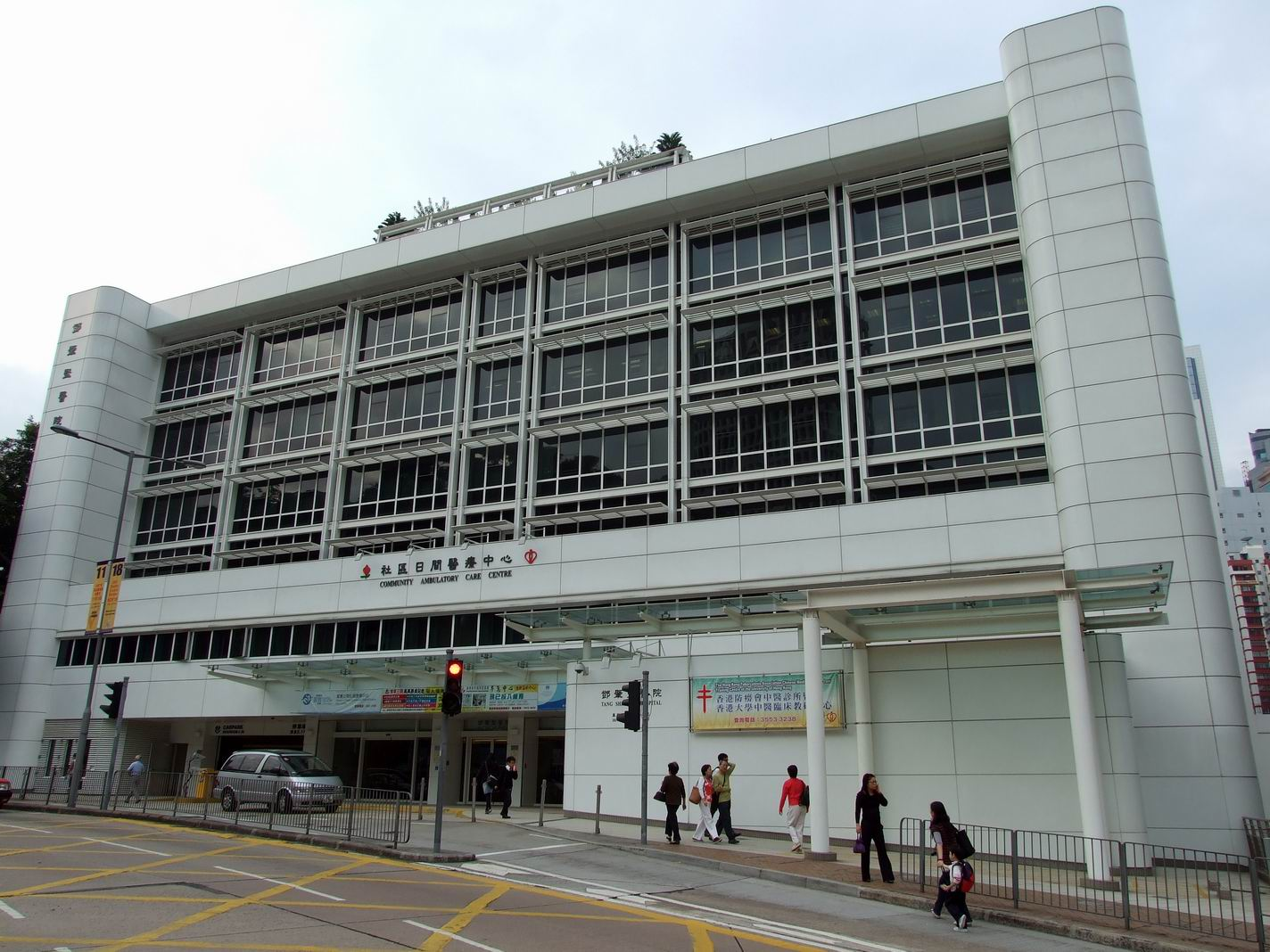
- Tang Shiu Kin Hospital Community Ambulatory Care Centre

- Location within Hong Kong

Geography
- Location: 282 Queen's Road East, Wan Chai, Hong Kong Island, Hong Kong
- Coordinates: 22°16′31″N 114°10′40″E

Organisation
- Type: Specialist
- Patron: Tang Shiu Kin
- Network: Hong Kong Island Cluster

Services
- Emergency department: No (Accident & Emergency at Ruttonjee Hospital)

History
- Founded: 1969; 57 years ago

Links
- Lists: Hospitals in Hong Kong

Tang Shiu Kin Hospital (Chinese: 鄧肇堅醫院; Cantonese Yale: Dahngsiuhgīn Yīyún; TSKH) is a community hospital on Morrison Hill in Wan Chai on Hong Kong Island in Hong Kong. It was opened in 1969 to replace the Eastern Public Dispensary and other clinics on Hong Kong Island.

The hospital merged administratively and operationally with Ruttonjee Hospital in 1998 to form one hospital and is a critical centre for emergency and vehicular accidents. Both names are kept.

It was named after its benefactor, the late Sir Tang Shiu-kin, a Hong Kong philanthropist.

The Hong Kong Government and the Hospital Authority had approved a project to remodel the Tang Shiu Kin Hospital into a community ambulatory care centre. The remodelling project commenced in December 2002 and the new building was handed over to the hospital management on 1 April 2005. The centre houses a Traditional Chinese Medicine Clinic, A&E Training Centre, Family Medicine Training Centre, Integrated Clinic, Staff Clinic, Community Nursing Service, Pharmacy, Integrated Palliative Day Care Centre, Violet Peel General Outpatient Clinic, Wellness in Action and Allied Health Departments including Physiotherapy and Occupational Therapy.

Formerly, some of the departments now parts of TSKH were located in Southorn Centre above Wan Chai MTR station, but had been moved to TSKH since the hospital converted into a Community Ambulatory Care Centre, such as the Violet Peel General Out-patient Clinic.
