= Fung Hong =

Dr. Fung Hong was the former Cluster Chief Executive of the New Territories East Cluster of the Hospital Authority before he retired in 2013.

== Biography ==
Dr. Fung Hong was born in 1957. He received secondary school education at the Diocesan Boys' School and the United World College in the US.

He graduated from the Faculty of Medicine of the University of Hong Kong in 1981. Dr. Ko Wing-man, the Secretary for Food and Health of Hong Kong, and Prof. Yuen Kwok-yung, Chair of Infectious Diseases, Department of Microbiology, University of Hong Kong were among his peers. After graduation, he underwent specialist training in surgery at the Princess Margaret Hospital.

In 1989, Dr. Fung Hong was transferred to the Hospital Services Department to take up an assistant director's post in planning and development. He joined the Hospital Authority in 1991 and later became the Director (Professional Services & Planning). In 2002, he became the Cluster Chief Executive of the New Territories East Cluster and Hospital Chief Executive of the Prince of Wales Hospital. He held the positions until he retired in 2013.

== SARS experience ==
SARS broke out in Hong Kong in 2003. At that time, Fung Hong had just taken up his new post at the Prince of Wales Hospital for four months. He fell sick in late March and was hospitalised on 1 April and diagnosed with SARS. He recovered and resumed duty three months later and was tasked with the responsibility of co-ordinating supplies for the Hospital Authority in the latter phase of SARS. After the pandemic, Fung Hong founded the SARS Mutual Help Association. He also resumed running training and finished the full marathon race of the Standard Chartered Marathon in 2004. However, because of an eye problem, he was forced to give up running full marathon. Fung Hong is also a keen Er Hu player. He founded the Hospital Authority Chinese Orchestra which mainly performs for patients and charity events. In 2010, the Hong Kong Arts Development Council presented the orchestra with the silver award for arts promotion.

Fung Hong will retire from the Hospital Authority in 2013. His will be succeeded by Dr. Hung Chi-tim, Cluster Chief Executive of the Kowloon Central Cluster.

== Controversy ==
=== The Incident of Corpse Mix-up ===
On 11 April 2007, the Prince of Wales Hospital was found to have mixed up the bodies of two deceased patients on 29 March. According to the investigation report, the incident was caused by the non-compliance of a mortuary attendant with the stipulated guidelines in cross checking the identity of the bodies. Fung Hong said there were other contributing factors, such as overcrowding of the mortuary leading to double occupancy of a compartment. Improvements made after the incident included implementation of bar-coding system and increase in mortuary capacity.
