= Queen Mary Hospital (Hong Kong) =

- Hospital Authority

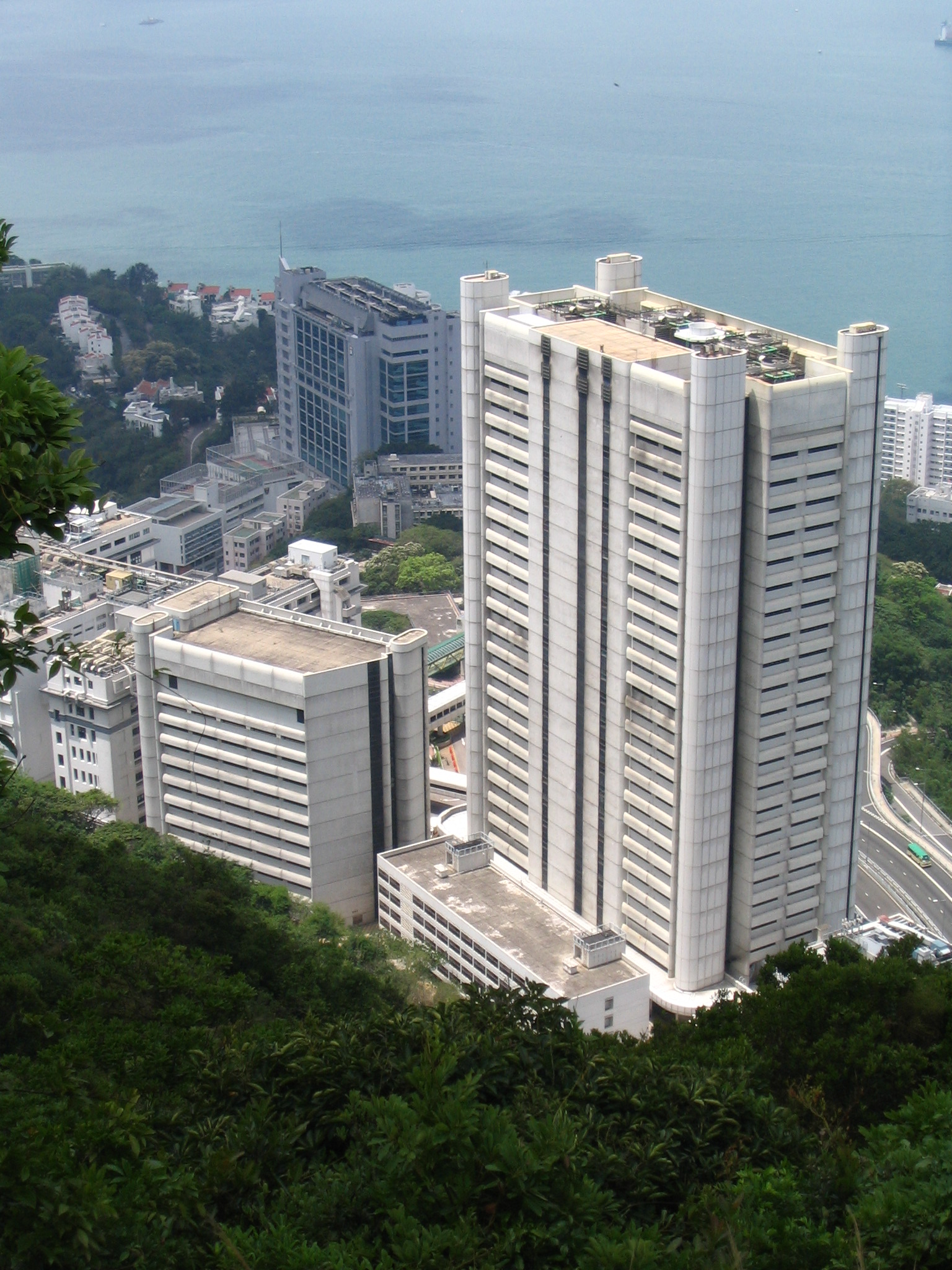
- Queen Mary Hospital, viewed from Hong Kong Trail, High West

- Location within Hong Kong

Geography
- Location: 102 Pok Fu Lam Road, Pok Fu Lam, Hong Kong Island, Hong Kong
- Coordinates: 22°16′12″N 114°07′52″E

Organisation
- Care system: Public
- Type: District General, Teaching
- Affiliated university: Faculty of Dentistry & Li Ka Shing Faculty of Medicine, University of Hong Kong
- Patron: Mary of Teck
- Network: Hong Kong Island Cluster

Services
- Emergency department: Yes, accident and emergency and trauma centre
- Beds: 1,711

Helipads
- Helipad: No

History
- Founded: 13 April 1937; 89 years ago

Links
- Website: www.ha.org.hk/qmh/

Hong Kong Graded Building – Grade III
- Designated: 22 January 2010; 16 years ago
- Reference no.: 591

Queen Mary Hospital
- Traditional Chinese: 瑪麗醫院
- Simplified Chinese: 玛丽医院
- Literal meaning: Mary Hospital
Transcriptions
Standard Mandarin
- Hanyu Pinyin: Mǎlì Yīyuàn
Yue: Cantonese
- Yale Romanization: Máh laih yī yún
- Jyutping: Maa5 lai6 ji1 jyun2
- IPA: [ma˩˧.lɐj˨ ji˥.jyn˧˥]

The Queen Mary Hospital (Chinese: 瑪麗醫院; QMH) is a public district general hospital in Hong Kong. It is the largest hospital on Hong Kong Island at 1,711 beds, and is also a teaching hospital affiliated with the dental and medical schools of the University of Hong Kong. The hospital serves residents of the Western and Southern districts and is a tertiary referral centre for the whole of Hong Kong and beyond. It first opened on 13 April 1937 and is named for Mary of Teck, the queen consort of King George V of the UK.

== History ==
Queen Mary Hospital had its foundation stone laid on 10 May 1935 by the governor of Hong Kong, William Peel, and was officially opened on 13 April 1937 by Andrew Caldecott, governor of Hong Kong. The hospital was named for Mary of Teck, the widowed queen consort of King George V of the United Kingdom. It then replaced the Government Civil Hospital as the main accident and emergency hospital for Hong Kong Island. The hospital was greatly expanded over the years, with two major expansion projects completed in 1955 and 1983, the second being designed by London-based architects, Llewelyn Davies.

== Buildings ==
Queen Mary Hospital's main ward tower, Block K, is one of the tallest hospital buildings in Asia at 137 metres (449 ft) (28 storeys).

The Main Block (Wing A to E) is listed as a Grade III historic building. The Nurses Quarters is listed as a Grade II historic building.

== Facilities ==
As of 31 March 2019, the hospital has 1,711 beds.

== Services ==
- Accident and emergency
- Trauma centre
- Anaesthesiology
- Clinical Oncology
- Cardiothoracic Anaesthesiology
- Cardiothoracic Surgery
- Ear, Nose & Throat
- Microbiology
- Neurosurgery
- Obstetrics & Gynaecology
- Oral Maxillo-facial Surgery & Dental Surgery
- Ophthalmology
- Orthopaedics & Traumatology
- Paediatrics & Adolescent Medicine
- Paediatric Cardiology
- Pathology & Clinical Biochemistry
- Psychiatry
- Radiology
- Surgery
- Clinical Psychology
- Dietetics
- Medical Social Work
- Occupational Therapy
- Pharmacy
- Physiotherapy
- Prosthetics and Orthotics
- Podiatry
- Speech Therapy

As of 2016, Macau healthcare authorities sent patients to Queen Mary Hospital in instances where the local Macau hospitals are not equipped to deal with their scenarios.

=== Treatments ===
In anti-leukaemic treatment, it used oral arsenic trioxide.
