= Hospital Authority =

Statutory body in Hong Kong

- 醫院管理局
- Abbreviation: HA
- Established: 1 December 1990; 35 years ago
- Legal status: Statutory body
- Headquarters: Hospital Authority Building, 147B Argyle Street, Kowloon, Hong Kong
- Coordinates: 22.3244°N 114.1833°E
- Region served: Hong Kong
- Chairman: Henry Fan
- Chief Executive: Ko Pat-sing, Tony
- Budget: HK$47.2 billion (2013–2014); HK$45.5 billion (2012–2013)
- Staff: 67,000
- Website: www.ha.org.hk

Hospital Authority
- Traditional Chinese: 醫院管理局
- Simplified Chinese: 医院管理局
Transcriptions
Standard Mandarin
- Hanyu Pinyin: Yīyuàn Guǎnlǐ Jú
Yue: Cantonese
- Yale Romanization: Yī yún gún léih guhk
- Jyutping: Ji^{1} jyun^{2} gun^{2} lei^{5} guk^{6}

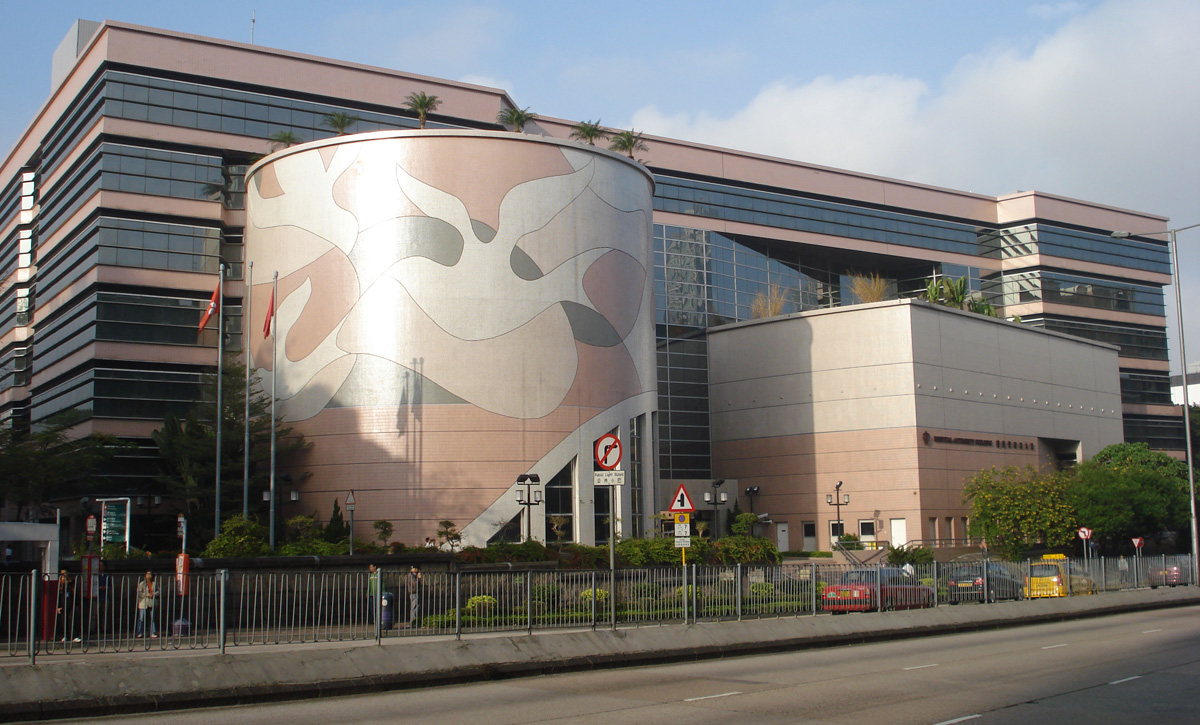
Hospital Authority Head Office in Kowloon.

The Hospital Authority (HA) is a statutory body managing all the government hospitals and institutes in Hong Kong. It is under the governance of its board and is under the monitor of the Secretary for Health of the Hong Kong Government. Its chairman is Henry Fan.

== History ==
Before the establishment of the Hospital Authority, all health and medical issues were under the management of the Medical and Health Department. In 1990, a new health administration system was introduced as part of the 1989 reforms. The establishment of the Authority served to rebuild state capacity amid the emergence of party politics in Hong Kong. The department became the Department of Health and in 1991, the management of all the public hospitals was passed to a new statutory body, the Hospital Authority, which was established on 1 December 1990 under the Hospital Authority Ordinance. In 2003, the General Outpatient Clinics of Department of Health were transferred to the authority.

== Hospital clusters ==
Hospital Authority has been providing services to the public under a cluster-based structure since 1993. It currently manages 44 public hospitals and institutions, 49 specialist outpatient clinics (SOPC) and 75 family medicine clinics (FMC) (formerly known as general outpatient clinics (GOPC). (Note: GOPCs have been officially renamed to FMCs in Oct 2025, see this press release) As of 31 March 2019, it has a workforce of about 79,000 and some 28,000 beds. These facilities are organized into six hospital clusters according to their geographical locations, as shown in the table below. Each hospital cluster comprises a mix of acute and convalescent or rehabilitation hospitals to provide a full range of healthcare services.

Hospital cluster	Service area	Population of the area in mid-2012
Hong Kong Island Cluster (HKIC)	Hong Kong Island and outlying Islands (excluding Lantau Island)	1,369,500
Kowloon Central Cluster (KCC)	Mong Kok, Yau Ma Tei, Tsim Sha Tsui and Kowloon City, Wong Tai Sin districts	1,103,200
Kowloon East Cluster (KEC)	Kwun Tong, Tseung Kwan O and part of the Sai Kung districts	1,012,000
Kowloon West Cluster (KWC)	Districts of Sham Shui Po, Kwai Tsing, Tsuen Wan and North Lantau	787,600
New Territories East Cluster (NTEC)	Sha Tin, Tai Po, North and part of the Sai Kung districts	1,321,300
New Territories West Cluster (NTWC)	Tuen Mun and Yuen Long districts	1,085,300

=== Defunct clusters ===
Hospital cluster	Notes
Hong Kong East Cluster (HKEC)	Merged into Hong Kong Island Cluster (HKIC) on 1 April, 2026
Hong Kong West Cluster (HKWC)	Merged into Hong Kong Island Cluster (HKIC) on 1 April, 2026

== Corporate governance ==
=== Hospital Authority Board ===
According to the Hospital Authority Ordinance (Cap 113), the Chief Executive of Hong Kong appoints members of the Hospital Authority Board governing the authority. The present board consists of 27 members, including the chairman. Membership of the authority comprises 23 non-public officers, three public officers and the chief executive of the authority. Apart from the chief executive of the authority, other members are not remunerated in their capacity as board members.

==== Current and former chairmen ====
- Sir Sze-yuen Chung, GBM, GBE, JP (1 December 1990 – 31 March 1995)
- Peter Woo Kwong-ching, GBM, GBS, JP (1 April 1995 – 30 September 2000)
- Lo Ka-shui, GBS, JP (1 October 2000 – 30 September 2002)
- Edward Leong Che-hung, GBM, GBS, OBE, JP (1 October 2002 – 8 July 2004)
- Anthony Wu Ting-yuk, GBS, JP (7 October 2004 – 30 November 2013)
- John Leong Chi-yan, SBS, JP (1 December 2013 – 30 November 2019)
- Henry Fan Hung-ling, SBS, JP (1 December 2019 – present)

==== Current and former chief executives ====
- Yeoh Eng-kiong, OBE, JP (January 1994 – September 1999)
- William Ho Shiu-wei, JP (20 September 1999 – 19 September 2005)
- Ko Wing-man, JP (acting, 24 March 2003 – [?])
- Vivian Wong Taam Chi-woon, JP (acting, 20 September 2005 – 28 February 2006)
- Shane Solomon (1 March 2006 – 23 July 2010)
- Leung Pak-yin, JP (8 November 2010 – 31 July 2019)
- Ko Pat-sing, Tony (1 August 2019 - )

=== Board Committees ===
To perform its roles and exercise its powers, the board has established 11 functional committees:

- Audit and Risk Committee
- Emergency Executive Committee
- Executive Committee
- Finance Committee
- Human Resources Committee
- Information Technology Services Governing Committee
- Main Tender Board
- Medical Services Development Committee
- Public Complaints Committee
- Staff Appeals Committee, and
- Supporting Services Development Committee.

=== Hospital Governing Committees ===
To enhance community participation and governance of public hospitals, the authority has established 31 Hospital Governing Committees in 38 hospitals and institutions. These committees received regular management reports from the hospital chief executives, monitored operational and financial performance of the hospitals, participated in human resources and procurement functions, as well as hospital and community partnership activities.

=== Regional Advisory Committees ===
To provide the authority with advice on the healthcare needs for specific regions of Hong Kong, the authority has established three Regional Advisory Committees. Each of the committees meets four times a year.

== Funding ==
The authority is funded primarily by Hong Kong Government subvention, which amounted to HK$42.5 billion for 2012–2013, equating to over 90% of the authority's total income. Its other incomes include hospital and clinic fees and charges, donations, and investment.

The authority's total expenditure was HK$46.1 billion for 2012–2013, with 70% used to pay staff, and 14% to pay for drugs and other supplies.

== Controversies ==
=== 2003 SARS outbreak ===
In 2003, Hong Kong suffered from the outbreak of SARS and recorded considerable number of patients and casualties. The slow and delayed response of Hospital Authority was criticized. Believing that Hong Kong was safe from infectious diseases, the HA had inadequate preparation for facilities like isolated wards and single rooms that are important for the treatment of highly contagious diseases. In the early phase of the outbreak, public hospitals placed SARS patients in non-quarantined rooms that severely increased the chance of infection.

=== 2008 milk contamination ===
On the day when a Hong Kong girl was diagnosed as the territory's first victim of the 2008 Chinese milk scandal, anxious parents were frustrated to discover that doctors at the special unit set up at the Princess Margaret Hospital were taking the day off. Deputy Director of Health Gloria Tam said that it was "not something so urgent that it needs to be dealt with in 24 hours... They can go during office hours tomorrow". Medical sector legislator Leung Ka-lau said the lack of daily cover during the crisis was "insensitive". While the first victim left hospital after successful treatment one day later, two more children were admitted to hospital on 22 September; the Hospital Authority was reportedly overwhelmed when over 100 parents demanding check-ups for their children at Princess Margaret amids confusion about referrals and registration procedures, causing Secretary for Food and Health, York Chow to grovel for having underestimated the problem. Chow pledged 18 additional facilities around Hong Kong would be operational the next day.

=== Waiting times ===
Waiting time for elective treatment is quite high. The average waiting time for cataract surgery in 2014 was 22 months.

=== Chinese medicine and COVID-19 ===
In September 2022, Henry Fan Hung Ling, chairman of the Hospital Authority, lobbied for a "significant expansion" of traditional Chinese medicine used in Hong Kong's public healthcare. Days later, the Hospital Authority released information from a study it conducted, showing that traditional Chinese medicine could be used to cure long COVID. Rowena Wong Hau-wan, the Hospital Authority's chief manager (Chinese medicine), said "The research has served as evidence on treatment of Covid residual symptoms with Chinese medicine." However, Professor Bian Zhaoxian admitted that the patients could have recovered naturally rather than because of the Chinese medicine, and that the study was not conducted using a scientific randomized controlled trial.

=== COVID-19 and public hospitals ===
On 27 August 2022, Health Secretary Lo Chung-mau suggested that private hospitals were slacking and could be punished for not taking in non-COVID patients from public hospitals due to potential overcrowding at public hospitals, though Dr. Siddharth Sridhar of HKU said that the overcrowding was because elderly patients with COVID-19 were often sent to public hospitals even if the severity of their symptoms was low. Months later in November 2022, Lau Ka-hin of the Hospital Authority said that public hospitals would be allowed to have COVID-19 positive patients with low symptoms to isolate at home instead of being treated at the hospital. Lau said that 60% of accident and emergency patients were taken in solely because of their COVID-19 positive result.

== See also ==
- Health in Hong Kong
- List of hospitals in Hong Kong
- Fung Hong
- Health informatics
