= Pamela Youde =

Wife of the 26th Governor of Hong Kong

Lady Youde
- Born: December 6, 1926 (age 99); Kent, England
- Spouse: Sir Edward Youde (m. 1951–1986)

Pamela, Lady Youde, OBE^{[†]} (née Fitt; born 6 December 1926) is a native of Kent, England, and the wife of Sir Edward Youde, the 26th Governor of Hong Kong. She served as Governor's wife from 1982 to 1986 by virtue of her husband's position.

Lady Youde developed a love for Chinese culture from an early age, and before becoming the Governor's wife she had lived in China on four separate occasions for a combined total of eleven years. She first came to China in 1948 after joining the Foreign Office, serving in clerical roles in Shanghai, Nanjing, and Beijing. Following her marriage in 1951, she returned to England and became a full-time homemaker, but subsequently lived in China three more times through her diplomat husband's postings, including residing in Beijing from 1974 to 1978 as wife of the British Ambassador to China. Her many years in China, combined with studies in Chinese at the SOAS University of London, enabled Lady Youde to speak fluent Mandarin.

During her four years as the Governor's wife, Lady Youde was actively involved in charitable work, serving as President of The Community Chest Hong Kong and President of the Hong Kong Girl Guides Association, among other roles. She also participated in various social and official occasions, including the reception for Queen Elizabeth II's visit to Hong Kong in October 1986. Her husband was the only Governor of Hong Kong to die in office. In recognition of his contributions to the development of higher education in Hong Kong, the Hong Kong Government, with Lady Youde's support, established the in April 1987 to provide scholarships for Hong Kong students to pursue further studies both locally and overseas. Since the Fund's establishment, Lady Youde has continuously served as a member of its Board of Trustees and its Sir Edward Youde Memorial Fund Council.

Beyond her work with the Sir Edward Youde Memorial Fund, Lady Youde has devoted herself after her husband's death to promoting educational and academic exchange between Britain and China, including serving as Chairman of the Needham Research Institute Trust from 2002 to 2008, and as a trustee of the Great Britain–China Centre Great Britain-China Educational Trust from 2000 to 2016. Lady Youde also authored an English-language travel book about China and translated traditional Chinese stories into English. Pamela Youde Nethersole Eastern Hospital is among the places in Hong Kong named after her.

== Biography ==
=== Family background ===
Lady Youde was born Pamela Fitt (née Fitt) on 6 December 1926 in Kent, England, from the Fitt family, a modestly distinguished family in the local area of Herne Bay and Whitstable. Her father, Arthur Baden Fitt, served in the Royal Air Force during World War I. At the time of Lady Youde's birth, Arthur was working as the hotel manager at the Marine Hotel in Whitstable, which was owned by his father (Lady Youde's grandfather), George John Fitt. Arthur later operated the smaller Richmond Inn in Herne Bay, and after World War II became involved in the yacht and motor vehicle trade in Kent, particularly in recreational vehicles, with considerable success. His company, Arthur Fitt Caravans, was one of the approved dealers of the National Caravan Council.

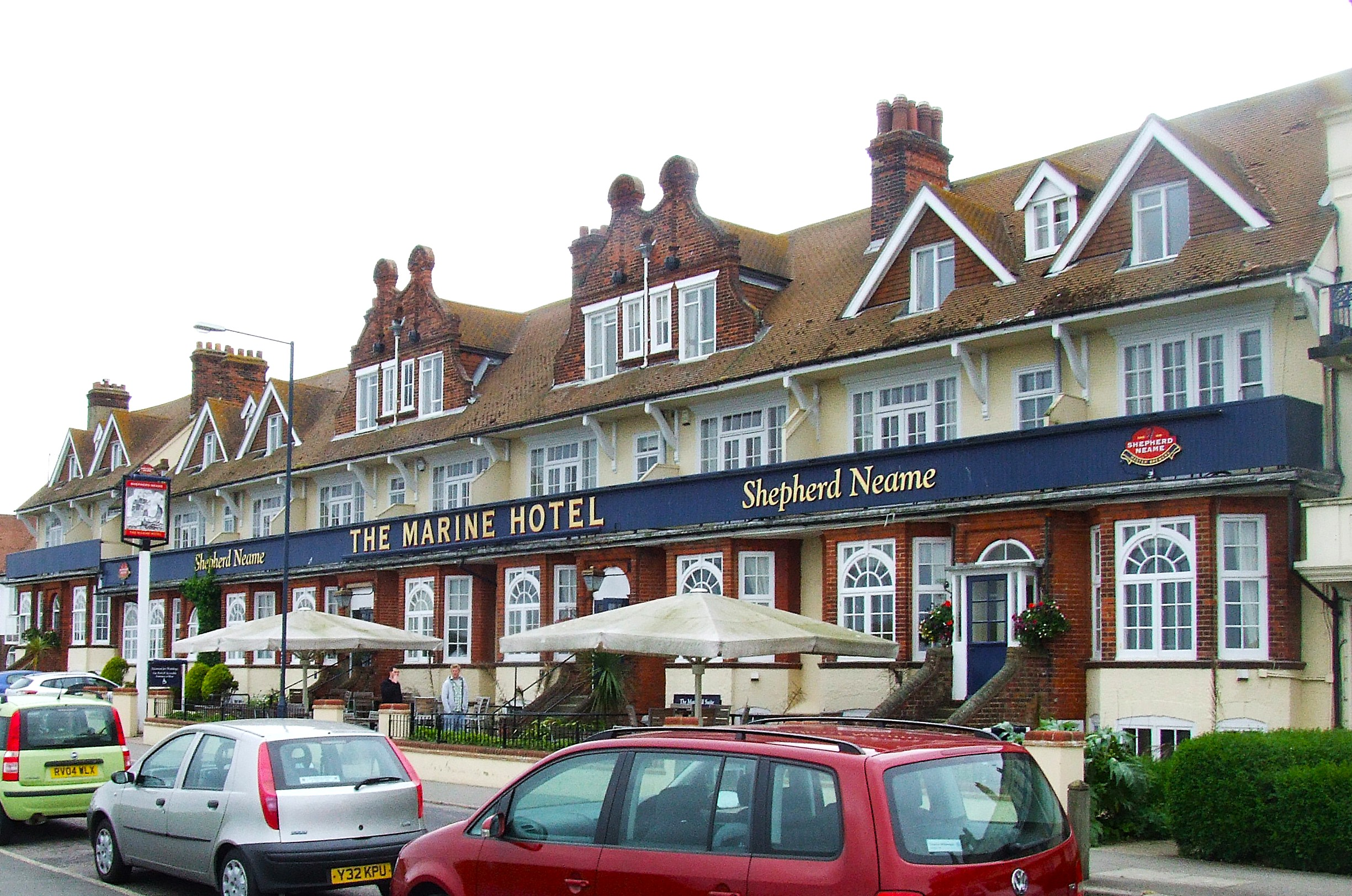
Lady Youde's family once operated the Marine Hotel in Whitstable, Kent

Lady Youde's father married Margery Wooff (1903–1979) on 6 December 1924, meaning Lady Youde was born on her parents' second wedding anniversary. Lady Youde was the eldest among her siblings; she had a brother and a sister, named Arthur John Fitt (born 1930) and Julia Margaret Fitt (born 1937), with her brother John later taking over their father's caravan business. Lady Youde and her family lived in Herne Bay; they also had a holiday house in the coastal town of Salcombe in Devon, where they would fish and go out to sea during holidays.

=== Experiences in China ===
During her school years, Lady Youde was active in music, singing, and performing in plays. She graduated from secondary school during World War II and in 1943, at only seventeen years of age, took a secretarial course. She subsequently worked at an engineering firm. However, Lady Youde did not aspire to lead the ordinary life of a typical working woman. Rather, she had been fascinated by China since learning about it in primary school at around the age of ten, and from that time had longed to experience Chinese life and culture. As a child, none of her family had any connection to China, so her knowledge came entirely from reading, and she formed early on a desire to go to China one day. To realise this ambition, she spent evenings after work learning Mandarin from a missionary who had served in China, whose accounts of life there deepened her understanding of the country.

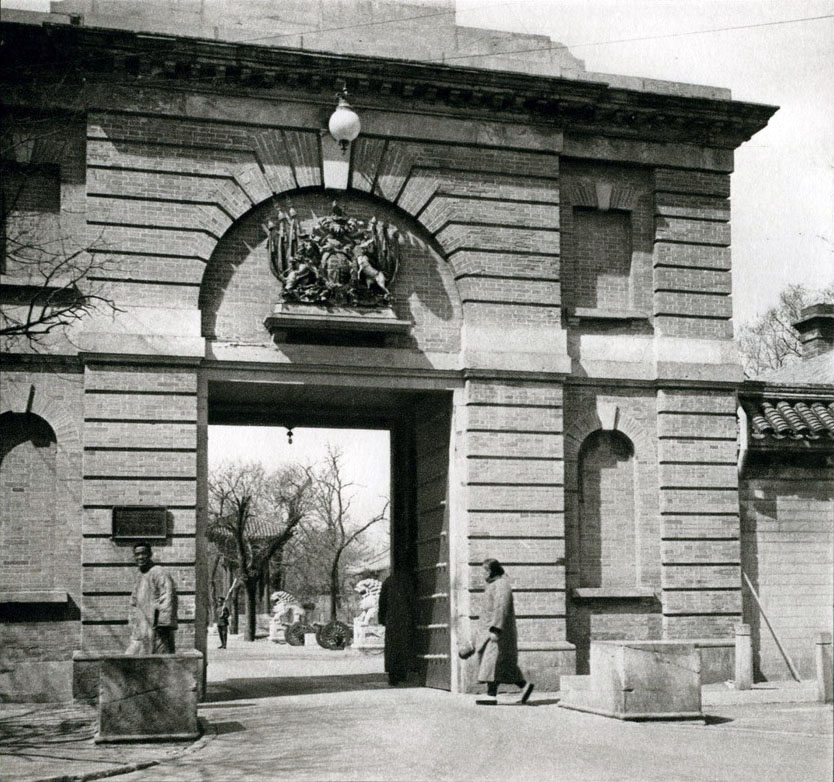
Lady Youde was transferred to Beijing in 1950 to help establish a provisional chargé d'affaires office at the former British Legation

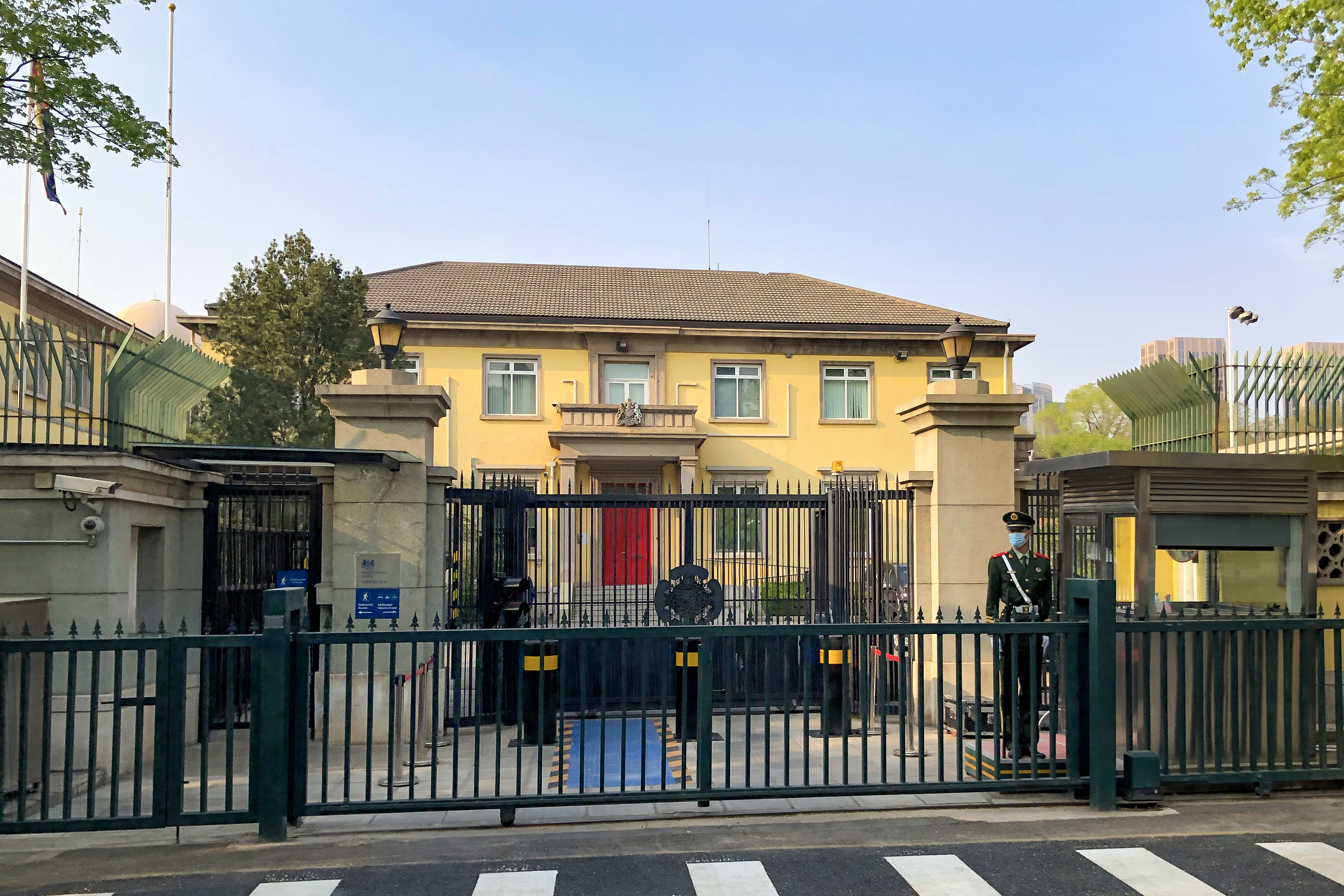
Lady Youde lived in Beijing from 1974 to 1978 as wife of the British Ambassador to China. On 2 December 1986, she accompanied her husband, by then Governor of Hong Kong, to Beijing, where they stayed at the Embassy. In the early morning of 5 December, her husband died in his sleep of a heart attack at the Embassy, while she was visiting Xi'an

Several years later, using her command of Mandarin as an advantage, Lady Youde was hired by the Foreign Office as a typist, and was subsequently posted in 1948 to Shanghai, China, where she worked in the Exhibition and Film Section of the Press Department of the British Embassy in China. Her duties included general shorthand, typing, and secretarial work, as well as participating in organising educational and medical exhibitions locally, and screening newsreels about Europe and Great Britain at universities and schools. However, Lady Youde's arrival in China coincided with the turbulent period of the Chinese Civil War. In March 1949 she was transferred to Nanjing, then the capital of the Republic of China, to work at the main British Embassy, and a month later, in April of that year, the Chinese Communist Party forces captured Nanjing. During her postings in Shanghai and Nanjing, Lady Youde took the opportunity to travel extensively, using not only her own feet but also bicycles, buses, and boats. She lived in single-staff quarters in both Shanghai and Nanjing; after moving to Nanjing, although she was temporarily unable to venture out due to the fighting between Nationalist and Communist forces and the suspension of water and electricity, she was free to move about after the Communist liberation of Nanjing.

In October 1949, the People's Republic of China was proclaimed in Beijing, and mainland China changed sovereignty as the Nationalist Party retreated to Taiwan. In January 1950, Britain recognised the People's Republic of China, and the two countries established diplomatic relations at the level of provisional chargé d'affaires, later upgraded to chargé d'affaires level in June 1954. Accordingly, Lady Youde was transferred to Beijing in 1950 to help establish the provisional chargé d'affaires office at the former British Legation. In June of that year, she passed her probationary period and was issued a Civil Service Certificate as a Grade I Executive Officer, with her substantive appointment backdated to August 1949. In Beijing, Lady Youde's freedom of movement was restricted; although she was initially permitted to travel by train to visit temples in the suburbs, these temples were subsequently ordered closed by the authorities and she was no longer able to visit them. In 1951, she married Edward Youde (later Sir Edward; 1924–1986), then a Third Secretary and Vice-Consul, in Beijing, formally becoming Lady Youde, whereupon she resigned from her post and became a full-time homemaker.

After their marriage, the Youdes returned to England, with Edward posted to the Foreign Office in London while Lady Youde enrolled at SOAS, University of London, from which she graduated with an undergraduate degree. There she met D. C. Lau and other sinologists from Hong Kong, with whom she formed lifelong friendships. As an alumna of SOAS, she was later appointed to the SOAS governing body. In 1953, Youde was posted to Beijing as Second Secretary at the British chargé d'affaires office, and Lady Youde accompanied him; their elder daughter Jennifer was born there in January 1955. In January 1956, Youde was transferred to the British Embassy in Washington, D.C., United States, and was promoted to First Secretary in January the following year; their younger daughter Deborah was subsequently born in August 1959.

From 1960 to 1962, Youde, accompanied by Lady Youde, was again posted to Beijing at the chargé d'affaires office, serving as First Secretary. Thereafter, Youde was successively posted to New York in the United States and back to London, England, in various roles, and Lady Youde spent some time without visiting China again, devoting herself to raising their two daughters. It was not until August 1974, when Youde was appointed to succeed Sir John Addis as British Ambassador to China, that Lady Youde went to live in China for the fourth time. By this period Sino-British relations had improved considerably, and the two countries had established full ambassador-level diplomatic relations in 1972. During his tenure as Ambassador, Youde was awarded the KCMG in 1977, becoming a knight, and Lady Youde accordingly became styled Lady Youde. Although her husband left his post and returned to Britain in June 1978, as China began to open up following the end of the Cultural Revolution, Lady Youde also had opportunities to visit China in a private capacity on organised tours. Her many years of experience in China prompted the London publisher Batsford Books to invite her to write the China volume for their travel book series, which also included volumes on California, Florida, India, Greek Macedonia, Malaysia and Singapore, South Africa, and West Germany. After eighteen months of writing, her work China: Through the Eyes of Pamela Youde was published in early 1982, with a Chinese-language edition subsequently published by Ming Pao Publications in 1983.

=== As Governor's wife ===
In December 1981, the British Government announced that Sir Edward Youde would succeed Sir Murray MacLehose (later Lord MacLehose) as the 26th Governor of Hong Kong, and he arrived in Hong Kong on 20 May the following year to take up his post, accompanied by Lady Youde. Before her husband assumed the governorship, Lady Youde had also visited Hong Kong on a private visit in February 1982 at the invitation of Lady MacLehose (later Lady MacLehose of Beoch), staying at Government House and calling on the Hong Kong Executive and Legislative Councils Members' Office, where she lunched with the female members of the councils. Additionally, Youde had previously used the romanisation "Yau Tak" as a transliteration of his name while in China, but changed it to "Youde" before assuming the governorship. After he assumed the governorship, the Hong Kong Government's Chinese Language Division finalised the official Chinese transliteration of Lady Youde's name as "彭雯麗" in September 1982.

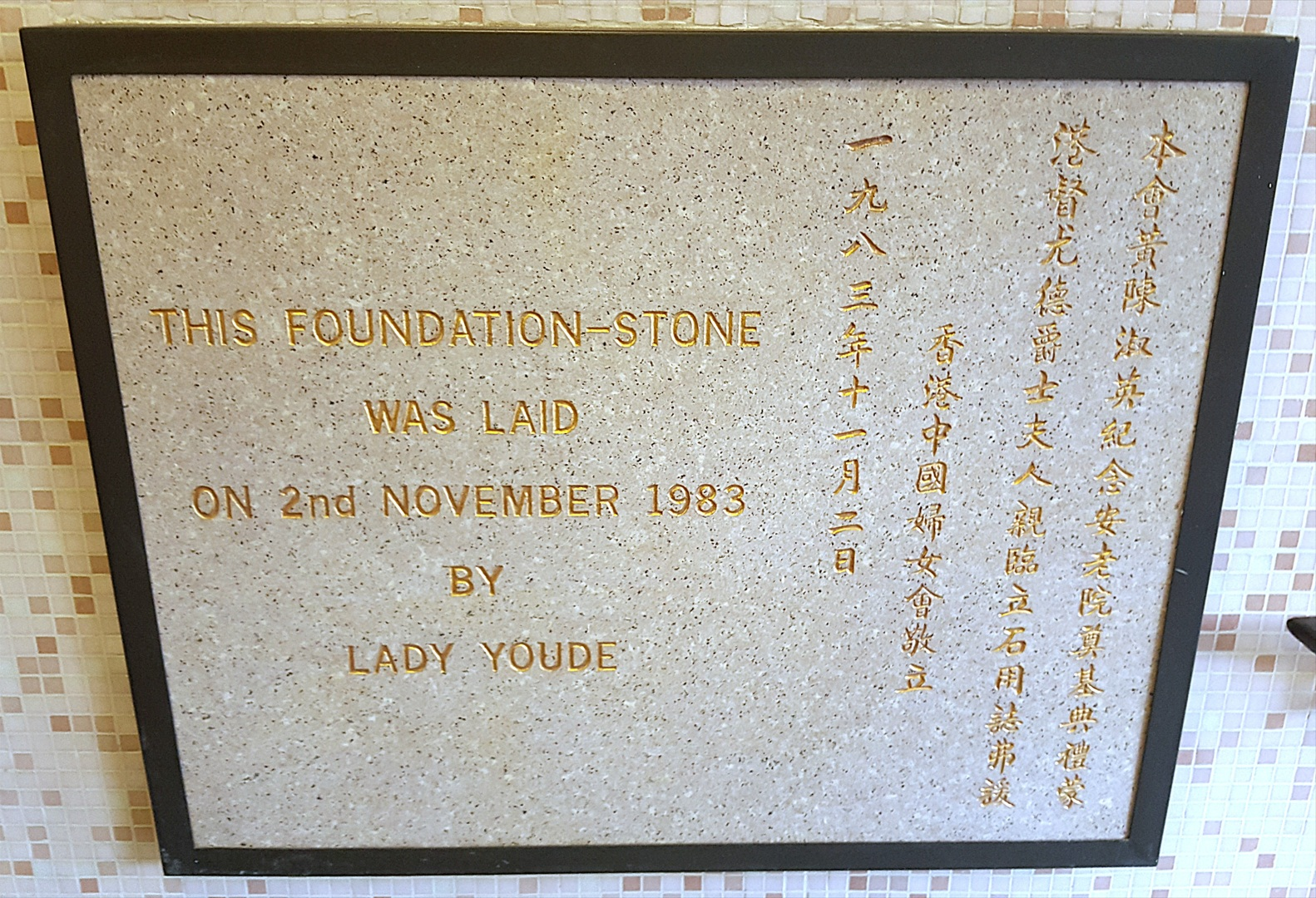
Lady Youde laying the foundation stone for the Hong Kong Chinese Women's Club Wong Chan Sook Ying Memorial Care and Attention Home on 2 November 1983

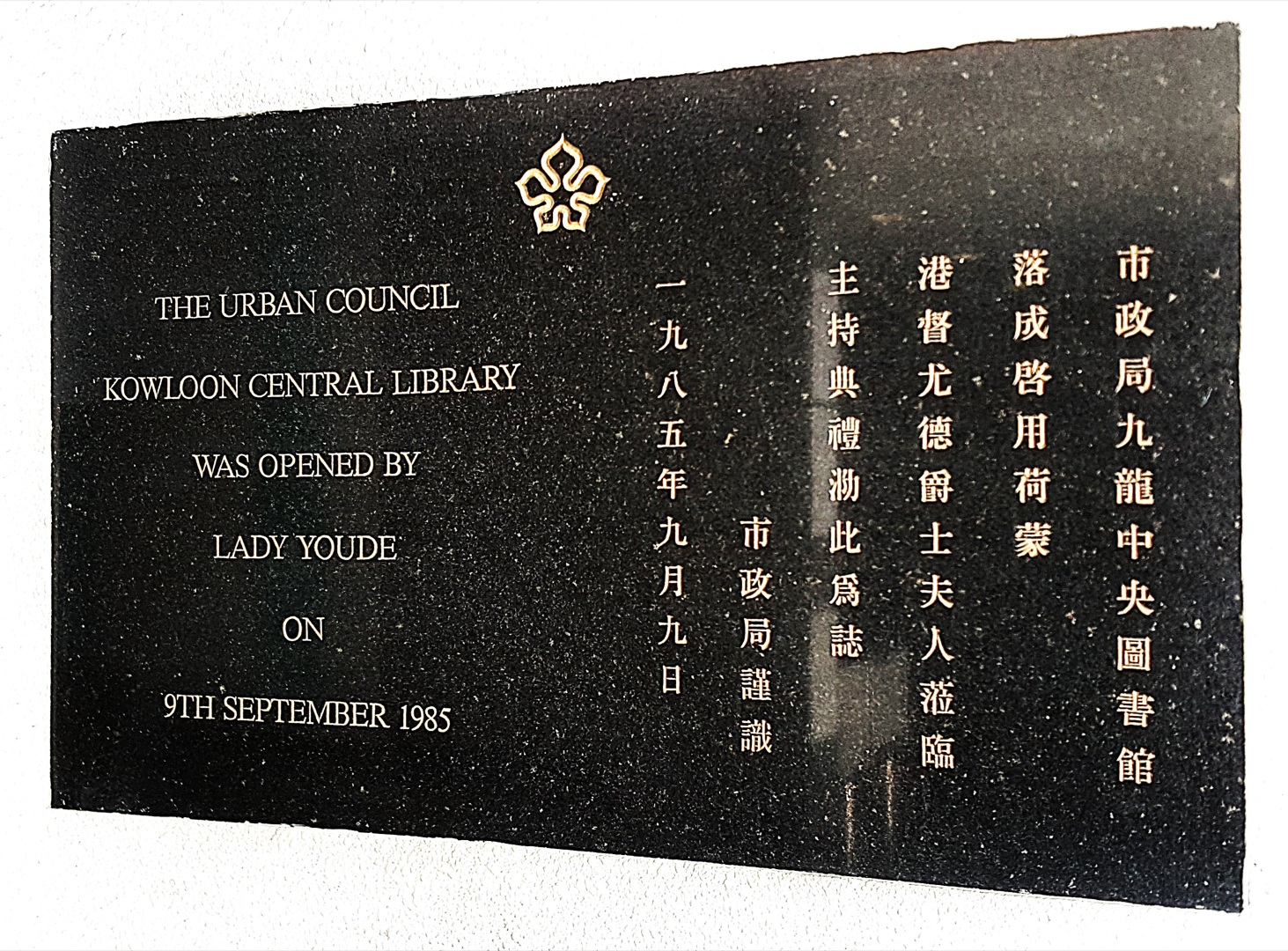
Lady Youde presiding over the opening ceremony of the Urban Council Kowloon Central Library (later renamed Kowloon Public Library) on 9 September 1985

As the Governor's wife, Lady Youde frequently represented her husband at various cultural and charitable activities, as well as social and official occasions, including welcoming Queen Elizabeth II and her husband Prince Philip, Duke of Edinburgh during their visit to Hong Kong in October 1986. Lady Youde enjoyed mingling with ordinary citizens and often went among the people to understand their circumstances. For instance, shortly after arriving in Hong Kong, the territory experienced the severe rainstorm of 29 May 1982, with Kwun Tong in Kowloon among the worst-affected areas. After the disaster, Lady Youde accompanied her husband to visit victims in the affected areas, and, being fluent in Mandarin, engaged with them in depth to offer comfort and sympathy. In 1983, Lady Youde succeeded Michael Sandberg (later Lord Sandberg), Chairman of the Hongkong and Shanghai Banking Corporation, as President of Community Chest Hong Kong. During her tenure she was particularly devoted to fundraising efforts, regularly participating with her husband in Community Chest events and never missing Board of Directors meetings. Community Chest under her leadership continued to organise various fundraising activities including the Walk for Millions, with the inaugural walk along the Island Eastern Corridor on 3 June 1984 attracting over 98,000 participants, breaking the record since the Walk for Millions first began in 1971.

Out of her love for culture and the arts and her concern for vulnerable communities, Lady Youde accepted invitations to serve in various honorary capacities during her time in Hong Kong, including as Honorary Patron of the Hong Kong Children's Choir, Honorary Patron of the Royal Academy of Dance Hong Kong Branch, Patron of the Hong Kong Academy of Ballet, Patron of the Hong Kong Archaeological Society, Honorary Patron of the Chinese Customs Promotion Association, Patron of the Hong Kong Zonta Club, Patron of the Infant Welfare Society, and Patron of the Hong Kong Association for people with intellectual disabilities (forerunner of the Hong Chi Association) and Patron of the Hong Kong Special Olympics. In keeping with custom, Lady Youde also served as President of the Hong Kong Girl Guides Association in her capacity as Governor's wife, during which the Association marked its 70th anniversary in 1986, and she officiated at the 70th anniversary celebration held at the Hong Kong Coliseum on 27 April of that year.

However, Lady Youde's husband was also the only Governor of Hong Kong in the territory's history to die in office. Youde had in fact been diagnosed with heart disease as early as 1971, and had undergone coronary artery bypass surgery in 1981 before assuming the governorship. He was also deeply involved in the Sino-British negotiations on Hong Kong's future, carrying an extremely heavy workload. Sir Sze-yuen Chung, who served as Senior Unofficial Member of the Executive Council during Youde's tenure as Governor, later noted in his memoirs that signs of Youde's impending death had appeared as early as the summer of 1986. Although his health had been a subject of public concern before he assumed the governorship, the general public had little knowledge of his health condition after he took office. On 2 December 1986, Youde, as a guest, accompanied a high-level economic and trade delegation led by Lydia Dunn (later Baroness Dunn), Chairman of the Hong Kong Trade Development Council, to Beijing to visit a Hong Kong products exhibition held there, with Lady Youde also in attendance. During the Beijing visit, the Youdes stayed at the British Embassy at 11 Guanghua Road, Jianguomen, and were due to return to Hong Kong on 5 December. However, in the early hours of that morning, Youde was found collapsed in his room at the Embassy with no signs of life; he was estimated to have died in his sleep from a heart attack at around midnight, aged 62.

The day Youde died, 5 December 1986, was the day before Lady Youde's 60th birthday. At the time of the incident, Lady Youde had been visiting Xi'an accompanied by Lydia Dunn and was therefore not at her husband's side. Upon learning of the news, she flew back to Beijing on 5 December, and it was only after her arrival at the British Embassy that afternoon that the hearse carrying Youde's remains set out for Peking Union Medical College Hospital. Meanwhile, the Youdes' two daughters Jennifer and Deborah, who were in England, flew immediately from London to Hong Kong upon learning the news, and then took a Royal Air Force aircraft to reach Beijing on the afternoon of 6 December to be reunited with Lady Youde. That same afternoon, Youde's remains were flown back to Hong Kong by Royal Air Force aircraft, escorted by Lady Youde, his two daughters, and senior Hong Kong Government officials. Before leaving Beijing, Lady Youde spoke to reporters, saying: "My husband and I spent many happy moments in China; he had a special affection for China."

The news of Youde's death in office caused considerable shock in Hong Kong. On 5 December, the Government opened Government House for public condolences, and large numbers of citizens came over the following days. On the morning of 9 December, Youde's funeral was held at Government House with full military honours, after which the coffin was moved to St John's Cathedral for a memorial service. In accordance with Lady Youde's wishes, after the service Youde's body was taken to Cape Collinson Crematorium for cremation, and his ashes were brought back to England to be interred in the cemetery of Canterbury Cathedral. On 19 December, Lady Youde departed Hong Kong for England, accompanied by her elder daughter Jennifer. Among those seeing them off at Kai Tak Airport were Acting Governor Sir David Akers-Jones, all members of the Executive Council, and some Government House staff. Before leaving, Lady Youde again expressed her gratitude to the people of Hong Kong:

I would like to thank you for the concern shown to me and my family. I should take the opportunity to thank every person in Hong Kong for their messages of sympathy. My daughters and I have had a very happy time in Hong Kong and it is sad to be leaving, but I will continue to take an interest in Hong Kong and hope that it will be very successful.

=== Educational and cultural work ===
In memory of Sir Edward Youde, the Sir Edward Youde Memorial Pavilion was constructed in the New Territories at Luk Keng, North District, funded by the North District Council and local residents. Lady Youde presided over the groundbreaking ceremony in May 1987 and the inauguration ceremony on 26 February 1988. The pavilion was modelled on the "twin pavilion" design found in Beijing and was the first structure of this style built in Hong Kong. The North District location was chosen in part because Youde had during his lifetime often gone hiking with Lady Youde in the nearby Plover Cove area at weekends. After her husband's death, Lady Youde would make a point of visiting the pavilion to pay her respects each time she returned to Hong Kong, until she was no longer able to do so due to her advanced age in later years. Additionally, the Edward Youde Aviary in Hong Kong Park was constructed in memory of Youde, who was an enthusiastic birdwatcher in his lifetime. Built under the auspices of the Urban Council, the Aviary opened to the public in September 1992, initially housing approximately 500 birds of around 85 species, mainly from the tropical rainforests of the Malay Archipelago, encompassing the Philippines, Papua New Guinea, Malaysia, and Indonesia. Lady Youde was closely involved in the planning of the Aviary from the outset, and was invited by the Urban Council to come to Hong Kong to preside over the inauguration ceremony on 4 November 1992.

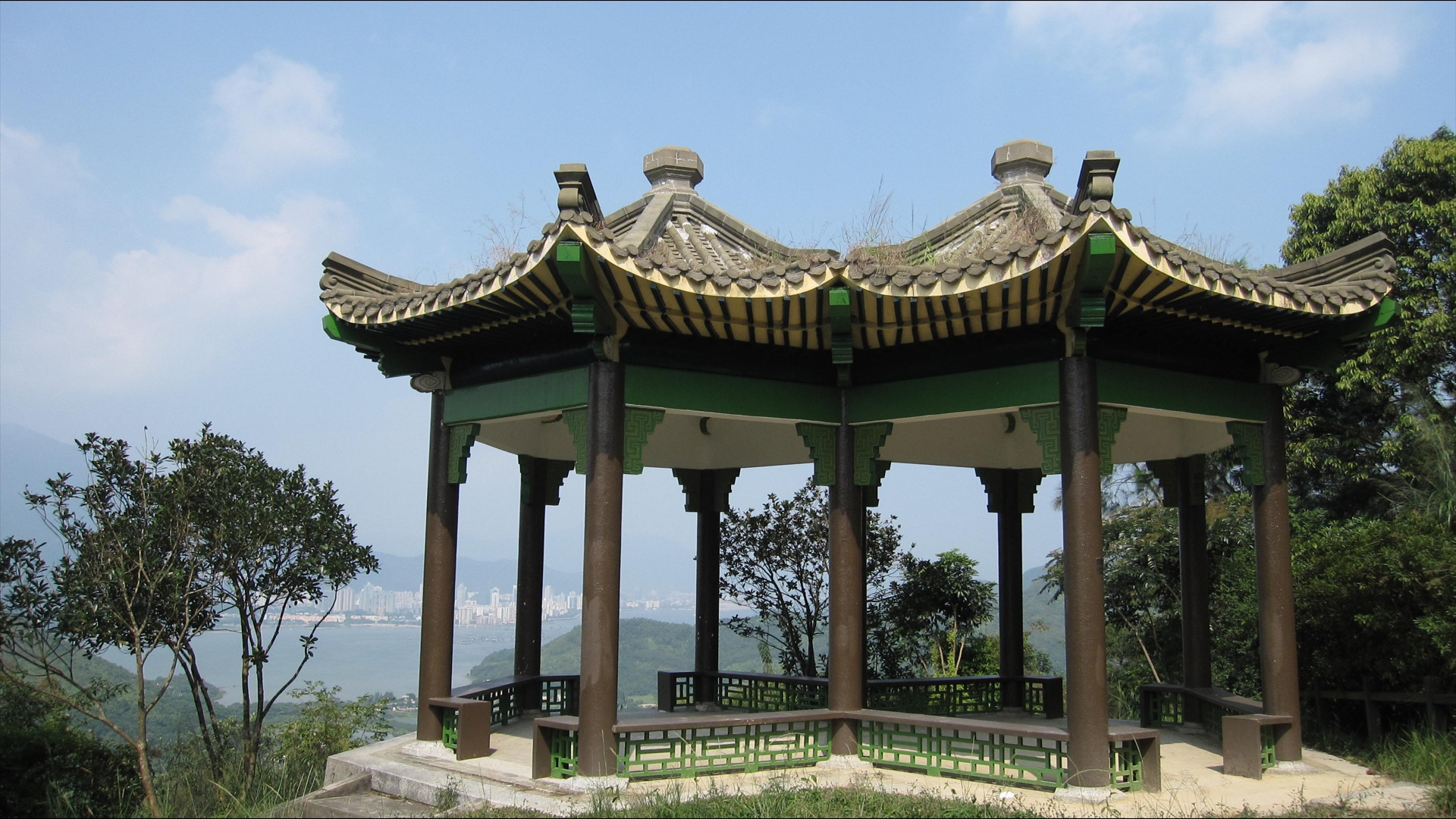
The Sir Edward Youde Memorial Pavilion, where Lady Youde presided over the groundbreaking ceremony in May 1987 and the inauguration on 26 February 1988

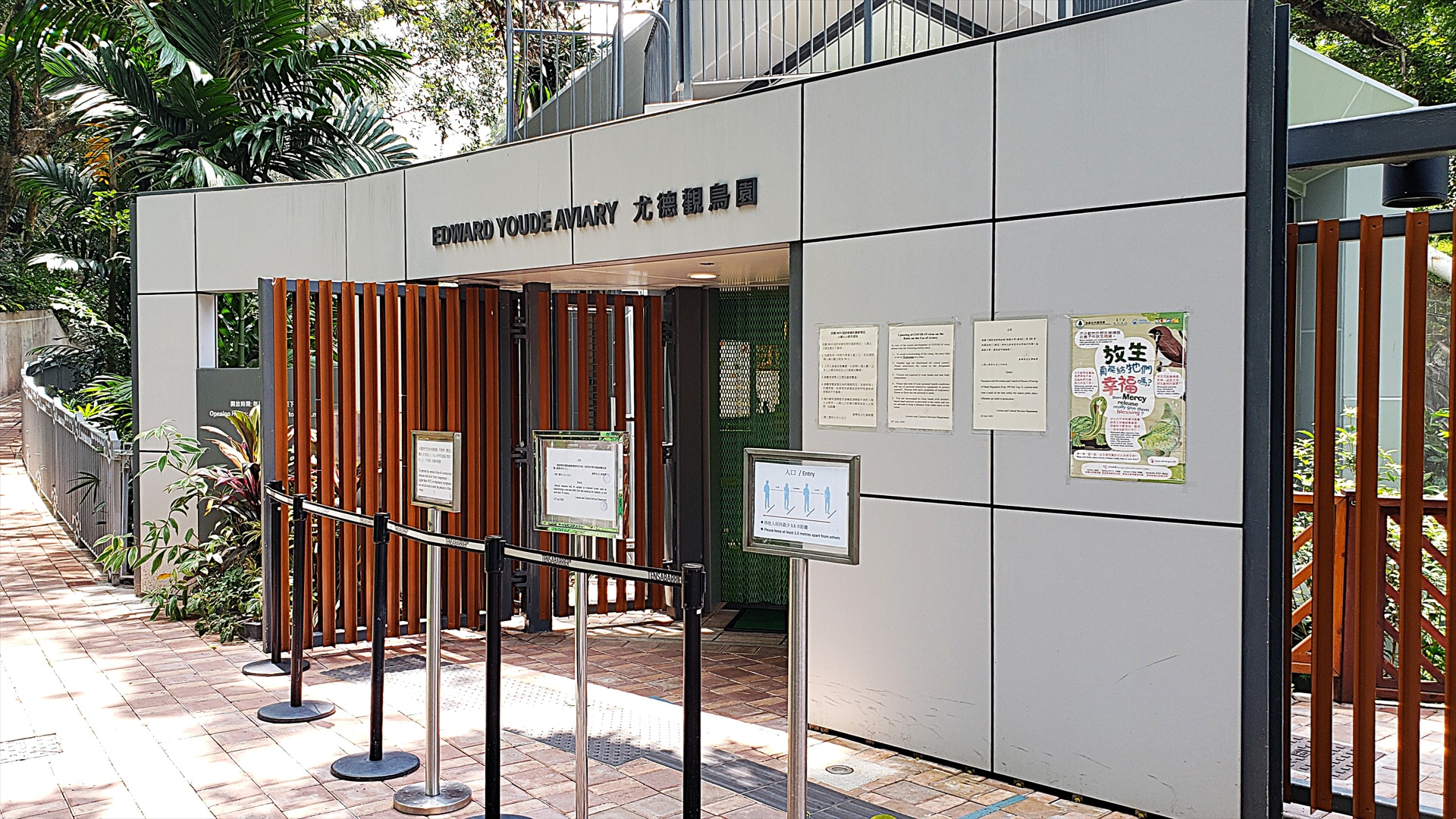
The Edward Youde Aviary in Hong Kong Park, inaugurated by Lady Youde on 4 November 1992

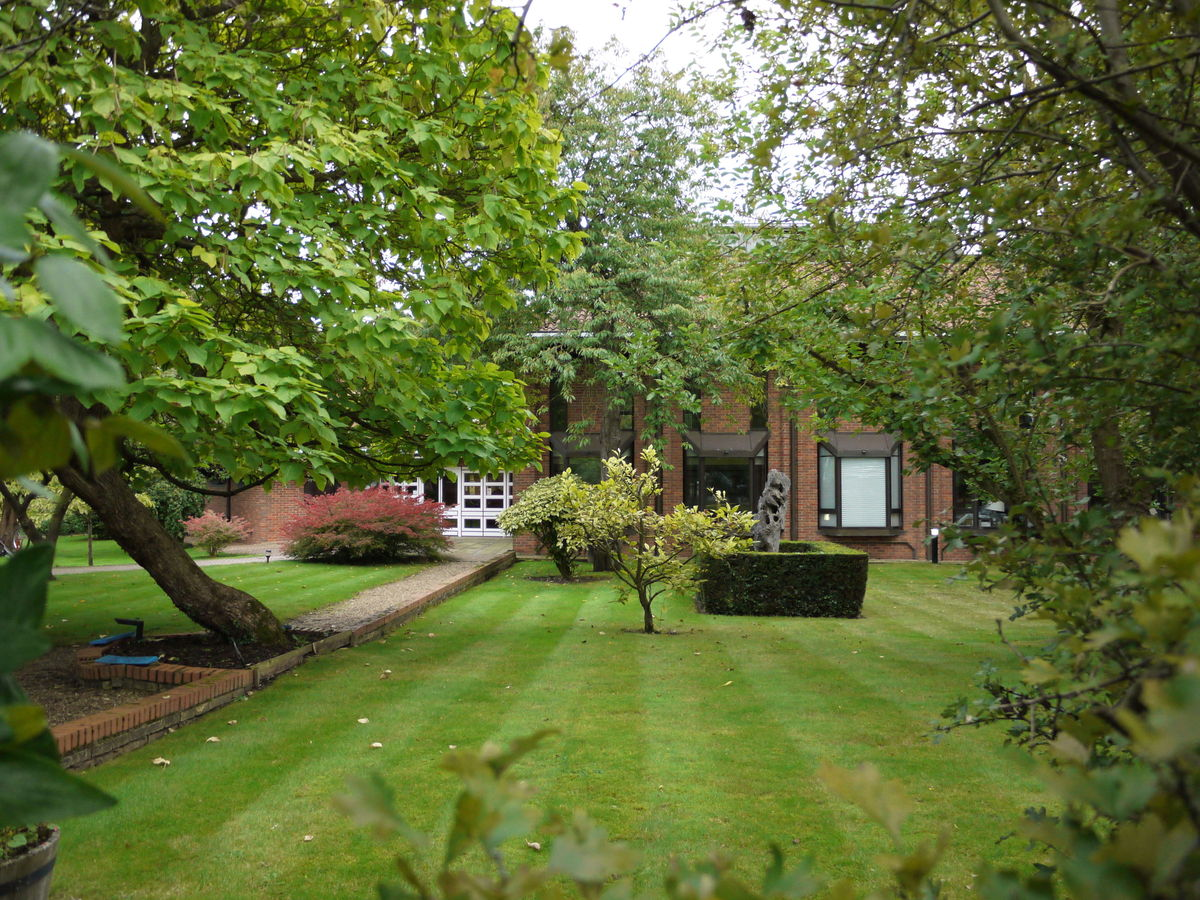
Lady Youde served as Chairman of the Needham Research Institute Trust from 2002 to 2008

However, for Lady Youde, the most meaningful memorial to her husband was the establishment of the Sir Edward Youde Memorial Fund. Shortly after Youde's death, the Hong Kong Government planned to establish a fund as a memorial to Youde, and consulted Lady Youde on the matter. Bearing in mind Youde's active promotion of the development of higher education in Hong Kong during his governorship—such as facilitating the establishment of the City Polytechnic of Hong Kong (predecessor of City University of Hong Kong) in 1984, and working towards the founding of the Hong Kong University of Science and Technology, which eventually opened in 1991—Lady Youde agreed that the fund should be devoted to educational purposes, particularly sponsoring Hong Kong students to study and conduct research overseas. Accordingly, the Executive Council resolved at its meeting on 16 December 1986 to establish the memorial fund, and at that meeting Acting Governor Sir David Akers-Jones, in his capacity as Chief Secretary, set up a preparatory committee. The committee was chaired by Sir Sze-yuen Chung, then Senior Unofficial Member of the Executive Council, with members including Lydia Dunn, Unofficial Member of both the Executive and Legislative Councils and Senior Unofficial Member of the Legislative Council; Donald Liao, Secretary for Home Affairs; Guy Watkins, Chief Executive of the Royal Hong Kong Jockey Club; and the Director of Civil Prosecutions, J.F. Mathews.

The plan to establish the memorial fund received an enthusiastic response from all sectors of Hong Kong society. Within just a few months, donations to the fund had accumulated to HK$76 million by March 1987. By comparison, the MacLehose Trust Fund, established in 1982 to commemorate the departure of former Governor Sir Murray MacLehose, had raised only HK$23 million—more than three times less. At the same time, the Government swiftly drafted legislation, and the Sir Edward Youde Memorial Fund Ordinance (Chapter 1140 of the Laws of Hong Kong) was passed on three readings by the Legislative Council and came into effect in April 1987, marking the formal establishment of the Sir Edward Youde Memorial Fund. At the invitation of the Government, Lady Youde has served continuously since the Fund's establishment in April 1987 as a member of its Board of Trustees and its Council, participating respectively in decisions on the Fund's investment arrangements and its use.

Over the years, Lady Youde has taken a keen interest in the work of the Fund, regularly returning to Hong Kong to attend its meetings, scholarship selection processes, and the annual scholarship presentation ceremonies, at which she delivers a speech. In 1992, some recipients of the Fund's scholarships founded the Sir Edward Youde Memorial Fund Scholars' Association, and Lady Youde accepted an invitation to become Honorary Patron of the Association. Furthermore, with 1997 approaching, Lady Youde engaged in lobbying efforts to ensure that the Fund would continue after the handover of Hong Kong. On 30 June 1997, she came to Hong Kong in person to attend the Hong Kong handover ceremony, witnessing the handover of Hong Kong at the Hong Kong Convention and Exhibition Centre from the British side's guest platform alongside former Governors Lord MacLehose and Lord Wilson and their respective spouses. As Lady Youde grew older she gradually stepped back from the Fund's work, but continued to insist on coming to Hong Kong in person each year to attend the scholarship presentation ceremony. Over nearly forty years, the Sir Edward Youde Memorial Fund had by 2026 disbursed a cumulative total of over HK$272 million, providing scholarships for over 890,000 students to pursue studies locally or overseas and to participate in various activities, including approximately 32,450 students who received awards under various incentive schemes. Among scholarship and postgraduate scholarship recipients, over 2,920 had completed their respective programmes.

On another front, Lady Youde also promoted engagement with China in Britain itself, including serving as Chairman of the Society for Anglo-Chinese Understanding, serving as a patron of the International Dunhuang Programme from 1994, and serving as Honorary Adviser to the Society for Anglo-Chinese Understanding and Patron of the London Chinese Community Centre; the 48 Group Club, a business-led organisation founded to promote Sino-British relations, also invited Lady Youde to serve as an Honorary Fellow. In 1998, Lady Youde was invited to become one of the trustees of the East Asian History of Science Trust, which oversees the independently operated Needham Research Institute at Robinson College, Cambridge, supporting visiting scholars in researching the history of science and technology in relation to China, Japan, and Korea. The Trust was subsequently renamed the Needham Research Institute Trust in 2002. During her time as a trustee, the Lee Quo-wei Foundation (founded and chaired by Sir Lee Quo-wei, former Chairman of Hang Seng Bank) funded the production between 1998 and 2002 of an English-language documentary series entitled Dragon's Ascent, which provided an in-depth survey of Joseph Needham's lifelong research into the history of Chinese science and technology. The documentary comprised eight episodes, produced with the assistance of the Needham Research Institute, in which Lady Youde also participated; the proceeds were subsequently shared equally between the Needham Research Institute and the Institute for the History of Natural Sciences, Chinese Academy of Sciences. In 2002, Lady Youde further succeeded the historian Sir Geoffrey Lloyd as Chairman of the Trust, serving for six years before being succeeded in 2008 by Sir John Boyd, a former British Ambassador to Japan who had served as Political Adviser to the Hong Kong Government during Youde's governorship. Lady Youde remained as a trustee until 2016, upon her retirement being elected Honorary Fellow of the Institute in recognition of her many years of service.

In addition to the above work, Lady Youde maintained a long association with the Great Britain–China Centre, established by the British Government. Just over a year after leaving her role as the Governor's wife and returning to settle in England, she joined the Great Britain–China Centre in 1988 as its Vice-Chairman. The following year, on 4 June 1989, the Tiananmen Square massacre occurred in China. Lord Jenkins of Hillhead, then Chancellor of the University of Oxford and Leader of the Liberal Democrats in the House of Lords, and others proposed the establishment of an emergency fund to assist Chinese students in Britain who were unable to return to China as planned in the aftermath of the incident, enabling them to complete their studies, research, and other activities in Britain. At that time it was estimated that there were approximately 2,000 students from China studying in Britain. In response to the call by Lord Jenkins and others, the Great Britain–China Centre, under Lady Youde's leadership, promptly established the Great Britain-China Scholars Emergency Fund in the same month, with her serving concurrently as its Chairman, working with universities and colleges throughout Britain to coordinate the assessment of all emergency applications and the disbursement of funds. In July 1989, the Emergency Fund was successfully registered as an independent charitable trust with the relevant British authorities, enabling the Fund's work to proceed as planned. Within its first year of operation, the Emergency Fund raised over £150,000, which was used to assist more than 140 Chinese students in need. Since the Great Britain–China Centre assumed all administrative expenses of the Emergency Fund, all moneys raised went entirely to those assisted. Lady Youde served as Chairman of the Emergency Fund until 1994, and the Fund ceased operations in 1996. In 2000, Lady Youde stepped down as Vice-Chairman of the Great Britain–China Centre, taking on the honorary role of Vice-President, which she continues to hold. During this period, she served from 2000 to 2016 as a trustee of the Centre's Great Britain-China Educational Trust, helping to administer the Trust's scholarships (such as the China Student Award) and other scholarships funded by organisations including the Sino-British Fellowship Trust, the Universities' China Committee in London, and the Han Suyin Foundation.

Lady Youde also translated traditional Chinese stories into English during the 1990s. The idea was originally proposed by Louis Gendron, then Director of The Chinese University Press, with the primary readership being Hong Kong children aged twelve and above who had grown up overseas and whose mother tongue was English, with the aim of promoting Chinese culture to them. Having accepted the invitation, Lady Youde spent two years on research and writing, aiming to remain faithful to the original texts while making them accessible and easy to understand, and the book was published in 1995 under the title My Favourite Chinese Stories. The book contains three traditional Chinese stories: "Hou Yi and Chang'e", "Sun Wukong Borrows the Banana Fan", and "The Beheading of the Dragon King of the Jing River". The illustrations for the book were drawn by Lo King-man, then Principal of the Hong Kong Academy for Performing Arts, and Lady Youde personally recorded an audio version of the stories, which was released as a CD accompanying the book. Lady Youde had originally planned to write a second volume containing the stories of "The White Snake", "Nezha", and "The Cowherd and the Weaver Girl", but this was ultimately not realised.

In recognition of Lady Youde's work in promoting the development of education and culture in Hong Kong and mainland China, she was appointed OBE in the Queen's Birthday Honours in 1994. The City Polytechnic of Hong Kong, whose establishment Youde had promoted during his lifetime, was upgraded to City University of Hong Kong in 1994, and the following year conferred an honorary Doctor of Social Science degree on Lady Youde.

=== After turning 90 ===
Lady Youde's last visit to Hong Kong to attend the Sir Edward Youde Memorial Fund scholarship presentation ceremony in person was in 2019, when she was nearly 93 years of age. Thereafter, due to the outbreak of the COVID-19 pandemic and her advanced age and limited mobility, she was unable to come to Hong Kong in person and instead participated in the ceremony each year via online means. In early 2025, Lady Youde, then aged 98, was admitted to Tonbridge Cottage Hospital, a NHS facility in Kent, following a fall, to receive rehabilitative treatment. Although Lady Youde was unable due to her injury to participate via video in the Sir Edward Youde Memorial Fund 38th Scholarship Presentation Ceremony held in March of that year, she nevertheless wrote a dedication for the ceremony to express her support for the Fund.

== Personal life ==
Appendix: Major roles
- Grade I Executive Officer, Foreign Office, posted to China (1948–1951); Wife of the British Ambassador to China (1974–1978); Wife of the Governor of Hong Kong (1982–1986); President, Hong Kong Girl Guides Association (1982–1986); President, Community Chest Hong Kong (1983–1986); Member, Sir Edward Youde Memorial Fund Board of Trustees (1987–present); Member, Sir Edward Youde Memorial Fund Council (1987–present); Vice-Chairman, Great Britain–China Centre (1988–2000); Chairman, Great Britain-China Scholars Emergency Fund (1989–1994); Trustee, East Asian History of Science Trust (1998–2002); Vice-President, Great Britain–China Centre (2000–present); Trustee, Great Britain-China Educational Trust (2000–2016); Chairman, Needham Research Institute Trust (2002–2008); Trustee, Needham Research Institute Trust (2008–2016)

Pamela met her future husband Edward Youde (1924–1986) while working in Nanjing, China, in 1949. After a courtship of two years, the couple married in Beijing in 1951. Youde came from an ordinary family in Wales, where his father worked as a company secretary at a small timber company. Like his wife, Youde had loved China from an early age, and in 1942 enrolled at SOAS, University of London to study Chinese, though he joined the Royal Naval Volunteer Reserve the following year owing to World War II. After the war, Youde joined the Foreign Office in 1947 and was posted to Nanjing the following year. During the Chinese Civil War in 1949, he represented the British side in mediation with the People's Liberation Army during the HMS Amethyst incident of April to July of that year, successfully gaining time for the besieged British warship HMS Amethyst to escape from the Yangtze River, for which he was subsequently awarded the MBE. In 1985, Youde, by then Governor of Hong Kong, took six days' leave to travel through Jiangsu with Lady Youde on a "second honeymoon", revisiting places where he had once worked, including Nanjing.

Lady Youde and her husband had two daughters:

- Elder daughter Jennifer Olwen Youde, born January 1955, graduated from the University of Oxford with a degree in mining engineering. She worked successively for the British Government's National Coal Board and the Cabinet Office between 1977 and 1983, and later entered private practice in asset management. She married David J. Bernard in 1987.
- Younger daughter Deborah Bronwen Youde, born August 1959, graduated in law from the University of Kent, and worked as a solicitor in the British Government. She married Mark A. Haine in 1984, and later became a full-time homemaker.

Lady Youde resided mainly at a rural property in Kent, but also maintained a flat in Wimbledon, London, for convenience when conducting business in London; the flat housed a private library dedicated to books on China. In her leisure time, she also visited her younger sister's farm in the countryside, helping to tend the pedigree sheep and other livestock raised there. Lady Youde had a love of arts and culture and enjoyed painting and music. She had a particular passion for Chinese arts and culture: in addition to being fluent in Mandarin, she was accomplished at cooking Chinese cuisine, and was deeply interested in drama, music, and historical sites and customs across China. Her years living in Beijing made her an enthusiast of Peking opera, and whenever she had the opportunity to visit mainland China, she would seek out performances to attend. During her time as the Governor's wife, she also developed an interest in Cantonese opera and acquired a considerable knowledge of it. In 1982 she accepted an invitation to become an honorary member of the Royal Asiatic Society Hong Kong Branch.

Lady Youde was also known for her frugality and courtesy. Ming Pao Weekly reported that when Lady Youde travelled by air during her time as the Governor's wife, she would without exception fly economy class. On one occasion, when she was recognised by airline staff and upgraded to business class, she accepted graciously but afterwards voluntarily paid the airline the difference in fare. Furthermore, after Youde's death in December 1986, staff at Government House and Fanling Lodge spoke warmly of the Youdes when interviewed by the media. One driver who had worked in government service for nearly thirty years and served many Governors said that although he had retired in March 1986, he was unexpectedly invited back to Government House by the Youdes for a private reunion afterwards, and felt that they were entirely without airs and were grateful and loyal to those who had served them. Others who had served Lady Youde also said she was very friendly and often chatted with them.

== Works ==
- China: Through the Eyes of Pamela Youde. London: Batsford, 1982. ISBN 978-0-71343-795-9
  - (Chinese-language edition translated by Mak Chung-shing: 《尤德夫人眼中的中國》. Hong Kong: Ming Pao Publications, 1983.)
- My Favourite Chinese Stories. Hong Kong: The Chinese University Press, 1995. ISBN 978-9-62201-603-3
  - Literal translation: 《我最喜爱的中国故事》. Hong Kong: The Chinese University of Hong Kong Press, 1995.

== Honours ==
=== Awards ===
- The following lists honours in full with abbreviations:
  - Officer of the Order of the British Empire (OBE) (1994 Queen's Birthday Honours)

=== Honorary degrees ===
- Doctor of Social Science
  - City University of Hong Kong (1995)

=== Things named after her ===
Three medical facilities in Hong Kong are named after Lady Youde: the Pamela Youde Nethersole Eastern Hospital in Chai Wan, the Pamela Youde Polyclinic in Kwun Tong, and the Pamela Youde Child Assessment Centre and School Dental Clinic in Sha Tin.

The Eastern District Board resolved in February 1987 to name the then-under-construction "Eastern Hospital" as "Lady Youde Hospital". After Lady Youde's consent was obtained, the Executive Council approved this in August of the same year. In the early 1990s, the Hospital Authority planned to relocate the Alice Ho Miu Ling Nethersole Hospital (the former Nethersole Hospital) on Bonham Road, Mid-Levels, Hong Kong Island, to a new site in Tai Po. As there would be several years between the closure of the Bonham Road premises in 1993 and the opening of the new Tai Po premises in 1997, the Hospital Authority intended to second the former hospital's staff to "Lady Youde Hospital" in the interim as support. Regarding this arrangement, the then-Chairman of the Nethersole Hospital governing committee, the Reverend Canon James Li Fook-hing, hoped that "Lady Youde Hospital" would modify its name to reflect the Nethersole Hospital's participation. The Hospital Authority and the Nethersole Hospital governing committee were at an impasse for some time over the hospital's naming until, after Lady Youde's consent was again obtained, the parties reached a consensus to incorporate the "Nethersole" name, giving rise to "Pamela Youde Nethersole Eastern Hospital", commonly abbreviated as "Eastern Hospital". Eastern Hospital subsequently opened on 15 October 1993, and its formal opening ceremony was presided over by the then Governor of Hong Kong Chris Patten on 23 June 1994, witnessed by Lady Youde.

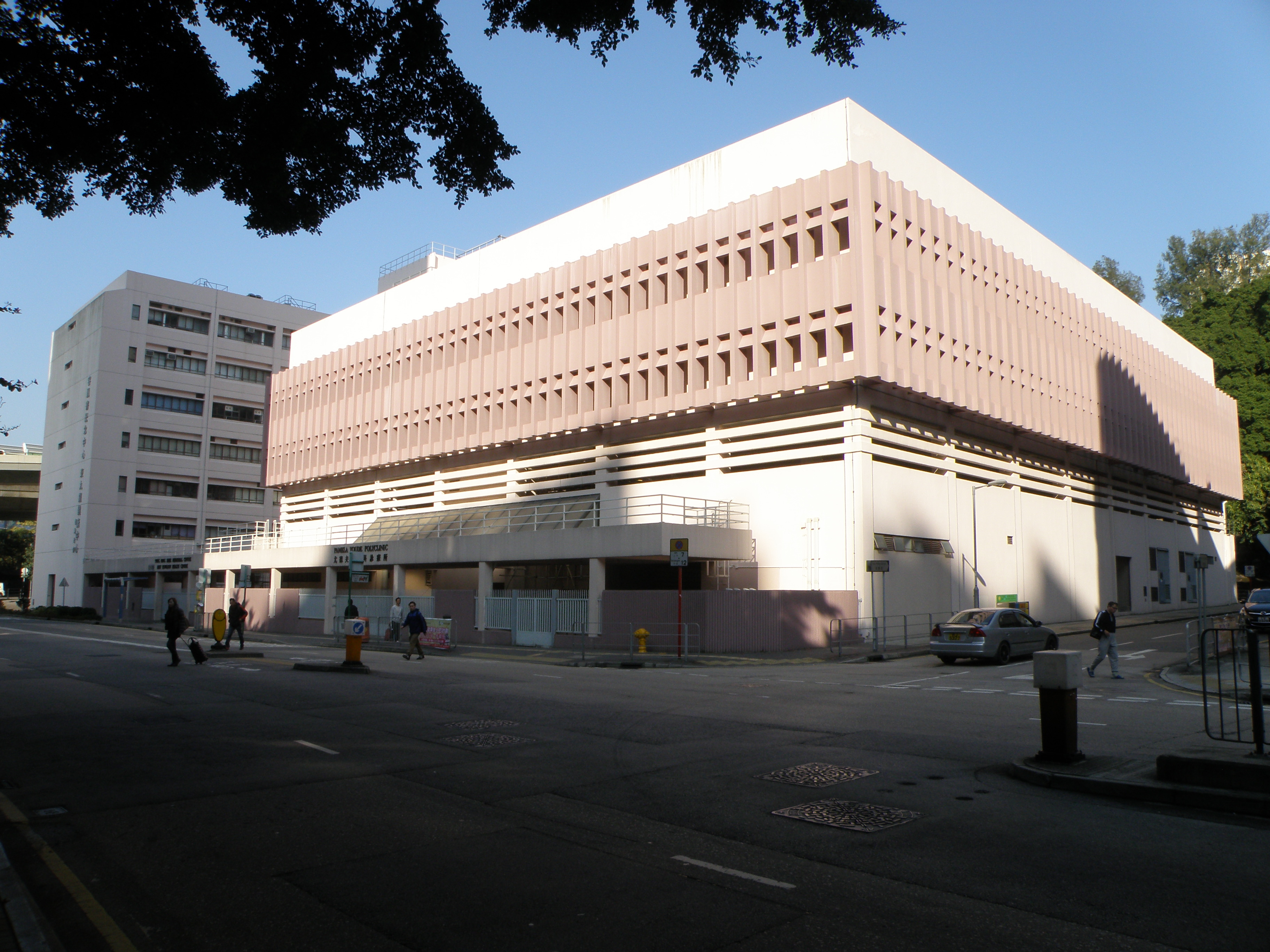
Pamela Youde Polyclinic

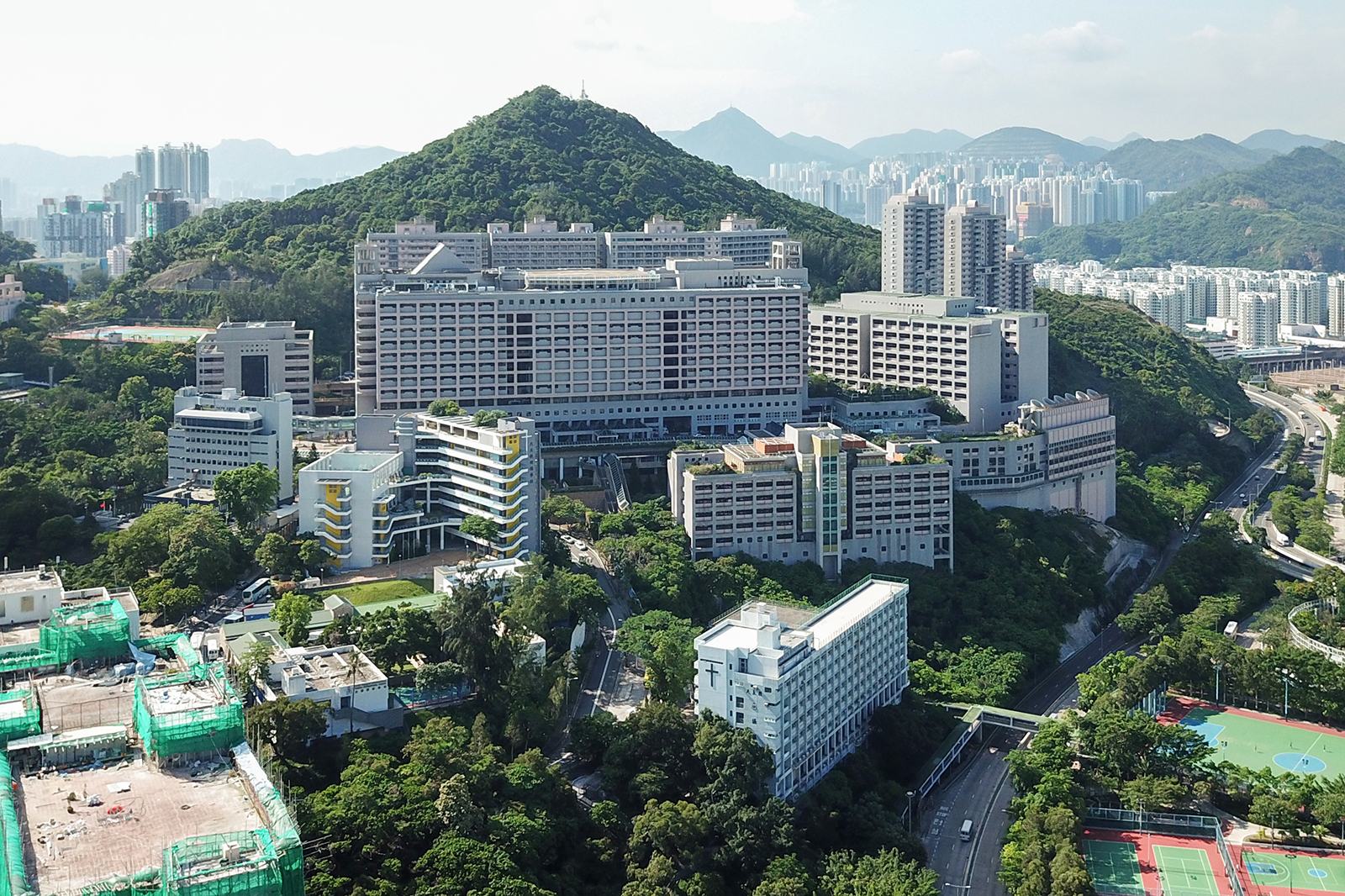
Pamela Youde Nethersole Eastern Hospital

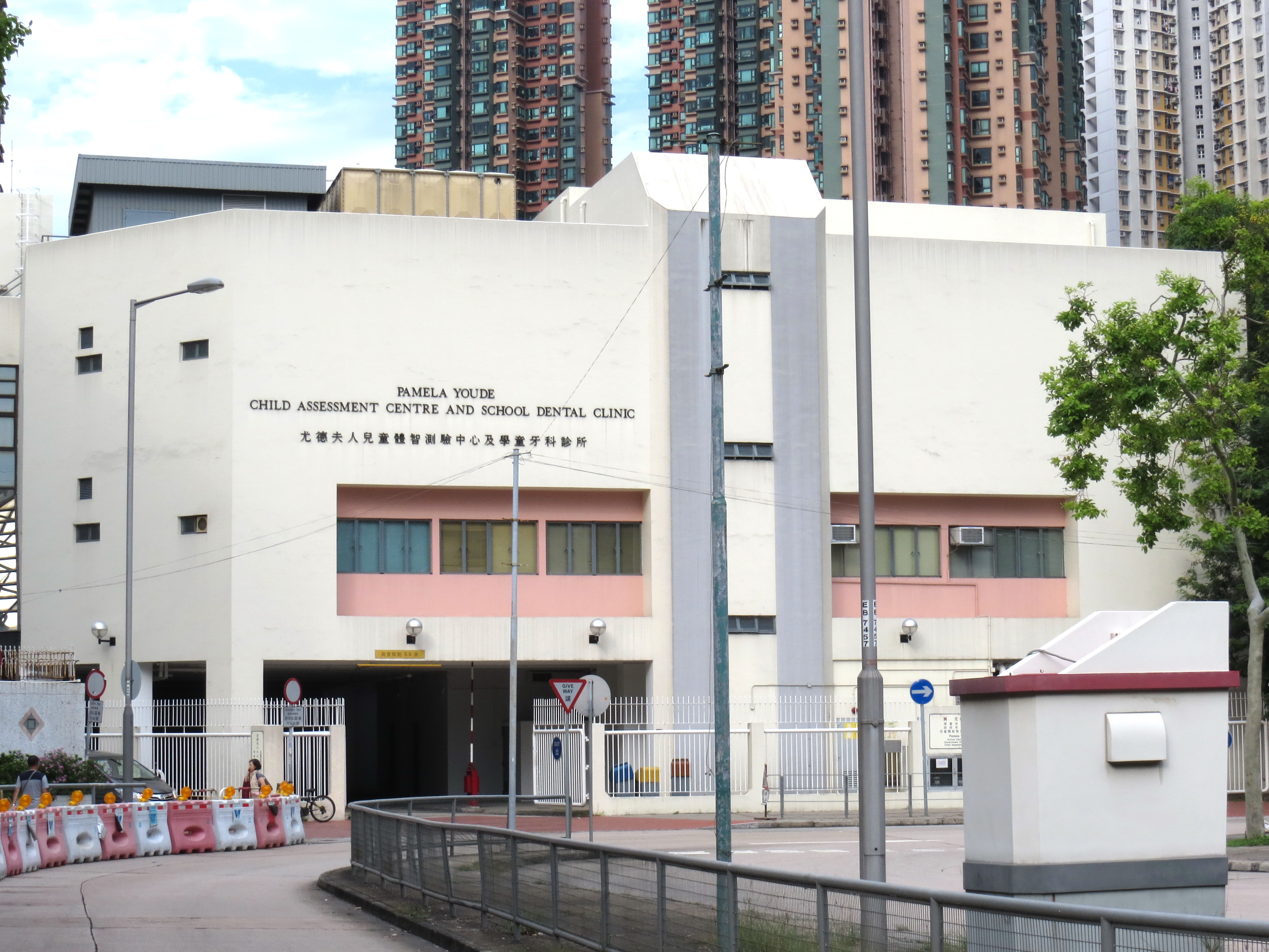
Pamela Youde Child Assessment Centre and
School Dental Clinic

In addition, the Kadoorie Agricultural Research Centre of the University of Hong Kong (later renamed the Kadoorie Farm and Botanic Garden) in Shek Kong, Yuen Long, also features a Lady Youde Hostel. The Centre was donated by Lord Lawrence Kadoorie and Sir Horace Kadoorie and opened in 1986, completing its expansion in 1988; it serves primarily as a regional base for agricultural, horticultural, and forestry research. The Lady Youde Hostel forms part of the expansion, and was unveiled on 26 February 1988 by Lady Youde, witnessed by the Kadoorie brothers and the then Vice-Chancellor of the University of Hong Kong Wang Gungwu.

Honorary titles
Preceded by None	Wife of the British Ambassador to China; 1974–1978	Succeeded by Lady Cradock
Preceded by Lady MacLehose	Wife of the Governor of Hong Kong; 1982–1986	Succeeded by Lady Wilson (from 1987)
Preceded by Lady MacLehose	President, Hong Kong Girl Guides Association; 1982–1986	Succeeded by Lady Wilson (from 1987)
Preceded by Michael Sandberg	President, The Community Chest of Hong Kong; 1983–1986	Succeeded by Lady Wilson (from 1987)
Academic offices
Preceded by Sir Geoffrey Lloyd	Chairman, Needham Research Institute Trust; 2002–2008	Succeeded by Sir John Boyd
