= Noël MacLehose, Baroness MacLehose of Beoch =

Wife of the 25th Governor of Hong Kong (1920–2020)

The Right Honourable The Lady MacLehose of Beoch
- Born: Margaret Noël Dunlop; 26 December 1920; Maybole, South Ayrshire, Scotland
- Died: 16 February 2020 (aged 99); Turnberry, South Ayrshire, Scotland
- Known for: Spouse of the 25th Governor of Hong Kong
- Spouse: Lord MacLehose of Beoch (m. 1947–2000)
- Children: 2 daughters (twins)

Margaret Noël MacLehose, Baroness MacLehose of Beoch CStJ (née Dunlop; 26 December 1920 – 16 February 2020), previously known as Lady MacLehose until 1982, was a Scottish noblewoman. She was the wife of Lord MacLehose of Beoch, the 25th Governor of Hong Kong (1971–1982), and served as the chief hostess of Government House, Hong Kong during his tenure.

Born into a prominent family in South Ayrshire, Scotland, she was the daughter of newspaper proprietor Sir Thomas Charles Dunlop. She married diplomat Crawford Murray MacLehose in 1947 and accompanied him on various overseas postings. During her more than ten years in Hong Kong as the governor's wife, she actively participated in public and official events while dedicating herself to social welfare. She served as president of the Community Chest of Hong Kong from 1971 to 1976. Several welfare facilities in Hong Kong, including the HKSKH Lady MacLehose Centre and the Hong Kong Riding for the Disabled Association Lady MacLehose Centre, are named after her.

Both she and her husband were passionate about the outdoors and hiking, and Lady MacLehose had a particular interest in botany and was well acquainted with Hong Kong flora. She supported the botanical research of Dr. Shiu-Ying Hu in Hong Kong. The MacLehose Trail and Lady MacLehose Holiday Village were named in honour of the couple, reflecting both the governor's initiatives and their shared enthusiasm for nature and walking.

== Early life and family ==
Margaret Noël Dunlop was born on 26 December 1920 at Sauchrie House, a country residence near Maybole, Ayrshire (now in South Ayrshire), Scotland. She was the youngest of five siblings. Her father, Sir Thomas Charles Dunlop, was a local landowner and newspaper proprietor who had served with the Ayrshire Yeomanry and the Royal Scots Fusiliers, attaining the honorary rank of colonel and receiving the Territorial Decoration. He was appointed Deputy Lieutenant of Ayrshire in 1930 and was knighted in the 1955 Queen's Birthday Honours for public service in the county.

Her mother was Elfrida Louise Grant Watson (d. 28 March 1946), daughter of Robert Grant Watson. Her siblings included:

- Frederick Hamilton Dunlop (10 November 1905 – 25 April 1955), a Royal Navy lieutenant colonel;
- William Herbert Dunlop (4 January 1907 – 1982), who succeeded their father in the newspaper business after attending Eton College and Trinity College, Cambridge;
- Phyllis Ernesta Dunlop (5 September 1908 – 28 October 1908), who died in infancy;
- Ruby Janette Dunlop (12 February 1910 – 3 November 2000), who married Lieutenant W. G. Smith of the Royal Scots Fusiliers in 1934.

== Marriage and diplomatic life ==
On 24 June 1947, Margaret Dunlop married Crawford Murray MacLehose, a diplomat whose father owned a printing works with business ties to her family. MacLehose, also a Scot, was originally an official in the Colonial Office. During the war he had been interned by the Japanese, and from 1944 to 1946 he served as Acting British Consul in Fuzhou. In 1947 he transferred to the Foreign Office, and from then on Lady MacLehose accompanied her husband in the itinerant life of a diplomat. She accompanied him on various diplomatic postings, including Hankou (China), Prague (Czechoslovakia), Wellington (New Zealand), Paris (France), Hong Kong, Saigon (South Vietnam), and Copenhagen (Denmark).

During MacLehose's posting as political adviser to the Hong Kong Government (1959–1962), Lady MacLehose taught at St. Paul's Convent School.

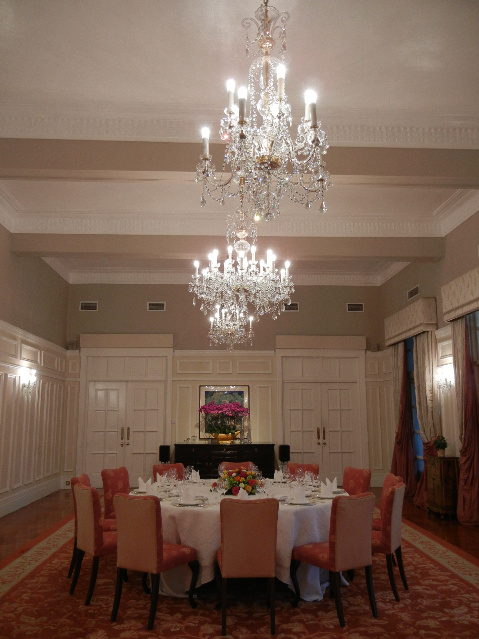
The Italian antique crystal chandelier in the dining room of Government House, Hong Kong.

=== Hong Kong (1971–1982) ===
Crawford MacLehose was appointed the 25th Governor of Hong Kong in 1971 and was created KCMG the same year, entitling his wife to be styled Lady MacLehose. She was appointed CStJ in 1972.

The couple arrived in Hong Kong on 19 November 1971 aboard Cathay Pacific flight CX501. As chatelaine of Government House, Hong Kong, she oversaw the household, replacing ceiling fans with antique Italian crystal chandeliers purchased from India. She also commissioned custom Canton porcelain tableware for Government House, a pattern later commercialised as "Governor's Flower".

Despite this, according to Shelley Lee, who served as MacLehose's private secretary during his governorship, the MacLehoses were in fact very frugal. Whenever her husband's shirts were damaged, Lady MacLehose would mend them herself for continued use. Although she was not an outgoing personality, she was kind-hearted and very considerate of the Government House staff. She proactively proposed a review of staff salaries, resulting in the first pay increase for employees whose wages had remained unchanged for many years. She frequently hosted guests and attended official functions with her husband, including the 1975 state visit by Queen Elizabeth II and the Duke of Edinburgh, and accompanied him to Beijing in 1979 to meet Deng Xiaoping.

=== Charity and community work ===
Lady MacLehose was honorary president of the Young Women's Christian Association of Hong Kong, chair of the Gurkha Welfare Committee, honorary patron of the Hong Kong Chinese Women's Club, and patron of the Hong Kong Women's Lawn Bowls Association. She served as president of the Community Chest of Hong Kong from 1971 to 1976, regularly visiting member agencies and participating in events such as the Community Chest Walk.

She visited schools and facilities, including the new wing of Duchess of Kent Children's Hospital (1973) and Chinese Manufacturers' Association Prevocational School (1977), and co-officiated the opening of the first section of the MTR (Kwun Tong to Shek Kip Mei) in 1979. The Hong Kong Sheng Kung Hui Lady MacLehose Centre, opened in 1973 under her auspices, was named in her honor.

She strongly supported therapeutic riding for disabled children. In 1974, at the request of the Hong Kong Junior Equestrian Club, she proposed establishing a riding-for-the-disabled association modelled on programmes in the United Kingdom and New Zealand. Supported by Jockey Club chairman Peter P. F. Woo and general manager General John Peyton, the association was founded in 1975 at the Jockey Club's Sheung Shui Beas River Country Club, initially borrowing mules from the British Forces Riding Club at Lo Wu.

She was actively involved in its early development and sought a permanent site. With support from Sir Peter Gordon and General Bernard Penfold, the Hong Kong Riding for the Disabled Association was founded in 1975. Lady MacLehose helped secure a permanent site at Pok Fu Lam Reservoir, where the Lady MacLehose Centre of the association was opened by her in 1979.

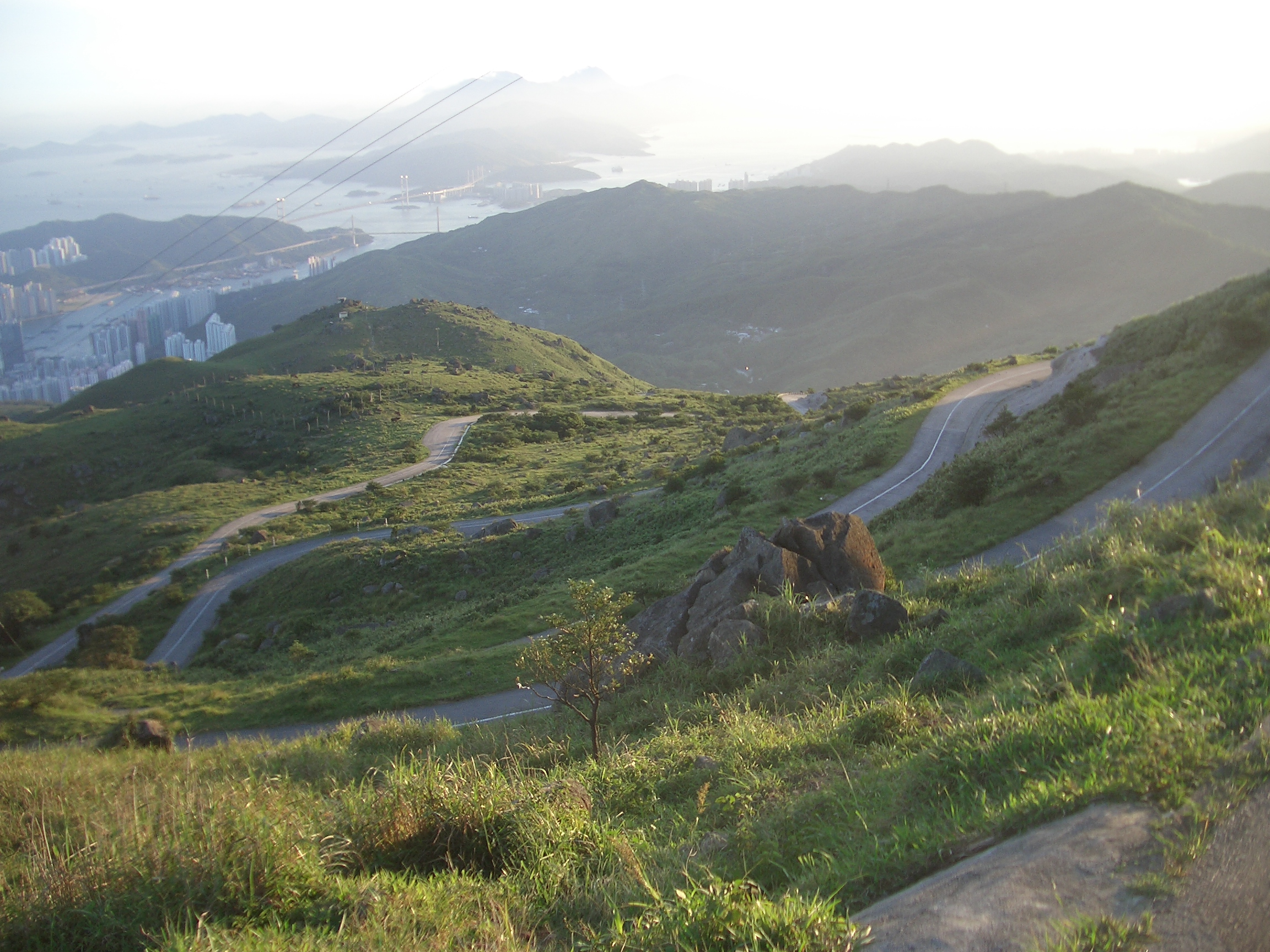
Scenery along a section of the MacLehose Trail near Tai Mo Shan Road

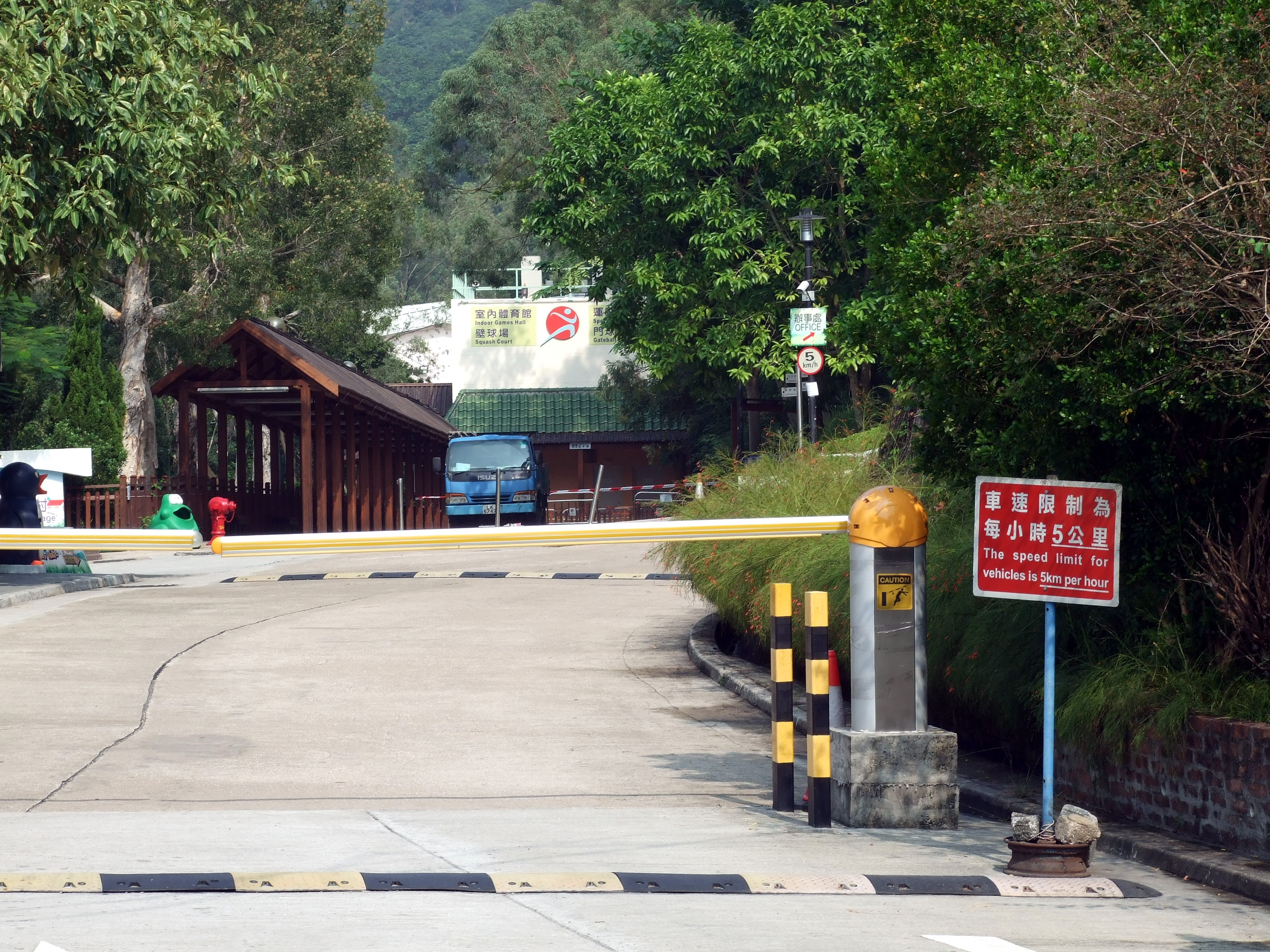
Lady MacLehose Holiday Village in Pak Tam Chung

=== Other activities ===
The MacLehoses shared a passion for the countryside and hiking; Lady MacLehose was especially interested in botany and familiar with Hong Kong's flora from their earlier stay (1959–1962). She often introduced visiting guests to Hong Kong plants.

She supported Dr. Shiu-Ying Hu's botanical research in Hong Kong, arranging police launches for fieldwork and joining expeditions to remote areas, including military restricted zones.

Outside Hong Kong, she visited Gangtok in the Himalayas (1977) and climbed Mount Wuyi in Fujian at Chinese invitation (1988).

In recognition of their love of hiking, the government named the 100 km MacLehose Trail after the couple in 1979. In 1981, with a HK$2 million donation from Sir Shiu-Kin Tang, the Lady MacLehose Holiday Village was built at Pak Tam Chung, Sai Kung, and opened by Lady MacLehose on 8 January 1981.

== Later life ==
The MacLehose couple lived in Hong Kong for more than 10 years. During this period, her husband, who served as Governor, successfully and significantly improved the standard of living in Hong Kong, earning him widespread support from the local population. On May 8, 1982, Lady MacLehose finally bid farewell to Government House alongside her husband, the outgoing Governor. That evening, they traveled by official car to Queen's Pier, passing through Garden Road, Des Voeux Road Central, Pedder Street, and Connaught Road Central. Crowds of citizens lined the route cheering enthusiastically, while the MacLehoses waved in grateful acknowledgment from the car.

Upon arriving at Edinburgh Place near Queen's Pier, the MacLehoses attended a simple yet solemn farewell ceremony. They shook hands and said goodbye to the assembled Executive and Legislative Council members, as well as prominent figures from various sectors of society who had come to see them off. As the Royal Hong Kong Police Band played "Auld Lang Syne," the couple boarded the Lady Maurine (慕莲夫人号) and slowly crossed Victoria Harbour. After disembarking at the Kowloon Public Pier, they once again shook hands with the large crowd waiting there, once more demonstrating their approachable and people-friendly style. They then transferred to a special car heading to Kai Tak Airport. Along the way, huge crowds gathered to bid them farewell. Finally, at 9:00 p.m., they departed Hong Kong on British Airways Flight BA20, a Boeing 747, traveling via Abu Dhabi back to London.

Sir Murray MacLehose served as Governor from November 1971 until May 1982, a tenure of 10 years and 6 months—the longest in Hong Kong's history. As a result, Lady MacLehose also became the longest-serving Governor's wife in Hong Kong's history. On May 21, 1982, Murray MacLehose was created a life peer by the British Crown, becoming Baron MacLehose of Beoch (commonly referred to as Lord MacLehose). Consequently, his wife became known as Lady MacLehose of Beoch (or Baroness MacLehose of Beoch).

=== Return to the United Kingdom and Settlement ===
After returning to the United Kingdom with her husband, Lady MacLehose settled back in her hometown of Maybole in South Ayrshire, Scotland. They resided in a house in the suburb of Beoch, where in their leisure time they lived a relaxed life tending to sheep on the property. On October 2, 1988, while walking her dog in a wooded area about 2 miles from their home, Lady MacLehose tripped over an object in a ditch. She soon discovered that what had caused her to stumble was the body of a young boy. She immediately returned home and called the police for assistance.

Investigation later confirmed that the deceased was five-year-old Stephen McKerron, who had gone missing 16 days earlier on September 17. Stephen had traveled with his aunt and uncle to a holiday camp in Ayrshire on September 17 for a vacation, but he disappeared shortly after arriving at the camp. Scottish police mobilized more than 140 officers for an extensive ground search within a 2-mile radius of the camp over several days. They also requested the Royal Air Force to deploy a helicopter equipped with infrared detection equipment for aerial searches. Camp staff and numerous local citizens joined the effort, but despite the large-scale operation, no trace of him was found.

At the fatal accident inquiry held at the end of March the following year, eyewitnesses gave conflicting accounts. Some claimed to have seen Stephen being led away by an unidentified man, and one driver reported seeing the boy walking hand-in-hand with a man on the road. However, other witnesses insisted they saw Stephen climbing alone over a 6-foot-high fence to leave the holiday camp. With testimonies varying widely and the body already in a state of decomposition when discovered, forensic examination could not confirm any obvious injuries. It was concluded that he had died from exposure outdoors. The inquiry ruled out murder and returned a verdict of death by misadventure. Nevertheless, many unanswered questions remained. For instance, when Lady MacLehose found the body, Stephen's original socks were in his trouser pocket, yet he was still wearing his sports shoes, which were tied with knots he could not have made himself. Additionally, the location where the body was found was 4.6 miles from the holiday camp where he disappeared. How a five-year-old could have traveled such a distance—or whether an unidentified third party had taken him there—could not be conclusively determined by the police.

=== Later years ===
In his later years, Lady MacLehose's husband continued to engage in politics through the House of Lords, maintaining a keen interest in Hong Kong's future. When many of his former colleagues and subordinates from Hong Kong visited the United Kingdom, they would often make a point of stopping by to see the couple. Among them was Shelley Lee, who had served as his private secretary and later as Director of Home Affairs; she made annual special trips to the United Kingdom to visit them right up until his death, keeping them informed of the latest developments in Hong Kong. After her husband passed away on May 27, 2000, Lady MacLehose made a special return to Hong Kong that year to attend a memorial service at St. John's Cathedral in Central. There, she received condolences from then-Chief Executive Tung Chee-hwa and other government officials, and she also took the opportunity to reunite with old friends from various sectors of Hong Kong society. In 2005, she visited Hong Kong again to attend the 25th silver jubilee celebration of the Hong Kong Riding for the Disabled Association, which she had founded. Thereafter, she lived a quiet life in Maybole, South Ayrshire, maintaining correspondence with friends such as Shelley Lee.

From a young age, Lady MacLehose had a love for plants and nature, and gardening became one of her major interests in later life. Drawing on the horticultural knowledge and skills she had accumulated from living in various places overseas, she carefully selected plants from different regions for her garden at home, along with ornamental trees and shrubs. Despite Scotland's harsh climate, with her dedicated care, these plants thrived remarkably in her garden, creating a spectacular display. She also established the Ayrshire group of Plant Heritage (formerly the National Council for the Conservation of Plants and Gardens) and served as its honorary president. As the first representative from Scotland on the National Council for the Conservation of Plants and Gardens, she helped establish its Ayrshire & Arran group as well as Scotland's Garden Scheme under her encouragement. In recognition of her support for horticultural development in Scotland, she was awarded the Queen Elizabeth The Queen Mother Medal by the Royal Caledonian Horticultural Society in 2004.

Beginning in 2018, Lady MacLehose suffered from dementia. Due to her advanced age and reduced mobility, she moved into Malin Court care home in nearby Turnberry. However, she was deeply saddened because the facility did not allow her to keep her beloved pet dogs. On February 16, 2020, Lady MacLehose passed away peacefully at Malin Court at the age of 99. A thanksgiving service was held on February 26 at St Oswald's Episcopal Church in her hometown of Maybole. Following her death, then-Chief Executive of Hong Kong Carrie Lam issued a special statement expressing profound condolences, praising her for having been "always enthusiastic about local community and public welfare affairs, showing care for the community" during her time in Hong Kong.

== Personal life ==
Lady MacLehose married her husband on June 24, 1947. Lord MacLehose (October 16, 1917 – May 27, 2000) was from Ayrshire; his parents were Hamish Alexander MacLehose (1886–1962) and Margaret Bruce Black. His father ran a printing company in Campsie Glen, Stirlingshire, and served as major in the 8th Battalion, Scottish Rifles during WWI. The couple had twin daughters in 1949:

- Elfrida Sandra: In 1971, she married Martin Amery Wedgwood (1936–2010), a descendant of the master potter Josiah Wedgwood. Martin served in the military before managing the family business, which manufactured large-scale marine components; he also served as Deputy Lieutenant of Dunbartonshire. Elfrida and Martin had two children, Richard and Lois. Elfrida passed away in 2007.
- Sylvia Margaret: In 1970, she married Ronald Leighton Sandeman (b. 1944), whose business specialized in automotive rustproofing. They had one daughter, Emma. In early 1974, while five months pregnant, Sylvia was involved in a head-on collision in Scotland caused by another car swerving into her lane. Although the unborn child was unharmed, Sylvia was left permanently paralyzed from the waist down. Following the accident, she became a prominent disability rights advocate in Scotland. Her extensive public service included roles on the Scottish Sports Council, the Scottish Council on Disability, and the Scottish Consumer Council. She served as Vice-Chair of the Scottish Sports Association for Disabled People, Chair of the Scottish Paraplegic Association, and Chief Executive of both the Queen Elizabeth National Spinal Injuries Unit in Glasgow and Spinal Injuries Scotland. In 1981, she was named "Scottish Disabled Person of the Year," and in 2010, she was received by Princess Anne in recognition of her advocacy work. Despite using a wheelchair, she and her husband remained avid sailors and members of the Royal Yachting Association.

During her time as the Governor's consort in Hong Kong, Lady MacLehose was known for her prematurely silver-white hair. Although not short, she was often dwarfed by her exceptionally tall husband. Both were devoted hickers and lovers of the countryside, and Lady MacLehose possessed a deep interest in botany. Her lifelong nickname was "Squeak."

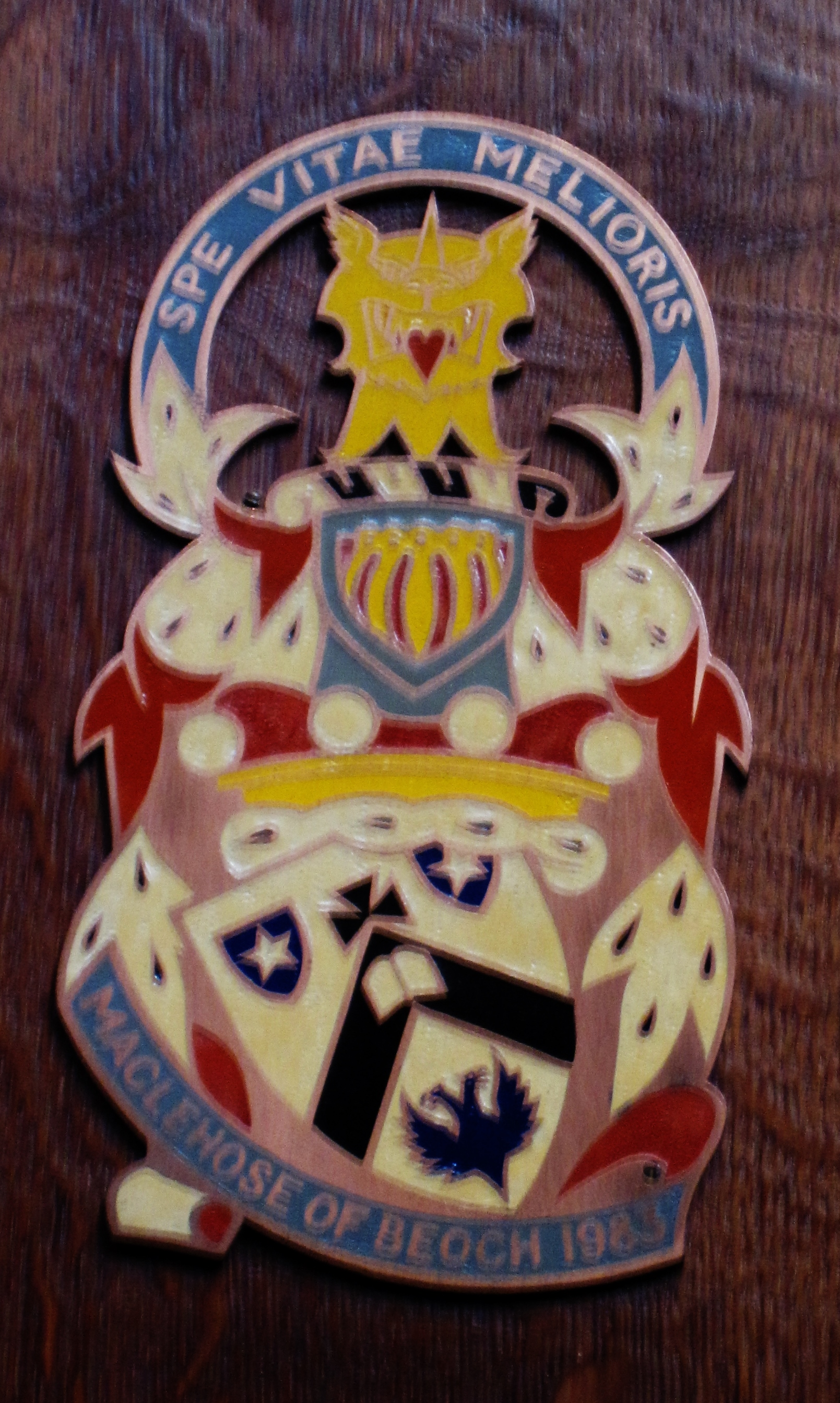
The coat of arms of Lord MacLehose, displayed in the Thistle Chapel within St Giles' Cathedral, Edinburgh

== Honours ==
- Commander of the Order of St John (CStJ) – 17 February 1972
- Queen Mother Elizabeth Medal – 2004

== Titles ==
- Miss Margaret Noël Dunlop (1920–1947)
- Mrs. M. Noël MacLehose (1947–1971)
- Lady MacLehose (1971–1972)
- Lady MacLehose, CStJ (1972–1982)
- The Lady MacLehose of Beoch, CStJ (1982–2020)

== Legacy ==
- HKSKH Lady MacLehose Centre. A community centre on Wo Yi Hop Road, Kwai Chung, opened in 1973.
- Hong Kong Riding for the Disabled Association Lady MacLehose Centre. Located on Pok Fu Lam Reservoir Road, opened in 1979.
- Lady MacLehose Holiday Village. A recreational facility in Sai Kung West Country Park, Pak Tam Chung, opened in 1981.

== See also ==
- Murray MacLehose, Baron MacLehose of Beoch
- Government House, Hong Kong
- The Community Chest of Hong Kong
- MacLehose Trail
- Shelley Lee

== Bibliography ==
=== English sources ===
- Burke, Sir Bernard, and Pirie-Gordon, Charles Harry Clinton, A Genealogical and Heraldic History of the Landed Gentry. UK: Burke Pub. Co., 1937.
- "Mother's plea over 'special school'", The Herald, 3 February 1981. (Archived from the original on 2 March 2020)
- "Scottish Consumer Council", Hansard. Great Britain: House of Commons, 31 October 1984. (Archived from the original on 2 March 2020)
- Jennifer, Cunningham, "Injuries that make every day a challenge", The Herald, 3 October 1986. (Archived from the original on 2 March 2020)
- "Witnesses tell of man holding hands with boy from Butlin's", The Herald, 29 March 1989. (Archived from the original on 2 March 2020)
- "Lessons learned from search that failed to save boy", The Herald, 30 March 1989. (Archived from the original on 2 March 2020)
- McCallum, Andrew, "Foul play ruled out in death of wandering boy", The Herald, 1 April 1989. (Archived from the original on 2 March 2020)
- Whiteley, Adrian, "A Visit to the Wuyi Mountains", Rhododendrons 1990 with Camellias and Magnolias No. 43. Royal Horticultural Society, 1990.
- Stokes, Edward, Hong Kong's Wild Places: An Environmental Exploration. Oxford University Press, 1995.
- Spurr, Russell, Excellency: The Governors of Hong Kong. Hong Kong: FormAsia, 1995.
- 30th Anniversary Souvenir Programme. Hong Kong: Hong Kong Community Chest, 1998. (Archived from the original on 24 May 2010)
- Cross, Charles T., Born a Foreigner: A Memoir of the American Presence in Asia. Rowman & Littlefield, 1999. (Archived from the original on 2 March 2020)
- "Lord MacLehose of Beoch", The Telegraph, 1 June 2000. (Archived from the original on 2 March 2020)
- Fang, Sir Harry Sinyang, and, Jeffery, Lawrence, Rehabilitation: A Life's Work. Hong Kong: Hong Kong University Press, 2002. (Archived from the original on 2 March 2020)
- Lang, David, Sikkim Himalaya: Travels in the Cloud Kingdom. Pomegranate, 2003.
- Donald, Sir Alan, "MacLehose, (Crawford) Murray, Baron MacLehose of Beoch", Dictionary of National Biographies. Oxford: OUP, 5th edition, 2004.
- Hu, Shiu-Ying, Food Plants of China. Hong Kong: Chinese University Press, 2005. (Archived from the original on 2 March 2020)
- Moss, Peter, No Babylon: A Hong Kong Scrapbook. iUniverse, 2006. (Archived from the original on 2 March 2020)
- "Architecture", Government House. HK: HKSAR Government, 2006. (Archived from the original on 26 January 2013)
- Cox, Peter, and Hutchison, Peter, Seeds of Adventure: In Search of Plants. Garden Art Press, 2008.
- The Salopian no. 146. Shrewsbury: Shrewsbury School, June 2010. (Archived from the original on 24 December 2013)
- "BVI House", geoffgolt.com, July 2010. (Archived from the original on 24 December 2013)
- Sandeman, Sylvia, "50th ANNIVERSARY OF SIS", Newsline Winter 2010. Glasgow: Spinal Injuries Scotland, 2010, pp. 7–13.
- "The case I can't forget", Daily Record, 20 May 2012. (Archived from the original on 2 March 2020)
- Brickley, Richard, Scottish Disability Sport - The First Fifty Years. United Kingdom: Scottish Disability Sport, 2013. (Archived from the original on 2 March 2020)
- "MACLEHOSE OF BEOCH", Daily Telegraph, 19 February 2020. (Archived from the original on 2 March 2020)
- Houston, Stephen, "Obituary: Lady MacLehose of Beoch", Ayrshire Post, 26 February 2020, p. 4.
- Close, Rob, "Two Hundred Years of the Ayr Advertiser (part 3)", Ayrshire History, retrieved on 6 November 2012. (Archived from the original on 2 March 2020)

=== Chinese sources ===
- 港督夫人任啹喀兵慈善會主席 ("Governor's wife serves as chairman of Gurkha Soldiers' Charity"), Kung Sheung Daily News, p. 11, 4 December 1971.
- 港督夫人訪問中國婦女會 ("Governor's wife visits Chinese Women's Association"), Kung Sheung Daily News, p. 10, 9 February 1972.
- 港督麥理浩爵士夫人巡視三個香港公益金會員機構 ("Lady MacLehose, wife of Governor Sir Murray MacLehose, visits three member agencies of the Community Chest of Hong Kong"), Wah Kiu Yat Po, sheet 4, p. 1, 24 March 1972.
- 四中學畢業禮 ("Graduation ceremony of four secondary schools"), Wah Kiu Yat Po, sheet 4, p. 4, 24 November 1972.
- 聖公會在葵涌設麥理浩夫人中心 ("Sheng Kung Hui establishes Lady MacLehose Centre in Kwai Chung"), Wah Kiu Yat Po, sheet 3, p. 1, 15 April 1973.
- 麥理浩夫人訪公益機構 ("Lady MacLehose visits charitable organizations"), Wah Kiu Yat Po, sheet 2, p. 3, 10 July 1973.
- 港督麥理浩夫人由副教育司陪同訪浸會學院 ("Lady MacLehose, accompanied by the Deputy Director of Education, visits Baptist College"), Wah Kiu Yat Po, sheet 4, p. 1, 13 December 1973.
- 女皇伉儷抵港訪問，市民夾道爭瞻風采 ("The Queen and her husband arrive in Hong Kong for a visit, citizens line the streets to catch a glimpse"), Kung Sheung Daily News, p. 1, 5 May 1975.
- 麥理浩爵士夫人參觀事工展覽 ("Lady MacLehose visits the works exhibition"), Wah Kiu Yat Po, sheet 3, p. 4, 10 May 1975.
- 兒童骨科醫院揭幕，港督麥理浩夫人昨日主持儀式 ("Children's Orthopaedic Hospital inauguration, Lady MacLehose presided over the ceremony yesterday"), Ta Kung Pao, p. 5, 7 October 1975.
- 廠商會職業先修學校昨由麥理浩夫人揭幕 ("CMA Pre-vocational School inaugurated by Lady MacLehose yesterday"), Ta Kung Pao, p. 5, 4 October 1977.
- 港督麥理浩夫人主持首個家庭渡假村開幕禮 ("Lady MacLehose presides over the opening ceremony of the first family holiday village"), Kung Sheung Daily News, p. 6, 9 January 1981.
- 香港總督麥理浩爵士 (Governor of Hong Kong Sir Murray MacLehose). Hong Kong: Ming Pao, 1982.
- 港督離港場面感人，市民夾道鼓掌歡送 ("Touching scene of Governor leaving Hong Kong, citizens line the streets and applaud to bid farewell"), Wah Kiu Yat Po, sheet 2, p. 1, 9 May 1982.
- 福建省志：武夷山志 (Fujian Provincial Gazetteer: Wuyishan Gazetteer). Fujian People's Publishing House, 1992.
- 麥理浩：掀起香港廉政風暴 ("MacLehose: Sparking the Hong Kong Anti-Corruption Storm"), Sing Tao Global Network, 14 June 2006. (Archived from the original on 26 November 2009)
- 九七大限 ("The 1997 Deadline"), Hong Kong Decoded, episode 33. Hong Kong: Asia Television, 2007. (Archived from the original on 3 February 2012)
- 香港傷健策騎協會三十三週年會刊 (Riding for the Disabled Association of Hong Kong 33rd Anniversary Journal). Hong Kong: Riding for the Disabled Association of Hong Kong Limited, 2008. (Archived from the original on 2 April 2015)
- 前港督麥理浩夫人離世 享年99歲 ("Wife of former Hong Kong Governor MacLehose passes away at age 99"), Bastille Post, 21 February 2020. (Archived from the original on 2 March 2020)
- 麥理浩夫人鄧麗娉逝世 李麗娟：為人害羞但對港督府職員相當有心 ("Lady MacLehose, Noël Dunlop, passes away; Carrie Lam: Shy but very caring towards Government House staff"), Ming Pao News, 21 February 2020. (Archived from the original on 2 March 2020)
- 行政長官哀悼麥理浩勳爵夫人逝世 ("Chief Executive mourns the passing of Lady MacLehose"), Press Releases. Hong Kong: HKSAR Government, 21 February 2020. (Archived from the original on 3 April 2021)
- 向大自然敬禮 ("Salute to Nature"), Enjoy Hiking. Hong Kong: Agriculture, Fisheries and Conservation Department and Friends of the Country Parks, accessed on 6 November 2012. (Archived from the original on 24 January 2013)
- 傷健策騎協會歷史 ("History of the Riding for the Disabled Association"), Hong Kong: Riding for the Disabled Association of Hong Kong Limited, accessed on 17 November 2013. (Archived from the original on 10 June 2015)

Honorary titles
Preceded by Lady Trench	Governor's consort of Hong Kong; 1971–1982	Succeeded by Lady Youde
Preceded by Lady Trench	President of Hong Kong Girl Guides Association; 1971–1982	Succeeded by Lady Youde
Preceded by Lady Trench	President of The Community Chest of Hong Kong; 1971–1976	Succeeded by Lady Fung Shiu-kin
