= Chinese Annals of History of Science and Technology =

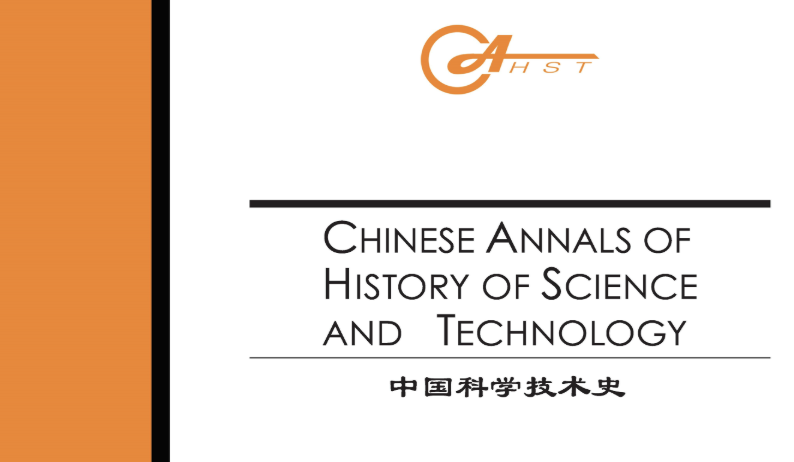
- CAHST
- Discipline: History of science, History of technology
- Language: English
- Edited by: Zhang Baichun, Jürgen Renn

Publication details
- History: 2017–present
- Publisher: China Science Publishing & Media (China)
- Frequency: Biannual
- Open access: Yes
- Impact factor: 0.5 (2024)

Standard abbreviations
- ISO 4: Chin. Ann. Hist. Sci. Technol.

Indexing
- ISSN: 2096-4226
- LCCN: 2017202353
- OCLC no.: 1005820421

Links
- Journal homepage

The Chinese Annals of History of Science and Technology is a biannual peer-reviewed academic journal focusing on the history of science and technology related to China. It is published by the Institute for the History of Natural Sciences of the Chinese Academy of Sciences and China Science Publishing & Media. The journal publishes research articles and reviews, including specific studies of original documents and archaeological findings. It also publishes book reviews, review essays on previous research, current debates and controversies on historiography or methodology, and news on the history of science and technology. The journal aims to make each issue thematic, with articles focusing on a more or less homogeneous topic. The editors-in-chief are Zhang Baichun and Jürgen Renn (Max Planck Institute for the History of Science).

== Abstracted and indexed ==
The journal is abstracted and indexed in Scopus.

== See also ==
- Sinology
