= Institute for the History of Natural Sciences =

Institute for the History of Natural Sciences, CAS
- 中国科学院自然科学史研究所
- Founded at: Beijing
- Type: Research institute
- Location: Beijing, China
- Parent organization: Chinese Academy of Sciences
- Website: http://english.ihns.cas.cn/

The Institute for the History of Natural Sciences (IHNS CAS; Chinese: 中国科学院自然科学史研究所; pinyin: Zhōngguó Kēxuéyuàn Zìrán Kēxuéshǐ Yánjiūsuǒ) is a leading research institution in China dedicated to the study of the history of science, technology, and medicine. It is affiliated with the Chinese Academy of Sciences (CAS).

== History ==
The Institute for the History of Natural Sciences was founded in 1957 with the active involvement of the renowned British biochemist and historian of science Joseph Needham (Chinese: 李约瑟, Lǐ Yuēsè) and a group of Chinese scholars. Its establishment was initiated to systematically research China's rich scientific and technological heritage and its place in world history. Initially, the institute was located in the Gulou district of Beijing.

== Research Focus ==
The institute's primary mission is to conduct fundamental and applied research on the history of science and technology in China and the world, and to promote the development of this discipline.

Key research areas include:

- History of Science and Technology in China: Studying traditional Chinese science, technology, medicine, astronomy, mathematics, and their interaction with society and culture.
- History of World Science: Comparative studies, history of scientific exchanges, study of the Scientific Revolution and the development of modern science.
- Theoretical Studies in History of Science: Methodology, philosophy, and sociology of science.
- Preservation of Scientific and Technological Heritage: Identifying and researching tangible and intangible objects of scientific and technological heritage.
- Science, Technology and Society (STS): Investigating the interrelations between scientific/technological progress and social development.

The IHNS plays a central role in developing and institutionalizing the history of science as an academic discipline in China. Its research contributes significantly to the global understanding of the history of science and highlights China's contributions to scientific and technological development.

== Structure ==
The institute comprises several research departments (实验室) and centers (中心):

- Department of Ancient Science History
- Department of Modern Science History
- Department of History of Technology
- Department of History of Medicine
- Center for the Study of Scientific Heritage
- Center for Science, Technology and Society (STS)

The institute also hosts the Chinese Society for the History of Science and Technology (CSHST; 中国科学技术史学会), the main professional association in this field in China.

== Publications ==
The institute is a leading publisher of academic literature on the history of science:

- Chinese Annals of History of Science and Technology (中国科学技术史)
- Studies in the History of Natural Sciences (SHNS; 自然科学史研究)
- The multi-volume General History of Science and Technology in China
- The series Studies in the History of Western Science.
- Translations of classic works of world historiography of science.

== International Cooperation ==
IHNS actively develops international connections, participating in joint research projects and academic exchanges. The institute collaborates with leading centers for the history of science worldwide, including:

- S.I. Vavilov Institute for the History of Science and Technology RAS (Russia)
- Max Planck Institute for the History of Science (Germany)
- Harvard University (USA)
- University of Cambridge (UK)
- Université Paris Cité (France)

== Leadership ==
Notable former directors of the institute include historians of science:

- Xi Zezong (席泽宗)
- Chen Jianqiu (陈建勛).

== See also ==
- Chinese Academy of Sciences
- History of science and technology in China
- Joseph Needham
- Chinese Society for the History of Science and Technology
