= Great Britain–China Centre =

Coordinates: 51.4986°N 0.1552°W

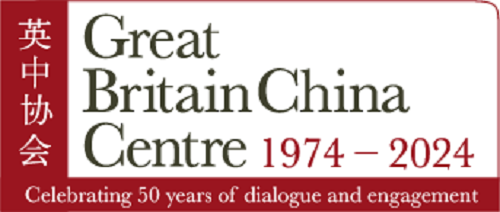
Great Britain–China Centre

The Great Britain–China Centre (GBCC) is an executive non-departmental public body of the Foreign, Commonwealth and Development Office. It was set up by the British government in 1974 to foster understanding and cooperation between the United Kingdom and the People's Republic of China. The GBCC is located in Belgrave Square in central London.
