= The Community Chest of Hong Kong =

Hong Kong non-governmental organization

- Established: 1968
- Type: Non-governmental organization
- Location: Hong Kong
- Website: www.commchest.org

The Community Chest of Hong Kong
- Chinese: 香港公益金
Transcriptions
Standard Mandarin
- Hanyu Pinyin: Xiānggǎng Gōngyìjīn
Yue: Cantonese
- Jyutping: hoeng1 gong2 gung1 jik1 gam1

The Community Chest of Hong Kong (Chinese: 香港公益金) is an independent, nonprofit organization established on 8 November 1968 in Hong Kong. The Community Chest serves as an umbrella organization to provide grants to a wide range of community projects.

== Vision ==
The goal of The Community Chest is to work for the betterment of Hong Kong through the support by millions and to build a caring society through greater participation and giving by the Hong Kong community.

== Mission ==
The mission statements of the Community Chest are:

- to obtain donations through community wide appeals on behalf of member social welfare agencies;
- to act as trustee of the donors and allocate funds raised prudently to member agencies to strengthen and maximize their services to the needy;
- to provide an integrated service for donors wishing to support a wide range of welfare services in Hong Kong.

== Administration ==
The Community Chest is governed by a Board. Under the Board, there are four main committees: the Executive Committee, the Campaign Committee, the Public Relations Committee and the Admissions, Budgets and Allocations Committee. Over 300 volunteers serving on various sub-committees contribute to support the work of these committees. They also work with the 40 staff at the Chest office to accomplish their fundraising target each year and allocate these funds to over 140 social welfare agencies.

Each year, more than 1.7 million needy people benefit from the fundraising programs organized by the Chest. The Chest's administrative costs are subsidized by an annual grant from The Hong Kong Jockey Club, and by returns on investments. Therefore, the Chest is able to allocate 100% of the donations it receives to the beneficiaries without any deduction for administrative expenses.

== Member agencies ==
There are over 168 member agencies of the Chest in 2023. They are:

- 1st Step Association Limited
- Aberdeen Kai-fong Welfare Association Social Service Center
- Adventure Ship Limited
- Against Child Abuse Limited
- Agency for Volunteer Service
- Art in Hospital
- Asbury Methodist Social Service
- Asian Outreach Hong Kong Limited
- Association Concerning Sexual Violence Against Women
- Association for Engineering and Medical Volunteer Services
- Association for the Rights of Industrial Accident Victims Limited
- Baptist Mid-Missions
- Baptist Oi Kwan Social Service
- Barnabas Charitable Service Association Limited
- Benji's Center Limited
- Bo Charity Foundation Limited
- Boys' Brigade, Hong Kong, The
- Breakthrough (Juvenile Development) Limited
- Buddhist Li Ka Shing Care and Attention Home for the Elderly
- Buddhist Po Ching Care and Attention Home for the Aged Women
- Buddhist Po Ching Home for the Aged Women
- Canossian Missions
- Care For Your Heart
- Caritas – Hong Kong
- Centre for Restoration of Human Relationships Limited
- Chain of Charity Movement
- Changing Young Lives Foundation
- Children Chiropractic Foundation Limited
- Chinese YMCA of Hong Kong
- Christian Action
- Christian and Missionary Alliance Church Union Hong Kong Limited
- Christian Concern for the Homeless Association
- Christian Family Service Centre
- Christian Fellowship of Pastoral Care for Youth, Limited
- Christian Nationals' Evangelism Commission Aged People Centre
- Christian Oi Hip Fellowship Limited
- Church of God Limited
- Church of United Brethren in Christ, Social Service Division, The
- Comfort Care Concern Group
- Community CareAge Foundation Limited
- Community Drug Advisory Council
- Direction Association for the Handicapped
- Ebenezer School and Home for the Visually Impaired Limited
- Evangel Children's Home
- Evangelical Free Church of China Social Service Limited
- Evangelical Lutheran Church Social Service – Hong Kong
- Evangelize China Fellowship Shatin Canaan Church Limited
- Family Planning Association of Hong Kong, The
- Feeding Hong Kong Limited
- Finnish Evangelical Lutheran Mission
- Food For Good Limited
- Free Methodist Church of Hong Kong, The
- Girls' Brigade Hong Kong, The
- H.K.S.K.H. Lady Maclehose Centre
- Hans Andersen Club Limited
- Harmony House Limited
- Haven of Hope Christian Service
- Heep Hong Society
- Helping Hand
- Hong Chi Pinehill Village
- Hong Kong ABWE Social Services
- Hong Kong Air Cadet Corps
- Hong Kong Alzheimer's Disease Association
- Hong Kong Anti-Cancer Society, The
- Hong Kong Award for Young People, The
- Hong Kong Blind Union
- Hong Kong Breast Cancer Foundation Limited
- Hong Kong Catholic Marriage Advisory Council
- Hong Kong Children and Youth Services
- Hong Kong Christian Industrial Committee
- Hong Kong Christian Mutual Improvement Society
- Hong Kong Christian Service
- Hong Kong Council of Social Service
- Hong Kong Down Syndrome Association, The
- Hong Kong Eating Disorders Association Limited
- Hong Kong Employment Development Service Limited
- Hong Kong Evangelical Church Social Service Limited
- Hong Kong Family Welfare Society
- Hong Kong Federation of the Blind
- Hong Kong Federation of Women's Centres Limited
- Hong Kong Federation of Youth Groups, The
- Hong Kong Guide Dogs Association Limited
- Hong Kong Joint Council of Parents of the Mentally Handicapped, The
- Hong Kong Kidney Foundation Limited
- Hong Kong Lutheran Social Service Lutheran Church – Hong Kong Synod
- Hong Kong Neuro-Muscular Disease Association
- Hong Kong PHAB Association
- Hong Kong Red Cross
- Hong Kong Rehabilitation Power
- Hong Kong Sea Cadet Corps
- Hong Kong Seeing Eye Dog Services Limited
- Hong Kong Sheng Kung Hui Welfare Council Limited (and 1 Associated Agency)
- Hong Kong Single Parents Association
- Hong Kong Society for Rehabilitation, The
- Hong Kong Society for the Aged, The
- Hong Kong Society for the Blind, The
- Hong Kong Society for the Deaf, The
- Hong Kong Sports Association for the Physically Disabled
- Hong Kong St. John Ambulance
- Hong Kong Stoma Association Limited
- Hong Kong Student Aid Society Limited, The
- Hong Kong Wheelchair Aid Service Limited
- Hong Kong Workers' Health Centre Limited
- Industrial Evangelistic Fellowship Limited
- International Church of the Foursquare Gospel – Hong Kong District Limited
- International Social Service, Hong Kong Branch
- KELY Support Group Limited
- Light And Love Home Limited
- Lok Chi Association Limited
- Love 21 Foundation Limited
- Maryknoll Sisters Social Service
- Mental Health Association of Hong Kong, The
- Methodist Ap Lei Chau Centre, The
- Methodist Church Hong Kong – Kwun Tong Methodist Social Service, The
- Methodist Epworth Village Community Centre
- Mission Covenant Church Limited, Yiu on Neighbourhood Elderly Centre, The
- Mother's Choice Limited
- Neighbourhood Advice-Action Council, The
- New Life Psychiatric Rehabilitation Association
- New Voice Club of Hong Kong Limited, The
- North Point Kai-fong Welfare Advancement Association, The
- Pathways Foundation Limited, The
- Pentecostal Church of Hong Kong
- Pentecostal Holiness Church Ling Kwong Bradbury Centre for the Blind
- People Service Centre Limited
- Playwright Children's Play Association
- Pneumoconiosis Mutual Aid Association
- Precious Blood Children's Village
- Project Care
- Project Concern Hong Kong
- FainLily
- Regeneration Society Limited
- Rehabaid Society
- Rehabilitation Alliance Hong Kong
- Resource The Counselling Centre Limited
- Richmond Fellowship of Hong Kong
- SAHK
- Sai Kung District Community Centre Limited
- Salvation Army, The
- Samaritan Befrienders Hong Kong, The
- Samaritans, The
- Sham Shui Po Community Association Limited
- Sheng Kung Hui St Christopher's Home Limited
- Silence Limited
- Sisters of the Good Shepherd
- SKH Calvary Church Social Service Centre
- Society for AIDS Care Limited, The
- Society for Community Organization Limited
- Society for the Aid and Rehabilitation of Drug Abusers, The
- Society of Boys' Centres
- Society of Rehabilitation and Crime Prevention, Hong Kong, The
- Society of St. Vincent de Paul Central Council of Hong Kong
- South Kwai Chung Social Service
- St. James' Settlement
- Stewards
- Street Sleepers' Shelter Society Trustees Incorporated
- Suen Mei Speech and Hearing Centre
- Suicide Prevention Services Limited
- SVHK Foundation Limited
- TREATS
- Tsung Tsin Mission of Hong Kong Social Service, The
- United Christian Nethersole Community Health Service
- Upper Wong Tai Sin and Fung Wong Sun Tsuen Centre for the Elderly
- Wai Ji Christian Service
- Watchdog Limited
- Wu Oi Christian Centre
- Yang Memorial Methodist Social Service
- Youth Diabetes Action

(Agency names are listed in alphabetical order)

== Services supported (baseline allocations) ==
=== Elderly services ===
There are residential services, community support services, carer support services, and empowerment and health services. The Community Chest of Hong Kong collaborates with its member agencies such as Helping Hand and Caritas Hong Kong, to provide services for the elderly in Hong Kong.

=== Family and child welfare services ===
For child welfare services, there are day care services, developmental and supportive services, residential child care services and child protection services. For family welfare services, there are 5 components: family support services, services for families with special needs, services for family reunion and new arrivals, services for women/men as well as parent education.

=== Rehabilitation and aftercare services ===
Eight groups of people are provided with aftercare and rehabilitation services from the Community Chest of Hong Kong. They are the visually impaired, the hearing impaired, the mentally handicapped, the physically handicapped, people who are chronically ill, drug-abusers, ex-offenders and people with other disabilities.

=== Children and youth services ===
In services provided to children and youth, provision of after school care services is one of the major parts. Also, youth counselling and recreational services are provided in youth centres. While collaborating with organisations like The Hong Kong Award for Young People and The Hong Kong Federation of Youth Groups, developmental and supportive services are provided. Furthermore, training is provided for the youth with collaborations of Hong Kong Air Cadet Corps and Boys' Brigade, Hong Kong, etc. Play-related services are also provided.

=== Medical and health services ===
Medical treatment is provided and community health care is also given out in the form of programmes such as health maintenance program and cancer education. Other services like recreational therapy and ambulance services are also provided.

=== Community development and other services ===
Community services, counselling and befriending services, services for street sleepers, employment services and volunteer services are provided in different communities in Hong Kong.

== Major events ==
=== Dress Special Day ===
"Dress Special Day" (公益服飾日, formerly named "Dress Casual Day" 公益金便服日), first launched in 1993, is a day when participants can dress in their favourite wear to work or to school and at the same time to raise funds for charity. It has run become a popular fund-raising event with an increasing number of participants every year. Each participant who raises/donates HK$60 can join the event while no minimum is set for student participants.

As more and more employers began to encourage their employees to go to work in their casual wear, "Dress Casual Day" was renamed "Dress Special Day" in 2006. In doing so, the theme of this activity can be more flexible and vivid. It is hoped that donation can reach a higher peak by drawing strength from more participants.

Website for the year 2009

=== Walks for Millions ===
"Walks for Millions" (公益金百萬行) is a flagship fund-raising event of the Community Chest. It was first launched in 1971. People can participate in the walk by soliciting donation from friends and relatives. A number of walks were organised at major infrastructures before their official opening to public use. Until campaign year 2009/2010, over 3 million participants have joined this meaningful event and 160 walks have been organised by The Community Chest.

=== "Community for the Chest" Television Show ===
"Community for the Chest" Television Show (萬眾同心公益金) is another major initiative. It is jointly produced by The Community Chest and Television Broadcast Limited. Local celebrities, prominent social elites and famous stars pitch in their efforts to rally support from the general public. There are many innovative and entertaining programmes rolled out to raise funds for the Chest's member social welfare agencies.

=== The Community Chest Corporate Challenge Half Marathon ===
Runners from Corporations and organisations pitched in their support by joining the 10 km Run and 21 km Half Marathon to raise funds to designated services supported by The Community Chest.

=== Corporate and Employee Contribution Programme ===
A major fund-raising programme providing a direct channel for corporations and employees to make donations. Total contribution from corporations and employees, raised through direct donations, self-organised fundraising events or CARE Scheme – monthly payroll deduction, are recognised through a joint award scheme.

Under this programme, special events are organised to seek both corporate and public support.

==== Love Teeth Day ====
Love Teeth Day aims to arouse public awareness on oral health whilst raising funds for the needy. In return, a "Love Teeth Day Pack" with various oral care products will be presented to participants as gesture of appreciation.

==== Green Day ====
Green Day aims to arouse public awareness on environmental protection and, at the same time, raise funds for the needy. Participants are encouraged to solicit sponsorship to perform their own "GREEN" acts to support the event.

==== Skip Lunch Day ====
Launched in 1998, this event is held to encourage people to donate their lunch fees to support the needy. Each donor will be given a Skip Lunch Day Coupon by making a donation of HK$30 or more. In 2010, this event was supported by nearly 300 organisations and government departments. Over HK$1.6 million was raised.

==== Stock Code Balloting Scheme for Charity ====
Hong Kong Exchanges and Clearing Limited (HKEx) has always been a staunch partner of The Community Chest of Hong Kong. To encourage listed companies to re-invest into the local community, HKEx has initiated "Stock Code Balloting for Charity Scheme" in 1999 to give each company listing on Stock Exchange of Hong Kong the option to choose its stock code by making a donation to The Community Chest and help channel invaluable resources to the local social welfare services.

=== Celebrations for the Chest ===
In lieu of gifts to celebrate birthdays, weddings, anniversaries, opening for new businesses and other special occasions, donors can share their happiness with the needy by donating to the Chest through this year-round programme.

=== Greening for the Chest ===
"Greening for the Chest", jointly organised by The Community Chest and Education Bureau, aims to convey the message of environmental protection among the youth. Over the years, students from the 18 Districts Community Youth Clubs have been encouraged to take part in cleaning, planting and tree tendering in country parks, and at the same time, raise funds for the needy in Hong Kong.

With the assistance from Leisure and Cultural Services Department and Agriculture, Fisheries and Conservation Department, organisations could also clean or plant at designated locations for a better cause.

=== Flag Day ===
The Chest encourages the younger generation to take an active role in serving the community and the annual "Flag Day" provides a channel for the youth to realise their initiatives.

Each year, more than 12,000 students and volunteers from primary and secondary schools, kindergartens, the Chest's member agencies, as well as other voluntary organisations participate in "Street Flag Sale". Together with the significant contributions from schools participating in "Gold Flag Sale", the event has helped raise a generous amount of resources.

== Finances ==
In campaign year 2008/2009, The Community Chest has raised a total of 18,005,080 Hong Kong Dollars.

In 2009/2010, The Community Chest allocated over HK$180 million to its member agencies: 32% on Rehabilitation and Aftercare Services, 15% on Children and Youth Services, 10% on Elderly Services, 19% on Community Development and Other Services, 18% on Family and Child Welfare Services, and also used 6% of the fund raised in advocating Medical and Health Services.

== Rainbow Fund ==
To help people who are in an emergency financial crisis, the Chest has initiated an emergency relief fund in early 2004. The Community Chest "Cheung Kong" Rainbow Fund helps:

- individuals and families with imminent needs – threat to survival; or
- individuals and families with imminent needs – otherwise causing irreversible damage and social consequences;
- the marginalised in society, and those who may be caught between gaps.

== Approval of fund allocation ==
- The application forms, supporting documents and the past work of the organisations will be considered.
- The Chest will consult different professionals in society including government officials.
- The Chest will make co-ordination with the government's policy for the best results.
- Any fund allocation is approved by an independent committee.

== Supervision of fund allocation ==
- Member agencies are requested to submit work progress reports with the output and outcomes of the funds stated bi-annually.
- Auditors' reports are used as reference.
- Regular visits to member agencies are conducted.

== See also ==
- Community Chest (organization)
