= Wood Road (Hong Kong) =

Road in Wan Chai, Hong Kong

Coordinates: 22.276402°N 114.176994°E

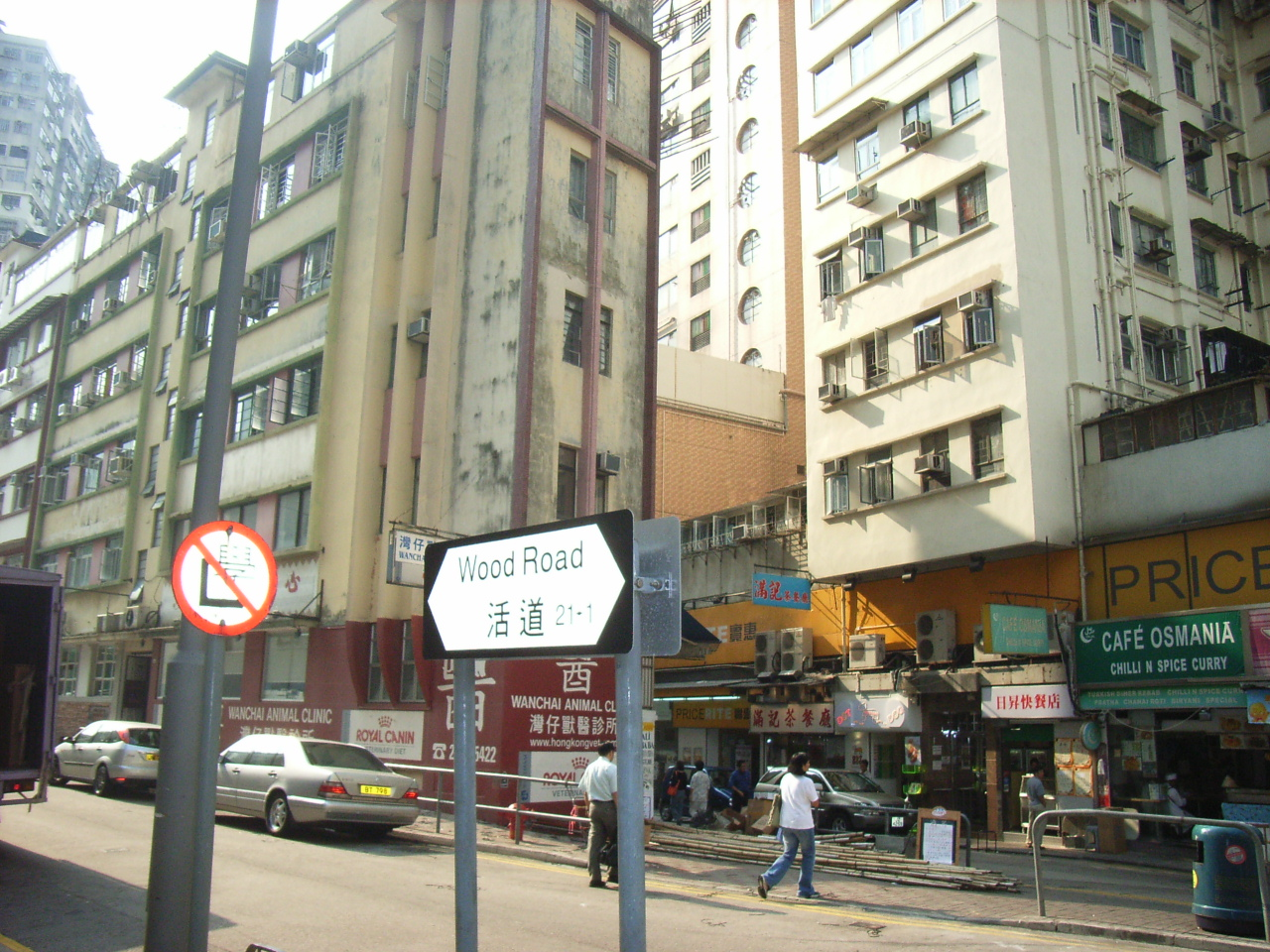
Eastern section of Wood Road

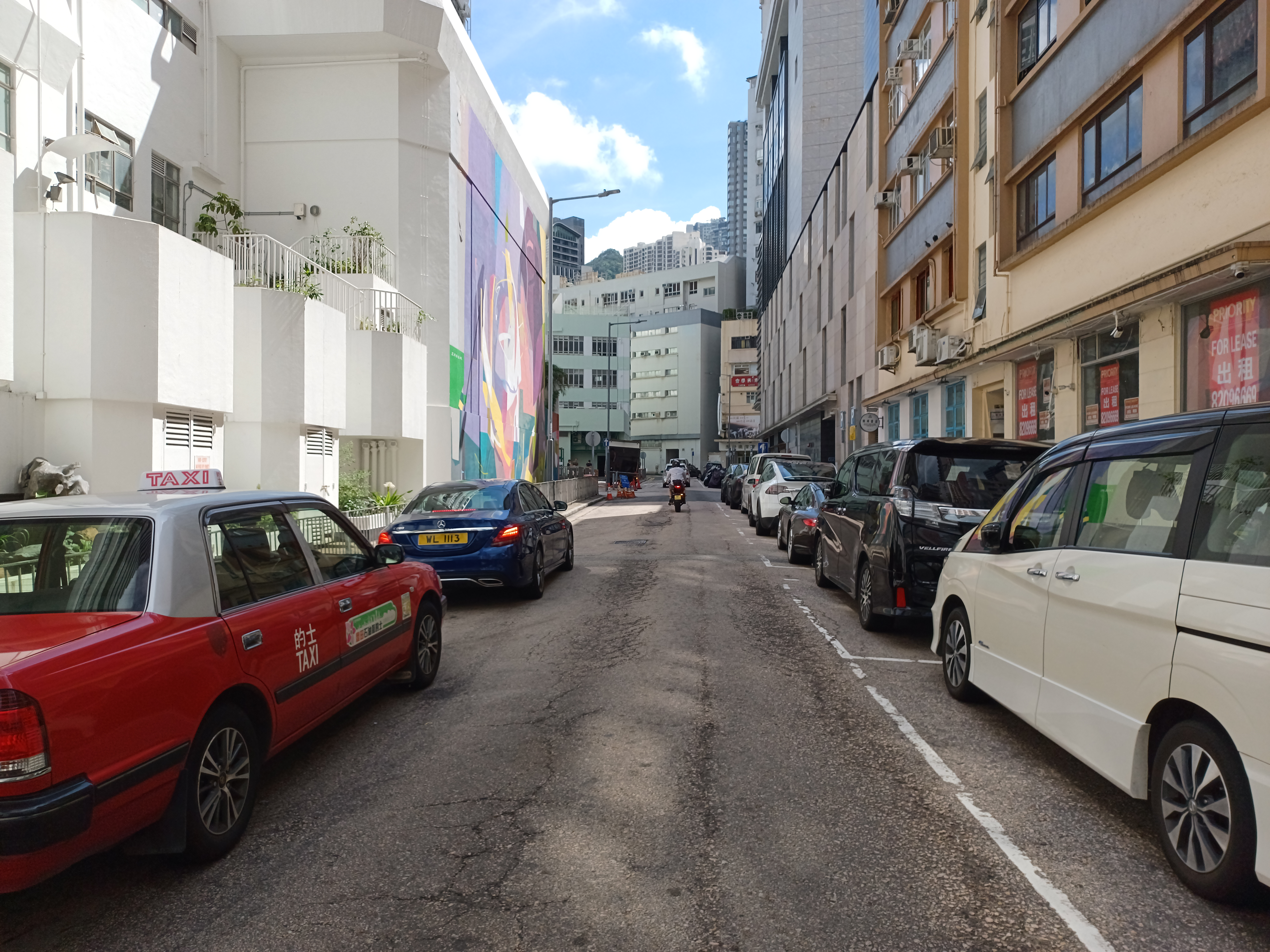
Wood Road, Wan Chai near Wing Cheung Street in 2023

Wood Road (Chinese: 活道) is an L-shaped road in the Wan Chai district of Hong Kong Island. It connects Wan Chai Road in the northeast, opposite to C C Wu Building and Oriental 188 Shopping Centre, and Queen's Road East in the southwest, between the Tung Wah Centenary Plaza Garden and St. Joseph's Primary School. There is a staircase at the end of Wood Road and vehicles cannot drive directly from Wood Road to Queen's Road East. Wood Road is not a main road for traffic, but as there are two primary schools, two secondary schools and the Morrison Hill campus of the Hong Kong Institute of Vocational Education in the area, a large number of students use the road on daily basis.

== History ==
Wood Road originally formed a part of the slope of Morrison Hill. When Wan Chai was expanded by reclaiming from the sea in 1924, earth from Morrison Hill was excavated for that reclamation. Due to the rocky nature of the hill, only half of it was excavated, the other half was razed to the ground after the war.

== Name ==
The road was named after the then acting Chief Justice of the Supreme Court of Hong Kong John Roskruge Wood. The Chinese name of the street 活道 (wuht douh) is a phonetic transliteration, matching the Chinese name of the street English namesake 活約翰, and thus avoiding the confusion with the material wood.

== Nearby schools ==
- Wah Yan College, Hong Kong
- Sheng Kung Hui Tang Shiu Kin Secondary School
- Tang Shiu Kin Victoria Government Secondary School
- St. Joseph's Primary School
- Tung Wah Group of Hospitals Li Chi Ho Primary School
- Morrison Hill campus of the Hong Kong Institute of Vocational Education
- Wan Chai School
- The Jockey Club Hong Chi School
- Lady Trench Training Centre
- Government Trade School (the predecessor of the Hong Kong Polytechnic University)

== Nearby public amenities ==
- Morrison Hill Swimming Pool
- Queen Elizabeth Stadium
- Wan Chai Park

== Nearby hospitals ==
- Ruttonjee Hospital
- Tang Shiu Kin Hospital
- Tang Shiu Kin Hospital Community Ambulatory Care Centre
- Tang Chi Ngong Maternal & Child Health Centre
