= Cheung Chau Government Secondary School =

Secondary school in Hong Kong

- 長洲官立中學
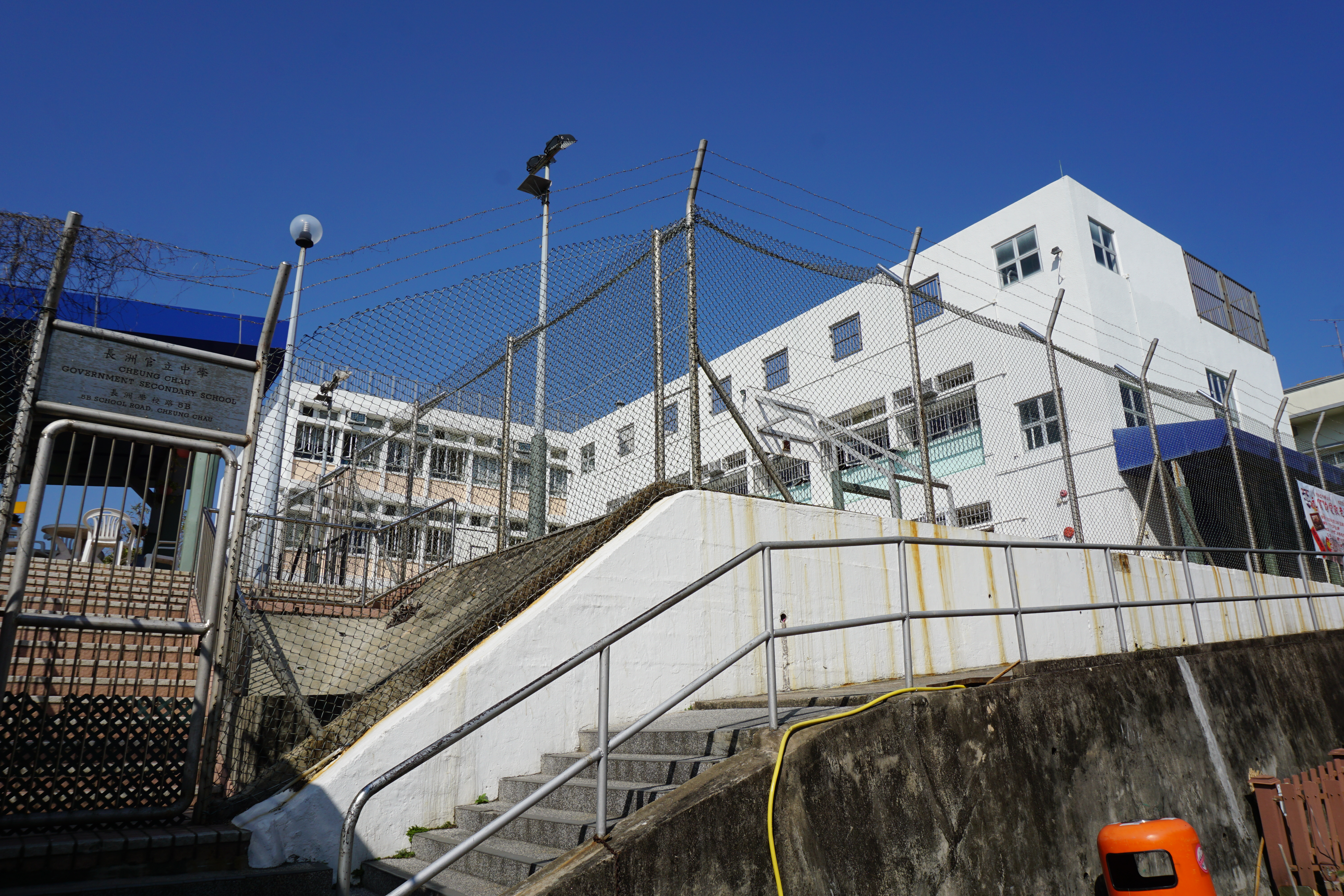

Location
- 5B School Road; Cheung Chau; Hong Kong
- Coordinates: 22°12′23.74″N 114°1′48.99″E

Information
- School type: Government-operated, Secondary school
- Motto: Through learning and temperance to virtue
- Established: c. July 1908; 117 years ago
- School district: Islands District
- Supervisor: Gloria Li Ho Suk-wa
- Principal: WONG Kwok-keung
- Staff: 32
- Grades: Secondary 1 to 6
- Gender: Co-educational
- Classes: 12
- Language: Chinese
- Area: 8,000 m^{2} (86,000 sq ft)
- Website: www.ccgss.edu.hk

Cheung Chau Government Secondary School (Chinese: 長洲官立中學) is a government-operated secondary school located on the outlying island of Cheung Chau, Hong Kong. The school was founded in 1908 by Chinese-American Ng Chung-hiu. It uses Chinese as the medium of instruction for all subjects except English language.

Due to insufficient enrollment in the area, the school will stop admitting new Secondary 1 and Secondary 4 students starting from the 2026/27 school year. It is set to merge with Tang Shiu Kin Victoria Government Secondary School in Wan Chai, with a final closure scheduled for the end of the 2028/29 school year. This marks the end of secondary education on the island, following the closure of Buddhist Wai Yan Memorial College in 2022.

== History ==
In the early days of the school's founding, the training hall at Tai San Street was used as the school building. It was not until 1928 that the red-brick school building was completed and opened at its current location. The opening ceremony was presided over by the then-Secretary for Education, Woody Woods.

The school was originally a primary school, until 1961 when it was converted into a secondary school and renamed to its current name.

Due to a declining student population and insufficient enrollment, the school is undergoing a phased closure and merger with Tang Shiu Kin Victoria Government Secondary School in Wan Chai. The plan, announced by the Education Bureau, will see the school stop admitting new Secondary 1 and Secondary 4 students starting from the 2026/27 school year. The campus is scheduled for total closure at the end of the 2028/29 school year. This marks the definitive end of secondary education provision on Cheung Chau island, following the previous closure of Buddhist Wai Yan Memorial College in 2022.

== Historical conservation ==
During the Japanese occupation of Hong Kong in World War II, the red-brick school building served as the Japanese military headquarters. It has been listed as a Grade II historic building since 18 December 2009 and is one of six existing pre-war government school buildings in Hong Kong.
