= International Organization for Mediation =

Intergovernmental organisation initiated by the People's Republic of China

International Organization for Mediation 国际调解院 國際調解院
- Official logo

- Member states of the International Organization for Mediation

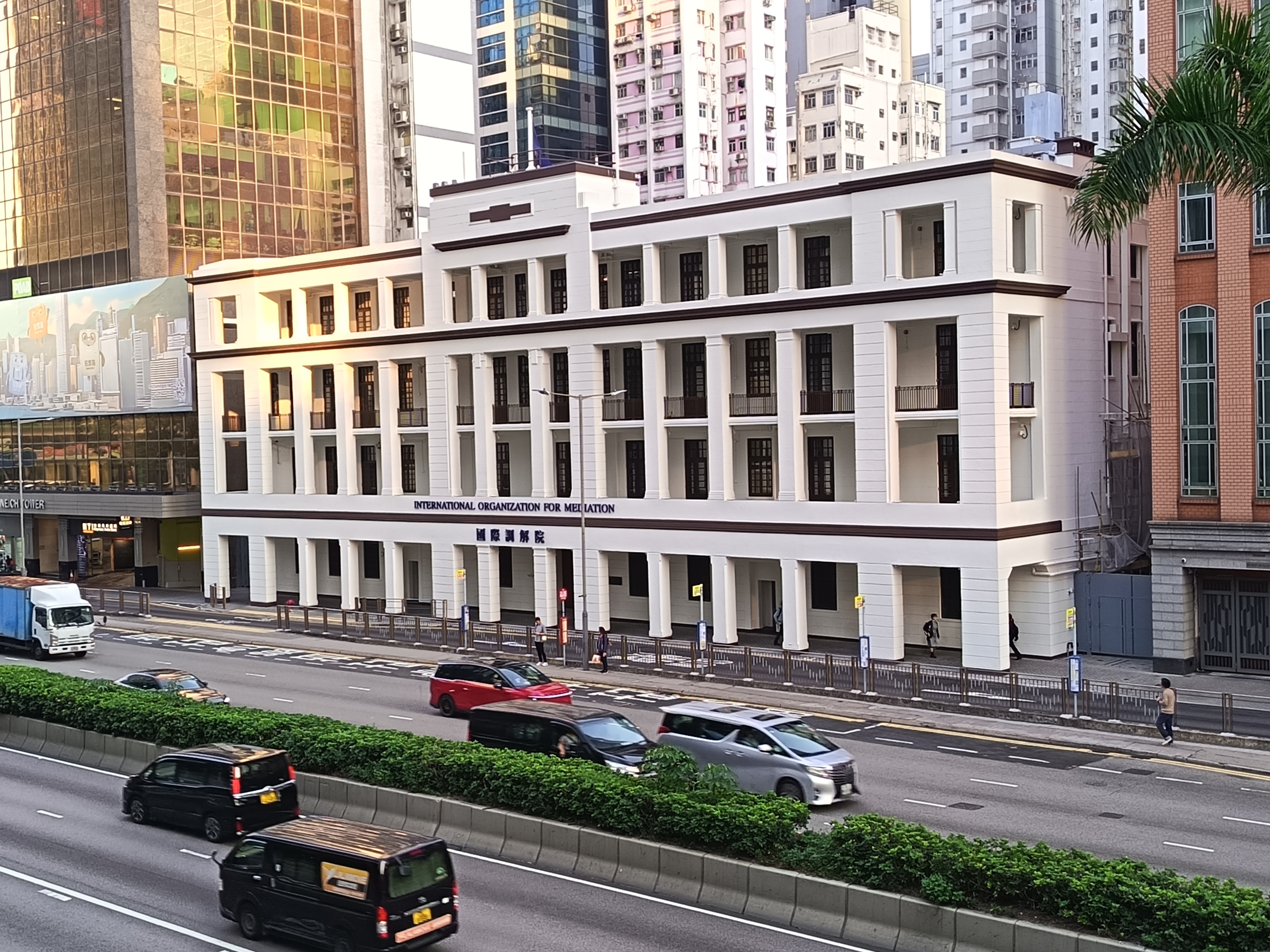
- Old Wan Chai Police Station, headquarters of IOMed
- Headquarters: Wan Chai, Hong Kong
- Official languages: English; Chinese
- Type: Intergovernmental organisation
- Membership: 36 (August 2025)

Leaders
  - Secretary-General: Teresa Cheng
  - Deputy Secretary-General: Sun Jin
- Establishment: May 30, 2025; 13 months ago
- Website www.iomed.int

International Organization for Mediation
- Simplified Chinese: 国际调解院
- Traditional Chinese: 國際調解院
Transcriptions
Standard Mandarin
- Hanyu Pinyin: Guójì Tiáojiě Yuàn
- Bopomofo: ㄍㄨㄛˊ ㄐㄧˋ ㄊㄧㄠˊ ㄐㄧㄝˇ ㄩㄢˋ
Yue: Cantonese
- Yale Romanization: Gwok Jai Tìuh Gáai Yuhn
- Jyutping: Gwok3 Zai3 Tiu4 Gaai2 Jyun2

The International Organization for Mediation (IOMed; simplified Chinese: 国际调解院; traditional Chinese: 國際調解院) is an intergovernmental mediation council for international disputes. It is headquartered in Wan Chai, Hong Kong. The founding members include China, Algeria, Belarus, Cambodia, Djibouti, Indonesia, Laos, Pakistan, Serbia, and Sudan.

== History ==
=== Background and preparation work ===
According to the government of the People's Republic of China, the establishment of IOMed came out its efforts to mediate a dispute between Ethiopia, Egypt and Sudan that started with Ethiopia's decision in 2011 to begin work on its Grand Ethiopian Renaissance Dam.

In October 2022, Ma Xinmin, ambassador of the PRC to the Republic of Sudan, and Ali Al-Sadiq Ali, the acting foreign minister of Sudan, held a signing and handover ceremony for the "Joint Statement on the Establishment of the International Organization for Mediation" at the Sudan Friendship Hall in Khartoum, the capital of Sudan.

In December 2022, the Hong Kong Chief Executive in Council enacted the International Organizations (Privileges and Immunities) (Amendment) Bill 2022 in accordance with the International Organizations (Privileges and Immunities) Ordinance (Chapter 558) of the Laws of Hong Kong, with the purpose of providing privileges and immunities to the Preparatory Office of IOMed and its associated persons, and to allow Hong Kong to host the organisation itself. Hong Kong was chosen as the official headquarters due to its bilingual common law framework—Hong Kong is the only jurisdiction in China that follows common law—and due to the one country, two systems principle, under which Hong Kong has to also work with the civil law of mainland China.

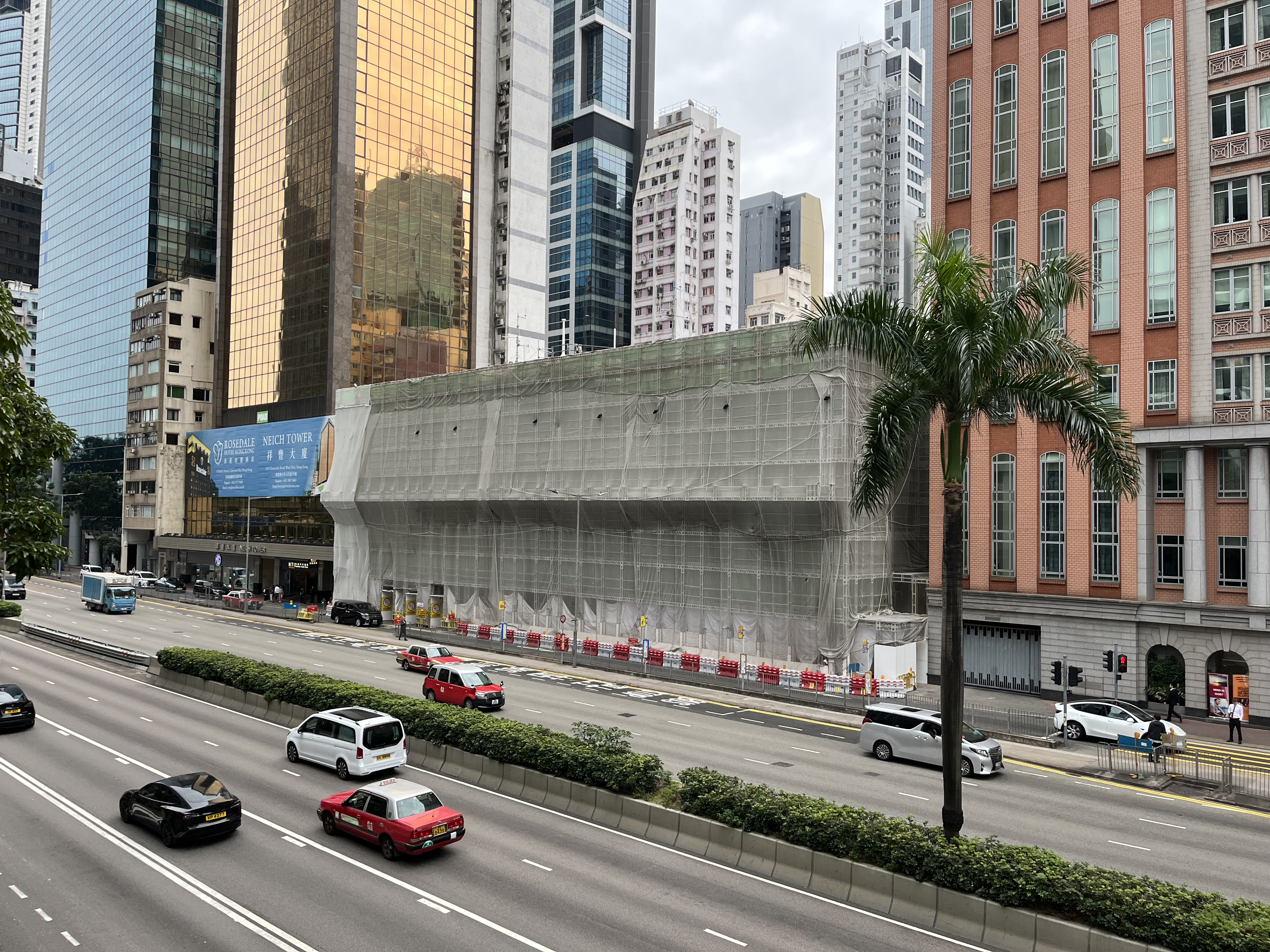
The Old Wan Chai Police Station under refurbishment

On 16 February 2023, IOMed's Preparatory Office was established with Sun Jin appointed as its director-general and on 17 February 2023, representatives of the signatories of the Joint Statement on the Establishment of the International Organization for Mediation attended the inauguration ceremony, which Qin Gang, then Chinese state councillor and foreign minister, delivered a video speech.

In early 2024, it was decided that the headquarters of IOMed is to be located at the Old Wan Chai Police Station.

=== Establishment and subsequent memberships ===
On 30 May 2025, the signing ceremony for the establishment of the organisation was held in Hong Kong at Grand Hyatt Hong Kong.

On 19 August 2025, the chargé d'affaire of Togo Tchaa Batchassi Gnama signed the IOMed convention in Beijing.

On 28 August 2025, the ambassador of Myanmar Tin Maung Swe signed the IOMed convention in Beijing.

On 29 August 2025, the chargé d'affaire of Central African Republic Wilfrid Emery Perks-Buwamba signed the IOMed convention in Beijing. On the same day, IOMed announced that the convention has entered into force for China, Nicaragua and Venezuela.

On 18 September 2025, the ambassador of Angola Dalva Maurĺcia Calombo Ringote Allen signed the IOMed convention in Beijing.

The central office was inaugurated in October 2025. Thirty-three countries had at that time signed the IOMed convention, with many of them being part of the Belt and Road Initiative. The opening ceremony's speaker, Wang Yi, the minister of foreign affairs, indicated that IOMed wishes for more countries to join as the it grows. Former Secretary for Justice Teresa Cheng SC was appointed as the new secretary-general at the ceremony, with the previous secretary-general Sun Jin being re-appointed as deputy secretary general.

== Structure and governance ==
IOMed consists of a governing council, a secretariat and a two panels of mediators. The council serves as the mediation body's primary decision-making body (responsible for policy formulation and strategic direction), is composed of one representative per member state (with alternates permitted in case of absence) and elects a chairperson and optional vice-chairpersons annually. The Secretariat handles daily operations and consists of a secretary-general (chief legal representative), one or more deputy secretaries-generals and additional staff as required. The panels of mediators consist of members who are appointed for five-year terms (which may be renewed) and serve on either the "State-to-State Mediation Panel" (handling intergovernmental disputes) or "The General Mediation Panel" (addressing other disputes covered).

== Membership ==
Members of the International Organization for Mediation include the following countries:

Countries	Signed	Ratified	Effective
Algeria	30 May 2025		
Angola	18 September 2025		
Belarus	30 May 2025		
Benin	30 May 2025		
Cambodia	30 May 2025		
Cameroon	30 May 2025		
Central African Republic	29 August 2025		
China	30 May 2025	27 June 2025	29 August 2025
Republic of the Congo	30 May 2025		November 2025
Cuba	30 May 2025		
Djibouti	30 May 2025		
Dominica	30 May 2025		November 2025
Equatorial Guinea	30 May 2025		
Ethiopia	30 May 2025		
Gabon	30 May 2025		
Ghana	27 January 2026		
Guinea-Bissau	29 August 2025		
Indonesia	29 August 2025		
Iran	22 June,2026		
Jamaica	29 August 2025		
Kenya	29 August 2025		November 2025
Kiribati	29 August 2025		November 2025
Laos	29 August 2025		
Mauritania	29 August 2025		
Morocco	31 October 2025		
Myanmar	28 August 2025		
Nauru	30 May 2025		
Nicaragua	30 May 2025	26 June 2025	29 August 2025
Nigeria	30 May 2025		
Pakistan	30 May 2025		November 2025
Papua New Guinea	30 May 2025		
Serbia	30 May 2025		
Solomon Islands	30 May 2025		
Sudan	30 May 2025		
Timor-Leste	30 May 2025		
Togo	19 August 2025		
Uganda	30 May 2025		
Vanuatu	30 May 2025		
Venezuela	30 May 2025	12 June 2025	29 August 2025
Zimbabwe	30 May 2025		

== Objectives and appraisal ==
According to John Lee, the chief executive of Hong Kong, IOMed would help cement the city's reputation as a top destination for resolving international disputes and would have a status that would be on par with the International Court of Justice and the Permanent Court of Arbitration. According to Paul Lam, the secretary for justice of Hong Kong, the body's establishment came as "hostile external forces are attempting to de-internationalise and de-functionalise" the city. Nikkei Asia reported that IOMed was "backed by mostly friendly states [of China]", and that while its history dated back to 2022, its formal establishment only came "with the second Trump administration pushing a raft of unilateral trade and foreign policies."

== See also ==
- International Court of Justice
- International Criminal Court
- United Nations
