= Old Wan Chai Police Station =

Grade II historic building in Hong Kong

Coordinates: 22.279248°N 114.175286°E

- 舊灣仔警署
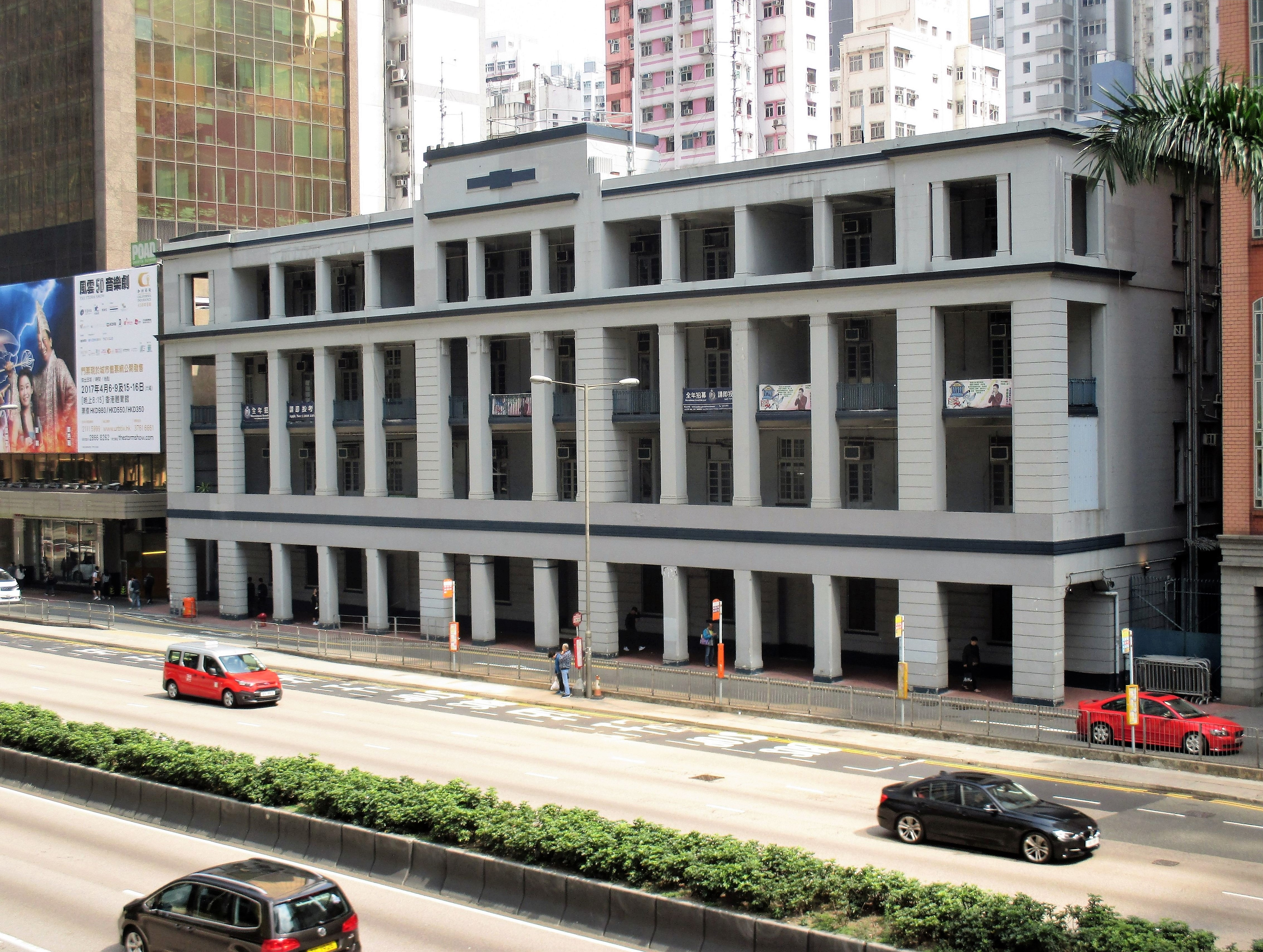
- Wan Chai Police Station in 2017, facing Gloucester Road.
- Interactive map of the Old Wan Chai Police Station area

General information
- Classification: Grade III Historic Building
- Location: Wan Chai, Hong Kong, 123 Gloucester Road
- Completed: 1932; 94 years ago
- Relocated: 2010; 16 years ago

Old Wan Chai Police Station
- Traditional Chinese: 舊灣仔警署
- Simplified Chinese: 旧湾仔警署
Transcriptions
Standard Mandarin
- Hanyu Pinyin: Jiù Wān Zǎi Jǐngshǔ
Yue: Cantonese
- Yale Romanization: Gauh wāan jái gíng chyúh
- Jyutping: Gau6 waan1 zai2 ging2 cyu5

No. 2 Police Station
- Traditional Chinese: 二號差館
- Simplified Chinese: 二号差馆
Transcriptions
Standard Mandarin
- Hanyu Pinyin: Èrhào Chāiguǎn
Yue: Cantonese
- Yale Romanization: Yíh houh chāai gún
- Jyutping: Ji6 hou6 caai1 gun2

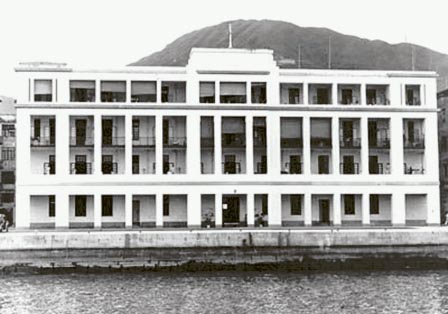
Wan Chai Police Station in 1932, facing onto Victoria Harbour.

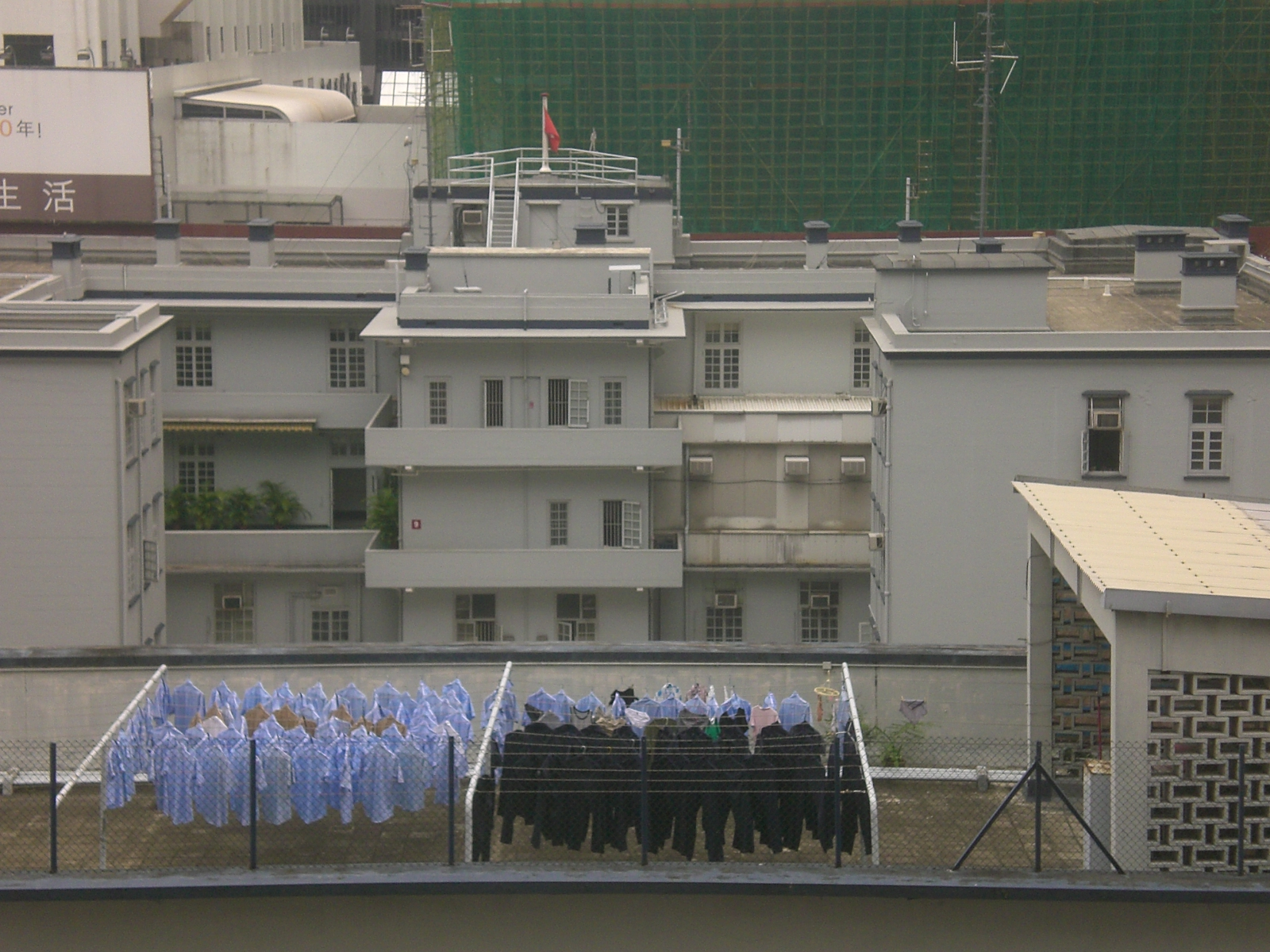
View of the back of Wan Chai Police Station in May 2009, from Lockhart Road Public Library.

Old Wan Chai Police Station, also known as No. 2 Police Station or Eastern Police Station, is a building located at No. 123 Gloucester Road, Wan Chai, Hong Kong.

== History ==
It was built in 1932 on land reclaimed under the Praya East Reclamation Scheme (1921–1929) and faced directly onto Victoria Harbour from the 1930s to the 1960s.

The police station was relocated to Arsenal House Lower Block at 1 Arsenal Street, Wan Chai, in 2010.

In 2024, the building was chosen to be used as the headquarters for the International Organisation for Mediation.

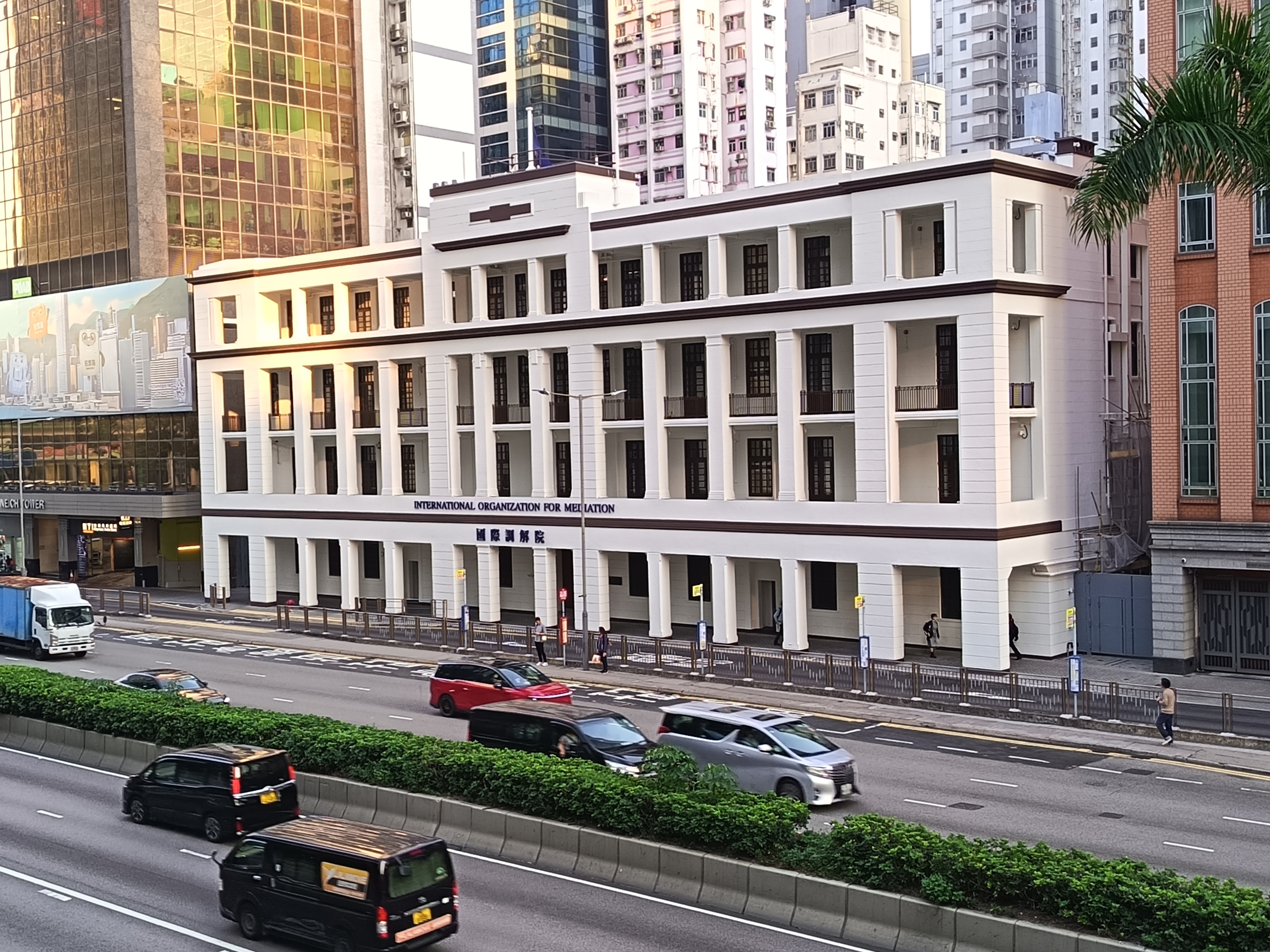
the current usage of the building is IOMed Headquarters

== Conservation ==
Previously a Grade III Historic Building, the building became a Grade II Historic Building in December 2009. In 2011, the Development Bureau announced that the former Wan Chai Police Station cum Wan Chai Police Married Quarters site will be partly preserved and partly redeveloped for business and commercial uses.

== See also ==
- Historic police buildings in Hong Kong
