= Praya East Reclamation Scheme =

Coordinates: 22.2794°N 114.1811°E

- Traditional Chinese: 海旁東填海計劃
- Simplified Chinese: 海旁东填海计划
Transcriptions
Standard Mandarin
- Hanyu Pinyin: Hǎipángdōng Tiánhǎi Jìhuà
Yue: Cantonese
- Jyutping: hoi2 pong4 dung1 tin4 hoi2 gai3 waak6

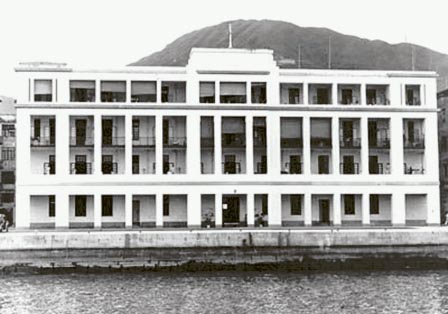
Wan Chai Police Station in 1932. It was built on land reclaimed under the Praya East Reclamation Scheme and faced directly onto Victoria Harbour from the 1930s to the 1960s.

Praya East Reclamation Scheme (Chinese: 海旁東填海計劃) was a large scale land reclamation project in colonial Hong Kong lasting from 1921 to 1931 under Sir Catchick Paul Chater.

== Proposal ==
The plan was first proposed while the existing Praya Reclamation Scheme was already active in 1897. Construction did not start until 20 years later when the Royal Navy agreed to relocate the Naval hospital to Stonecutters Island.

== Reclamation scheme ==
Construction work started at the junction of present-day Hennessy Road and Johnston Road to Percival Street. The main goal was to relieve the population density in Victoria City. The project ended up expanding Central to Wan Chai.

One of the reasons for the reclamation scheme was to provide an enhanced water supply. A cross-harbour pipeline brought water all the way from the New Territories in 1930, the same year that the reclamation scheme was completed.

== See also ==
- Central and Wan Chai Reclamation
- Land reclamation in Hong Kong
- Morrison Hill
- Wan Chai Police Station
