= Teresa Cheng (politician) =

Hong Kong barrister and politician

The Honourable Teresa Cheng GBM GBS SC JP
- 鄭若驊
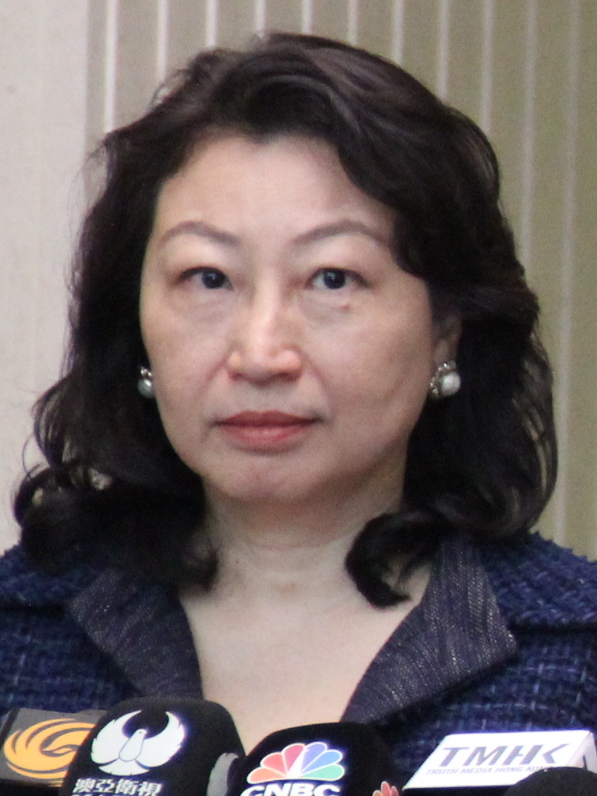
- Cheng in 2019

Secretary General of the International Organization for Mediation
- Incumbent
- Assumed office 20 October 2025
- Preceded by: Position established

4th Secretary for Justice of Hong Kong
- In office 6 January 2018 – 30 June 2022
- Chief Executive: Carrie Lam
- Preceded by: Rimsky Yuen
- Succeeded by: Paul Lam

Personal details
- Born: 11 November 1958 (age 68) Hong Kong
- Spouse(s): Herman Li Hong-wah (m. 1987; div. 2010) Otto Poon Lok-to (m. 2016)
- Education: King's College London (BSc); University of London (LLB)
- Profession: Arbitrator, barrister, engineer, politician

Teresa Cheng Yeuk-wah
- Traditional Chinese: 鄭若驊
- Simplified Chinese: 郑若骅
Transcriptions
Standard Mandarin
- Hanyu Pinyin: Zhèng Ruòhuá
Yue: Cantonese
- Jyutping: zeng6 joek6 waa4

Teresa Cheng Yeuk-wah GBM GBS SC JP (Chinese: 鄭若驊; born 11 November 1958) is a Hong Kong Senior Counsel, arbitrator and politician. She served as Secretary for Justice of Hong Kong from 2018 to 2022. She was also the chairperson of the Financial Dispute Resolution Centre, the Hong Kong International Arbitration Centre (HKIAC) and vice-president of the International Council of Commercial Arbitration (ICCA). She is currently the secretary-general of the International Organization for Mediation.

== Academic and legal career ==
Cheng graduated from the King's College London with the Bachelor of Science in engineering and the University of London with the Bachelor of Laws. She was called to the Bar in England and Wales and Hong Kong in 1987 and in New South Wales, Australia in 1990, before Singapore in 1995. She was called to the Hong Kong Inner Bar in 2000. Prior to her appointment as secretary for justice, Cheng practised at Des Voeux Chambers, specialising in construction, international commercial transactions, joint venture contracts and investment arbitration, international arbitration and mediation. She has also sat as a deputy judge in the Court of First Instance of the High Court of Hong Kong.

Cheng also holds several academic positions. She is a Fellow of King's College London, previously an honorary and visiting professor of the China University of Political Science and Law and the course director of the International Arbitration and Dispute Settlement Course at the School of Law, Tsinghua University and adjunct professor with the Hong Kong Polytechnic University. Cheng co-authored numerous books and articles, including Construction Law and Practice in Hong Kong and Arbitration in Hong Kong: A Practical Guide, published by Sweet & Maxwell, and papers in the International Council for Commercial Arbitration Congress Series, published by Kluwer Law International.

== Public career ==
She has been appointed in various positions, previously serving as the chairperson for the Provisional Minimum Wage Commission, Transport Advisory Committee, Town Planning Appeal Board, Environmental Impact Assessment Appeal Board Panel, the Appeal Tribunal (Buildings) Panel and the Copyright Tribunal among others. She is the current chairperson of the Financial Dispute Resolution Centre and Air Transport Licensing Authority and a member of the Construction Industry Council and two Working Groups on Mediation in Hong Kong.

She is also the chairperson of the Hong Kong International Arbitration Centre (HKIAC) and vice-president of the International Council of Commercial Arbitration (ICCA). She was the first Asian woman to be elected as president of the Chartered Institute of Arbitrators (CIArb). In 2006 and 2011, she was awarded the Bronze Bauhinia Star and Gold Bauhinia Star by the Chief executive Donald Tsang in recognition of her public service.

== Secretary for justice ==
On 5 January 2018, Chief Executive Carrie Lam announced her appointment as the secretary for justice with effect from the following day, succeeding the retiring Rimsky Yuen.

=== Illegal structures controversy ===
Ming Pao and Apple Daily revealed on 5 January 2018, just before Cheng was due to take office, that there was an extra staircase seemingly leading to illegal structures in her residence at No. 4 Villa de Mer, 5 Lok Chui Street, Siu Lam, Tuen Mun. She apologised for the "inconvenience caused" by the illegal structures, admitting it was illegal but arguing that the basements and rooftop structures in question on both properties existed before she bought the residence. Lawrence Lok Ying-kam SC asked Cheng to consider her resignation. Further reports, confirmed by Buildings Department inspectors, revealed that there were ten unauthorised extensions, including the basements and the rooftop structures, on Cheng's residence and an adjacent property belonging to her husband, Otto Poon Lok-to. It emerged in the media reports in the following days that a mortgage deed Cheng signed with the bank for the house did not mention the basement.

In December 2018, the Buildings Department announced three units with problematic structures of the Cheng's properties "had been corrected" and Cheng would not be prosecuted over illegal structures but they would only charge Cheng's engineer husband Otto Poon over suspected unauthorised structures at their homes in Tuen Mun.

=== UGL case controversy ===
On 12 December 2018, the Department of Justice also issued a statement claiming there was "insufficient evidence to support a reasonable prospect of conviction" against former chief executive Leung Chun-ying for any criminal offence over Leung's receipt of HK$50 million from Australian engineering firm UGL. Many critics, including former director of public prosecutions Grenville Cross, said he found it "very surprising" that no independent legal advice was sought on Leung's case and urged the secretary for justice to explain. "For many years, this has been the invariable practice whenever a senior government official has been suspected of a criminal offence," Cross said. The Democratic Party also considered asking for a judicial review of the Department of Justice's decision.

Hundreds of protesters demonstrated against the government's decision on 23 December. Cheng, who was under fire and demanded a more detailed explanation kept silence for two weeks until Cheng returned from her leave on 26 December. She dismissed suggestions that she had been on official leave since 15 December to avoid facing the public "spurious". She also argued the issues were being "politicised". She rejected the need to give further explanations on the Leung case, including of whether she was personally involved in the decision not to prosecute Leung, and also rejected the Bar Association's call to delegate prosecution decisions to the top prosecutor.

Her popular ratings fell to a new low among senior officials, according to two new polls conducted by the University of Hong Kong and Chinese University of Hong Kong. The opposition pro-democrats mounted a no-confidence motion, tabled by Dennis Kwok, against Cheng. Cheng survived with the no-confidence motion with the support of the pro-Beijing legislators.

=== 2019–20 Hong Kong protests ===
Cheng was considered a key figure in the drafting of the extradition bill that led to the 2019–20 Hong Kong protests. In October 2019, Cheng's public approval ratings dropped to 14.7 points out of 100, the lowest among the top officials in Hong Kong according to a poll conducted by the Hong Kong Public Opinion Research Institute, categorising her performance as "disastrous".

Following the death of Chow Tsz-lok, Cheng was heckled and jostled by supporters of the protests in London, who called her "murderer", when she was entering Bloomsbury Square to give a lecture. She fell on the ground and injured her arm.

In January 2021, Cheng stated her support for the National Security Law, claiming that One country, two systems had not been undermined by the law. Earlier in November 2020, Cheng claimed that the national security law had encouraged positive investment and commerce in Hong Kong.

In February 2021, at the 46th session of the United Nations Human Rights Council, Cheng appeared in a video message and said that because of the National Security Law, "people are free to express different views openly," and that "The National Security Law expressly provides that human rights such as freedom of speech and assembly, be protected."

=== U.S. sanctions ===
On 3 July 2020, the Chinese official media, Xinhua News Agency, stated that the Committee for Safeguarding National Security of the Hong Kong Special Administrative Region was formally established. There were 10 members of the committee. As the Secretary for Justice of Hong Kong, Cheng was a member of the committee.

In August 2020, Cheng and ten other officials were sanctioned by the United States Department of the Treasury under Executive Order 13936 by President Trump for undermining Hong Kong's autonomy.

Analogue Holdings Limited (ATAL; 1977) a company controlled by Poon Lok-To, spouse of Cheng, announced on 11 August that it has sold back 2% of shares of Transel Elevator & Electric Inc. (TEI) at cost to Mark Gregorio, chairman of TEI, for US$1.4 million (approximately HK$10.92 million) to reduce ATAL's interest from 51% to 49% after the sanction against Teresa Cheng. Analogue Holdings was awarded government contracts worth HK$1.2 billion in financial year 2018–2019.

On 14 October 2020, the United States Department of State released a report on ten individuals who materially contributed to the failure of the China to meet its obligations under the Sino–British Joint Declaration and Hong Kong's Basic Law. Cheng was included on the list.

=== Separation of powers ===
In September 2020, Cheng wrote a commentary on SCMP, saying that separation of powers between branches of government "has no place" in Hong Kong.

=== Attacks on the judiciary ===
In December 2020, five members of the Law Society asked that Cheng defend the judicial system from attacks by mainland state media, after People's Daily claimed that granting Jimmy Lai bail had hurt Hong Kong's rule of law, and claimed that he should be tried in the mainland. The Hong Kong Bar Association also made a similar request, saying that Cheng must "take appropriate action and come forward to staunchly defend the independence of the judiciary." In January 2021, the Bar Association's chairman, Philip Dykes, reiterated that Cheng should take action against baseless criticisms against judges.

=== Criticism of the media ===
In February 2021, Cheng claimed that some news media were using "biased expressions that fail to reflect the facts in an objective manner" when it came to describing appeals or sentencing reviews made by the Department of Justice. Cheng did not specify which media or reports were doing so, and in response, the Journalists Association's chairman, Chris Yeung said "We worry that this is part of the campaign to smear the media" and said that this could lead to potential restrictions on media.

=== No jury ===
In the first trial under the national security law, against Tong Ying-kit, Cheng in early February 2021 told the defendants that the case would not be determined by a jury, but rather three judges. In her explanation, Cheng claimed that "the personal safety of jurors and their family members" would be at risk, and therefore jurors would not be allowed on the case. RTHK noted that trial by jury has been used in Hong Kong for 176 years and has been described by the Department of Justice as one if "its most important features." Eric Cheung, professor of law at the University of Hong Kong, criticised the decision and said "It's irrational. They have been saying Hong Kong has restored peace since the introduction of the national security law. So why can’t the government ensure the safety of jurors and their family members?"

In April 2021, Tong filed a judicial review with the High Court, asking them to revoke the no-jury decision for several reasons, including that Tong was not allowed to be heard prior to the no-jury ruling. However, the High Court rejected the application.

=== Schoolchildren ===
In February 2020, the Department of Justice was allocated HKD $450,000,000 for the "Vision 2030 for Rule of Law" initiative. As part of the initiative, Cheng in November 2020 said that a pilot program would be started to teach primary and secondary schoolchildren about "rule of law values" and prevent children from having "incorrect concepts" about topics such as the 2019–20 Hong Kong protests. Material for schoolchildren would include watching a cartoon to install obedience to the law.

=== Blank votes ===
In April 2021, Cheng, along with Erick Tsang Kwok-wai, announced that the government would be looking into the possibility of banning blank ballots; in response, HKU Professor Johannes Chan Man-mun said that "You can't force people to vote for a particular person, or prevent people from voting for that person, or bar them from performing certain voting acts."

=== Stand News ===
In December 2021, after the dissolution of Stand News, Cheng said that foreign politicians and organisations who had criticised the dissolution were "in blatant violation of international law", without specifying which law was broken.

== Personal life ==
=== Marriage ===
Cheng is married to engineer Otto Poon Lok-to, former president of the Hong Kong Institution of Engineers. Poon holds a Canadian passport. Their relationship was unknown to the public until she admitted to the public after the media widely reported the "illegal structures" of her residence next to Poon's. In 2014, Poon's ex-wife was awarded a divorce payout of HK$766 million, about half of his HK$1.5 billion family trust. Poon is also a member of the Election Committee and voted for Carrie Lam in 2017. In December 2021, it was reported that Poon was eligible to vote four times in the 2021 Hong Kong legislative election, yielding 0.0318701% of the total voting value (elected seats), which is 6412 times more than the value of an average voter's total voting value.

In June 2022, the government's Competition Commission started legal proceedings against ATAL Building Services Engineering, a company which Poon started, accusing it of price-fixing and other anti-competitive practices, which could have affected projects worth HK$2 billion. In November 2022, it was announced that Poon's company faces a HK$150 million fine and admitted it fixed prices.

=== Declaration of interests ===
According to her declaration of interests, Cheng is a member of several private clubs including the Hong Kong Jockey Club, Hong Kong Club, Royal Hong Kong Yacht Club, and Clearwater Bay Golf & Country Club.

Properties she owns by herself or through her companies (Sparkle Star Development, Westland Investment and Super Alliance Co. Ltd) include:

- No. 4 Villa de Mer, Tuen Mun– the property that was discovered to have illegal structures. Bought in 2008 for HK$26 million. Purchased by her company, Sparkle Star Development.
- 1 residential property at Royal Ascot, Block 7 in Sha Tin. Owned by Westland Investment.
- 1 industrial property in Sha Tin. Owned by Westland Investment.
- 1 unit at Sea Cliff Mansions, 19C Repulse Bay Road- bought in 2017 for HK$62M, with 4.25% stamp duty designed for "first-time buyers" even though she already owned other property at the time of purchase, saving her HK$6.7 million in stamp duty. The property is on the third floor of block A, and also had illegal structures.
- 1 residential property in Beijing
- 1 residential property in Yunnan

Properties her husband owns include:

- A property adjacent to Cheng's property at 4 Villa de Mer. An illegal pool was found and Poon was fined HK $20,000. Bought in 2012 for HK$27 million.
- 1 unit at The Albany – bought in 2018 for HK$89.9 million under his own name
- 1 unit at 1 Robinson Road- bought in 2018. The unit was originally purchased in 2011 for HK$53.5 million by Polycool Limited, a company which was completely owned by another company- Palette Capital, a British Virgin Islands registered offshore firm. Poon bought Polycool from Palette Capital for HK$78.8 million, giving him full ownership of the property without changing the owner (Polycool), escaping more than HK$10 million in stamp duty.
- Toppy Tower in Kwai Chung – bought through Analogue Holdings for HK$585 million

== See also ==
- Henry Tang illegal basement controversy

Political offices
Preceded by Rimsky Yuen	Secretary for Justice; 2018–2022	Succeeded by Paul Lam
Order of precedence
Preceded by Paul Chan; Financial Secretary	Hong Kong order of precedence Secretary for Justice	Succeeded by Andrew Leung; President of the Legislative Council
