= Tang Shiu Kin Victoria Government Secondary School =

Public school in Hong Kong

Tang Shiu Kin Victoria Government Secondary School (鄧肇堅維多利亞官立中學)
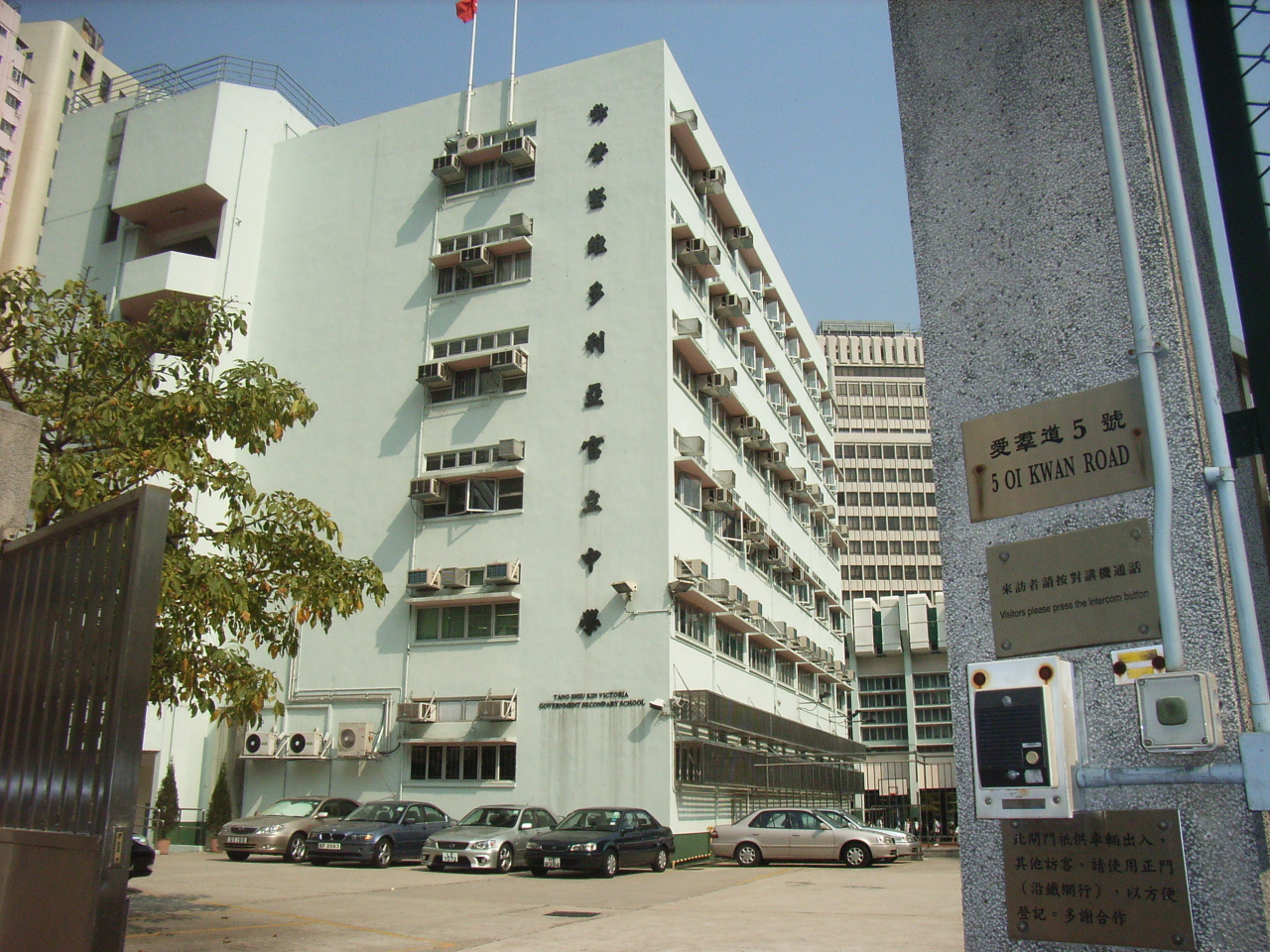

Location
- 5 Oi Kwan Road, Wan Chai, Hong Kong.

Information
- Type: Public, co-educational
- Motto: "Thorough" 「貫徹始終」
- Established: 1933
- Head teacher: Yan-kei Chan
- Language: Cantonese, English
- Affiliation: Hong Kong Government
- Information: (852) 25736962
- Website: tskvgss.edu.hk

Tang Shiu Kin Victoria Government Secondary School
- Traditional Chinese: 鄧肇堅維多利亞官立中學
- Simplified Chinese: 邓肇坚维多利亚官立中学
Transcriptions
Standard Mandarin
- Hanyu Pinyin: Dèng Zhàojiān Wéiduōlìyà Guānlì Zhōngxué
Yue: Cantonese
- Jyutping: dang6 siu6 gin1 wai4 do1 lei6 aa3 gun1 laap6 zung1 hok6

Junior Technical School
- Traditional Chinese: 初級工業學校
Transcriptions
Yue: Cantonese
- Jyutping: co1 kap1 gung1 jip6 hok6 haau6

Victoria Technical School
- Traditional Chinese: 維多利亞工業學校
Transcriptions
Yue: Cantonese
- Jyutping: wai4 do1 lei6 aa3 gung1 jip6 hok6 haau6

Tang Shiu Kin Victoria Government Secondary School (Chinese: 鄧肇堅維多利亞官立中學) was founded by the Hong Kong Government in 1933. Named the Junior Technical School (初級工業學校) initially, and then the Victoria Technical School (維多利亞工業學校) since the 1950s, it is the first government-founded technical college in Hong Kong. The school is now located at 5 Oi Kwan Road, Wan Chai, Hong Kong. Currently, the principal is Yan-kei CHAN.

In a government-led consolidation plan, the school will expand its operations to incorporate students from Cheung Chau Government Secondary School, which is undergoing a phased closure due to insufficient enrollment. The merger will see junior students (S1-S3) from Cheung Chau transfer to the Wan Chai campus to begin their S4 studies, with the full consolidation of all remaining students expected by the end of the 2028/29 school year.

== History ==
In 1931, the Hong Kong Government has set up the committee to discuss the possibility of the introduction of the technical training and education. Led by Sir William Hornell, who was the Vice-Chancellor of Hong Kong University on that time, the government has finally decided to set up the Junior Technical School (Chinese: 香港官立初級工業學校) in 1933 to provide full-time technical education for the development of Hong Kong.

In 1933, the school started with an embryonic class of 40 students and four teachers. Located in the former Victoria British School on Caroline Hill, it was operated under the name of Junior Technical School. With George White as its headmaster, the school provided a 4-year course for the pre-apprenticeship training of prospective artisans.

Later on, In 1937, its sister school, The Government Trade School (Chinese: 香港官立高級工業學院) (Later on Hong Kong Technical College) was set up in Wood Road, Wan Chai. Its headmaster was also George White.

After the Second World War, the school temporarily operated in the Morrison Hill Primary School until 1957.

In 1947, the School operated under the Hong Kong Technical College, commonly known as the "Red-brick House", on Wood Road, Wan Chai.

In 1948, the School resumed its operation after the war with 83 pupils. Entry requirement was at age of 12 and at Primary 6 level. It offered a 4-year secondary technical school education towards engineering. The learning of Model Construction, Technical Drawing and Applied Science, which prepared students for apprenticeship in engineering firms.

In 1957, the school changed its name to Victoria Technical School and relocated to the original premises of the Hong Kong Technical College in Wood Road, after the resettlement of Hong Kong Technical College to Hung Hum. At the same time, the school was shifted to offer the five-year general education course, which is designed for the Hong Kong School Certificate Examination, followed by the success of its sister school, Ho Tung Technical School For Girls (Now Hotung Secondary School).

In 1962, its sister school, Kowloon Technical School was set up. K.C Lau, the former principal of the Victoria Technical School, has become the founding headmaster of the Kowloon Technical School in the same year.

In 1979, the school was re-provisioned and moved to the existing premises. It was renamed Tang Shiu Kin Victoria Technical School in honour of the donor Sir Shiu-kin Tang. Girls were admitted into the School for the first time, and the School became co-educational. A total number of 36 classes were operated.

In 1997, the school was renamed to Tang Shiu Kin Victoria Government Secondary School.

== Principals ==
George White (1933–1941)

In 1933, Colonial Secretaries Sir Wilfrid Thomas Southornto established the school, naming “the Junior Technical College”. The campus was located at the former Victoria British School on Caroline Hill, offering a 4-year course for the pre-apprenticeship training of prospective artisans. 40 pupils and 4 teachers at start.

Kwok-ching LAU (1950–1951), (1957–1962)

In September 1950, Mr. Kwok-ching LAU was appointed as the Headmaster of this school and it was operated in the Morrison Hill Primary School until 1957. The school was transferred back to the former site of the Technical College in September 1957. In 1957, Lau took the post of headmaster again, while the school and the Technical College were divided into two institutions, to be named as "the Victoria Technical School". Students attended to the Hong Kong School Certificate Examination and seven classes were operated this year.

L.C.H. Griffiths (1951–1957)

In November 1951, Principal Lau was transferred to Kowloon Technical School and Griffiths became the Headmaster of this school.

Kwok-wing Tam (1962–1970)

In 1962, Tam took the post of Headmaster, the school was expanded to 18 classes. In 1966, the first group of students took part in the Hong Kong Advanced Level Examination.

A.G. Martin (1970–1977)

In 1970, Martin took the post of Headmaster. In 1975, this school expanded by 19 classes to 22 classes owing to the increasing number of students, 8 classrooms were borrowed from the Hong Kong Jockey Club Government Primary School for insufficient places.

Paul Lui (1977–1987)

In 1977, Lui became the headmaster. The school has opened 29 classes at that time. On 7 September 1979, Sir Crawford Murray MacLehose, the former Governor of Hong Kong, attended the foundation stone-laying ceremony; The school was moved to the present location, to commemorate the generous donation from Sir Shiu-kin Tang, the school's name was changed to "Tang Siu Kin Victoria Technical school"; And this year girls were admitted to the school.

Pui-Lam Hon (1987–1988)

In 1987, Hon took the post of acting Headmaster in the school.

Chi-sau Ma (1988–1992)

In 1988, Ma became the Headmaster and the school had 32 classes.

Siu-Leung Ma (1992–1994)

In 1992, Ma took the post of principal and established the Parent Teacher Association(PTA);also he carried out "New Measures on School's Administration", which caused the parents, the alumnus and teachers can participate in the school's administration.

Tak-chi IP (1994–1997)

In 1994, Ip became the Headmaster, this school carried on with the improvement on school facilities, the number of classroom was increased from 23 to 26 and a Student Activity Centre at 5/F was established; Students can have the opportunity to express their opinion to the school authority through 'Talk with VGS' starting from this year.

Suk-fun Chiu (1997–2007)

In 1997, Chiu Suk Fun took the post and became the first Headmistress in VGS. She was devoted to the continuation of educational development in the information science and technology. Teaching drama through the medium of English, with the curriculum development in "the seed plan". Apart from that, she introduced the education model from Europe and America, carrying with "the whole development plan for students", and enables students to advance together.

Ms Siu-bing Ng (2007–2009)

In 2003, she was transferred to a new post and became the assistant Headmistress of VGS. In 2007, she took over the post of Headmistress.

Man-kai Leung (2009–2014)

In 2009, Man-kai Leung had become the Headmistress of TSKVGSS. She retired in 2014.

Yin-yin Luk Sze (2014–2016)

In 2014, Luk Sze Yin Yin had become the Headmistress of TSKVGSS. She retired in 2016.

Yan-kei Chan (2016–)

Since September 2016, Yan-kei Chan has become the headmaster of TSKVGSS.

== Facilities ==
Classroom: 26 in total. All are equipped with air-conditioning system, computers and the Central Broadcast System.

Special Rooms: to provide better facilities and environment for the learning needs of all subjects.

Sports and leisurement: The school has a basketball court, multi-purpose outdoor stadium and a covered playground.

History Museum of VGS: Located in the Car Park, which shows the history and development of the school.

Others : Assembly hall(Shiu Kin Hall), library, medical room, student activity room, meeting rooms, counseling rooms, prefect room, an information technology learning centre and a multimedia learning centre and language room.

== Houses ==
Student are randomly assigned to four houses starting from F.1 and they are: RED, YELLOW, BLUE and GREEN.

== Notable alumni ==
- Dion Chen: principal of Ying Wa College and former principal of YMCA of Hong Kong Christian College
