= Tin Lok Lane =

Street in Hong Kong

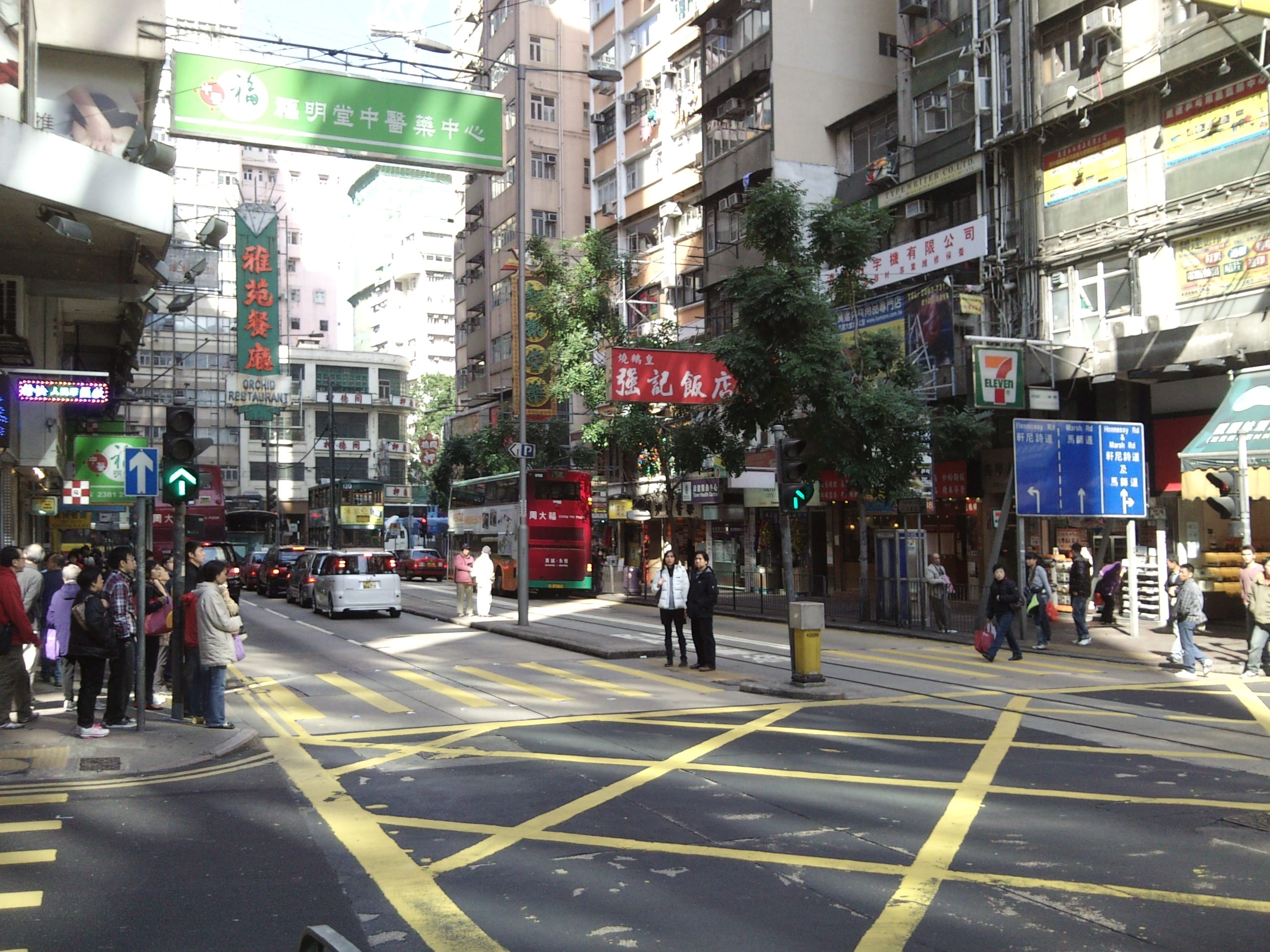
View of Tin Lok Lane from Wan Chai Road looking toward Hennessy Road.

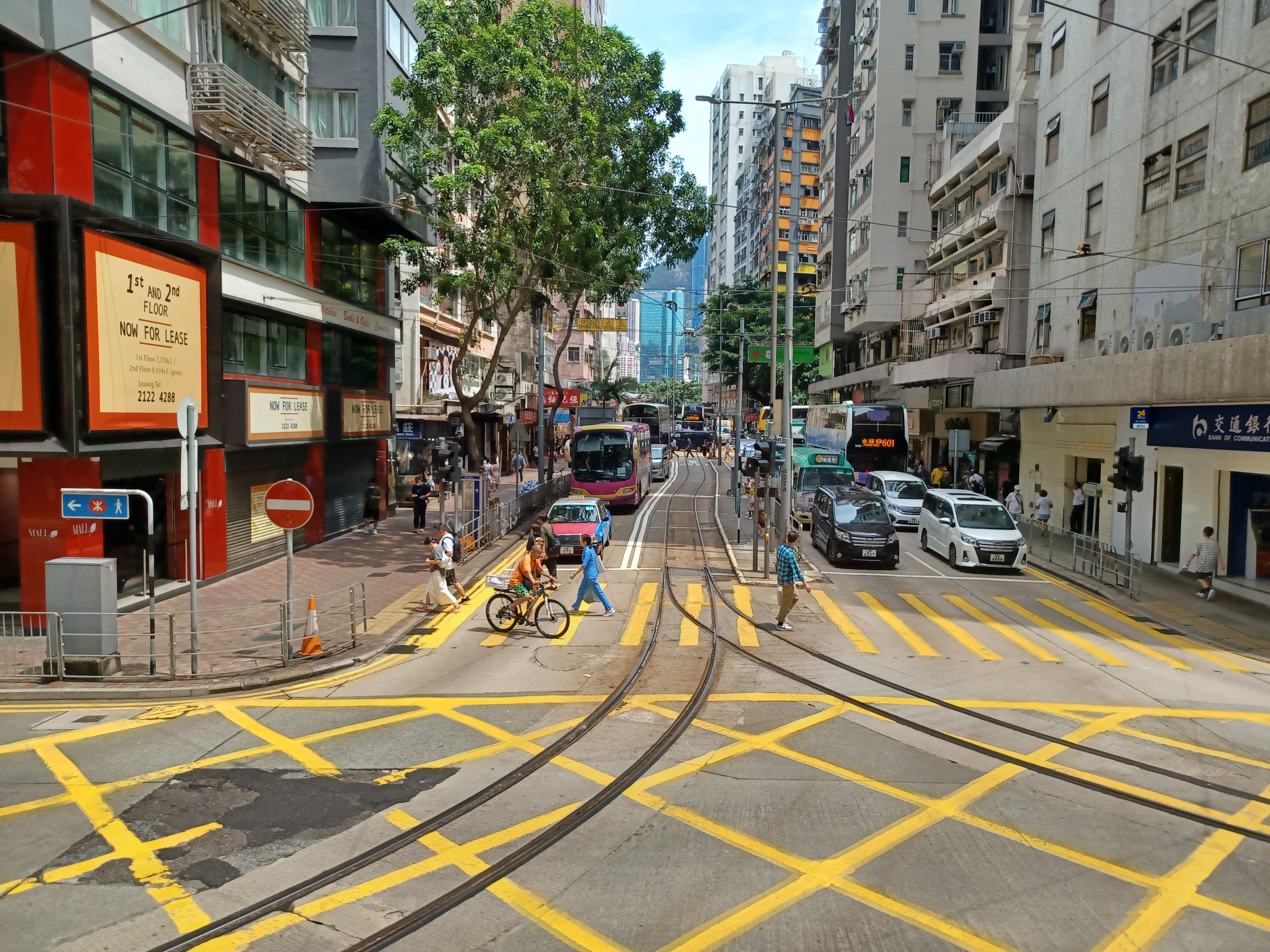
View of Tin Lok Lane from Hennessy Road looking toward Wan Chai Road.

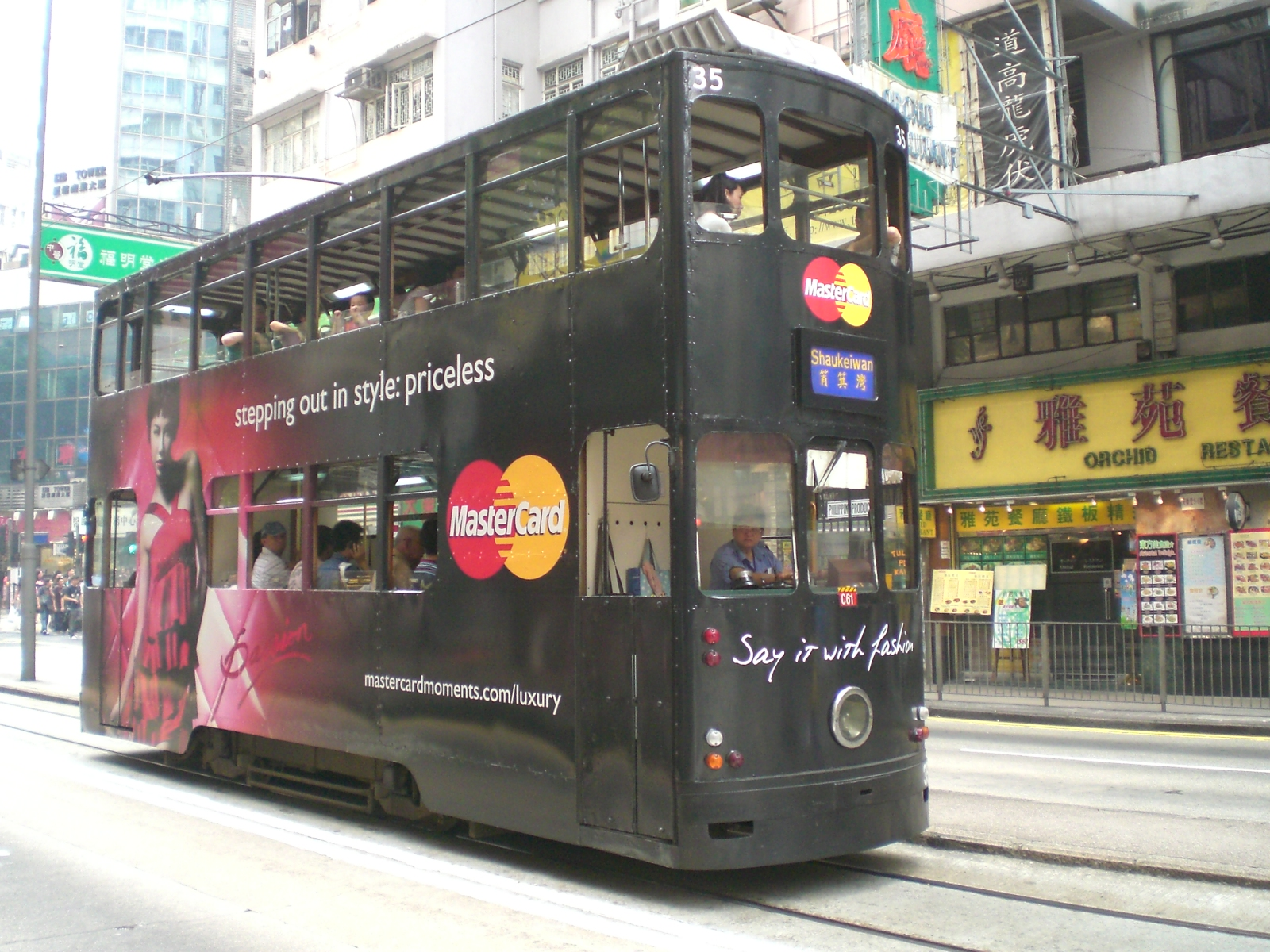
Hong Kong Tramways tram stop in Tin Lok Lane.

Tin Lok Lane (Chinese: 天樂里), is a street in Wan Chai between Hennessy Road and Wan Chai Road.

== Location ==
Tin Lok Lane runs north-south from Hennessy Road to Wan Chai Road. After reaching Wan Chai Road, the street continues southward as Morrison Hill Road.

== History ==
Before Lockhart Road was built, Tin Lok Lane had a beach at Observation Point. The road originally was known as Observation Place as it was where Captain Edward Belcher of HMS Sulphur, who surveyed Hong Kong in January 1841, initially recorded his first readings of latitude and longitude.

In the 1890s, Tin Lok Lane was a narrow street, however, since the 1930s, it became a main road, and there were funeral houses, those funeral houses relocated to other areas after the 1960s.

Prior to the First World War, aging prostitutes—a large number of whom were from Vienna—lived in Tin Tok Lane and charged $2 for their services. Ta Kung Pao reported that in the 1900s, Tin Lok Lane was where Western sailors sought entertainment. The state-run opium factory remained located at the farthest point of Tin Lok Lane at the onset of the First World War. The South China Morning Post reported that "half naked coolies" were visible mixing simmering opium in pans. The name Tin Lok Lane in Chinese means "Lane of Heavenly Happiness" which the South China Morning Post said likely can be traced back to such endeavors. The street was renamed from Observation Place to Tin Lok Lane as part of a trend to use more Chinese names. The Far Eastern Association of Tropical Medicine said in 1912: "this may relate to the heavenly bodies from which the observations were taken, or more probably perhaps it refers to the fact that the street or lane leads to the Happy Valley; but in any case the neighbourhood is practically a European one and it is difficult to understand the reason for the change of designation".

In the 1930 and 1940s, Hong Kong funeral services used to gather in Wan Chai and closed to the cemetery in Happy Valley. The Hong Kong Funeral Home was located on Wan Chai Road and it stored selling traditional Chinese coffin on Tin Lok Lane.

The government worked in 1977 to increase the width of Tin Lok Lane and Morrison Hill Road. Both roads had intense traffic and were crucial for drivers in Wan Chai to cross the Cross-Harbour Tunnel. In 2001, the lane had lots of traffic though just ten shops and a street sign showing three characters.

== Features ==
There are some fast food shops, cafes and restaurants.

== Transport ==
The Happy Valley branch of the Hong Kong Tramways branches out from the main line along Hennessy Road and runs southward through Tin Lok Lane. A tram stop of this branch is located in the street, near its intersection with Hennessy Road.
