= Sheng Kung Hui Tang Shiu Kin Secondary School =

Government-aided school in Hong Kong

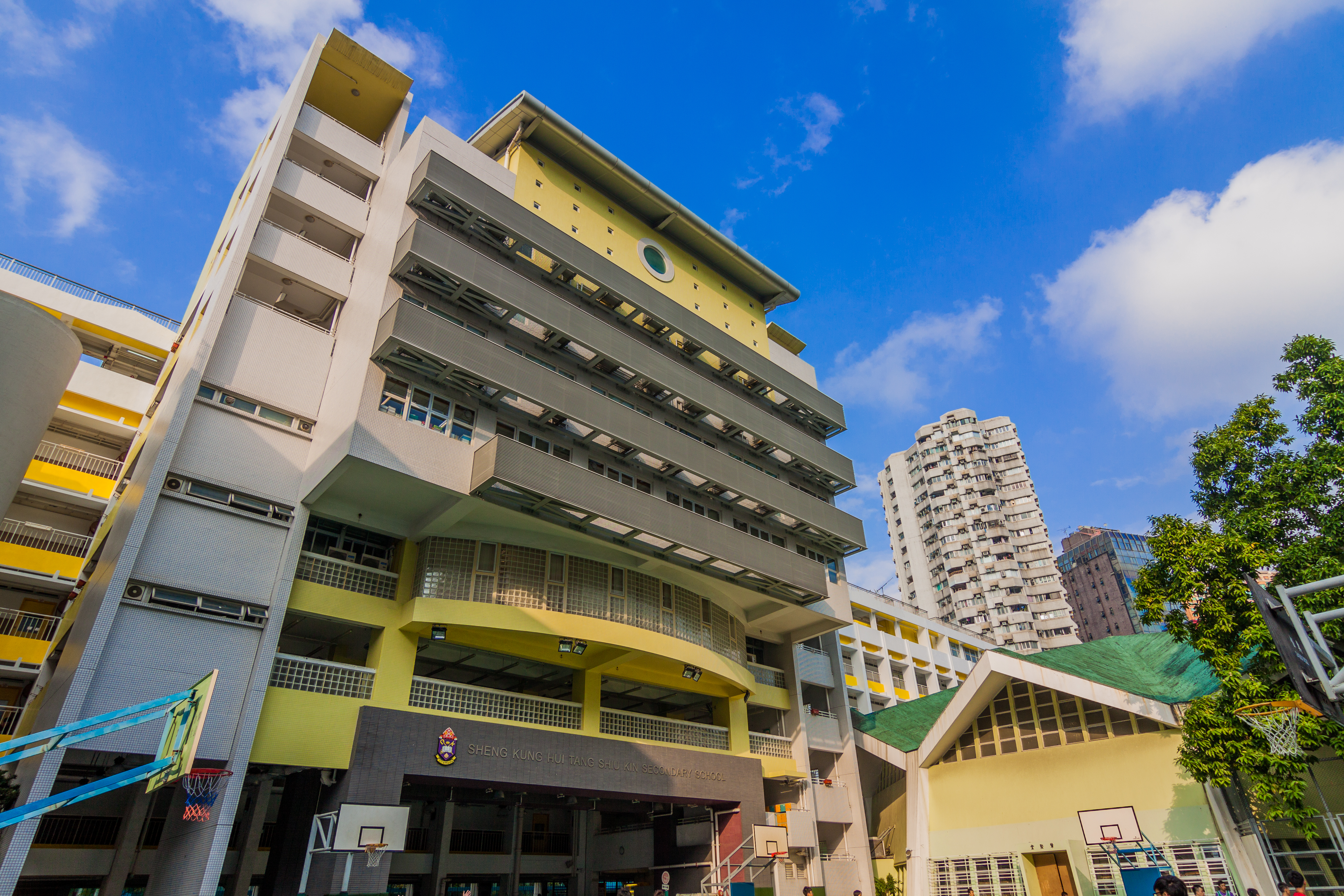

Location
- 9 Oi Kwan Road, Wan Chai, Hong Kong
- Coordinates: 22°16′33″N 114°10′44″E

Information
- Type: government-aided
- Motto: HYPOMONE
- Religious affiliation: Christian
- Established: 1962
- Principal: Mr. Yuen King Hang
- Gender: Co-educational
- Language: English
- Affiliation: Hong Kong Sheng Kung Hui
- Website: www.tsk.edu.hk

Sheng Kung Hui Tang Shiu Kin Secondary School (Chinese: 聖公會鄧肇堅中學) was founded by Sheng Kung Hui, the Anglican church in the then colony, in 1962. It is located at 9 Oi Kwan Road, Morrison Hill, Wan Chai, Hong Kong. It is one of the 114 English as the medium of instruction schools (EMI schools) in Hong Kong. It is also a Christian-based school. The principal is Mr. YUEN King-Hang.

== School history ==
The History Gallery was established in 2005. It comprises various zones - History of our School, Campus life in different decades, Collection of students' prizes and awards, Articles of old boys and girls. Through the display of photos and exhibits including school press and magazines, badges, graduates' magazines, old note books of students, the History Gallery outlined the historical development of our school vividly. Apart from permanent exhibition, special exhibitions are held regularly. By preserving all treasurable pieces of the School in the History Gallery, we have captured the unique tradition and culture of the school, of which all students, alumni, teachers, parents, friends ... can share the happy moments together.

== Houses ==
Name	Color
Anselm	Purple
Bancroft	Green
Cranmer	Magenta
Grindal	Orange

== Student–teacher ratio ==
Total Students: 1153 (Including 1 foreign exchange student)

Teachers: 61

Student–teacher ratio: 1:19

== Student Association ==
- 2003-2004 Voice
- 2004-2005 Fidelity
- 2005-2006 Triglot
- 2006-2007 Devote
- 2007-2008 NASA
- 2008-2009 Zenith
- 2009-2010 APEX
- 2010-2011 Nova
- 2011-2012 Meteor
- 2012-2013 Nebulas
- 2013-2014 Unity
- 2014-2015 Pioneer
- 2015-2016 Aorta
- 2016-2017 Delta
- 2017-2018 Innovator
- 2020-2021 Polaris
- 2021-2022 Arcadia
- 2022-2023 Apostle
- 2023-2024 Petrichor
- 2024-2025 Crescent
- 2025-2026 Potentia

== Gallery ==
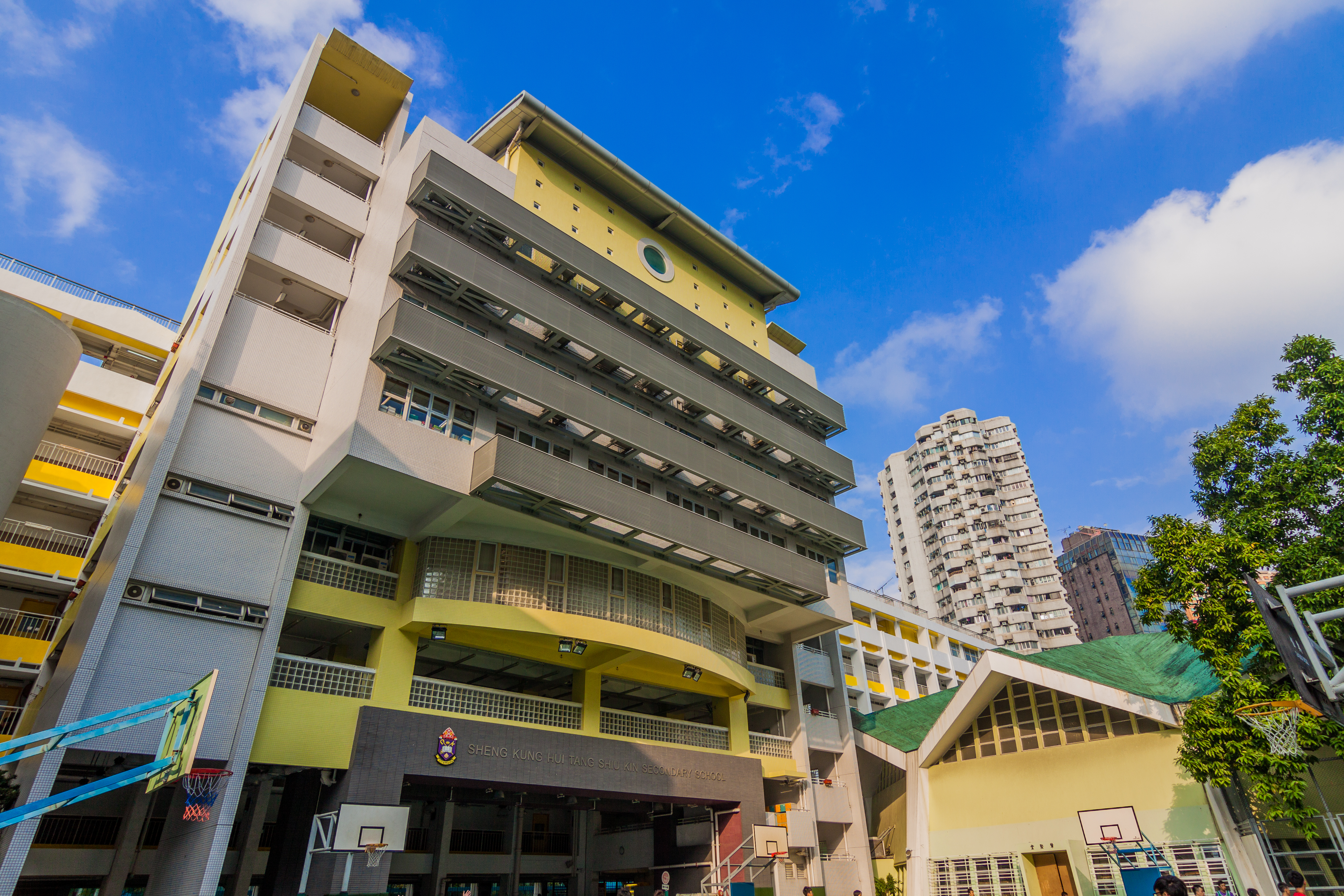
New Wing from interior

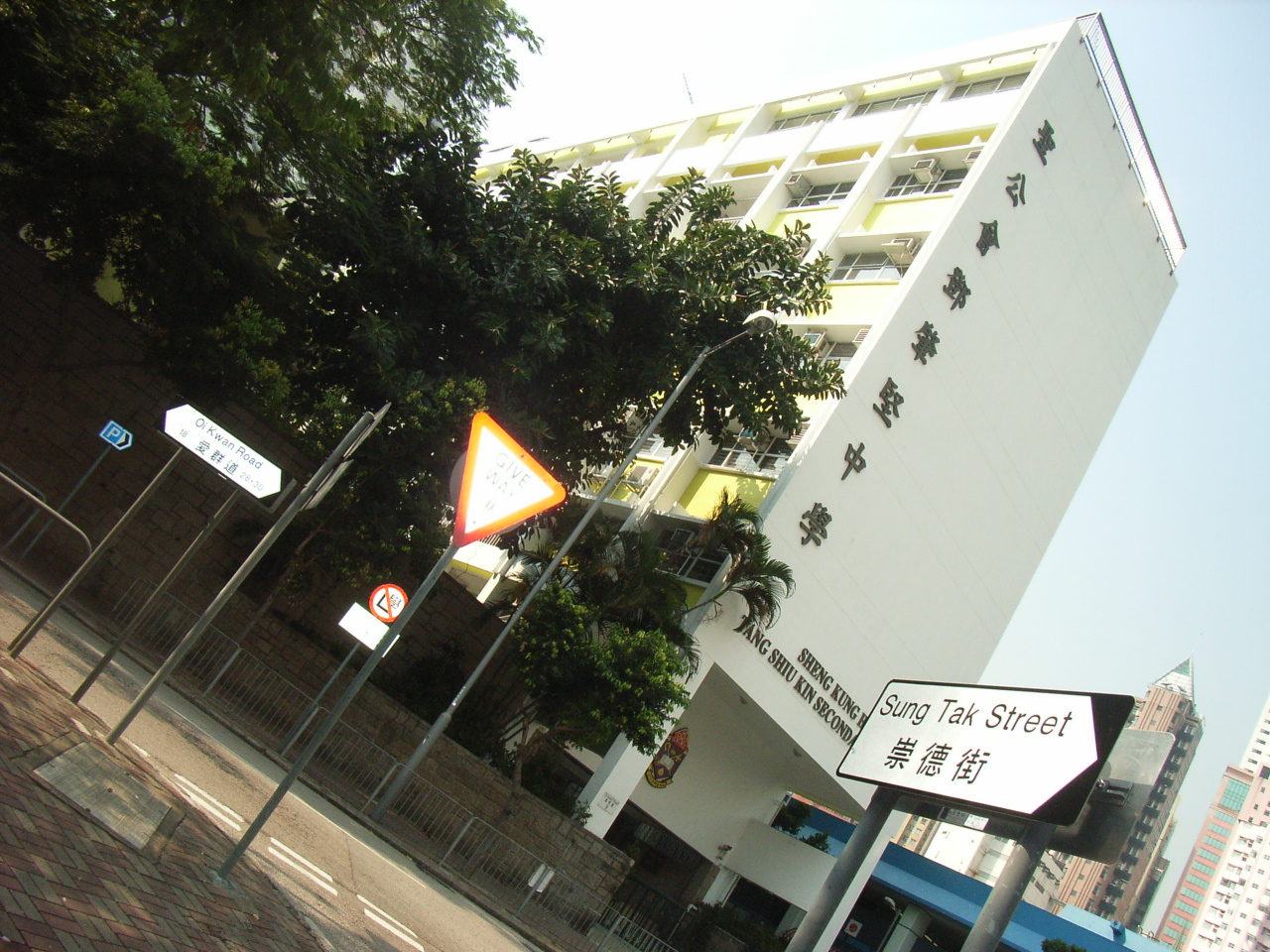
From East

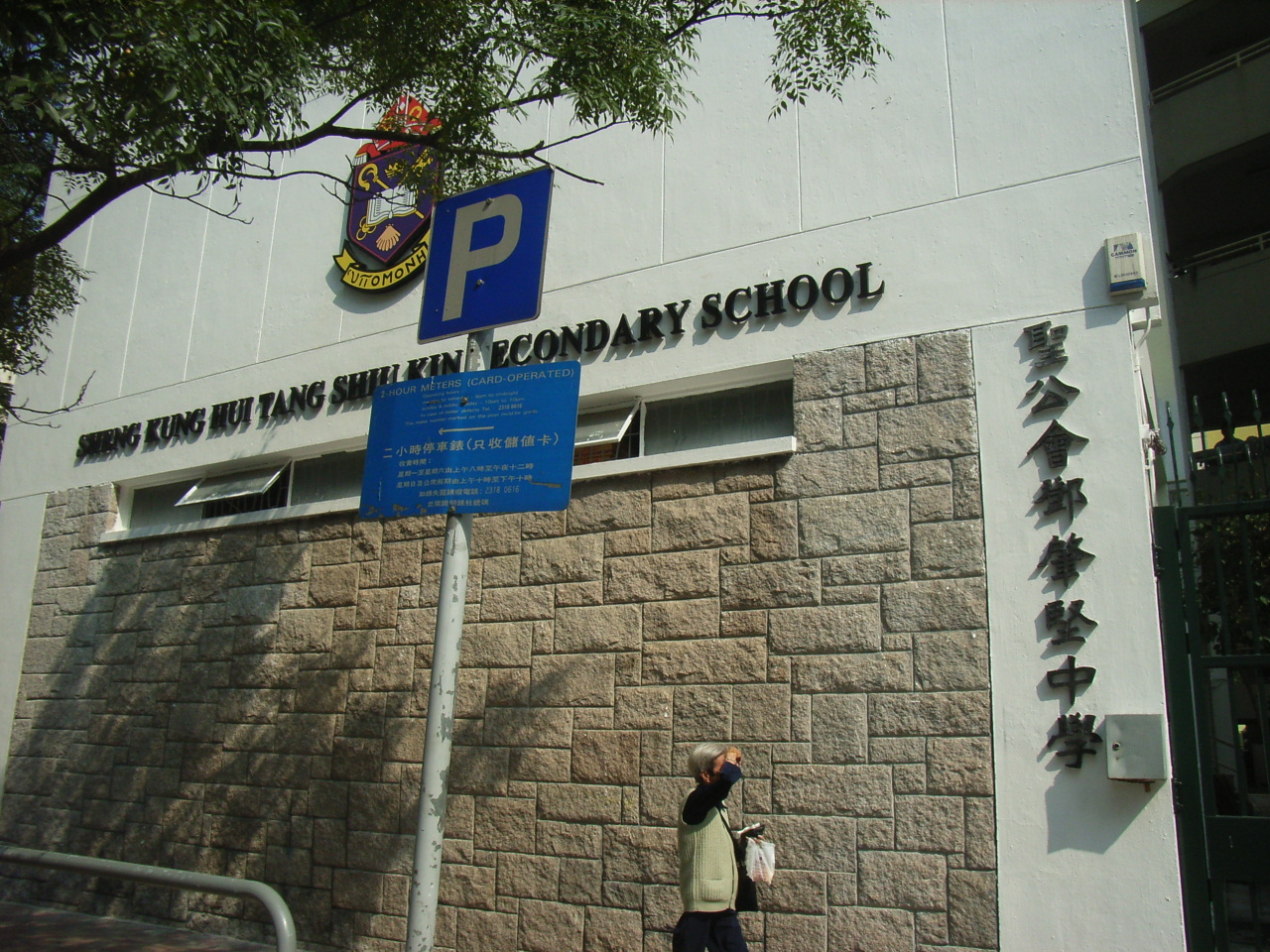
From West

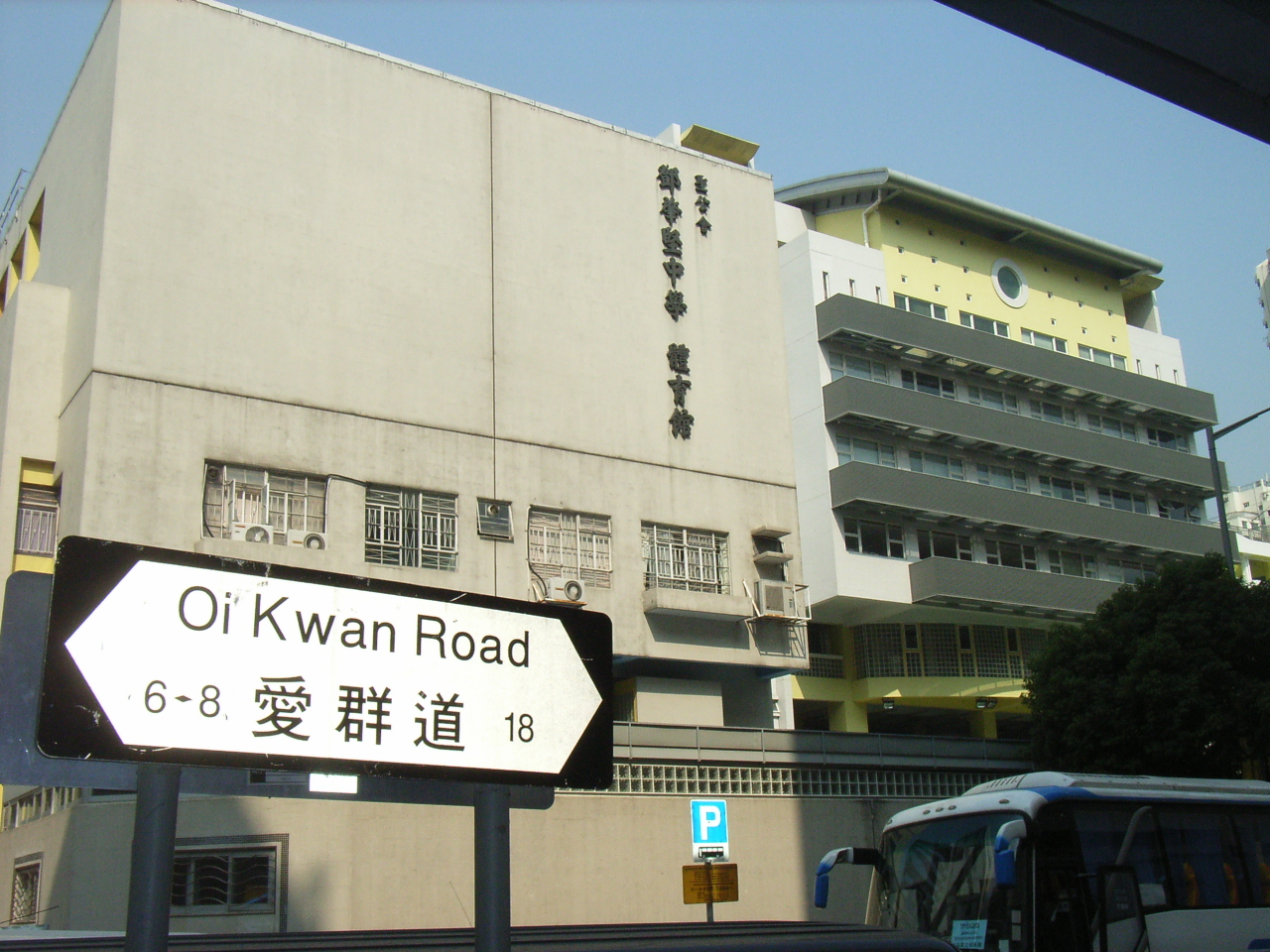
From South
