= Morrison Hill Swimming Pool =

Swimming pool complex in Hong Kong

Coordinates: 22.2763°N 114.1786°E

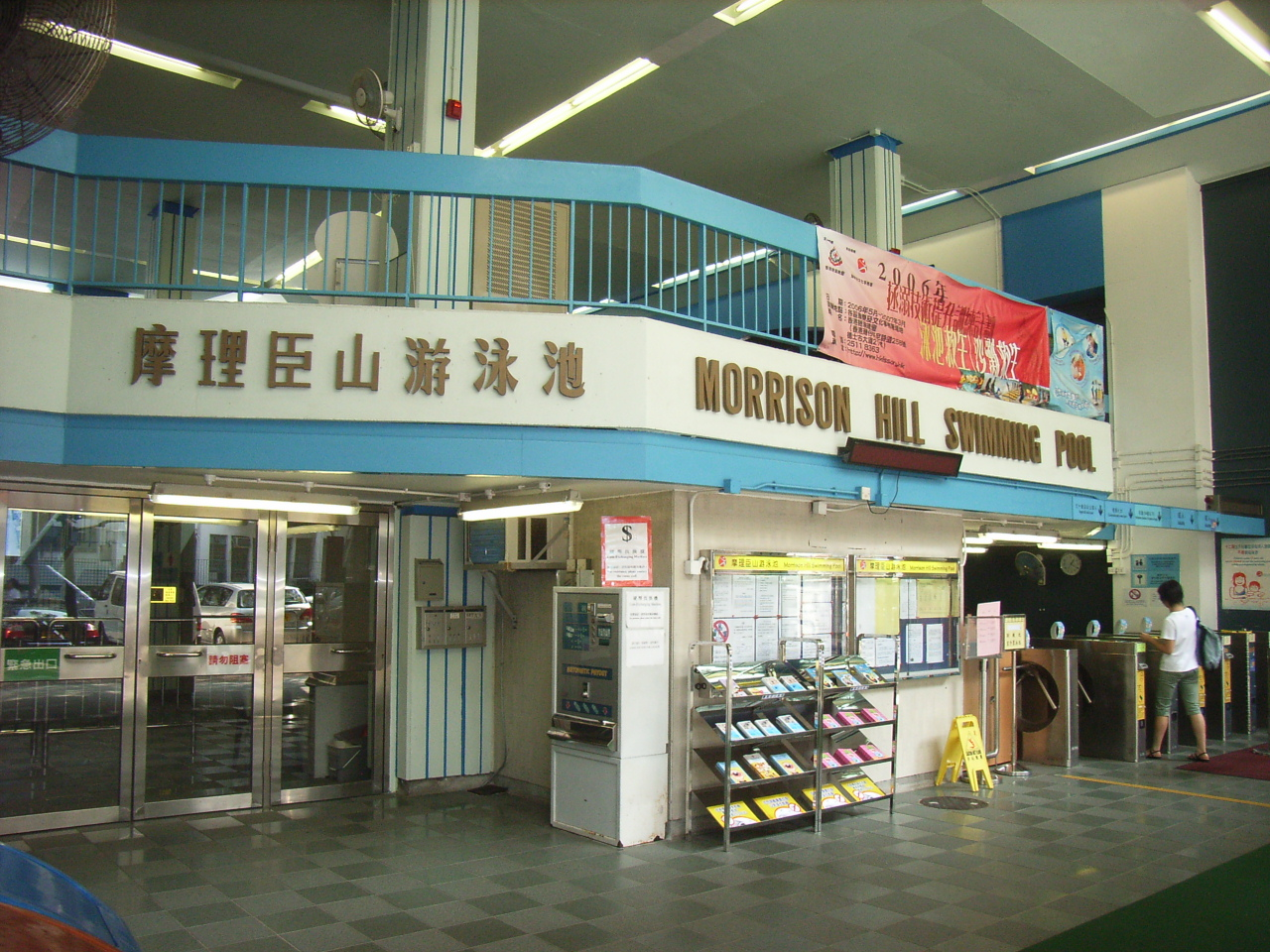
- Entrance
- Interactive map of Morrison Hill Swimming Pool
- Location: 7 Oi Kwan Road, Wan Chai, Hong Kong
- Operator: Leisure and Cultural Services Department
- Type: Indoor and outdoor

Construction
- Opened: 31 October 1972; 53 years ago
- Construction cost: HK$8 million (1972)
- Architect: Sam Lim

Website
- Official website

Morrison Hill Swimming Pool
- Chinese: 摩理臣山游泳池
Transcriptions
Standard Mandarin
- Hanyu Pinyin: Mólǐchén Shān Yóuyǒngchí
Yue: Cantonese
- Jyutping: mo1 lei5 san4 saan1 jau4 wing6 ci4

The Morrison Hill Swimming Pool (Chinese: 摩理臣山游泳池) is a public swimming pool complex in Morrison Hill, Wan Chai, Hong Kong. It was the first indoor public pool in Hong Kong as well as the first heated public pool.

== History ==
The Morrison Hill Swimming Pool was officially opened on 31 October 1972 by Sir Douglas Clague. The Royal Hong Kong Jockey Club donated over HK$8 million towards the complex's construction. At opening, the swimming complex comprised a heated 50-metre heated main pool, an outdoor pool, and a paddling pool for young children. It was designed by architect Sam Lim. The pool was operated by the Urban Council until 2000.

A second indoor pool was opened to the public on 28 June 1982. It was the Urban Council's first indoor teaching pool, and the first in Hong Kong equipped with a ramp for the convenience of disabled people. It cost HK$5.2 million.

In 2000, when the Urban Council was disbanded, management of the pool was taken up by the newly-formed Leisure and Cultural Services Department.

== Facilities ==
Today, the swimming complex has four pools. Indoors, there is a 50-metre main pool with a 203-seat spectator stand, as well as a smaller training pool. The outdoor pool deck is home to a teaching pool and a toddler's pool.
