= Morrison Hill =

Area and location of a hill in Hong Kong

Coordinates: 22.27538°N 114.17969°E

- Chinese: 摩理臣山
Transcriptions
Standard Mandarin
- Hanyu Pinyin: Mólǐchén Shān
Yue: Cantonese
- Jyutping: mo1 lei5 san4 saan1

Alternative Chinese name
- Chinese: 摩利臣山
Transcriptions
Standard Mandarin
- Hanyu Pinyin: Mólìchén Shān
Yue: Cantonese
- Jyutping: mo1 lei6 san4 saan1

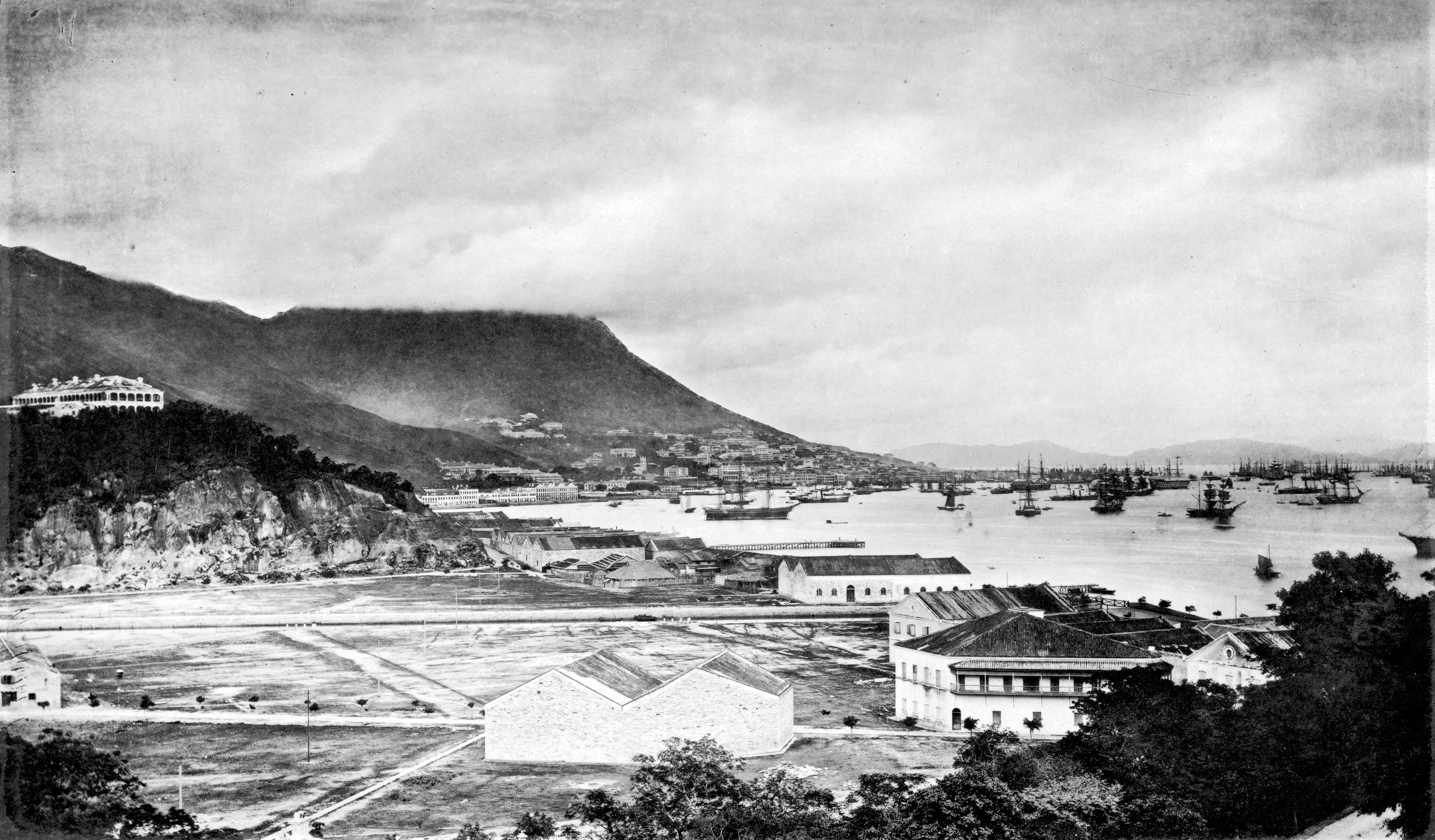
View from East Point in the late 1860s. Photograph by John Thomson. The original caption read: "The eminence to the left is Morrison's Hill, crowned with a row of substantially built foreign residences, and commanding an extensive and imposing view of the city and ports."

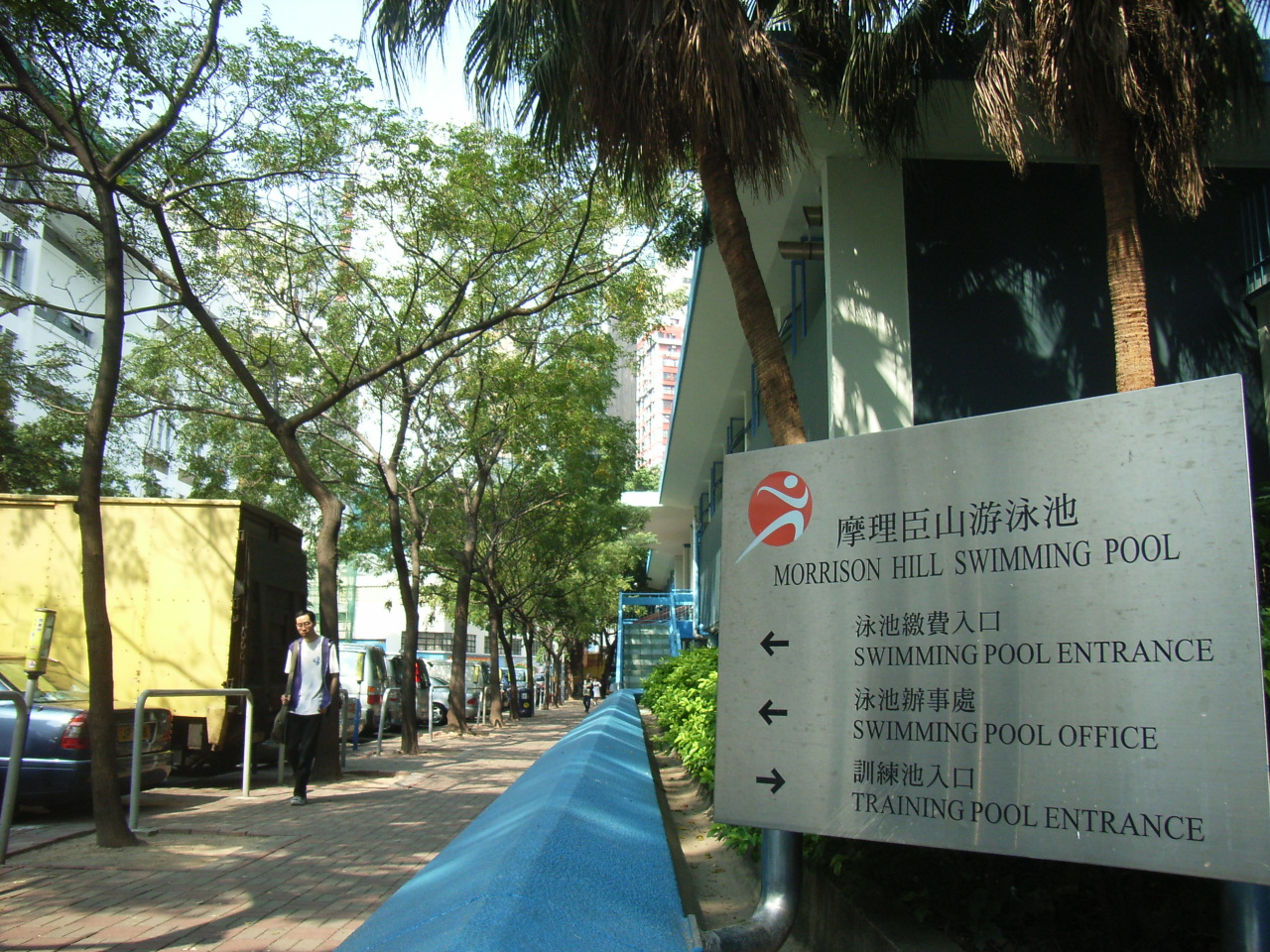
The west side of Oi Kwan Road looking north, near the entrance to Morrison Hill Swimming Pool.

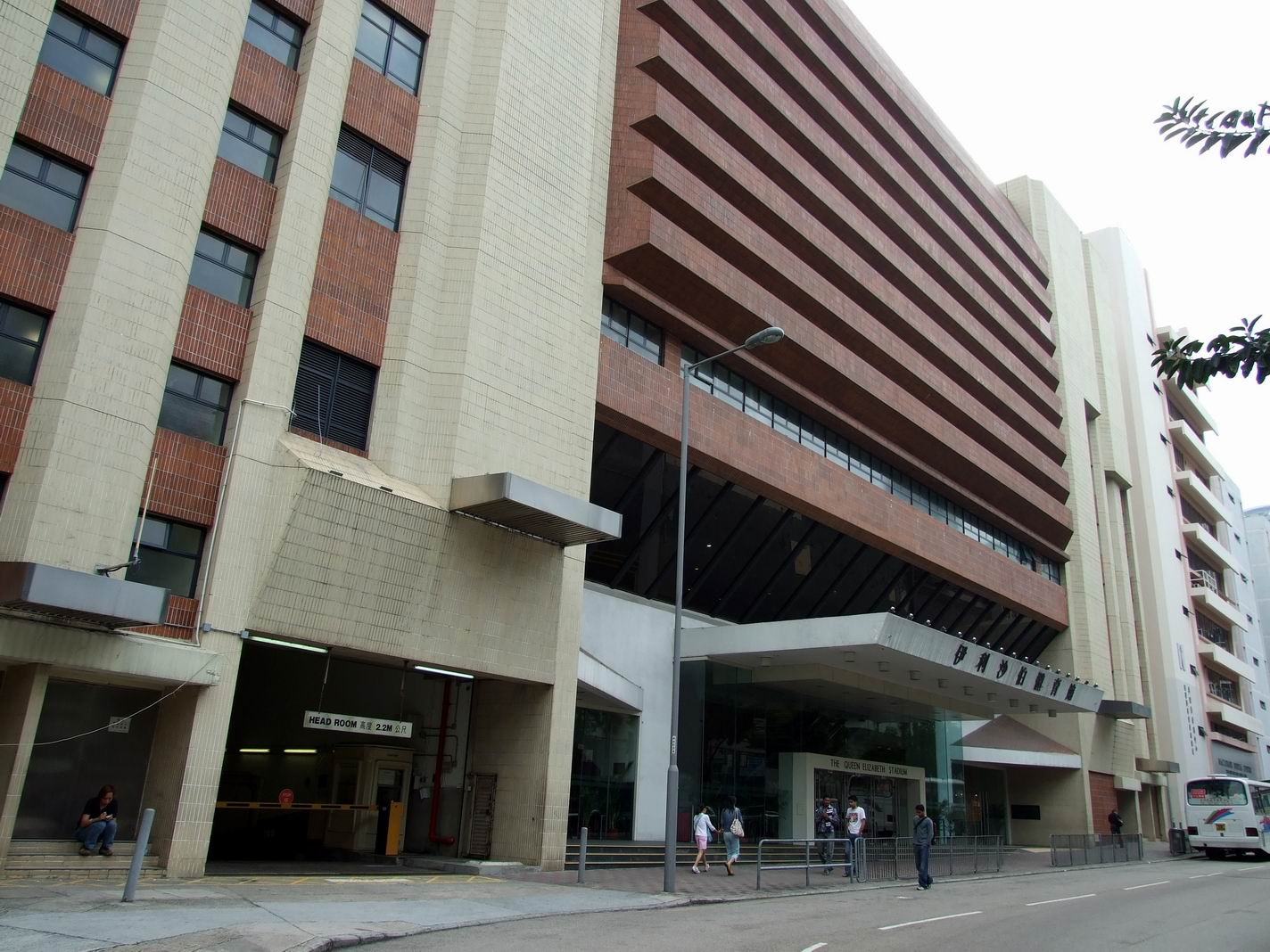
Queen Elizabeth Stadium on Oi Kwan Road.

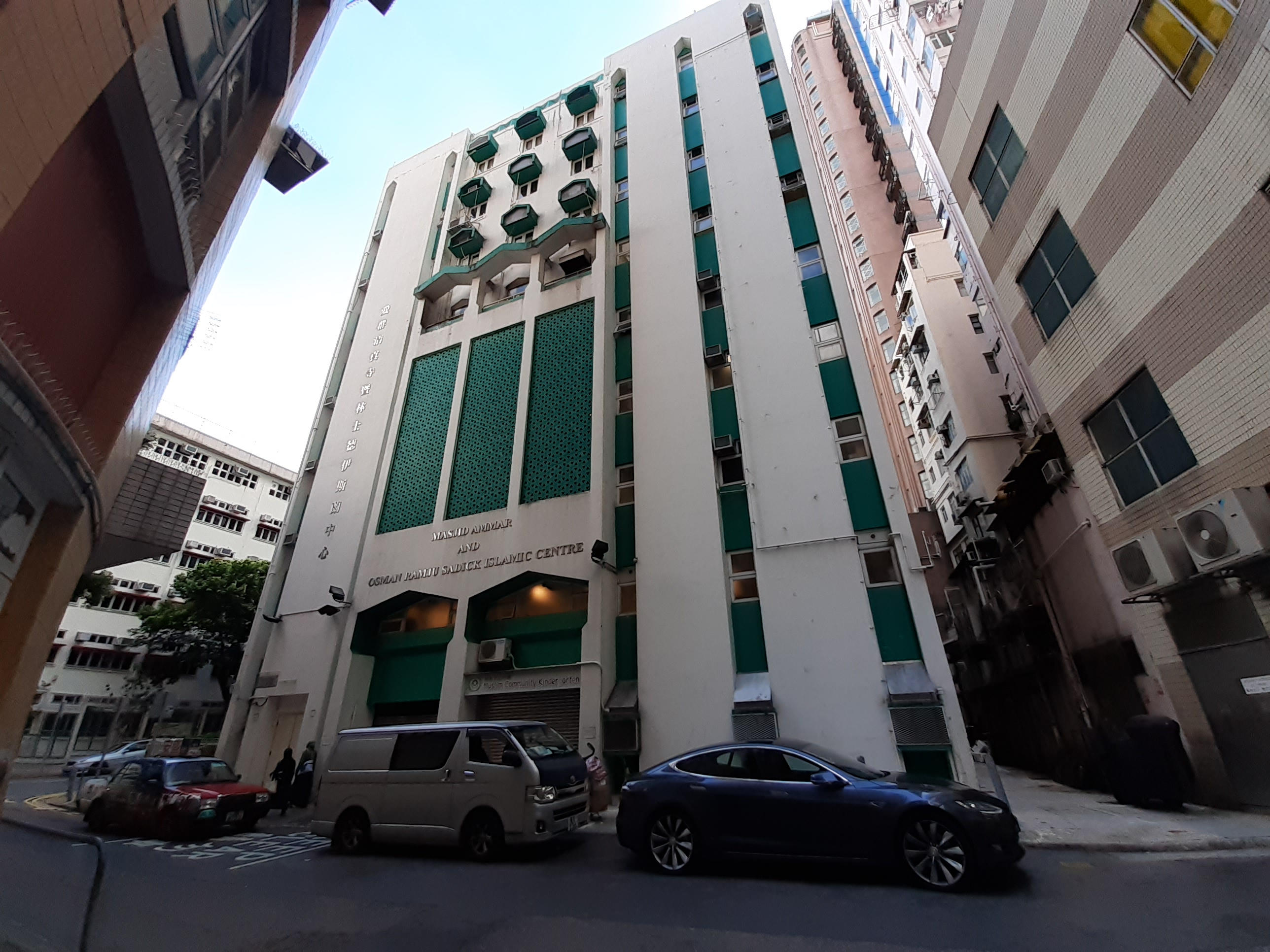
Masjid Ammar and Osman Ramju Sadick Islamic Centre on Oi Kwan Road.

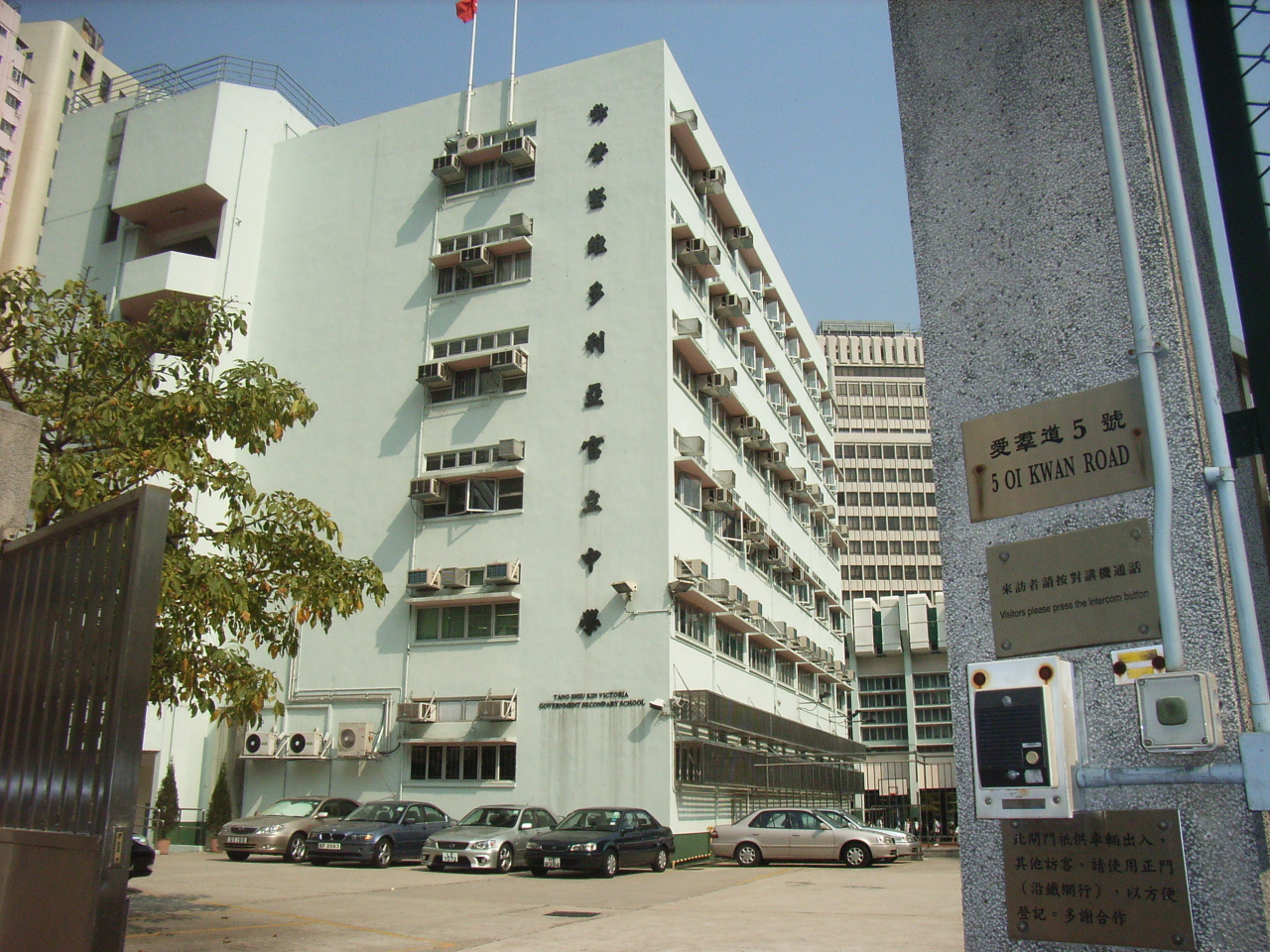
The northeastern entrance to TSK Victoria Government Secondary School on Oi Kwan Road.

Morrison Hill (Chinese: 摩理臣山 or 摩利臣山) is an area – and the former location of the eponymous hill between Wan Chai and Bowrington – on Hong Kong Island. Morrison Hill was once a quarry, providing materials for Hong Kong's early reclamation projects.

== History ==
Standing 200 feet (61 metres) high, the hill was located on the seashore; it was named for Protestant missionary and linguist Dr Robert Morrison, who travelled through the region as part of the Morrison Education Society.

In the 1920s, as part of the Praya East Reclamation Scheme, Morrison Hill was selected as a quarry to mine its constituent rock/earth for the project. The reclaimed materials were transported via wagons on temporary railway tracks which ran alongside Bowrington Canal.

The hill was progressively levelled over the decades before disappearing from the landscape completely in the 1960s; the only physical remnant of its existence is a single stone wall which was preserved, and forms part of the Hennessy Road Playground.

== Features ==
Today, Oi Kwan Road (愛群道) (lit. "Caring for the Community Road") is built on the footprint of Morrison Hill. The one-way road runs clockwise in a continuous circle, and is intersected to the north by Tak Yan Street and Yat Sin Street; to the east by Sung Yin Lane and Sung Tak Street; and to the west by Wing Cheung Street. A short ladder street called Shiu Kin Lane connects Oi Kwan Road with Queen's Road East in the south, alongside an unnamed alleyway which runs between the Queen Elizabeth Stadium and Tang Shiu Kin Hospital. The central section of the road is home to the Morrison Hill Swimming Pool and two secondary schools.

There is also a major road named for the hill – Morrison Hill Road (摩理臣山道) – connecting Tin Lok Lane and Leighton Road, which runs to the east of Oi Kwan Road.

=== Facilities along Oi Kwan Road ===
Amenity facilities include:

- Queen Elizabeth Stadium
- Morrison Hill Swimming Pool

Medical establishments include:

- Tang Shiu Kin Hospital
- Tang Chi Ngong Specialist Clinic
- MacLehose Dental Centre

Educational institutions include:

- Hong Kong Institute of Vocational Education (Morrison Hill) (with the headquarters of Vocation Training Council by its side),
- Lady Trench Training Centre
- Tang Shiu Kin Victoria Government Secondary School
- Sheng Kung Hui Tang Shiu Kin Secondary School

Other major facilities include:

- The Scout Association of Hong Kong Regional Headquarters
- Tang Shiu Kin Social Service Centre
- Ammar Mosque and Osman Ramju Sadick Islamic Centre

Residential building include:

- Oi Kwan Court

== See also ==
- Khalsa Diwan Sikh Temple
- Mount Parish
