= St. Francis Xavier's College, Tai Kok Tsui =

St. Francis Xavier's College
- 聖芳濟書院
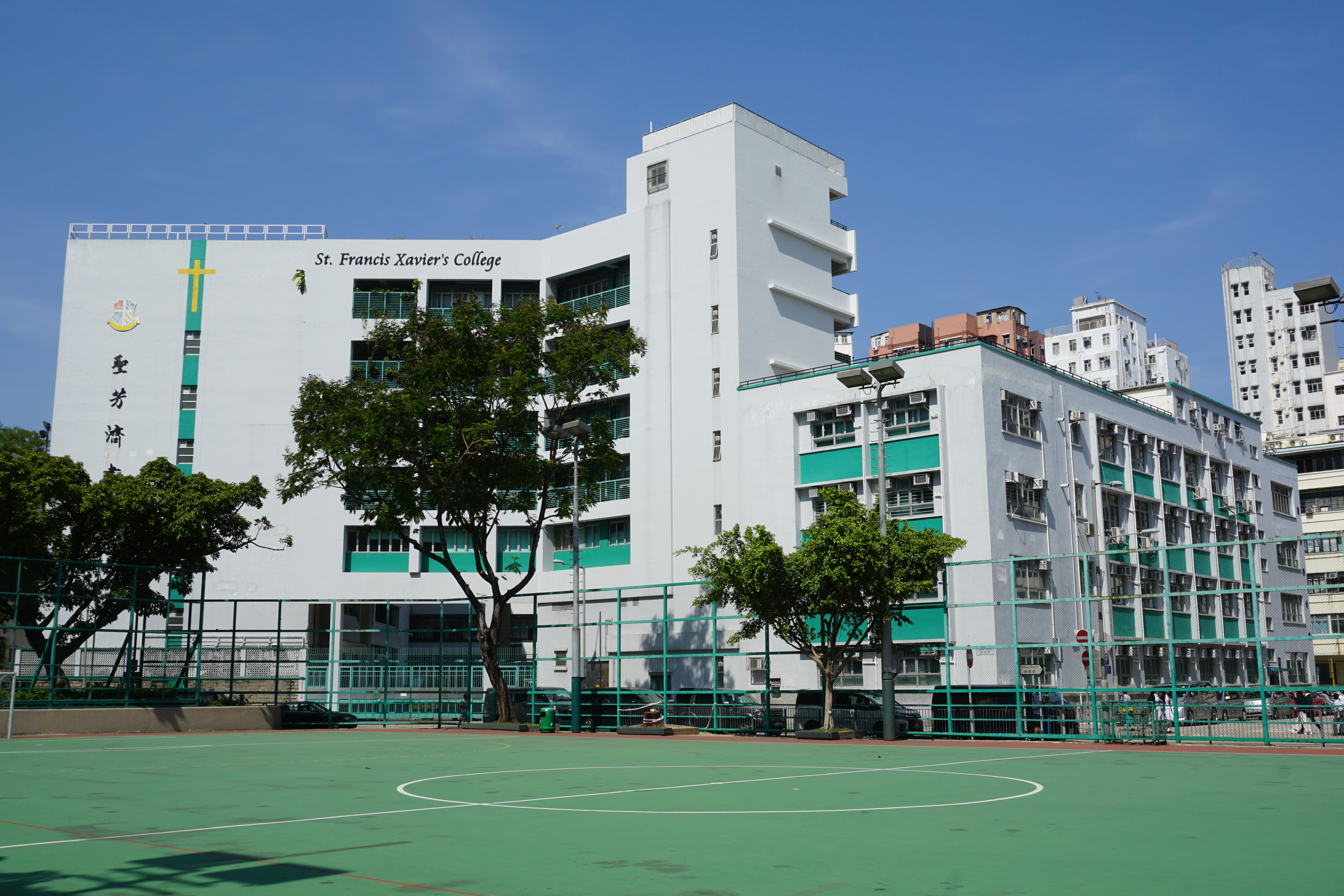

Location
- 45 Sycamore Street, Tai Kok Tsui; Kowloon; Hong Kong
- 22.3255°N 114.1631°E

Information
- Type: Catholic secondary
- Motto: Latin: Suaviter in Modo; Fortiter in Re (Gentle In Manner; Resolute In Action)
- Religious affiliation: Catholic
- Established: 9 December 1955; 70 years ago
- Principal: Leung Man Fai
- Faculty: 56
- Gender: Boys school
- Enrollment: 700
- Language: English, Chinese
- Website: www.sfxc.edu.hk

Chinese name
- Traditional Chinese: 聖芳濟書院
- Simplified Chinese: 圣芳济书院
Transcriptions
Standard Mandarin
- Hanyu Pinyin: Shèng Fāngjì Shūyuàn
Yue: Cantonese
- Jyutping: sing3 fong1 zai3 syu1 jyun6*2

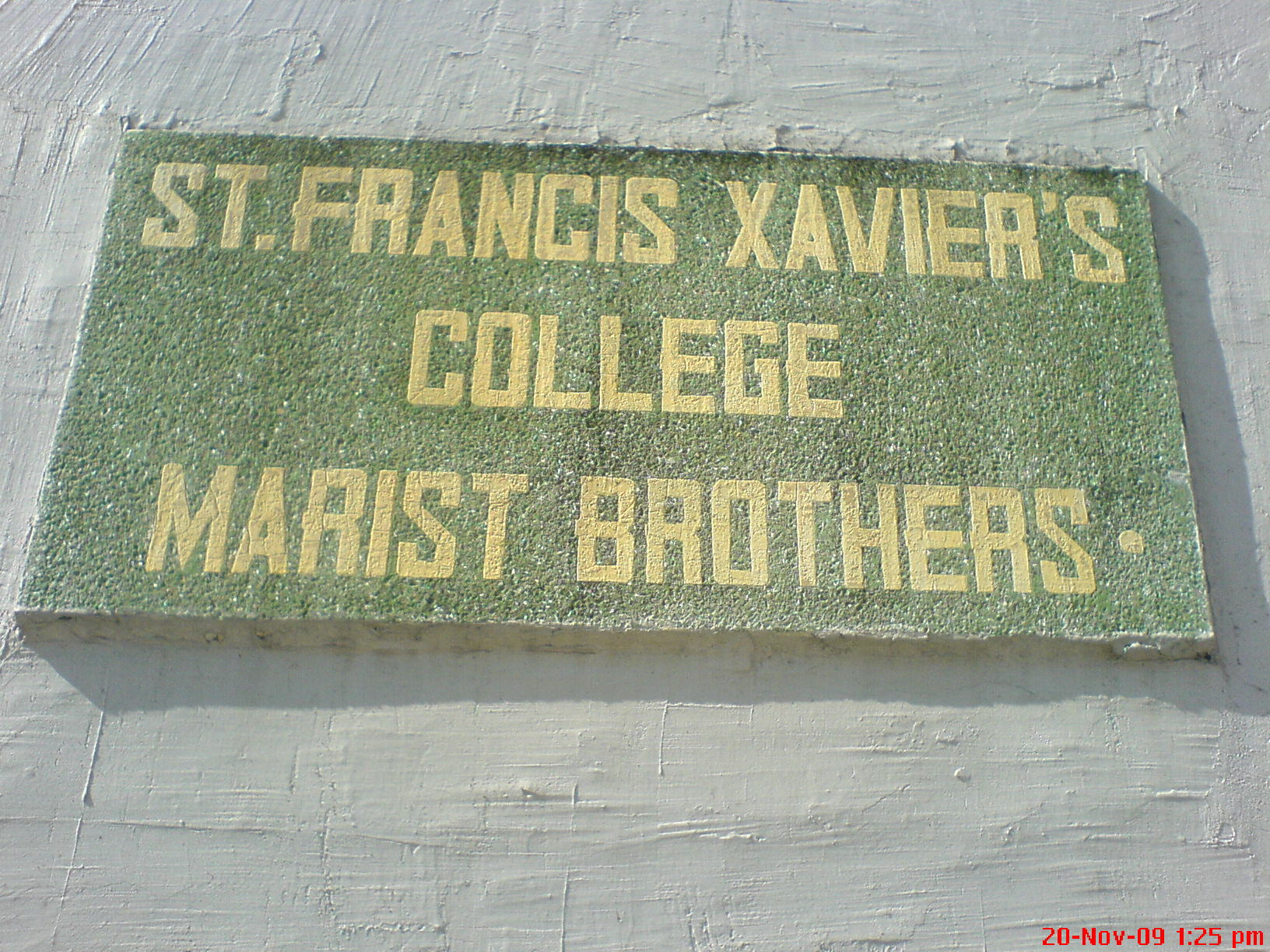
The relationship between SFXC and Marist Brothers

St. Francis Xavier's College (SFXC; Chinese: 聖芳濟書院 or 聖芳濟 in short) is a Catholic secondary school for boys run by the Marist Brothers, located in Tai Kok Tsui, Yau Tsim Mong District, Kowloon, Hong Kong. The school in Kowloon was founded in 1955, having moved from Shanghai, China. Except for lessons in foreign languages and Chinese, most lessons are taught in English.

== History ==
The school was founded by Jesuit Fathers in Shanghai in 1874, later in 1893 Marist Brothers were invited to teach in the college and took over full responsibility of it in 1895. Due to the religion policies of the Communist China, the Brothers were forced to leave Shanghai and moved to Hong Kong in 1949. The college was rebuilt and classes were resumed in Tai Kok Tsui at the junction of Maple Street and Sycamore Street (K.I.L. 6421) on 9 December 1955 and named St. Francis Xavier's College to emphasize the direct link with St. Francis Xavier's College, Shanghai.

== Location ==
As of 2022 the school has 56 teachers. The present principal is Mr. Leung Man Fai.

Students usually call themselves Xaverians.

The school motto is "Gentle in Manner, Resolute in Action". (Latin: Suaviter in modo Fortiter in re; 溫良剛毅)

This school is one of the three in Hong Kong that allows students to wear different coloured sports shoes to school, which is its characteristic. There are only ten school regulations, and they mostly cover actions to be taken when regulations are broken.

== Prayers ==
Students usually offer a short prayer before classes or in morning assemblies with 'Our Father', and will usually end the prayer with:

Lead: Saint Marcellin Champagnat,
Answer: Pray for us;
Lead: Saint Francis Xavier,
Answer: Pray for us.

== School badge ==
Middle

The Cross represents Jesus and the Catholic faith. It also means God is in every SFX activity.

Above left

Marist Brothers logo.

Above Right

Book represent knowledge and oil lamp represent light.

Below Right

White and green means purity and hope. These colours are also the representing colour of the school.

Below Left

「SFX」represents St. Francis Xavier, the Patron Saint of the school

Below

School motto

- Latin: Suaviter in modo Fortiter in re;
- Chinese: 溫良剛毅;
- English: Gentle in Manner, Resolute in Action

== School song ==
Let us sing with jubilation,
A song of duty done:
A song of exaltation,
Of laurels fought and won:
Of many glorious years in store,
A song to sound from shore to shore:
They've carved out a name in the roll of fame:
The boys of St. Francis Xavier's.

Uplift our voices to proclaim,
And let the whole world heed:
In class, in the field, at work, at play,
St. Xavier's take the lead.
Yet not alone for worldly fame,
Success or honour, wealth or name;
For God and our Faith, first place we claim:
The boys of St. Francis Xavier's.

Then, vivat, crescat, floreat,
As the years go rolling on,
And we leave our books and our benches,
And schooltime-joys are gone;
Whatever our future days may bring,
Our Alma Mater's praise we'll sing,
And at her feet new laurels fling:
The boys of St. Francis Xavier's.

== Notable alumni and staff ==
=== Politics and civil service ===
- David Lan Hong-tsung (藍鴻震), GBS, ISO, JP, former Secretary for Home Affairs.
- Francis Tam Pak Yuen (譚伯源), former Secretariat for Economy and Finance (Macau).
- Henry Fan Hung-ling (范鴻齡), SBS, JP, chairman of Hospital Authority, former managing director of CITIC Pacific and the vice-chairman of Cathay Pacific Airways.
- James Lau Yee-cheung (劉怡翔), GBS, JP, former Secretary for Financial Services and the Treasury.
- Nelson Lam Chi-yuen (林智遠), JP, the Director of Audit.
- Bruce Liu Sing-lee (廖成利), former member of the Legislative Council.
- Scott Leung Man-kwong (梁文廣), MH, member of the Legislative Council.
- Fung Chi-wood (馮智活), former member of the Legislative Council of Hong Kong, Regional Council, Shatin District Board Member, and a priest of the Hong Kong Anglican Church.

=== Law ===
- Kemal Bokhary (包致金), GBM, JP, judge of Hong Kong's Court of Final Appeal.
- Anthony Neoh (梁定邦), KC, SC, JP, Chief Adviser to the China Securities Regulatory Commission and former chairman of the Independent Police Complaints Council.

=== Business ===
- Eric Edward Hotung (何鸿章), grandson of Robert Hotung, billionaire businessman, financier, and philanthropist

=== Medical ===
- Francis Chan Ka-leung (陳家亮), SBS, JP, former Dean of the Faculty of Medicine, The Chinese University of Hong Kong.

=== Entertainment and mass media ===
- Bruce Lee (李小龍), internationally known martial arts instructor, actor, philosopher, film director, screenwriter, and martial arts founder.
- Samuel Hui (許冠傑), first major superstar of Cantopop.
- Eric Tsang (曾志偉), prolific actor, film director, film producer and television host.
- Dicky Cheung Wai Kin (張衛健), television actor/singer.
- Stephen Chan Chi-wan (陳志雲), former general manager of Television Broadcasts Limited.
- Ko Tin Lung (古天農), actor, director and radio presenter.
- Andrew Tuason (杜自持), musician, record producer, composer, songwriter, arranger, conductor and musical director.
- Cheang Pou-soi (鄭保瑞), film director, film producer and screenwriter.
- Teddy Chan (陳德森), film director, producer and actor.
- Lau Wan-kit (劉雲傑), comic artist.

=== Education and academia ===
- William Wong Kam-fai (黃錦輝), Associate Dean (External Affairs) of the Faculty of Engineering of the Chinese University of Hong Kong and member of the Legislative Council of Hong Kong for Election Committee constituency.

=== Science ===
- Brother Octavius William Borrell, Marist brother who taught at the College, and who studied the flora of Shanghai in the 1940s and 1990s.

== See also ==
- St. Francis Xavier's School, Tsuen Wan
- Education in Hong Kong
- List of schools in Hong Kong
- List of mainland Chinese schools reopened in Hong Kong
- List of Jesuit sites
