= Joseph Sung =

Hong Kong gastroenterologist

Joseph Sung Jao-yiu
- 沈祖堯
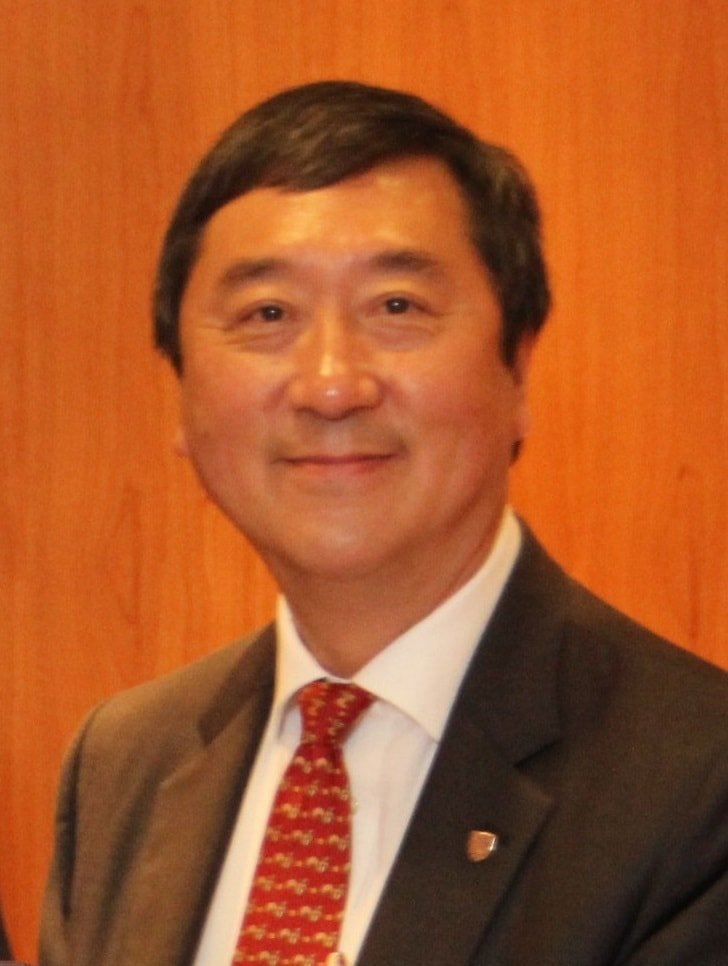

Dean of Lee Kong Chian School of Medicine, Nanyang Technological University
- Incumbent
- Assumed office 1 April 2021
- Preceded by: James Best

7th Vice-Chancellor and President of the Chinese University of Hong Kong
- In office 1 July 2010 – 31 December 2017
- Chancellor: Donald Tsang; Leung Chun-ying; Carrie Lam
- Preceded by: Lawrence Lau
- Succeeded by: Rocky Tuan

Personal details
- Born: 22 October 1959 (age 66) British Hong Kong
- Children: 2
- Education: University of Hong Kong (MBBS); University of Calgary (PhD); Chinese University of Hong Kong (MD)
- Scientific career
- Fields: Gastroenterology
- Workplaces: Chinese University of Hong Kong
- Thesis: Microbial ecology of the binary system (1991)
- Doctoral advisor: J. William F. Costerton

Chinese name
- Traditional Chinese: 沈祖堯
- Simplified Chinese: 沈祖尧
Transcriptions
Yue: Cantonese
- Yale Romanization: Sám Jóu Yìuh
- Jyutping: Sam^{2} Zou^{2} Jiu^{4}

Joseph Sung Jao-yiu SBS JP (Chinese: 沈祖堯; Jyutping: Sam2 Zou2 Jiu4, born 22 October 1959) is a Hong Kong physician and gastroenterologist, and the current dean of Lee Kong Chian School of Medicine at the Nanyang Technological University (NTU), also serving as the Senior Vice President (Health and Life Sciences) of NTU. Previously, he was the vice-chancellor and president of The Chinese University of Hong Kong (CUHK).

== Early life and education ==
Sung is of Ningbo, Zhejiang ancestry and was born in Hong Kong. His father was an optometrist in Shanghai before World War II. When war broke out, he moved to Hong Kong in 1937 and continued his practice.

The junior Sung was born in 1959; he went to the Chinese Children Institute for elementary school and entered Queen's College in 1971, finishing in 1976 after secondary five. After his internship at Queen Mary Hospital, spending six months each in medicine and orthopaedic surgery, he received his Bachelor of Medicine, Bachelor of Surgery degree from the University of Hong Kong in 1983. He then went to Canada to study microbial ecology in 1989, after being awarded a Croucher Foundation Fellowship. The 1-year scholarship was extended by six months only, but he was then awarded the Izaak Walton Killam Memorial Scholarship, the most prestigious graduate award in the University of Alberta, to cover the rest of his 3-year stay.

Sung obtained his PhD from the University of Calgary in 1991, and his Doctor of Medicine from The Chinese University of Hong Kong in 1997.

== Career ==
Before he went to Canada, Sung had joined the newly-opened Prince of Wales Hospital in 1984, first as a registrar in pathology, then as a medical officer in the medical department, and then as a fellow specialising in hepatology and gastroenterology.

After his PhD, in 1992, he became a lecturer at the Department of Medicine of The Chinese University of Hong Kong (CUHK). He was later promoted to Chair Professor at the Department of Medicine and Therapeutics and Chief of the Division of Gastroenterology and Hepatology at the same department (until 2006) in 1998, and became the Chairman of the Department of Medicine and Therapeutics next year, until stepping down in 2010 when he assumed the role of president and vice-chancellor of CUHK. Prior to that, Sung was also successively the associate dean (clinical) (2002–2004) and associate dean (general affairs) (2004–2009) of the CUHK Faculty of Medicine, and head of Shaw College (2008–2010). Sung was also appointed Mok Hing Yiu Professor of Medicine in 2007.

=== Presidency at The Chinese University of Hong Kong ===
Sung's seven-year presidency at CUHK began in 2010. His first few years oversaw the transition from the English 3-2-2-3 system to the current 3-3-4 system. As the new university entrance examination, the Hong Kong Diploma of Secondary Education, would debut in 2012, that year would see CUHK beginning its 4-year curriculum and a surge of undergraduate students. The first intake of students for the five new colleges, which were founded in 3–4 years prior for this transition, occurred between 2010 and 2012.

Sung also led the establishment of CUHK–Shenzhen in 2014, the planning for the CUHK Medical Centre and the CUHK Strategic Plan 2016–2020.

Sung has also been noted for his response to student activism. During the 2014 Hong Kong protests, Sung and Peter Mathieson, the then-president and vice chancellor of the University of Hong Kong, visited and talked to student protestors, in the hope of calming them down and preventing conflict, not to send any political message. Towards the end of his vice-chancellorship, he asked the CUHK Student Union to remove pro-independence posters from message boards, and warned that the university would remove them if the Student Union refused.

Although reappointed for a second term until 2018, he left his presidency early in 2017 and returned to the medical field.

=== Post-presidency ===
Sung sat on the 2019 Lui Che Woo Prize Welfare Betterment Prize Selection Panel.

In 2020, Sung was appointed as the Dean of Lee Kong Chian School of Medicine at NTU and Senior Vice President (Health and Life Sciences) at NTU; he took up the roles on 1 April 2021. He remains an Emeritus Professor at CUHK.

== Research ==
During the 2002–2004 SARS outbreak, as the Chairman of the Department of Medicine and Therapeutics, CUHK Faculty of Medicine and Chief of Service at the Department of Medicine and Therapeutics, Prince of Wales Hospital, Sung led the hospital in its response and studied the epidemiology and clinical aspect of the SARS virus, despite not being a respiratory system expert. The hospital was one of the epicenters, after an infected patient was treated there. Holding a Croucher Senior Research Fellowship, he went on a 6-month sabbatical in 2004 at Johns Hopkins Bloomberg School of Public Health; he became the Founding Director and Advisor of the CUHK Stanley Ho Centre for Emerging Infectious Diseases upon returning.

As a gastroenterologist, his research spans intestinal bleeding, Helicobacter pylori infection, peptic ulcer, and gastrointestinal cancer. His team was the first in showing a 1-week course of antibiotic therapy can cure H. pylori infection, treat peptic ulcer and minimize its relapse. He also pioneered the use of endoscopic procedure in treating ulcer bleeding, reducing the need for surgery. Sung also chaired the Asia Pacific Working Group on Colorectal Cancer, founded in 2004 with the goal to set up regional guidelines on the prevention and screening for colorectal cancer.

Sung has published over 1700 scientific articles, and was listed as a Highly Cited Researcher by Clarivate in 2018, 2019 and 2020. He has edited or authored more than 15 books, including Principles and Practice of Clinical Medicine in Asia (2nd ed.), Gastrointestinal Bleeding (2nd ed.) and Atlas of Clinical Gastrointestinal Endoscopy (3rd ed.). Sung has penned many chapters in major textbooks as well, including the Oxford Textbook of Medicine (6th ed.), Sleisenger and Fordtran's Gastrointestinal and Liver Disease (8th ed.) and Textbook of Gastroenterology (5th ed.).

== Personal life ==
Sung and his wife, an obstetrician and gynecologist, were both MBBS students at the University of Hong Kong, and they went to the same hospital for internship training. They got married on 1 January 1989. Both of them are Christians.

Sung's two daughters both pursued medicine. His elder daughter went to Diocesan Girls' School, and was admitted into CUHK Faculty of Medicine in 2011. His younger daughter was an MBChB student in the Global Physician-Leadership Stream at CUHK, as of 2019. In 2016 at her Year 2, she received the Innovation and Technology Scholarship Award from the Hong Kong Federation of Youth Groups, and went to study at the Centre for Integrative Medicine at the University of Toronto.

== Honours and awards ==
- Fellow of the Royal College of Physicians of Edinburgh (1995)
- Fellow of the Royal College of Physicians (1997)
- Outstanding Staff and Team Award, Hospital Authority, Hong Kong (1998)
- Fellow of the American College of Gastroenterology (1999)
- Fellow of the Royal Australasian College of Physicians (2000)
- Asian Hero, Time magazine (2003)
- CUHK Vice-Chancellor's Exemplary Teaching Award (2003)
- Silver Bauhinia Star, Hong Kong (2004)
- Fellow of the Royal College of Physicians and Surgeons of Glasgow (2005)
- Second Prize, Cheung Kong Scholars Program (2005)
- Cheung Kong Achievement Award, Cheung Kong Scholars Program (2005)
- Fellow of the American Gastroenterological Association (2006)
- Second Prize, State Scientific and Technological Progress Award, Ministry of Science and Technology, China (2007)
- Prevent Cancer Foundation Laurel Award - International Leadership (2008)
- Ho Leung Ho Lee Advancement Prize, Ho Leung Ho Lee Foundation (2011)
- Academician, Chinese Academy of Engineering (2011)
- Non-official justice of the peace, Hong Kong (2012)
- Master of the World Gastroenterology Organisation Award (2013)
- World Outstanding Chinese Award, World Chinese Business Investment Foundation (2013)
- Fulbright Hong Kong Distinguished Scholar Award (2014)
- Founding Member of the Hong Kong Academy of Sciences (2015)
- First-class Award in Natural Sciences, Higher Education Outstanding Scientific Research Output Awards (Science and Technology), Ministry of Education, China (2015)

Academic offices
Preceded by Lawrence Lau	Vice-Chancellor and President of the Chinese University of Hong Kong; 2010 – 2017	Succeeded by Rocky Tuan
