= Francis Ka Leung Chan =

Hong Kong gastroenterologist

Francis Ka Leung Chan SBS, JP, FRCP, FRCPE, FRCPI, FACG, Fellow (HKCP), FHKAM (Medicine)
- 陳家亮

8th Dean of Faculty of Medicine, Chinese University of Hong Kong
- Incumbent
- Assumed office 1 February 2014
- Preceded by: Himself (interim)
- In office Interim; 1 January 2013 – 31 December 2013
- Preceded by: Tai Fai Fok
- Succeeded by: Himself

Personal details
- Born: 22 October 1964 (age 61)
- Children: 2
- Education: Chinese University of Hong Kong (MBChB, MD)
Francis Ka Leung Chan
- Other name: Chan Ka Leung
- Scientific career
- Fields: Gastroenterology
- Workplaces: Chinese University of Hong Kong
- Thesis: Hepatic bile formation in the rat model of orthotopic liver transplantation (1997)
Francis Ka Leung Chan
- Traditional Chinese: 陳家亮
- Simplified Chinese: 陈家亮
Transcriptions
Standard Mandarin
- Hanyu Pinyin: Chén Jiāliàng
Yue: Cantonese
- Yale Romanization: Chàhn Gā Leuhng
- Jyutping: Can^{4} Gaa^{1} Loeng^{6}

Francis Ka Leung Chan (Chinese: 陳家亮; Jyutping: Can4 Gaa1 Loeng6) is a Hong Kong gastroenterologist. He is the former Dean of the Faculty of Medicine, Chinese University of Hong Kong (CUHK) and the Choh-Ming Li Professor of Medicine and Therapeutics. Previously, he was the Associate Dean (Clinical) of CUHK Faculty of Medicine and the director of the Institute of Digestive Disease at CUHK.

== Early life and education ==
Chan was raised at Ngau Tau Kok, Hong Kong. He lived at Kwun Tong Garden Estate, a public housing estate, with his parents and younger brother until Form 4 (roughly equivalent to Year 10 in the English education system. Although his father graduated from a university in China, his degree did not benefit him in Hong Kong and so became a taxi driver. He completed his secondary education at St. Francis Xavier's College.

In 1983, Chan enrolled in the Faculty of Medicine of the Chinese University of Hong Kong (CUHK), which had been established only two years ago. His teachers were surprised as most students who aspired to be physicians at the time would select the older and more famous Faculty of Medicine of the University of Hong Kong. Chan cited his desire to explore new frontiers, instead of following others' path, as the reason behind his decision. He was at Chung Chi College during his undergraduate years. He graduated with an MBChB degree in 1988 as the top student in his class and with the gold medal in Surgery. Drawn by Joseph Sung's enthusiasm in teaching aspiring physicians, he joined Department of Gastroenterology at CUHK Faculty of Medicine.

Chan obtained his Doctor of Medicine (MD), which in Hong Kong is a research degree, from CUHK in 1998.

== Career ==
In 1993, Chan received a Croucher Fellowship and went to the University of Calgary in Canada to conduct research in liver transplantation in mice.

Chan joined Faculty of Medicine of the Chinese University of Hong Kong (CUHK) as a lecturer in 1997, and became a professor at the Department of Medicine and Therapeutics in 2005.

In 2010, after Joseph Sung assumed the role of Vice-Chancellor and President of CUHK, Chan took up one of Sung's previous role, the Director of the Institute of Digestive Disease. At the same time, Chan was appointed the Associate Dean (Clinical) of CUHK Faculty of Medicine.

Chan left his position of Associate Dean (Clinical) on 1 January 2013 to become the interim Dean of CUHK Faculty of Medicine. He officially took up the Deanship on 1 February 2014.

Chan's tenure as Dean ended on 31 January 2024, when Philip Wai Yan Chiu, the Associate Dean (External Affairs) of CUHK Faculty of Medicine and a professor at the Department of Surgery, will succeed him.

Concurrently, Chan is a member of the Hospital Governing Committee of Prince of Wales Hospital, a member of the Hospital Authority Board since 1 April 2013, and practices at CUHK Medical Centre, a private, non-profit hospital and teaching partner of CUHK.

As Dean of the CUHK Faculty of Medicine, Chan has been an ex-officio member of the Medical and Health Services sector of the Election Committee of Hong Kong since 2021 after the electoral changes enacted that year.

Chan co-founded biotechnology company GenieBiome in 2019. In an interview with the South China Morning Post, Chan stated that “Our initial plan was to come up with a poop company" and that there were initial challenges with dealing with venture capital funding. The company aims to make use of the human microbiome as a disease treatment.

== Research ==
Chan's research began with studying the treatment of gastric bleeding and peptic ulcers caused by Nonsteroidal anti-inflammatory ddrugs (NSAIDs). In 1997, he reported that eliminating Helicobacter pylori before administering NSAIDs reduced the incidence of NSAID-induced peptic ulcers. At the time, the research community focused on the treatment for H. pylori to prevent gastric bleeding. His research prompted a debate on the effect and benefit of H. pylori elimination before NSAID therapy.

In recent years, Chan has focused on studying human microbiome and its effect on health.

== Personal life and family ==
Chan's younger brother is Samuel Ka-yan Chan, chairman of the Competition Commission of Hong Kong.

Chan married his wife, also a physician, in 1993.

== Honours and awards ==
- Fellow of the Royal College of Physicians
- Fellow of the Royal College of Physicians of Ireland (1999)
- Fellow of the Royal College of Physicians of Edinburgh (2000)
- Fellow of the American College of Gastroenterology (2003)
- Fellow of the Royal College of Physicians (2004)
- Non-official Justice of the Peace (2010)
- International Leadership Award, American College of Gastroenterology (2018)
- Silver Bauhinia Star, Hong Kong (2019)

Academic offices
Preceded by Tai Fai Fok	Dean of Faculty of Medicine, Chinese University of Hong Kong; 2013-	Incumbent
