= Emily Ying Yang Chan =

Public health academic in Hong Kong

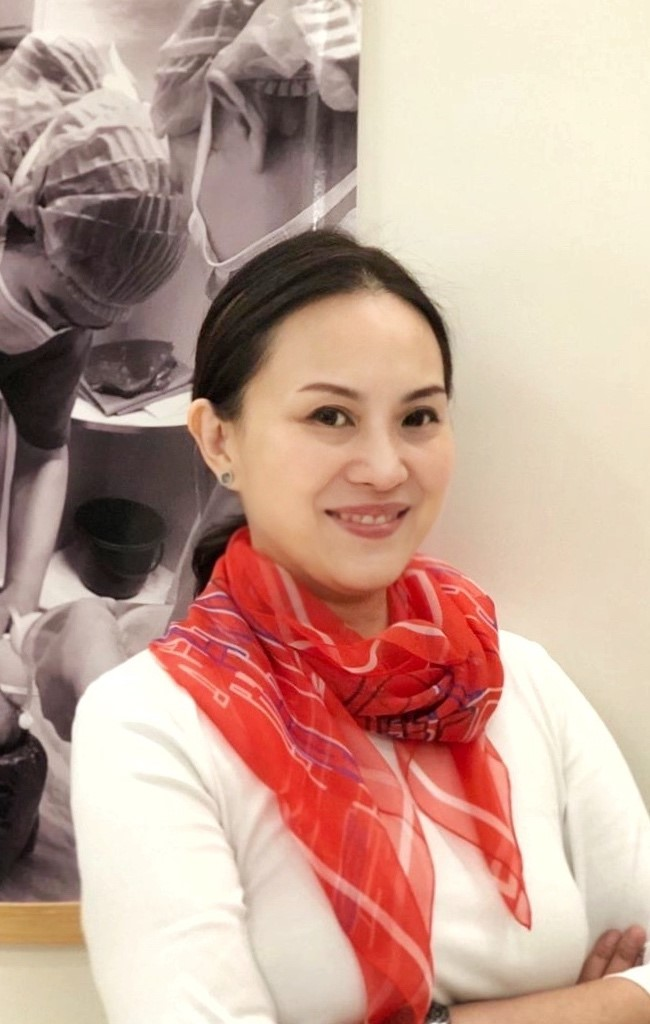
- Born: Hong Kong SAR, China
- Education: Johns Hopkins University; University of Hong Kong (HKU); The Chinese University of Hong Kong (CUHK); London School of Hygiene and Tropical Medicine; University of Hong Kong Li Ka Shing Faculty of Medicine; Harvard T.H. Chan School of Public Health; Hong Kong Academy of Medicine
- Known for: Global health and humanitarian medicine
- Scientific career
- Fields: Climate change and health, health and environmental co-benefits, disaster and humanitarian medicine, global and planetary health, violence and injury epidemiology, healthy settings, health needs and programme impact evaluation, evidence-based medical and public health interventions in resource deficit settings
- Workplaces: Chinese University of Hong Kong Faculty of Medicine; Jockey Club School of Public Health and Primary Care; Oxford University Nuffield Department of Medicine; Harvard University FXB Center for Health and Human Rights; Harvard T.H. Chan School of Public Health; Harvard University Harvard Humanitarian Initiative

Emily Ying Yang Chan, MH, is a Hong Kong clinical humanitarian doctor and academic expert in public health and humanitarian medicine. She was appointed CEO of the GX Foundation in 2019. She is concurrently Assistant Dean (External Affairs) and Professor of the Chinese University of Hong Kong Faculty of Medicine, Professor at the Jockey Club School of Public Health and Primary Care, Director at the Centre for Global Health (CGH), Director of the Collaborating Centre for Oxford University and CUHK for Disaster and Medical Humanitarian Response (CCOUC), Director of the Centre of Excellence (ICoE-CCOUC) of Integrated Research on Disaster Risk (IRDR), Visiting Professor of Public Health Medicine at the Oxford University Nuffield Department of Medicine, Fellow at Harvard University FXB Center for Health and Human Rights, Adjunct Professor at Peking University School of Public Health, Honorary Professor at University of Hong Kong Li Ka Shing Faculty of Medicine, and Fellow at Hong Kong Academy of Medicine.

== Academic and medical training ==
She received her academic training from Johns Hopkins University, Harvard T.H. Chan School of Public Health, University of Hong Kong (HKU), The Chinese University of Hong Kong (CUHK), and London School of Hygiene and Tropical Medicine.

== Research and experience ==
Her research interests include climate change and health, health and environmental co-benefits, disaster and humanitarian medicine, global and planetary health, violence and injury epidemiology, healthy settings, health needs and programme impact evaluation, evidence-based medical and public health interventions in resource deficit settings. In Research.com's Best Social Sciences and Humanities Scientists in China ranking 2022, she was ranked 55.

She has been involved in professional technical public health specialist training programmes of the Hong Kong SAR Government (2011–present), Chinese Center for Disease Control and Prevention (China CDC) (2013–2015) and the Health Emergency Response Office of China's National Health and Family Planning Commission (2013–2015). In addition, through the CCOUC China Ethnic Minority Health Project (EMHP) she established in 2009, her team has outreached more than 18,000 villagers in 49 remote, disaster-prone, resource-deficit rural settings in 11 provinces in China and trained about 700 students and scholars from CUHK, HKU, Oxford University and Harvard University. Professor Chan has also established research and training projects in Bhutan and Nepal. Moreover, the international online course "Public Health Principles in Disaster and Medical Humanitarian Response" developed by her team to examine the application of public health principles in planning and responding to disaster and humanitarian crises has more than 8,000 students enrolled from six continents since its launch in May 2014. Another 12 international online courses including "Climate Change and Health" and "Research Methodology for Disaster and Medical Humanitarian Response" developed by her team have also been launched.

Emily Chan is also co-chairperson of the World Health Organization Thematic Platform for Health Emergency & Disaster Risk Management Research Network (WHO H-EDRM Research Network), Co-chairperson of the World Health Organization COVID-19 Research Roadmap Social Science working group (2020–22), and member of the Asia Pacific Science Technology and Academia Advisory Group of the United Nations Office for Disaster Risk Reduction (UNISDR APSTAAG), World Meteorological Organization SARS-CoV-2/COVID-19 Task Team, Scientific Working Group (SWG) of World Health Organization Centre for Health Development (WHO Kobe Centre, WKC), Alliance of International Science Organizations on Disaster Risk Reduction (ANSO-DRR) International Steering Committee, and the Third China Committee for Integrated Research on Disaster Risk (IRDR China), and serves in various technical consultation capacities for World Health Organization (WHO). She has extensive experience in serving as frontline emergency relief practitioner in the mid-1990s that spans across 20 countries.

== Public services ==
- Member, Council of Hong Kong Metropolitan University (HKMU) (appointed since 20 June 2018)
- Grant Review Member, Health and Medical Research Fund, Bureau of Food and Health, HKSAR, Hong Kong (appointed since June 2013)
- Member, Corruption Prevention Advisory Committee of the Independent Commission Against Corruption (ICAC), Hong Kong SAR Government (appointed since January 2018)
- Member, Strategic Advisory Committee, Hong Kong Observatory (appointed since February 2016)
- Member, Disaster Relief Fund Advisory Committee, Hong Kong SAR Government (appointed since January 2021)
- Member, Social Welfare Advisory Committee, Labour and Welfare Bureau, Hong Kong SAR Government (appointed since 1 December 2021)
- Member, Expert Committee of the Jockey Club Museum of Climate Change (appointed since 1 February 2019)
- Council Member and Technical Advisor, Hong Kong Breast Cancer Foundation (appointed since January 2008)

== Awards and recognition ==
Emily Chan was awarded the 2007 Nobuo Maeda International Research Award of the American Public Health Association and has published more than 200 international peer-reviewed academic/technical/conference articles and seven of these appeared in The Lancet and Bulletin of the World Health Organization. Her community public health resilience and disaster-health related papers have been used as policy references within the WHO and the Health Emergency Response Office of China's National Health and Family Planning Commission. She has also received the Hong Kong Ten Outstanding Young Persons Award in 2004, Caring Physicians of the World Award in 2005, Ten Outstanding Young Persons of the World Award in 2005, Hong Kong Humanity Award in 2007, 2015 Leader of the Year Award in 2016, the National Geographic Chinese Explorer Award from the National Geographic Magazine, the 2017 UGC Teaching Award by the University Grants Committee of Hong Kong, a second prize in the 2018 National Teaching Achievement Award (High Education) from the Ministry of Education (MoE), PRC, and nominee of the biennial United Nations Sasakawa Award for Disaster Risk Reduction in 2019. Emily Chan was awarded the degree of Doctor of Science (D.Sc.) by The Chinese University of Hong Kong in 2025 in recognition of her original and distinguished contribution which adds substantially to knowledge and understanding in the field of climate change and health.

== Publication ==
- 《太阳之下无国界—香港义工医生纪行》，2007年。
- 《公共卫生与通识教育︰跨单元议题剖析》，2015年。
- 《中国农村健康及防灾培训手冊》，2015年。
- 《中国农村健康及备灾：进阶培训手册》，2016年。
- Public health humanitarian responses to natural disasters (Routledge Humanitarian Studies Series). London: Routledge; 2017.
- Building bottom-up health and disaster risk reduction programmes. Oxford: Oxford University Press; 2018.
- Climate change and urban health. London: Routledge; 2019. 288 p.
- Disaster public health and older people (Routledge Humanitarian Studies). London: Routledge; 2019. 258 p.
- Essentials for health protection: Four key components. Oxford: Oxford University Press; 2020. 256 p.
- Public health and disasters - Health Emergency and Disaster Risk Management in Asia. Tokyo: Springer; 2020.
- Health-Related Emergency Disaster Risk Management (Health-EDRM). Basel: MDPI; 2020.
- 2nd Edition of Health Emergency and Disaster Risk Management (Health-EDRM). Basel: MDPI; 2021.
- 《凝仁游访之鸡脚英雄传》，2023年。
