= Zhongda Hospital =

Hospital in Nanjing, China

The Zhongda Hospital (Chinese: 中大医院; pinyin: Zhōngdà Yīyuàn), is a Grade A tertiary hospital affiliated to the Southeast University School of Medicine in Nanjing City of China. Founded in 1935, Zhongda Hospital is now a large comprehensive hospital integrating medical treatment, education and research.

== History ==
In 1935, the National Central University Hospital was founded in Nanjing, capital of the Republic of China.

In 1949, the hospital became the Affiliated Hospital of Nanjing University.

In 1951, the hospital was renamed "Affiliated Hospital of the Medical School of the East China Military Region".

In 1953, the hospital was renamed "Affiliated Hospital of the Fifth Military Medical University".

In 1954, the hospital was renamed "PLA No. 84 Hospital".

In 1958, the hospital was renamed "Affiliated Hospital of Nanjing Railway Medical College".

In 2000, the hospital was renamed "Zhongda Hospital of Southeast University".

In 2015, a new campus was opened in Nanjing’s Jiangbei, covering an area of 26,785 square meters, with a building area of 52,712 square meters.

== Current situation ==
Zhongda Hospital is a large comprehensive hospital with 2,499 beds (including the Jiangbei Campus), with an annual outpatient and emergency volume of 1.7 million visits, and more than 80,000 patients are discharged annually.

The hospital is a Top-60 hospital (among 35,000+ hospitals in China), distinguished by its nationally top-ranked intensive care medicine, medical imaging and interventional radiology. And there are twenty provincial level key clinical specialties.

It is a National Clinical Teaching Demonstration Center and one of the first comprehensive Grade A tertiary hospitals in Jiangsu Province to pass the Ministry of Health's review.

In academic research, the hospital has published 77 papers listed in Nature Index for the Time frame of 1 April 2025 - 31 March 2026, ranking 120th globally and 48st in China in healthcare.

Zhongda Hospital is the only university hospital sponsored by the Project 985 and Project 211 in Jiangsu Province.

The hospital has international cooperation with partners in the United States, Germany, Japan, France and Singapore. It also provides services to international patients.

Hospital Address: 87 Dingjiaqiao, Nanjing, Jiangsu province, China.

== See also ==
- Southeast University School of Medicine
- List of hospitals in China
- CUHK Medical Centre
