= St. Francis Xavier's School, Tsuen Wan =

Coordinates: 22.3687°N 114.1170°E

- 荃灣聖芳濟中學
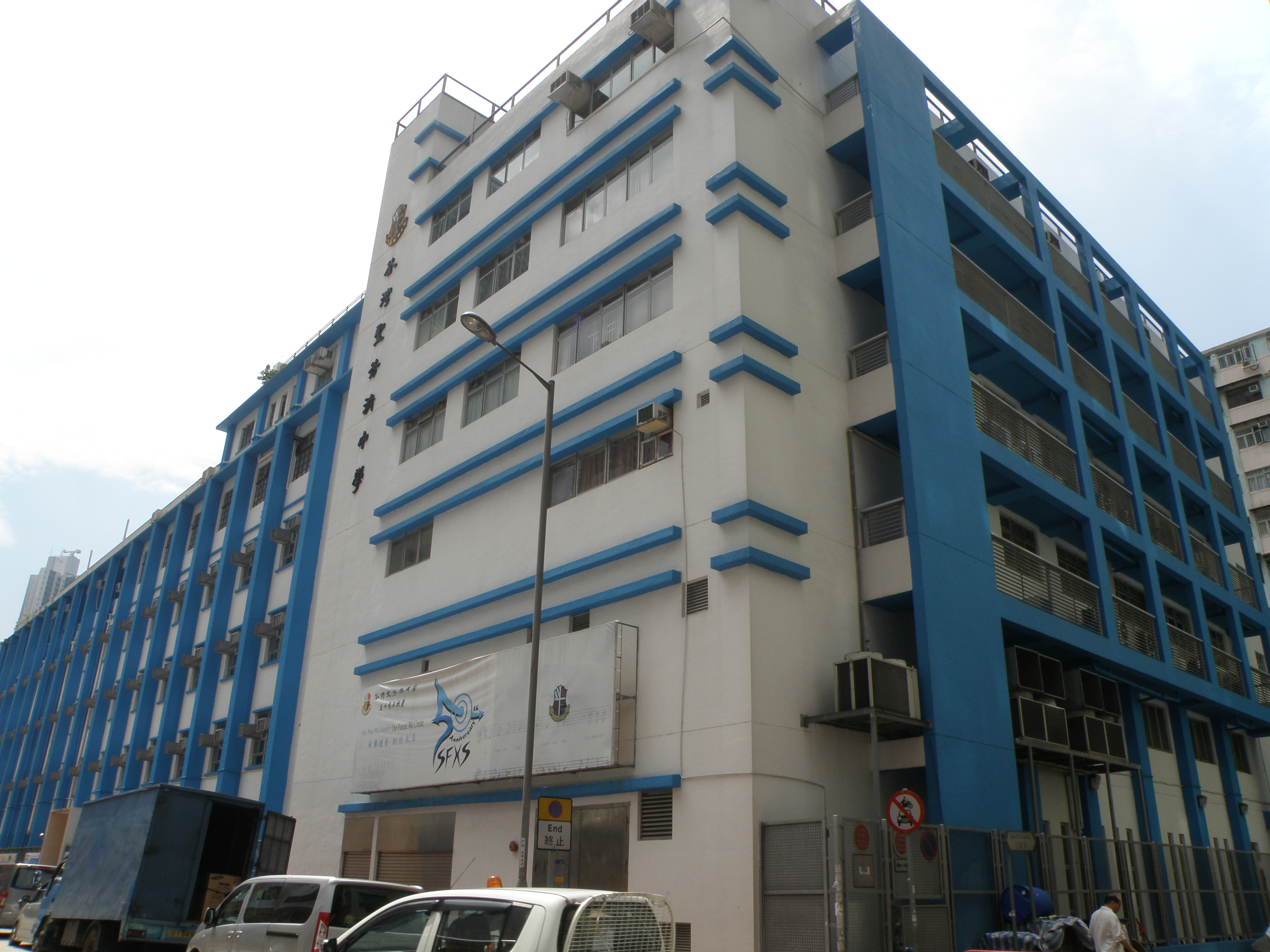

Location
- 60-64 Ham Tin Street; Tsuen Wan; Hong Kong

Information
- Type: Catholic Boys Secondary School
- Motto: Chinese: 忠誠博愛 (Integrity and Universal Love)
- Established: 25 November 1964; 61 years ago
- Founder: Rev. Bro. Bosco Wei
- Principal: Dr. Chung Chi Yuen
- Staff: 55
- Enrollment: 718
- Classes: 24
- Language: English, Chinese
- Classrooms: 25
- Website: http://www.sfxs.edu.hk/

St. Francis Xavier's School, Tsuen Wan (SFXS, TW; Chinese: 荃灣聖芳濟中學, 聖芳濟, 荃濟 or 濟記 in short) is located at 60 - 64 Ham Tin Street, Tsuen Wan, Hong Kong. The school is academically reputed and was founded in 1963. It is also the brother school of St. Francis Xavier's College, Tai Kok Tsui.

In October 2022, it suspended 14 students for "disrespectful behaviors" during the national anthem and flag-raising ceremony.

== See also ==
- St. Francis Xavier's College, Tai Kok Tsui
- Education in Hong Kong
- List of schools in Hong Kong
- List of Jesuit sites
