= The Nethersole School of Nursing =

Chinese Nursing School

The Nethersole School of Nursing, Faculty of Medicine (CUHK Nursing)
- 香港中文大學醫學院那打素護理學院 (Chinese)
- Motto: 'To serve the community with compassion’
- Type: Public
- Established: 1991
- Affiliation: CUHK Faculty of Medicine
- Director: Professor CHIEN Wai Tong
- Vice-Directors: Professor CHAIR Sek Ying; Professor CHAN YIP Wing Han, Carmen
- Location: 6-8/F, Esther Lee Building, The Chinese University of Hong Kong
- Website: https://www.nur.cuhk.edu.hk/

The Nethersole School of Nursing, also known as CUHK Nursing, is one of the five schools under the Faculty of Medicine of The Chinese University of Hong Kong (CUHK). It conducts nursing research and offers nursing education programmes at both undergraduate and postgraduate levels.

According to the QS World University Rankings – Nursing Subject 2025, CUHK Nursing holds the 1st position in both Hong Kong and Asia, and is ranked 5th globally, marking its first-ever entry into the world's top 5. Currently, it stands as the only nursing school in Asia to be placed among the top 5 nursing institutions worldwide.

== History ==
The original Nethersole School of Nursing (NSN) was the 1st hospital-based training school for nurses in Hong Kong set up in 1893 under the Alice Ho Miu Ling Nethersole Hospital.

CUHK Nursing was originally established as the Department of Nursing under the Faculty of Medicine, CUHK in 1991. It was the 1st academic department offering tertiary-level nursing education in Hong Kong.

In 2002, the department merged with the NSN, and was formally renamed 'The Nethersole School of Nursing' in appreciation of the support of the Alice Ho Miu Ling Nethersole Charity Foundation. It shared the same motto with NSN – 'to serve the community with compassion'.

== Academics ==
Currently, the School offers one undergraduate, four postgraduate, and one professional diploma nursing programmes.

Postgraduate programmes

	Established	Study Modes & Duration
Master of Philosophy-Doctor of Philosophy in Nursing	1992 (Master of Philosophy); 1996 (Doctor of Philosophy)	24 months (full-time)/ 36 months (part-time) (Master of Philosophy); 36 or 48 months (full-time)/ 48 or 64 months (part-time) 1996 (Doctor of Philosophy)
Doctor of Nursing	2009	4 years (part-time)
Master of Nursing	1995	2 years (part-time)
Master of Nursing Science (Pre-registration)	2009	3 years (full-time)

=== Undergraduate programme ===
	Established	Study Modes & Duration
Bachelor of Nursing (formerly ‘Bachelor of Nursing Bachelor of Nursing (Pre-registration))	1995	5 years (full-time)

=== Professional diploma programme ===
Programme	Established	Study Modes & Duration
Professional Diploma in Advanced Nursing Practice	2018	1 year (part-time)

== Research ==
The research work at the School is categorised into three main research themes. The professoriate staff of the School each belongs to one of these research theme groups based on their respective research focuses:

- Cancer and Palliative Care
- Cardiovascular, Metabolic and Stroke Care
- Ageing, Behavioural and Mental Wellness

== Reputation ==
Apart from the QS World University Ranking, the School was also ranked as the world's 2nd nursing institution by the 2023 Global Ranking of Academic Subjects published by the Academic Ranking of World Universities (ARWU) (ShanghaiRanking).

== See also ==
- CUHK Faculty of Medicine
- Chinese University of Hong Kong
- Alice Ho Miu Ling Nethersole Hospital
- Nursing in Hong Kong
- Nurse education
