= Collaborating Centre for Disaster and Medical Humanitarian Response =

Chinese-UK research institute

The Collaborating Centre for Oxford University and CUHK for Disaster and Medical Humanitarian Response was established jointly by the University of Oxford and The Chinese University of Hong Kong (CUHK) as a non-profit research centre to carry out research, training and community knowledge transfer in the area of disaster and medical humanitarian response in Greater China and the Asia–Pacific region. It is housed in the CUHK Faculty of Medicine and its director is Emily Ying Yang Chan as of 2016.

== History ==
CCOUC was established jointly by Oxford University and The Chinese University of Hong Kong (CUHK) in April 2011. Its founding director is Emily Ying Yang Chan.

== Mission ==
CCOUC aims to minimise the negative health impact of disasters experienced by vulnerable populations in the region by serving as a platform for research, education, and community knowledge transfer in the areas of disaster and medical humanitarian crisis policy development, planning, and response.

== Focus and activities ==
CCOUC's main initiatives include the study and promotion of population's disaster preparedness, disaster preparedness kit, bottom-up approach to disaster relief, Sendai Framework for Disaster Risk Reduction, climate change and health. CCOUC also runs an Ethnic Minority Health Project in China to study and promote disaster preparedness and public health in remote rural villages in the country's inland western provinces

The centre has participated in the World Health Organization (WHO)'s consultation meeting on disaster health risk management and established international co-operation with leading institutions in the field, including the Centre for Research on the Epidemiology of Disasters (CRED) in Belgium, and Harvard Humanitarian Initiative and FXB Center for Health and Human Rights at Harvard University.

The Secretariat for World Health Organization Thematic Platform for Health Emergency & Disaster Risk Management Research Group (WHO TPRG) has been set up at CCOUC since October 2016. CCOUC has also been recognised by Integrated Research on Disaster Risk International to lead one of its 12 International Centre of Excellence since November 2016. The centre has also been appointed Sphere Country Focal Point for China since August 2014 to promote the internationally recognised minimum standards in humanitarian response for the Geneva-based International Sphere Project.

== Partners ==
- Auxiliary Medical Service (AMS) – Hong Kong
- Centre for Research on the Epidemiology of Disasters, Université catholique de Louvain (CRED) – Belgium
- François-Xavier Bagnoud Center for Health and Human Rights, Harvard University (FXB) – United States
- Harvard Humanitarian Initiative, Harvard University (HHI) – United States
- Institute of Environment, Energy and Sustainability (IEES), CUHK
- Public Health Emergency Center at Chinese Center for Disease Control and Prevention (China CDC) – China
- Public Health England (PHE) – United Kingdom
- School of Architecture, Planning and Policy Development, Bandung Institute of Technology (ITB) – Indonesia
- Sphere Project – International
- World Green Organisation (WGO) – Hong Kong
- Yunnan Health and Development Research Association (YHDRA) – China

== See also ==
- Disaster risk reduction
- Climate change adaptation
- Emergency management
- Natural disasters
- Vulnerability
- Climate change
- Risk management
- World Health Organization
- United Nations International Strategy for Disaster Reduction
- Oxford University
- The Chinese University of Hong Kong
- CUHK Faculty of Medicine
