= Southeast University School of Medicine =

Medical school in Nanjing, China

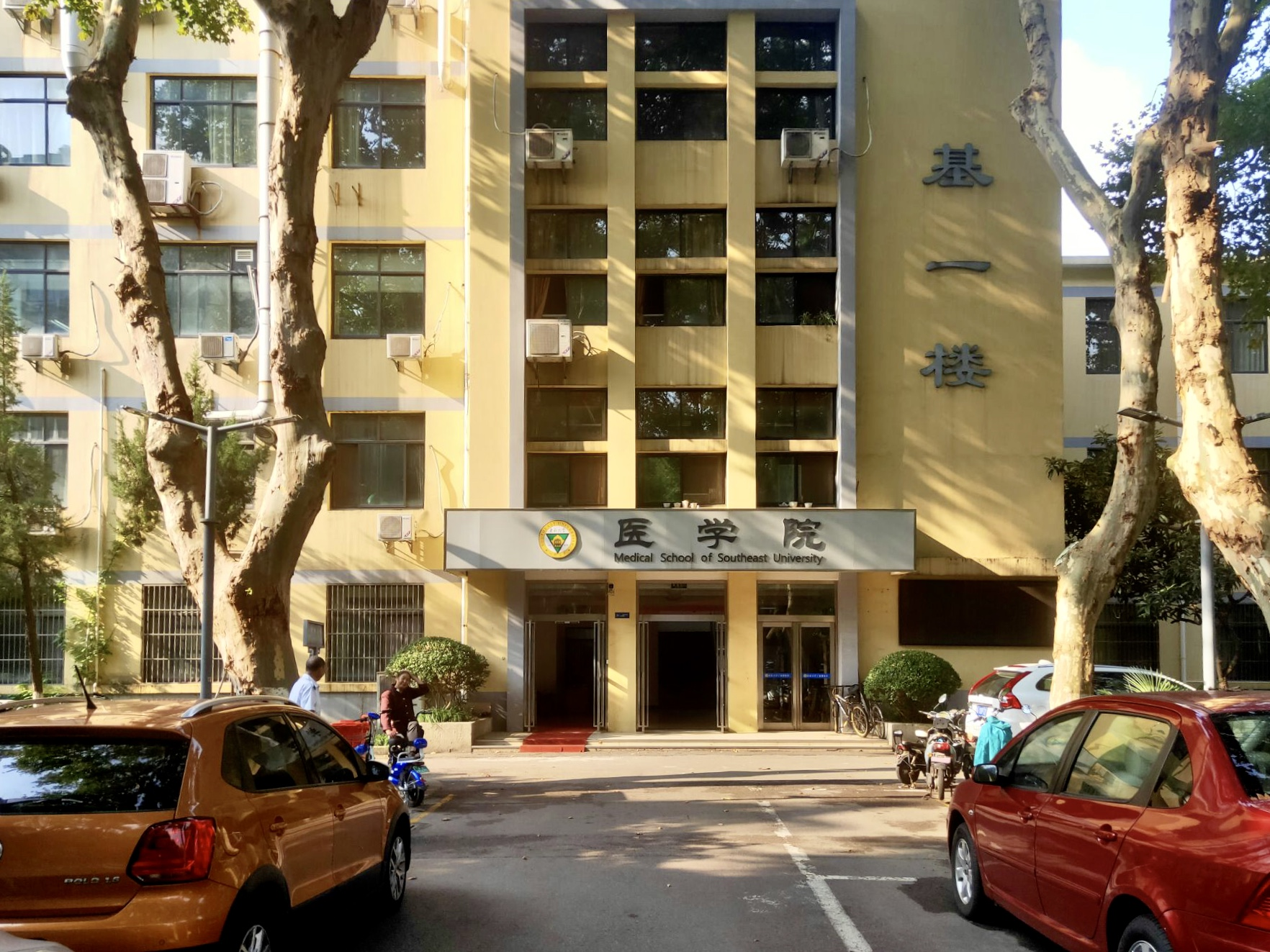
Medical School museum of Southeast University

The Southeast University School of Medicine (simplified Chinese: 东南大学医学院; traditional Chinese: 東南大學醫學院) is the medical school of the Southeast University in Nanjing, China. It is qualified in China to enroll international students in its English-taught MBBS program. Its Affiliated Zhongda Hospital is a large comprehensive teaching hospital and one of the first batch of "Grade A tertiary hospitals".

== History ==
In 1935, the medical school of National Central University was established in Nanjing, China.

In 1937， the War of Resistance against Japan broke out, and the school moved with the university to Chengdu in southwest China.

In 1946 after the War, the school moved back to Nanjing with the university.

In 1950, after the founding of the People's Republic of China, the school was renamed the "Medical School of Nanjing University".

In 1952, the school became independent and was renamed the "Medical School of the East China Military Region".

In 1953, the school was renamed the "Fifth Military Medical University".

In 1954, the Fifth Military Medical University moved to Xi'an in northwest China. Some of the remaining experts, professors, and teachers, along with three other military medical schools, jointly formed the "Sixth Military Medical School of the Chinese People's Liberation Army".

In 1958, the Sixth Military Medical School was renamed "Nanjing Railway Medical College".

In 2000, Nanjing Railway Medical College merged into Southeast University.

In 2006, the school began to admit international students for degree programs in batches, enrolling 60 international students in the MBBS Clinical Medicine program that year.

In 2009, the School of Basic Medical Sciences and the School of Clinical Medicine merged to become Southeast University School of Medicine.

In 2012, the school was selected into the national program of "Pilot Reform of the Training Model for Top-notch Innovative Medical Talents", undertaking the pilot reform of the training model for top-notch innovative medical talents and for five-year clinical medical talents.

== Current situation ==
The Southeast University School of Medicine is the medical school of the Southeast University in Nanjing, China. Its campus covers a land area of 263,000 square meters, with 193,000 square meters of building area.

The School offers bachelor's, master's, doctoral, and postdoctoral programs. It also hosts several National Clinical Teaching and Training Demonstration Centers. Southeast University is qualified in China to enroll international students in its English-taught MBBS program.

There are 19 hospitals attached to the school, among which the Affiliated Zhongda Hospital is a large comprehensive teaching hospital and one of the first batch of Grade A tertiary hospitals. The hospital has a total of 2,499 beds.

== See also ==
- Southeast University
- Ministry of Railways (China)
- List of medical schools in China
- Zhongda Hospital
