= 2017 CUHK democracy wall standoff =

Conflict at the Chinese University of Hong Kong

CUHK democracy standoff
- Part of Hong Kong–Mainland China conflict
- Date: September 2017
- Location: Hong Kong
- Methods: protests, putting up posters/banners, death threats, vandalism

Parties
Hong Kong Independence supporters/students	Anti-Hong Kong Independence forces: Mainland students; Hong Kong government; Management in Hong Kong Universities; Pro-Beijing camp; Supported by: Chinese government; Communist Youth League of China; Mainland Media	Defenders of Freedom of Speech: Student Unions in Hong Kong Universities; Hong Kong students; Pro-democracy camp; Supported by: Localist Camp

In September 2017, tensions arose between different parties over the content of posters put up on Democracy wall in the Chinese University of Hong Kong. This has led to increased tensions in Hong Kong society, due to the interpretations of freedom of speech of certain content of the posters. This has also led to copycats incidents occurring in other universities in Hong Kong as well reigniting Hong Kong Independence debate within Hong Kong Kong society. The standoff, which has manifested in a series of protests and counterprotests on campuses, is reflective of the wider disconnect between mainlanders and Hongkongers, fanned by a host of reasons from politics and language barriers to state-fuelled propaganda and competition for scarce resources.

== Background ==
=== Rise of Localism in Hong Kong ===
Since the end of 2014 Hong Kong Protests and the failure of 2014–15 Hong Kong electoral reform, led to changes to new political changes within Hong Kong society. Public dissatisfaction (among Hong Kong Youth) with Pro-democracy camp for their lack of progress in introducing democracy and the Pro-Beijing camp for not looking out for Hong Kong's interests, led to new "localist" parties being formed to challenge the status quo.

Localism has been gaining popularity within Hong Kong youth, some rejecting their identity as "Chinese", with many new political parties and organisations, with different interpretations, some Localist parties have promoted a "Hong Kong first" agenda, while others promote the notion of Hong Kong Independence, believing that only when Hong Kong is Independent from mainland China, Hong Kong can reach its true potential.

=== Student activism ===
Universities in Hong Kong have always had a strong pretense in Student activism, with involvement in many different causes as well responding to certain events and policies throughout the years, with Hong Kong Federation of Students being the main organisation. Examples include Cultural Revolution, Action Committee for Defending the Diaoyu Islands, 1989 Tiananmen Square protests and massacre, memorials for the 1989 Tiananmen Square protests and massacre, Hong Kong 1 July marches, Moral and national education protests, 2013 Hong Kong dock strike, 2014 Hong Kong protests. There has been divide between Hong Kong students and Mainland students in Hong Kong, due differences in their cultural upbringing. There are two distinct types of Mainland students, undergraduates and postgraduates. Mainland students who are undergraduates in Hong Kong universities, tend to understand the context of such problems and be bit more sympathetic in their responses as they do mingle more with Hong Kong local students. Then there are Mainland students who are one-year postgraduates, have little time to gain deep knowledge and understanding of Hong Kong and few of them will become proficient in Cantonese as most of them fresh out of university in the mainland. Hence most will be patriotic and nationalistic and most of their friend groups will be fellow Mainlanders.

=== Hong Kong-Mainland China Conflict ===
Xinqi Su, writing for South China Morning Post explains that "Tainted baby milk formula imported from the mainland, mainland mothers flooding city hospitals in a bid to give their children residency rights, tax breaks for mainland traders, the so-called “anti-locust” protests against mainland visitors, failed political reforms and, most recently, disqualification of pan-democratic lawmakers with Beijing's new interpretation of the Basic Law, have all worked to create a sense of mistrust." Both sides have poor connections/bridges between the two as well different communication. For example differences can be seen on social media, where there are “two echo chambers”, Mainland students tend to use QQ, Weibo and WeChat, while Hong Kong students tend to use Facebook and Instagram, thus deepened the segregation as well languages use, Mandarin for Mainland students and Cantonese for local students.

In an editorial, South China Morning Post explained "Pro-independence banners appeared across the city's higher education institutes on the National Day in 2016. Provocative and unwise as they are, the gestures are unsurprising, though. They stem from the negative sentiments arising from what some see as an erosion of the city's high degree of autonomy, the setback over political reform and the unlawful Occupy protests in 2014. The sentiments became even stronger after a court ruled in favour of the government's bid to throw three former student activists behind bars."

== Timeline ==
=== Week 1 ===
==== September 4 ====
A series of banners and posters displaying the messages related to "Hong Kong Independence" sprung up around the Chinese University of Hong Kong. Nobody claimed responsibility for the acts, it is believed that they put by some unknown CUHK students, the banners and posters were later taken down. As the posters were taken down, the CUHK student union condemned the act as "suppression of freedom of speech", however university argued that the banners were hung at several spots on campus without any prior permission, hence were removed.

The chair of the university's student union, Justin Au, admitted that he and other some activists had wrapped a banner, covered with the names of Pro-democracy activists jailed or facing prosecution such as Joshua Wong Chi-fung, Nathan Law Kwun-chung and Alex Chow Yong-kang, around the Goddess of Democracy statue at the campus.

==== September 5 (First standoff) ====
On Tuesday, three more 'Hong Kong Independence' banners appeared around CUHK. The university responded by accusing the CUHK student union for not enforcing rules, issuing a letter the union stating "We have noted the posters and banners advocating Hong Kong independence. Such ideas have constituted a breach of relevant provisions of the law, and go against the university's stance of absolute disagreement to independence". The union responded with encouraging students to stand up for the right to defend free speech, warning the university plans to remove the banners by force. Lee Chen-yung, vice chairperson of the Students Association, and 20 other students decided to protect the banner after being told that it was going to be removed later that day.

Later that evening, a standoff (captured on video), occurred between a Mainland female student and representatives from CUSU at Democracy wall as the student attempted to take down Independence posters (“Fight for our homeland. Fight for Hong Kong independence”). She left after being told she could post messages expressing her disagreement, she could not remove existing signage.

Similar pro-independence banners and solidarity messages for CUHK appeared in various places including the democracy wall in Hong Kong University (HKU) and Education University of Hong Kong (EdUHK). EdUHKSU reported that the banner disappeared less than an hour after being put up. It also stopped a Putonghua-speaking woman from taking down and destroying the banner, but that she had subsequently left the scene. The union issued a statement "We denounce the woman's actions. Students have the right to express their opinions, but even if they do not agree, to destroy others’ property due to a difference in political opinion is barbaric".

==== September 6 (First joint statement) ====
More pro-independence and solidarity with CUSU banners and posters has spread and appeared in City University of Hong Kong, Hong Kong Polytechnic University and Shue Yan University. Some were put up by the student unions, while others were done anonymous students. The unions from City University, Hang Seng Management College, Lingnan University, Polytechnic University, Education University, Open University and Chinese University issued a joint open letter condemning the removal of such material by campus authorities as a 'serious erosion' of academic freedom. Independence posters in Chinese University, City University, Hong Kong Polytechnic and Education University were later removed at night. The Universities of Education and City cited 'advocating illegal action' and 'violation of the Basic Law' as reasons for the removal. The four respective student unions slammed the removal as 'intervening in the students right to freedom of speech'.

==== September 7 (Second Standoff/First offensive poster about 'congratulating' death/First public protest) ====
Despite the removal of Independence posters and banners, more reappeared, with messages also appearing in Hong Kong Baptist University and the rest of universities in Hong Kong.

The mainland Chinese student captured on film on September 5 tearing down posters advocating Hong Kong independence has been called a hero by Communist Youth League. On social media, she was widely praised on mainland China, while she widely condemned in Hong Kong.

At 5pm, a group of middle-aged pro-Beijing protesters also showed up condemning the CUHK student union and urging the university management to remove all the offensive posters. At 6pm, another standoff occurred at CUHK's democracy wall between 100 Hong Kong students and Mainland students, with heated scattered quarrels broke out for completing space to put up posters and taking opposing ideological stands on freedom of speech. Posters declaring “CUSU is not CU”, “Sorry we refuse to be represented”, “Get out of Chinese soil if supporting independence”, "We don't want the anthem law" and many others appeared. The standoff lasted for an hour, before both groups dispersed. CUSU leader, Au Tsz-Ho said “We respect opposing opinions of students and will safeguard freedom of speech,” and the union agreed to clear three out of four boards of pro-independence posters, stating they would remove all such material without signatures as posters without signatures breached regulations. Shue Yan University also said posters could stay up on its democracy as long as space was also provided for other views.

An offensive post was seen on the democracy wall of the Education University of Hong Kong, after news of the death of Poon Hong-yan, a son of Undersecretary for Education Christine Choi Yuk-lin was reported.

==== September 8 (Second public protest) ====
Chinese University of Hong Kong said that it will investigate a student, who was later identified as former student union leader Ernie Chow for allegedly using derogatory language (the word “Chee-na”), after receiving multiple internal and external complaints. The incident occurred during a standoff with mainland students over banners advocating independence at Democracy wall, on September 7. The university issued a statement: “The university strongly condemns the student's use of a derogatory slur against China to engage malicious personal attacks."

At around 2.30pm, about 30 members of the student unions of Chinese University, the University of Hong Kong, Baptist University and Shue Yan University held a protest outside the Chinese University's student affairs office demanding a dialogue. They demanded protection for freedom of speech, regardless of differing political stances and a promise that banners or posters would not be taken down. At around 8.30pm, the university vice-president Dennis Ng Kee-pui agreed not to take any posters or banners down without talking to the students.

A poster "congratulating" Undersecretary for Education Christine Choi Yuk-lin on her son, Peter Poon "going to heaven" appearing on Education University, received widespread condemnation. The Education University president, Stephen Cheung Yan-leung said he was angry and upset over the posters, and two people have been captured on surveillance cameras with the university trying to identify the perpetrators. A disciplinary committee will decide the seriousness of the offense if they are students. Education University council chairman Frederick Ma Si-hang remarked “I would like to ask everyone in Hong Kong to answer one question: if they were parents, would they want their children to be educated by the two young persons?” Carrie Lam issued a statement saying “I deeply regret and condemn such behaviour. The remarks are entirely disrespectful, against the moral values of society and cold-blooded. The whole community are shocked, grieved, and enraged by the appearance of such remarks in a tertiary institution in Hong Kong.” Activists from around 40 groups demonstrated outside a library at Education University to protest over a poster that appeared to mock the death of a government official's son. The protesters demanded that university officials punish those responsible for the poster if they are found to be students there. The Education University student union leader, Lala Lai Hiu-Ching said the poster was removed soon after as insults, personal attacks and libel are forbidden on the democracy wall. The union stated “The student union will not condemn the remarks because freedom of speech and respect for others are both important.” Student union leaders from the University of Hong Kong, Baptist University, Chinese University, Shue Yan University and City University made similar remarks. Lala Lai Hiu-Ching warned of serious consequences if the university tracks down and punishes the people who put up a controversial poster, as it creates 'white terror'.

==== September 9 (Second offensive poster about 'congratulating' death) ====
Posters mocking the death of the son of Choi appeared at City University of Hong Kong's democracy wall overnight. CityU's student union took down the posters as the wordings were deemed to insulting. An offensive poster mocking the death of mainland dissent, Nobel Peace Prize winner Liu Xiaobo, and the detention of his wife appeared at the Education University of Hong Kong's Democracy wall. The latest poster, written in simplified Chinese characters, read: "Congratulate rebel Liu Xiaobo has died. Celebrate Liu Xia being under house arrest by our party forever." It was later taken down by the student union. The university's management condemned the latest incident and said CCTV footage would be reviewed and the culprits identified, and if necessary seek police help.

Rumours have surfaced that Education University students have lost their internships and potential graduate jobs due a banner "congratulating" the death of a top education official's son appearing at the campus.

==== September 10 (Second joint statement) ====
Prof. Henry Wong Nai-ching, who heads New Asia College of the Chinese University of Hong Kong and the Senate Committee on Student Discipline have launched an investigation against Ernie Chow Shue-fung, a former head of the school's student union for using offensive languages against some mainlanders during a standoff on September 7. In response, the student union accused Wong of violating the university's rules on disciplinary probes, saying that he had openly declared Chow guilty even before a trial was held, thus threatening Chow's personal safety. Ernie Chow Shue-fung said that he is very disappointed at both the college and the university, saying he was the one who suffered open humiliation and some Mainlanders at the standoff also hurled insults

CCTV footage showing two alleged suspects behind the poster against Choi and two people wearing caps and hoodie behind the poster against Liu Xiaobo were leaked to the public. A joint statement issued by the student unions of 13 tertiary education institutions accused the government of “exerting pressure on university authorities to punish those whose speech may have intimidated the people in power. Universities are where thoughts and opinions are exchanged, and democracy walls are platforms for students to speak their minds. The regime is now making an explicit effort to limit our freedom of expression,” it said. “While such slogans are inappropriate, we also find them excusable.Student unions condemn the authorities of EdU for creating white terror and request the authorities give a proper response regarding the leak of the CCTV footage.”

=== Week 2 ===
==== September 11 (Third joint statement) ====
The president of the Education University, Stephen Cheung said that even if the perpetrators behind offensive posters are found to be students at the institution, he will not report them to police, rather he will let the institution's disciplinary committee deal with them. The university has informed the Privacy Commissioner about the leakage of CCTV footage and will also look at whether better procedures can be adopted to prevent such leaks in the future.

EdU council chair Frederick Ma Si-hang responded to backlash that EDU students have been blacklisted from potential employment opportunities, stating that these were isolated incidents and that should not implicate other students, the education sector shouldn't perceive that there are problems with all students at this university and promised to communicate with the education sector. He also urged lawmakers not to pressure school authorities over the issue of Hong Kong Independence banners and posters.

Tsoi Pui- keung, a pro-independence advocate and Hong Kong National Party supporter had admitted putting up a notice at City University mocking Undersecretary for Education Christine Choi Yuk-lin after she lost her son and challenging the authorities to arrest him.

All 39 pro-Beijing Legislative Council members have submitted a joint petition to Secretary for Education Kevin Yeung Yun-hung, urging the government and university authorities to implement policies to prevent similar incidents from occurring and to issue a ban on material advocating independence. They also issued a statement saying “It is indisputable that Hong Kong independence violates the Basic Law. Opposing Hong Kong independence is the wish of the general public, and society is concerned that if this incident continues, there will be a negative effect on universities and even the whole of society.”

A group of district councillors from the Democratic Alliance for the Betterment and Progress of Hong Kong filed a report at the police headquarters in Wan Chai urging the police to enforce the law for those who put up Independence banners on university campuses.

A man was seen tearing down posters at Lingnan University of Hong Kong. The posters said that people should respect others’ freedom of speech, even if they do not support Hong Kong independence. A student took photographs of the incident and reported it to the police. The police said they are handling the case as criminal damage and no-one yet been arrested.

==== September 12 (Third public protest) ====
Several groups, including the Hong Kong Youth Against Independence, have staged protests outside the High Court and the Police Headquarters, demanding the police take action against people putting up pro-independence banners on university campuses. They said the banners are a violation of the Basic Law and the Crimes Ordinance and separatism calls have crossed the line of academic freedom and freedom of speech

The student union of Shue Yan University reported that pro-independence posters on its student noticeboard had been removed in the morning, nobody claimed responsibility.

==== September 13 (Fourth public protest) ====
Student union vice-president of Lingnan university Issac Chan Tsun-hin said anonymous posters bearing the words “Hong Kong independence” appeared on the democracy wall last week but later mysteriously removed. Posters supporting 'Hunan Independence' were seen at Lingnan's Democracy wall with the late Communist leader Mao Zedong declaring his home province in mainland China, must become an independent state.

At Hong Kong Polytechnic University, a dozen student union members staged a protest demanding an open dialogue with the management, while holding a banner stating: "The management should stop hiding and offer us an explanation. Defend our campus against dictatorial rule." They were unhappy with the removal of posters bearing the words “Hong Kong independence”, “No guilt to advocate Hong Kong independence”, and “Support Chinese University students”. PolyU management replied, saying: “To respect and observe the Basic Law, we do not support Hong Kong independence. Based on the same principle, the management of PolyU will remove all related slogans and publicity materials on campus. The removal of such items was meant to protect students from potentially breaking the law”.

==== September 14 (Third offensive poster about 'congratulating' death) ====
Tang Lipei, a Mainland student in Chinese University of Hong Kong, was accused of being a traitor and separatist by Mainland media and netizens after defending freedom of speech in Hong Kong and not praising the Mainland girl who was involved in a democracy wall standoff on September 5. He was forced to apologise publicly twice and pledge allegiance to People's Republic of China. He also contacted a lawyer over a possible lawsuit against those who called him a separatist or a treasonous person.

Pro-Beijing legislator Junius Ho announced he will organize a rally at Admiralty on September 17, to protest against independence advocacy & Professor Benny Tai as well as "cold-blooded" messages mocking the suicide of the eldest son of cation Christine Choi Yuk-lin appearing in universities. He expects around 2000 people will turn up to show their support.

A poster "celebrating" the 16th anniversary of the September 11 attacks appeared at University of Hong Kong's Democracy wall. The HKU students' union, which said it did not agree with the poster's message, but would leave it alone to respect freedom of speech.

==== September 15 (Fourth joint statement) ====
Chinese University president Joseph Sung, demanded the student union to remove materials advocating Hong Kong independence and if the student union doesn't remove the materials from areas of the campus it manages, staff officials will tear down the banners and posters. The Student union president Justin Au Tsz-hoIf responded “the school tries to remove the banners by force, we will spare no effort to protect students’ right of expression. We strongly condemn the university for refusing to communicate with students. Sung is conducting self-censorship in the school, reducing himself to a political pawn.”

In a joint statement, the ten university heads in Hong Kong stated “We treasure freedom of expression, but we condemn its recent abuses. Freedom of expression is not absolute, and like all freedoms it comes with responsibilities. All universities undersigned agree that we do not support Hong Kong independence, which contravenes the Basic Law.” Timothy O’Leary, the head of the University of Hong Kong's School of Humanities and head of concern group HKU Vigilance, questioned the statement asking “It would have been nice to know what argument they have for the banners being an ‘abuse’ of freedom of expression.”

==== September 16 (Fifth joint statement) ====
In response to the September 15th joint statement from 10 university heads, the student unions of 12 Hong Kong universities issued their own statement: “We treasure freedom of expression, which is the right that we are born with. The universities do not support Hong Kong independence, but teachers and students still enjoy the freedom of speech to discuss Hong Kong independence. All students’ unions undersigned agree that discussion on Hong Kong independence is protected under Article 27 of the Basic Law. We urge the universities to stop misleading the public.”

==== September 17 (Third Standoff/Fifth public protest) ====
Another standoff occurred at CUHK's democracy wall. Lee Man-yiu, external affairs secretary of the university's student union, confronted a few people tearing down pro-independence posters around 1.30pm, they quickly left in a car, calling Lee a "British traitor" while Lee pasted the posters back up. About an hour later, around 10 middle aged to elderly members from pro-Beijing group Caring Hong Kong Power, led by Lee Ka-Ka, returned threatened to tear down independence-themed posters. Lee called more students and security guards to maintain order. Quarrels took place between the student union members and the pro-Beijing group, with scuffles between security and Caring Hong Kong Power members as the latter put up their "This place is China" posters on the democracy wall. Police were later called by CUHK management to assist in the standoff, they arrived at 5pm, but nobody was arrested. Both groups stood off against each other with pro and anti-Independence posters still on the democracy wall, with Caring Hong Kong Power chanting "Hong Kong is China" after few hours they left.

Around 2100-4000 people turned up a protest rally in Tamar Park, organised by Junius Ho. He with other prominent Pro-Beijing figures such as Holden Chow, Tsang Shu-wo, Hau Chi-keung, Ben Chan, Peter Shiu and Chris Wat, and the protesters called HKU to fire Benny Tai, claiming he is responsible for growing calls for Hong Kong independence. During the rally, Junius Ho publicly called for killing of people who support Hong Kong Independence.

=== Week 3 ===
==== September 18 (Sixth joint statement) ====
The Lingnan University Student Union says it is ready to protect freedom of speech by assisting other universities if anyone forcefully removes Hong Kong independence banners.

The 22 pro-democracy lawmakers issued a joint statement condemning Junius Ho's remarks on September 17. “Ho, as a legislator and lawyer, expressed hate speech involving murder at a public event, crossing the bottom lines of free speech and morality and severely breaching professional conduct.” The statement also cited sections 17B and 26 of the Public Order Ordinance, which respectively criminalise causing disorder in public places and proposing violence at public gatherings, and urge the police and Department of Justice to take action. Ronny Tong also believes that Ho may broken the law citing Public Order Ordinance. Benny Tai said that publicly calling for other people's deaths had crossed the bottom line of freedom of speech. Secretary for Justice, Rimsky Yuen responded that they will look at Ho's call 'to kill' to see if it broke any law. Ho responded by saying "What is wrong with killing someone during a war?"

==== September 19 ====
Both Secretary for Education Kevin Yeung and Chief Executive Carrie Lam expressed support for the anti-independence statement jointly issued by the heads of 10 universities on September 15.

In response to Junius Ho's public remarks to 'kill', Executive Council member Regina Ip Lau Suk-yee, in criticised Julius Ho stating "Loving our country does not mean acting or speaking in a stupid way, like Junius Ho yesterday. It will do our country no good to have stupid ‘patriots’, including possibly quite a few hired to become ‘patriots.’ " Carrie Lam also criticised Junius Ho, indirectly, stating “Hong Kong is a civilised society, we have moral bottom line in a civilised society. Any rude, insulting, threatening speeches cannot be accepted. I urge society to calm down, approve what is right and condemn what is wrong – do not push Hong Kong to harm the country's sovereign safety, challenge the power of the central government, the authority of the Hong Kong Basic Law, destroy the peacefulness of society, and bring us to boundary of a civilised society.” Ho responded by claiming that “kill” has multiple meanings. The North District Parallel Imports Concern Group reported Ho's remarks to the Hong Kong Police.

At Chinese University, student union representatives were around guarding the banners from the removal threat issued on September 15. The student union also hung a new black banner bearing the words “Oppose Article 23 legislation”. At Lingnan University's Democracy wall, posters bearings the words “Support Hong Kong Independent Media” were on display, but the word “independent” later ripped off. The union vice-president Issac Chan Tsun-hin said he did not think university staff did it.

==== September 20 (Sixth public protest) ====
The Privacy Commissioner said that the Education University of Hong Kong had violated data protection principles by enabling the release of CCTV camera footage of two people suspected of putting up an offensive posters on September 10. The university was slammed for failing to take steps to safeguard unauthorized access to personal data, which is a violation of a data security principle under the city's privacy laws, however as violating a data protection principle is not a punishable offence. EdUHK students’ union president Lai Hiu-ching criticized school officials for failing to protect student rights and demanded an apology.

Security chief, John Lee, said that the police are looking into threatening comments made by pro-Beijing lawmaker Junius Ho Alex Lo, a columnist for the South China Morning Post, urged Junius Ho to issue a public apology. The Tuen Mun Community Network, has collected over 13,000 signatures demanding Ho resign from the Legislative Council and Tuen Mun District Council. Regina Ip further criticized Junius Ho by saying "Should you bite the dog that bites you? Then you also become a dog. People feel the Cultural Revolution is being revived in Hong Kong, Hongkongers dislike this most intensely." Ho responded by saying "my purpose is correct".

Around 40 protesters, including members from Demosisto, the League of Social Democrats and People Power marched from Legco to the Law Society demanding a disciplinary hearing into one of its members, Junius Ho. Prominent Pro-democracy figures Avery Ng, Tam Tak-chi, Claudia Mo, Raymond Chan Chi-chuen, Eddie Chu, Edward Yiu, Leung Kwok-hung, Tiff Yuen, Agnes Chow, and Derek Lam and protesters demanded Ho to publicly apologise and resign from his positions within the legislature, District Council and the governing board of Lingnan University. The protestors said if the authorities fail to take action against Ho for his remarks, the public will be left with the impression that the rich and powerful can get away with anything. Alan Wong Hok-ming, a member of the Progressive Lawyers Group said Ho's controversial remark has perhaps damaged the professional reputation of lawyers as a whole.

A freedom of expression concern group, has been established by CUHK students in response to the standoff involving pro-independence banners on university campuses.

==== September 21 ====
Chinese University's student union took down a controversial pro-independence banner. The union decided to take it down because people hanging the banner didn't use proper procedures for that space. But the union warned it would put up the same banner again if Chinese University failed to hold talks with teachers and students to set out clear rules regarding using the space at the Cultural Square, CUHK said it welcomed the student union's move to remove the banner and that it will continue communicating with the union on the rules regarding Cultural Square. Chinese University student union accused the university of having double standards as it had not called for banner saying ‘Oppose Article 23’ to be removed, while demanding the removal banner 'Hong Kong Independence'. It stated “Clearly the school has a double standard – everything is political censorship,” University management has become the regime's puppet – freedom of expression will be destroyed.” It accused the university of creating “white terror” by “misleading the public in saying that contravening the constitution is equal to violating criminal laws.”

A pro-Beijing group, The Defend Hong Kong Campaign staged a rally in Wan Chai supporting Junius Ho. They also filed a police report saying Ho allegedly has been bullied online. Junius Ho also reported to the police about allegedly being bullied online.

==== September 22 ====
Police confirmed they are looking into the case of Junius Ho allegedly being a victim of cyberbullying.

=== Week 4 ===
==== September 25 ====
The Hong Kong Polytechnic University admitted that it will continue to tear down pro-independence material on campus, even on the democracy wall (managed by the student union) "to prevent students from potentially violating the law." The university's management held talks with members of the student organization, Poly U Pavilion, they discussed the recent removal of material from the "democracy wall" notice board. The student union accused the university of suppressing free speech.

==== September 26 ====
In an interview with Scottish newspaper The Scotsman, University of Hong Kong vice-chancellor Professor Peter Mathieson made a clarification about the joint statement made on September 15 by 10 local universities. He stated “I have at no time said that discussion of Hong Kong independence is an abuse of freedom of expression. the first part of the joint statement was directed at specific instances of “hate speech”, one of which referred to the death of the son of Undersecretary for Education Christine Choi Yuk-lin, and another suggested the anniversary of the September 11 attacks on the World Trade Centre in New York should be celebrated. The second part of the statement restated a position that I and other universities have taken before, that as institutional leaders we do not support Hong Kong independence. Sometimes different political camps here exploit the same words or events to mean different things according to their own aims and wishes.”

== Aftermath ==
Due to recent media coverage over the standoff at Democracy Wall and removal and reappearance of independence banners and posters at Hong Kong universities, students have been posting posters commenting on a range of topics, testing the limits of freedom of speech, some resulting in harsh condemnations (see timeline above). Some of the other posters' content include: Mockery of Liu Xiaobo's death, independence for Hunan, Mao Zedong teachings on democracy and patriotism, Vladivostok reunification and celebrating the 9/11 attacks.

Albert Cheng, a political commentator, accuses the Hong Kong government of Carrie Lam and her ministers of double standards when dealing with people of different political views. He notes that they have come down hard on the democrats and independence advocates, but appear to delay or mildly or indirectly condemn pro-Beijing lawmakers and activists for their 'rogue activities'. If Lam continues with this pro-Beijing tolerance and fails to address and fix the problem in a proper manner, her governance will be doomed.

After publicly calling to 'kill' Hong Kong independence advocates, reports surfaced that Junius Ho reportedly lied about having his legal qualifications in England and Wales and Singapore, as according to the Solicitors Regulation Authority Ho's name does not exist in the authority's record. Kwok Cheuk-kin, known as 'king of judicial reviews', wants the court to disqualify him from the Legislative Council. Kwok said there might be evidence of electoral fraud by claiming he was a solicitor in Singapore, and England and Wales, when campaigning in the latest Legco election. Junius Ho later admitted using "unfortunate choice of words" during his September 17 protest rally. The Hong Kong Social Workers General Union said that they would write to The Law Society of Singapore to protest about Ho's fraudulent behaviour and would consider a penalty for his misconduct. The Neo Democrats reported Junius Ho's alleged false statements about his qualifications to the Independent Commission Against Corruption. The ICAC says they are investigating the matter. The pro-democracy camp in Legco are tabling a motion seeking to censure and impeach pro-Beijing legislator Junius Ho, over his call for the death of independence advocates, they argue that advocated killing and incites violence is already a crime and a breach of his oath of office.

Carrie Lam's popularity rating and the level of public confidence in her were at a record low since she became Chief Executive, according to the latest edition of the University of Hong Kong's public opinion programme, done from September 12 to 15. Her public confidence plunged 8 percentage points to 7 per cent compared at late August, with an approval rate of about 47 per cent and a disapproval rate of about 41 per cent. Her popularity also dropped by 2.6 marks, to 56.4 out of 100 due to the standoff.

== Impact ==
The standoff has fuelled fears that freedoms are being squeezed by Beijing, with Hong Kong students accusing their universities of suppressing freedom of speech and that Pro-Beijing camp is expanding its influence in a range of areas, from politics to media and education.

Pundits and commentators remarked that this one of Carrie Lam's first tests in dealing with a 'political affair', as she has to convince central leaders not to overreact to the independence banners, prevent large scale political stifle and assuring Hong Kong population that their freedom of speech is protected. SC Yeung writing for Eiinsight, remarks that Beijing loyalists appear to have an agenda against the pro-democracy camp and Independence advocates and are mobilizing their supporters to achieve their own political goals. The pro-Beijing camp is linking leaders of the Occupy Movement to those who support Hong Kong's breaking away from the mainland. This harms Carrie Lam's efforts to heal the divisions in society.

Sociology academic Minnie Li Ming said local and mainland students were too emotional in the recent standoff and urged Hong Kong students and residents to consider their mainland counterparts’ feelings during political campaigns, as isolating them could mean losing a large group of pro-democracy supporters.

The provocative messages banners and posters have continued to fuel tension and distrust between the city and the mainland.

Frang Cheng, writing for Ejinisight, advises "If Beijing really wants to kill talk of independence, all it has to do is to hold out hope of meaningful political reform in Hong Kong. Young people, and others, need to feel that they are masters of their own home. Once that happens, the idea of Hong Kong independence will lose attraction."

== Reaction ==
=== University officials ===
The vice-chancellor of Hong Kong Baptist University, Roland Chin stated that he would allow students to discuss Hong Kong independence on campus, as long as they don't do anything illegal or dangerous. But as long they stay within the law and will bear the consequences if they violate it.

Vice-chancellor Joseph Sung of the Chinese University said the university should not be turned into a political arena. “The idea of an independent Hong Kong is not only in breach of the Basic Law of Hong Kong but also contrary to what I personally believe. Hong Kong is an inalienable part of China; this is beyond dispute. When discussing and debating political issues, our students should always do so peacefully and rationally, and conduct the discussion or debate in a respectful and patient manner.”

Chan Chi-sum, a vice-chairman of the board of trustees of the New Asia College at Chinese University, believes students should have freedom to discuss different issues, including Hong Kong independence however putting up banners advocating it is a step too far.

Lingnan University of Hong Kong President Leonard Cheng said that discussions on Hong Kong independence will be allowed on campus, even though the university is not in support of the idea itself. The democracy wall is managed by the university's students union and the university had nothing to do with the poster being torn down.

Ho Lok Sang, the dean of business at Chu Hai College of Higher Education remarked "Challenging China's sovereignty over Hong Kong challenges the Chinese Constitution. Hong Kong enjoys privileges explicitly spelled out in the Basic Law, but is otherwise is still governed by the Chinese Constitution. Advocating Hong Kong independence will jeopardise the basic interests of its people, who desire a stable society."

Professor Johannes Chan urged the acts such as posting banners and posters, without violence, were protected within the scope of free speech and advocacy of issues including same-sex marriage and legalising euthanasia were also against the Basic Law, yet city residents were free to discuss them.

Arthur Li, The chairman of the University of Hong Kong's governing council, theorises the motivation of students supporting Hong Kong Independence: “Why do people still want Hong Kong independence? It's very simple. Our young people in the university cannot compete with our mainland students in terms of scholarships, in terms of prizes, mainland students are winning all the way. Instead of saying let's lift our game, let's compete, they are saying we don't want to play with you any more, we want to run away, we want to be independent from you. It's basically the mentality of losers.”

=== University student unions representatives ===
Lai Hiu-ching, chair of the EdUHK student union said "the democracy board on the campus should be a place where teachers and students could express their views freely. If they believe the students have broken the law, they should definitely call the police instead of removing the banners themselves."

New Asia College's students' union responded by stating the issue was not whether calls for independence should be supported, but whether its discussion should be permitted on campus and that peaceful acts such as putting up banners and posters should be allowed.

Tommy Cheung, a former student union president has called for discussions and conciliation to resolve the standoff over controversial posters and banners on university campuses.

Ryan Lee, the president of Lingnan University Students’ Union remarked “I am worried that the heads of ten universities have become political puppets.” He also said that there was a widespread consensus among students that the governing bodies of universities were being controlled by pro-Beijing appointees, hence not looking out for students' interests, but the Hong Kong government's and the Central government's.

=== Hong Kong Government ===
Chief Executive of the Hong Kong, Carrie Lam condemned the "Hong Kong independence" slogans which were displayed in Hong Kong's universities, saying such remarks had "overstepped the bottom line of society" and were in violation of the country's sovereignty, territorial integrity and development interests.

The Police commissioner Stephen Lo stated “If advocates of independence violate the laws of Hong Kong, police will take solemn and just law enforcement action for sure.”

Chief Executive Carrie Lam stated “All I want to say is that this is not a question of freedom of speech. It is a question of whether we are respecting ‘one country, two systems’, and a constitutional question of whether we care if Hong Kong can continue to have our rights and freedoms protected under ‘one country, two systems’, so that we can develop and our people can live in a stable and prosperous city. There is no question of curbing students’ freedom of speech or universities’ academic and institutional autonomy. There is no need to muddle things up. There is no room for any discussion on the independence of Hong Kong because that breaches "one country, two systems,” which underlines the prosperity and stability of Hong Kong. That violates the Basic Law, and is absolutely not in the overall interest of Hong Kong. So that position is very clear."

Matthew Cheung, Chief Secretary described the joint statement (The heads of 10 Hong Kong universities condemning the “abuses” of free speech) as explicit and correct. Freedom of speech has its limits and there is absolutely no room for discussing the city's independence and any advocacy of independence challenges national sovereignty and territorial integrity, and cannot be tolerated.

Paul Chan Mo-po, the Financial Secretary expressed hope that the people of Hong Kong would stop the wrangling, as it leads to polarization.

=== Chinese government ===
Wang Zhimin, the new director of China Liaison Office said “Across all of China's 9.6 million square kilometres of land, around the whole globe, the whole world – there is zero room for Hong Kong independence. There is zero tolerance among all Chinese nationals including the seven-odd million Hong Kong compatriots.”

=== Mainland Media ===
On September 8, the People's Daily lashed out at the student unions of Hong Kong universities for promoting the idea of Hong Kong independence.

On September 9, an editorial in China Daily, denounces the Separatists in Hong Kong for launching a campaign of “pro-independence” posters and banners across university campuses. It states that Hong Kong Independence forces are linking up with Taiwan Independence forces and encourages the SAR government and Hong Kong patriotic forces to exorcise those brainwashed youths possessed by evil forces.

On September 11, the People's Daily ran a commentary suggesting Hong Kong authorities must “take legal action” to forbid residents from advocating Hong Kong Independence. Using Germany as an example, the promotion of Nazism is illegal and considered a criminal offense, Hong Kong should do the same for Hong Kong Independence.

=== Executive Council of Hong Kong members ===
Executive Councillor Ronny Tong warned that students at the Chinese University could have broken the law by putting up banners and posters advocating Hong Kong independence, as it infringes upon on section 9 of the Crimes Ordinance that any publication is published with seditious intent then it may well be an offence. He later called the city's laws should be amended to better address calls for independence. He said “If people are simply hanging up banners or handing out leaflets about independence, without advocating for it through violence or by illegal means, then the offence of sedition shouldn't apply. However, it doesn't mean the law should have no control over the spreading of political beliefs which threaten national security.”

Executive Council convener Bernard Charnwut Chan said the government should not interfere too much in affairs on campus and these should be handled by the universities' management themselves. The bottom line is that students should not break the law. He later said the issue of Hong Kong independence should be discussed not just between students and universities, but also in the wider community. But the purpose of the discussions would not be to advocate independence, but to clarify why it just can't be done and how it is against Hong Kong's best interests.

=== Politicians ===
Maggie Chan Man-ki, a former DAB member said "promotion of independence could be considered a 'seditious intention,' which is against the Crimes Ordinance."

Civic Party leader Alan Leong Kah-kit remarked that some of the laws and provisions are set during colonial times and are not suited in modern-day context.

Ip Kin-yuen, the education sector Legislative Council member called for EdUHK to handle ‘democracy wall’ incident, because the incident will continue to snowball if some members of the public and outside organizations to continue get involved. He later called for universities to allow debates on Hong Kong independence, even if the idea is unconstitutional. Students should be allowed to discuss things that may be illegal so that they can understand why it's wrong.

Regina Ip, leader of New People's Party, theorizes that Pro-independence posters on campuses are the most radical expression of widespread disaffection in retaliation for government's successful appeal in the Court of Appeal jailing three student leaders who stormed government headquarters in September 2014. She notes that "Beijing and the Hong Kong government have much work to do to win over young people's hearts."

Democratic Alliance for the Betterment and Progress of Hong Kong lawmaker Edward Law Kwok-fun said discussing and promoting independence were two things.

Tam Yiu-chung, DAB former chairman says the pro-independence banners that recently appeared on university campuses were the work of a small group of attention-seeking students, and that most people here don't support Hong Kong independence. Those students were just looking for an excuse to oppose the central government and were wasting their energy.

=== Other organisations ===
Kevin Yam Kin-fung, founder of the Progressive Lawyers Group, argued no law was broken as the flyers and posters had merely discussed the issues and did not insinuate or encourage others to cause harm, and found it strange that CUHK is setting limits on free speech.

Alan Hoo, the chairman of the Basic Law Institute, called on the Hong Kong government to clear up ambiguity on whether such actions (displaying Hong Kong Independence banners) necessitated criminal prosecution.

Chris Yeung, a journalist and founder of Voice of Hong Kong, remarked that "The Government has stepped up acts against advocacy for pro-independence, in both deeds and words. One major initiative was to kick out pan-democrat legislators who deviated from the oath-taking ordinance when they were sworn in. Pro-independence groups were given warnings that their activities might breach the law. Schools were cautioned by the education authorities not to hold discussion on independence in classrooms. It is against the background of a hard-hit approach by the mainland and Hong Kong governments to stifle public discussion on the issue of Hong Kong independence that those posters had been put on, presumably by students. It is obvious that their acts could also be seen as a show of defiance against the authorities’ move to muzzle any talk about independence. To students, their universities campuses could perhaps be the last corner in the city where they can discuss anything freely without any restrictions. The row between students and the management of universities over the room for free debate in campuses when it comes to the issue of independence is a prelude to sharper conflicts in the months to come. The return of the issue of Hong Kong independence to public limelight has flared up fresh conflicts between mainlanders and Hongkongers. Universities have emerged as the battlefields of highly-sensitive political ideas and sharply-conflicting values. They have never been a quiet and peaceful days. But like our society, they will be getting more noisy and chaotic."

Tian Feilong, an associate professor at Beihang University's Law School in Beijing, and a director of the Chinese Association of Hong Kong and Macau Studies, reflected "The radicalisation of student unions impedes rational discussion and the blooming of a true diversity of views, thus hindering the development of democracy on campus. The Hong Kong government must shoulder its constitutional responsibility and prosecute those who flout the sedition clauses in the Crimes Ordinance, to create court precedents that would plug the loopholes in the city's national security law, before Article 23 legislation is enacted. Pro-independence students have broken the law to cause serious damage to Hong Kong and themselves as they misunderstand the legal boundaries of free speech. One logical solution is to clearly define the legal boundaries and liabilities of free speech."

Lau Ming-wai, the head of the government's Youth Commission has accused the public and the media of overreacting to the recent unfurling of Hong Kong independence banners at local universities, while calling the action both immature and frivolous. There's a need to respect freedom of speech and that right also comes with responsibilities. The recent standoff showed that young people have a weak civic and moral awareness and pro-independence banners shouldn't be encouraged.

Winnie Tam, the former chairwoman of the Hong Kong Bar Association said people who put up materials advocating Hong Kong independence on university campuses are testing the limits of their freedoms and the law. It is acceptable to discuss Hong Kong independence in an academic way, debating the pros and cons, but Pro-independence banners that appeared at various universities may have constituted seditious intent and might have violated the crimes ordinance.

Ho Hon-kuen, the chairman of Education Convergence, said that he will not defend the freedom to discuss independence because advocating independence is against Article One of the Basic Law which states that Hong Kong is an inalienable part of China.

Chi Wang, the president of the U.S. China Policy Foundation reflected “Dissatisfaction with China's government is understandable, but angrily calling for independence is not an actual solution. The most this movement can do is to grab media attention, anger Beijing and incite division. Hong Kong has maintained its unique identity even while the world around them changed. Instead of hanging signs and chanting empty slogans, the youth of Hong Kong should be learning from their city's past. They should find ways to keep their city and identity strong and unique, regardless of what flag flies from their government buildings.”

Lau Siu-kai, the vice chairman of the Chinese Association on Hong Kong and Macau Studies said to protect the institutional autonomy of local tertiary institutions, university chiefs must take steps to control the situation themselves or in future various "forces" could enter university campuses to counter calls for independence.

Hong Kong Federation of Education Workers expressed their sadness witnessing the recent standoff at the universities and vowed to stand firm on what is right in teaching Hong Kong's next generation.

Socialist Action stated it "stands firmly for the defence of the democratic rights and freedom of speech of students and all other groups. We say debating independence is a democratic right, not a crime. To resist new repressive restrictions students need to organise actively on campus – a one-day strike of university students would be the most effective response as a way to launch mass resistance to the political crackdown."

=== Other ===
University of Hong Kong principal law lecturer Eric Cheung Tat-ming remarked that some of the laws and provisions are outdated that they are not applicable in modern-day context.

Michael Chugani, a Hong Kong-based commentator and journalist reflected that "Hong Kong's politics have become so divisive that finding common ground on anything is impossible. A civilized society should know how to put politics aside when compassion is called for. Hong Kong's young should also know civilized societies have moral lines. Crossing those lines come with a cost. If there are no consequences, free speech will have no limits."

Reverend Peter Koon Ho-ming, the Anglican Church's provincial secretary general in Hong Kong, said the controversial topic of advocating Hong Kong's Independence from China should not be discussed in schools without telling students about the bloodshed it would likely unleash. Also the issue might be too sensitive at the moment for university academics to research, without being accused of advocating it.

Chris Patten, Hong Kong's last colonial governor said “They should start talking and not shouting at one another. So I very much hope the students will get into a dialogue with their vice chancellor and I hope the reverse is true as well. I made clear I was also very much against allowing the campaign for democracy to morph into a campaign for independence, which isn't going to happen, which is provocative, and which dilutes support for democracy.” He also theories that “I think the calls for independence were a consequence of not talking to people about greater democratic reform”.

== Subsequent events ==
Dozens of Lingnan University students staged a protest on September 27, calling for Junius Ho be banned from entering the institution's campus, in order to ensure people's safety. Ho is a member of the university's governing council and the students say the council should consider penalising him for the controversial comment. They also said the university should publicly condemn Ho's remark and make it clear that it doesn't share his view. Around 800 students and lecturers have submitted a petition of their demands to a university representative. The organiser of the rally, Chen Pui-hing, warned that if the institution fails properly, the protesters may organise a "campus occupation" or storm some of its buildings. On October 3, a group of 20 students staged an “occupy” campaign by camping on the campus and covered three of the university's emblems at the campus with black cloths and hung black banners bearing words blaming the management for staying silent and mocking Ho. The university responded by saying Junius Ho's comments were unrelated to Lingnan, as they were made in his own personal capacity.

At the end of September 2017, The Hong Kong Polytechnic University president Timothy Tong Wai-cheung announced he will soon retire at the end of 2018. He declined to renew his contract for another five years. He has been the president since 2008.

In October 2017, Junius Ho claims that there are one million Hong Kong residents who are Hong Kong Independence supporters as they don't have a Home Return Permit.

On October 10, Republic of China (Taiwan) flags and other celebrating posters appeared on New Asia College campus at Chinese University of Hong Kong, to celebrate Double Ten Day, however the university management removed the flags, but not other promotional posters, including the areas managed by the Student union. The Student union did not put up such materials. The union issued the following statement “The college's attitude in ignoring students is unacceptable. The flags caused no safety issues, there were also no protest slogans – the union cannot understand why the college removed them.” They demanded an apology as university did not communicate with the union beforehand and they may raise the flags again in protest.

On October 28, the student discipline committee of New Asia College punished Ernie Chow Shue-fung, the former CUHK student union president. He received a removable demerit on his record and has to perform 40 hours of college service for using foul language (“Chee-na”) against others on campus during the September 7th standoff with Mainland students at CUHK's democracy wall.

On January 18, 2018, the Pro-Beijing camp, in control of the Legislative Council, protected Junius Ho from being reprimand over his incitement to "kill without mercy" during a public rally in September 2017. Gary Chan representing the pro-Beijing camp, claims that the motion was meaningless as its outdated and silly. Ray Chan representing the Pro-democracy camp disagrees with the reasoning, and states that Gary Chan and his colleagues are diverting attention and indirectly supporting hate speech. In response to these events, Junius Ho challenged the public by saying "If you want to be my enemy, please come to Leung Tin Village, I will deal with you there"

In April 2018, the Hong Kong Police Force claimed there was "insufficient evidence" to prosecute Junius Ho over his incitement to "kill without mercy" during a public rally in September 2017.

== See also ==
- Hong Kong–Mainland China conflict
- List of higher education institutions in Hong Kong
- Hong Kong Independence
- Youth in Hong Kong
