= Sleisenger and Fordtran's Gastrointestinal and Liver Disease =

Sleisenger and Fordtran's Gastrointestinal and Liver Disease is a textbook on hepatology and gastroenterology for medical students, internists, and surgeons. First published in 1978, it has undergone many revisions to reflect the rapid advances in internal medicine and is currently in its 11th edition. It has been described as "a comprehensive and authoritative textbook of gastrointestinal diseases", the "standard bearer in gastrointestinal textbooks", and "the dominant textbook of gastroenterology".
