= CUHK Medical Centre =

CUHK Medical Centre 香港中文大學醫院
- The Chinese University of Hong Kong
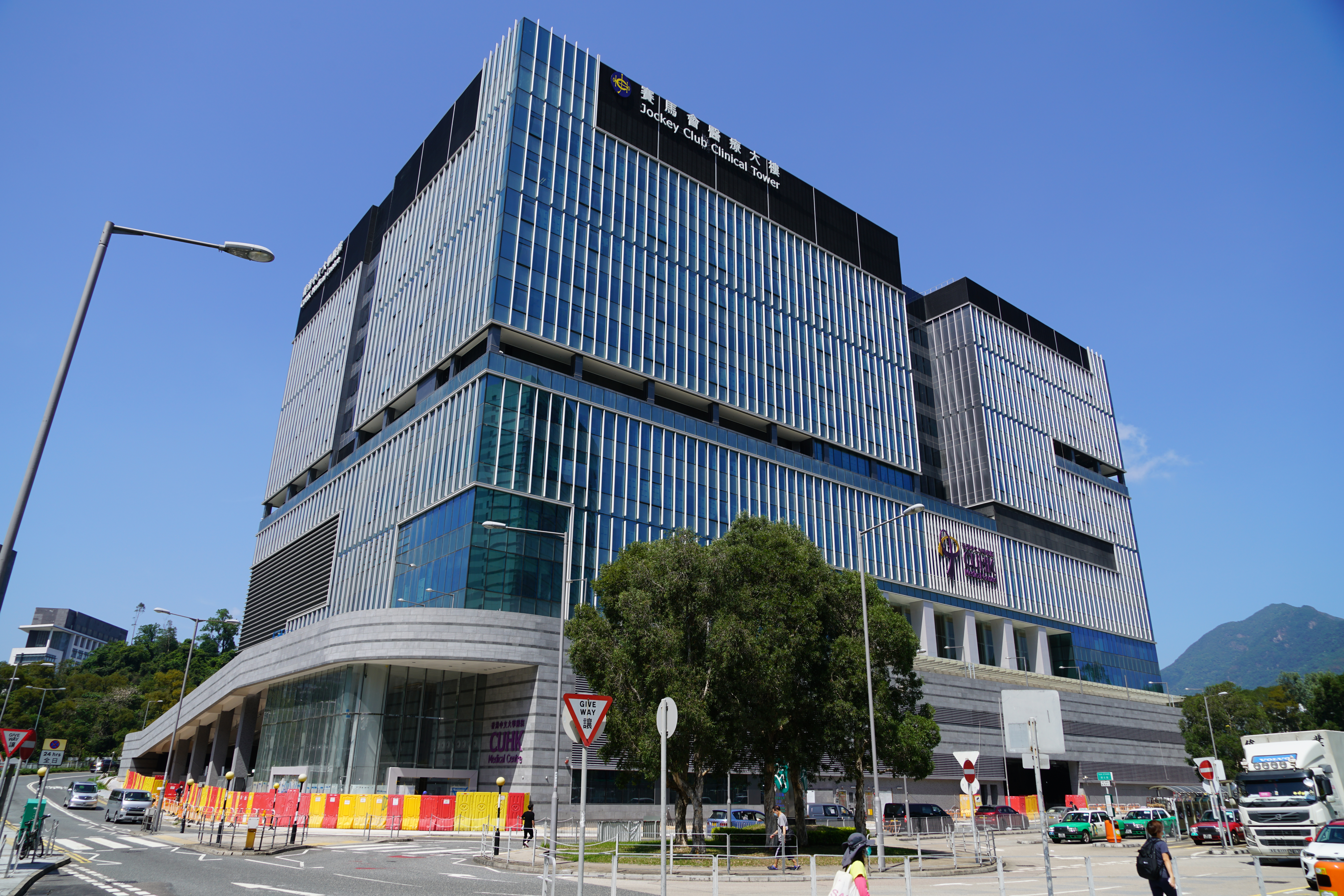
- CUHK Medical Centre

- Location in Hong Kong

Geography
- Location: 9 Chak Cheung Street, Ma Liu Shui, Sha Tin District, New Territories, Hong Kong
- Coordinates: 22°24′48″N 114°12′40″E

Organisation
- Care system: Private
- Type: District General, Teaching
- Affiliated university: Faculty of Medicine, The Chinese University of Hong Kong

Services
- Emergency department: Yes, Accident and Emergency
- Beds: 516

Helipads
- Helipad: No

History
- Founded: 6 January 2021; 5 years ago

Links
- Website: cuhkmc.hk
- Lists: Hospitals in Hong Kong

CUHK Medical Centre
- Traditional Chinese: 香港中文大學醫院
Transcriptions
Yue: Cantonese
- Yale Romanization: Hēung góng jūng mán daaih hohk yī yún
- Jyutping: Hoeng1 Gong2 Zung1 Ji1 Ji1 Jyun2

CUHK Medical Centre (Chinese: 香港中文大學醫院; CUHKMC) is a non-profit, private teaching hospital located on the campus of the Chinese University of Hong Kong (CUHK) in Ma Liu Shui, Sha Tin District, New Territories, Hong Kong. It is the first hospital in Hong Kong to be developed as a "smart hospital", integrating advanced digital technologies across patient care and hospital operations. The hospital officially commenced operations with limited services on 6 January 2021.

== History ==
=== Background ===
In his 2008 Policy Address, then Chief Executive of Hong Kong Donald Tsang announced that the Government of Hong Kong was identifying sites for the development of new private hospitals.

In December 2009, the government invited expressions of interest for hospital development on plots located in Wong Chuk Hang, Tseung Kwan O, Tai Po, and Lantau Island.

In March 2010, the Chinese University of Hong Kong submitted a non-committal expression of interest for the Tai Po site. Although the university later developed a detailed proposal, it withdrew from the tender process in 2012, citing a lack of consensus with its potential partner regarding terms of collaboration.

Subsequently, CUHK initiated plans to construct a non-profit teaching hospital on its own campus in Ma Liu Shui. A formal proposal was submitted to the government in 2014.

=== Funding ===
On 21 August 2014, the Hong Kong Jockey Club Charities Trust donated HK$1.3 billion to support the construction of the new hospital. In recognition of this contribution, one of the clinical blocks was named in honour of the Jockey Club.

The Government of Hong Kong also provided financial support in the form of a loan totalling HK$4.033 billion. The first tranche of the loan was disbursed on 20 March 2017.

=== Planning, Design and Construction ===
The site of the CUHK Medical Centre was formed in the early 1980s through land reclamation, as part of the development associated with the construction of the Tolo Highway. The site remained undeveloped for several decades. In CUHK’s 2010 campus master plan, the plot was proposed for use as an academic building and conference centre.

Preliminary architectural design was led by Australian firm BVN Architecture, in collaboration with the Architectural Design and Research Institute (AD+RG). Project management was provided by Ove Arup & Partners Hong Kong. China State Construction International served as the main contractor, with Wong & Ouyang responsible for the structural design and J. Roger Preston Limited providing electrical and mechanical (E&M) consultancy services.

Construction of the CUHK Medical Centre officially began with a groundbreaking ceremony held on 8 December 2016.

The project faced multiple delays during its development. On 18 June 2019, a fire broke out at the construction site, damaging mechanical and electrical equipment. Later that year, the 2019–2020 Hong Kong protests—including the Siege of the Chinese University of Hong Kong—disrupted access to the campus and surrounding roads. Further delays occurred in early 2020 due to supply chain disruptions caused by the global COVID-19 pandemic.

The hospital commenced operations with limited services on 6 January 2021.

== Facilities ==
The CUHK Medical Centre consists of a 14-storey hospital building with a total construction floor area of approximately 100,000 square metres (1,100,000 sq ft). The facility is organised into several interconnected tower blocks surrounding two interior courtyards.

The hospital provides three tiers of patient accommodation:

- Four-bed wards
- Double rooms
- Single rooms

CUHK Medical Centre is designed to operate as Hong Kong’s first “smart hospital”, using advanced digital technologies to improve clinical outcomes, operational efficiency, and overall service quality. The hospital’s digital strategy is based on three core components:

- Electronic Medical Record (EMR) System: A fully paperless platform managing all clinical documentation, including nursing records, diagnostic results, treatment protocols, and clinical decision-making.
- One-stop Service Platform: A digital interface enabling patients to manage appointments, registration, payments, medical record access, and communication with healthcare staff.
- Internet of Things (IoT) Applications: Technologies such as radio-frequency identification (RFID), Bluetooth, and wireless networks are used to automate workflows, reduce operational errors, and enhance communication between patients and providers.

== Services ==
The CUHK Medical Centre provides :

- Inpatient beds: 516
- Day beds: 103
- Operating theatres: 28
- Consultation rooms: 49
- Specialist medical centres: 16
- Emergency Outpatient services: 24-hour operation

Accommodation is primarily based on four-bed wards, with 84 such wards across the facility. There are also 54 double rooms and 48 single rooms to offer greater flexibility in patient privacy and affordability.

As of March 2024, CUHK Medical Centre offers all-inclusive package pricing for 763 day and inpatient procedures. The pricing model aims to improve transparency and predictability for patients.

As part of its public service commitment, CUHKMC accepts specialist outpatient and day surgery cases referred by the Hospital Authority, with patients charged at rates comparable to those at public hospitals.

=== Specialties ===
- Anaesthesiology
- Cardio-thoracic Surgery
- Cardiology
- Clinical Oncology
- Community Medicine
- Dermatology & Venereology
- Emergency Medicine
- Endocrinology, Diabetes and Metabolism
- Family Medicine
- Gastroenterology & Hepatology
- General Surgery
- Genetics and Genomics (Paediatrics)
- Geriatrics Medicine
- Gynaecological Oncology
- Haematology & Haematological Oncology
- Infectious Disease
- Intensive and Critical Care Medicine
- Medical Oncology
- Nephrology
- Neurology
- Neurosurgery
- Obstetrics and Gynaecology
- Ophthalmology
- Orthopaedics and Traumatology
- Otorhinolaryngology (ENT)
- Paediatric Haematology & Oncology
- Paediatric Respiratory Medicine
- Paediatric Surgery
- Paediatrics
- Pain Medicine
- Plastic Surgery
- Psychiatry
- Radiology
- Respiratory Medicine
- Rheumatology
- Urology

=== Medical Centres and Allied Health Services ===
- Allied Health
- Cardiology Centre
- Clinical Neuroscience Centre
- Day Surgery Centre
- Elderly Clinic
- Emergency Medicine Centre
- Endoscopy Centre
- Eye Centre
- Hemodialysis Centre
- Imaging & Interventional Radiology Centre
- Integrative Medicine Clinic
- Intensive Care Unit
- Labour and Delivery Centre
- Oncology Centre
- Paediatric Clinic
- Pain Specialist Clinic
- Radiotherapy Centre
- Specialist Outpatient Centre
- Sports Medicine & Rehabilitation Centre
- Urology Centre
- Wellness Centre
- Women Health Centre

== Transportation ==
The hospital is located next to University station on the MTR East Rail Line and is accessible via a nearby bus terminus.

== Notable people ==
- Wong Wing Yee, Clara
