= CUHK Faculty of Medicine =

Public medical faculty in Hong Kong

Coordinates: 22.4192°N 114.2088°E

Faculty of Medicine, Chinese University of Hong Kong
- 香港中文大學醫學院
- Logo of the CUHK Faculty of Medicine
- Motto: Transforming our passion into perfection
- Type: Public medical school
- Established: 1981; 45 years ago
- Parent institution: Chinese University of Hong Kong
- Affiliations: Prince of Wales Hospital; Kowloon Hospital; CUHK Medical Centre; United Christian Hospital; Queen Elizabeth Hospital
- Dean: Philip Chiu Wai-yan
- Location: Ma Liu Shui, Sha Tin, New Territories, Hong Kong
- Campus: Suburb
- Website: med.cuhk.edu.hk

CUHK Faculty of Medicine
- Traditional Chinese: 香港中文大學醫學院
- Simplified Chinese: 香港中文大学医学院
Transcriptions
Standard Mandarin
- Hanyu Pinyin: Xiānggǎng Zhōngwén Dàxué Yīxuéyuàn
Yue: Cantonese
- Jyutping: hoeng1 gong2 zung1 man4 daai6 hok6 ji1 hok6 jyun6*2

The Faculty of Medicine (branded as CU Medicine) is a faculty offering healthcare education at the Chinese University of Hong Kong, a public research university. First established in 1981 as Hong Kong's second medical school, the faculty has since expanded to consist of five schools offering undergraduate and postgraduate programmes in medicine, nursing, pharmacy, traditional Chinese medicine, biomedical sciences, and public health. The Prince of Wales Hospital is the faculty's teaching facility and base of research.

CU Medicine is one of two currently operational (Note: The city's third medical school is under development as of November 2025, and is to be run by the Hong Kong University of Science and Technology.) medical schools in Hong Kong, along with the older LKS Faculty of Medicine of the University of Hong Kong. They are also the only tertiary institutions which offer pharmacy education in the city. The faculty's medicine programme has generally been ranked within top 50 in the world by higher education analyst Quacquarelli Symonds.

== History ==
The medical school of CUHK was approved to be established in 1974 by the Hong Kong legislative council and finished its basic construction to receive its first batch of medical undergraduates in 1981. The United Christian Hospital and the Kowloon Hospital were the teaching hospitals of the school prior to the opening of the Prince of Wales Hospital in 1984.

Later on, various schools and departments were opened as well, followed by the introduction of different programmes in other fields of healthcare and biomedical sciences other than the original medical one. With the establishment of the Department of Nursing, the Bachelor of Nursing (post-registration) and Bachelor of Nursing (pre-registration) degrees were introduced in 1991 and 1995 respectively at CUHK and the Department was then renamed as "The Nethersole School of Nursing" in 2002. Moreover, the Bachelor of Pharmacy programme was launched in 1992, being Hong Kong's first educational course in that domain. This is followed by the construction of the School of Public Health 7 years later which then has been providing the city's first and sole Bachelor of Science in Public Health programme starting from 2009. The School of Chinese Medicine which originally affiliates with the University's Faculty of Science transferred to the Medical Faculty from 1 July 2013 in consideration of the School's reconfiguration and development. During the time, various important medical related discoveries were also explored by the institute.

The first full-time dean of the faculty was Gerald Hugh Choa, appointed in 1977. Since 1 February 2024, the dean has been Philip Chiu Wai-yan.

== Programmes and admission ==
CU Medicine offers eight undergraduate programmes, as of 2025:

- Bachelor of Medicine and Bachelor of Surgery (MBChB)
- Bachelor of Nursing
- Bachelor of Pharmacy
- Bachelor of Chinese Medicine
- Bachelor of Biomedical Sciences
- Bachelor of Science in Public Health
- Bachelor of Science in Gerontology
- Bachelor of Science in Community Health Practice

=== MBChB programme ===
Following the British model of medical education, CU Medicine offers its medicine programme as an undergraduate degree, which normally takes six years to complete and leads to the award of Bachelor of Medicine and Bachelor of Surgery (abbreviated as MBChB). (Note: The degree is variously abbreviated by different medical schools; the University of Hong Kong abbreviates its medical degree as MBBS.) This six-year stream has an annual intake of 300 students as of 2025.

The faculty also hosts an accelerated four-year track for university degree holders, with an initial intake of 25 students a year. It was launched in 2025 at the same time as HKU's own graduate entry programme, both of which were announced a year prior – shortly after news came out that the Hong Kong University of Science and Technology was planning to establish the city's third medical school with an emphasis on graduate entry.

== Schools and departments ==
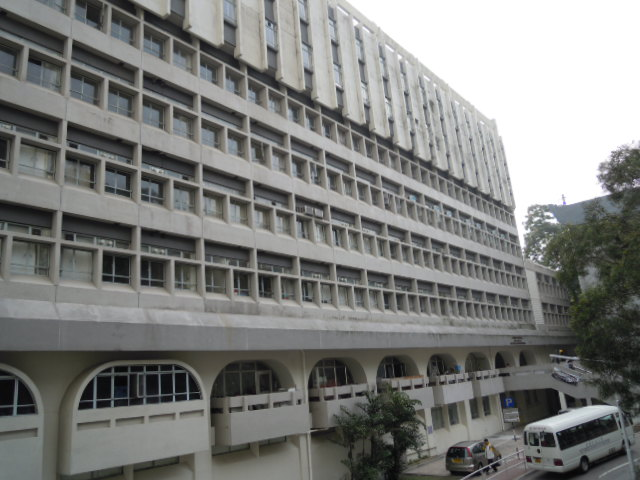
Choh-Ming Li Basic Medical Sciences Building

=== Schools ===
The CUHK Faculty of Medicine consists of five schools, as of 2024:

- School of Biomedical Sciences
- School of Chinese Medicine
- School of Pharmacy
- The Jockey Club School of Public Health and Primary Care
- The Nethersole School of Nursing

=== Departments ===
The CUHK Faculty of Medicine consists of 14 departments, as of 2024:

- Anaesthesia and Intensive Care
- Anatomical and Cellular Pathology
- Chemical Pathology
- Clinical Oncology
- Imaging and Interventional Radiology
- Medicine and Therapeutics
- Microbiology
- Obstetrics and Gynaecology
- Ophthalmology and Visual Sciences
- Orthopaedics and Traumatology
- Otorhinolaryngology, Head and Neck Surgery
- Paediatrics
- Psychiatry
- Surgery

== Affiliated hospitals ==
- Prince of Wales Hospital
- Kowloon Hospital
- United Christian Hospital
- CUHK Medical Centre

== See also ==
- The Chinese University of Hong Kong
- Li Ka Shing Faculty of Medicine, University of Hong Kong
- Medical education in Hong Kong
- Collaborating Centre for Oxford University and CUHK for Disaster and Medical Humanitarian Response
