= Rosanna Wong =

Hong Kong administrator and politician

Dame Rosanna Wong DBE JP
- 王䓪鳴

Member of the Chinese People's Political Consultative Conference
- Incumbent
- Assumed office March 2003
- Chairman: Jia Qinglin; Yu Zhengsheng; Wang Yang

Convenor of the Executive Council
- In office 26 July 1995 – 30 June 1997
- Preceded by: Lydia Dunn (as Senior Unofficial Member)
- Succeeded by: Chung Sze-yuen

Chairperson of the Housing Authority
- In office 1993 – 30 September 2000
- Preceded by: David Akers-Jones
- Succeeded by: Cheng Hon-kwan

Unofficial Member of the Executive Council
- In office 1 July 1997 – 25 June 2002
- Appointed by: Tung Chee-hwa
- In office 7 October 1992 – 30 June 1997
- Appointed by: Chris Patten
- In office 1 September 1988 – 31 October 1991
- Appointed by: David Wilson

Member of the Legislative Council
- In office 30 October 1985 – 31 July 1991
- Appointed by: Edward Youde; David Wilson

Personal details
- Born: Rosanna Wong Yick-ming; 15 August 1952 (age 74) Hong Kong
- Spouse: Alfred Tam Yat-chung (m. 1979; div. 1992)
- Children: 2
- Education: St. Stephen's Girls' College
- Alma mater: University of Hong Kong
- Occupation: Social administrator, Legislative and Executive Councillor, Chairwoman of the Housing Authority and the Education Commission

Rosanna Wong
- Traditional Chinese: 王䓪鳴
Transcriptions
Yue: Cantonese
- Yale Romanization: Wòhng Yihk-mìhng
- Jyutping: Wong^{4} Yick^{6}-ming^{4}

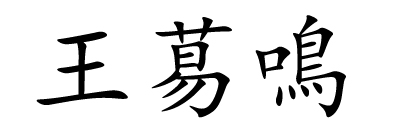
"Wong Yick-ming" (reading from left to right as shown above) in Traditional Chinese.

Dame Rosanna Wong Yick-ming DBE JP (Chinese: 王䓪鳴, born 15 August 1952) also known by her married name, Rosanna Tam Wong Yick-ming, in her former marriage from 1979 lasting until 1992, and primarily known as Dr Rosanna Wong in public occasions after 1997, is a Hong Kong social work administrator and politician who has served as the Executive Director of the Hong Kong Federation of Youth Groups since 1980.

Before the transfer of sovereignty over Hong Kong, she was appointed as unofficial member of the Legislative Council from 1985 to 1991 and of the Executive Council from 1988 to 1991. She briefly retired from politics in 1991 but was successful to return as unofficial Executive Councillor for a second time in 1992, and was also appointed chairperson of the Hong Kong Housing Authority in the following year. Wong was trusted by the last British colonial Governor of Hong Kong, Chris Patten (later Lord), who chose her to replace Baroness Dunn as the Convenor of the Executive Council (equivalent to the Senior Unofficial Member of the Executive Council) in 1995, thus rising as an influential figure in the final years of the colonial government. In 1997, she was made Dame Commander of the Order of the British Empire and became the second Chinese woman, after Baroness Dunn, to be made a Dame in history.

After the transfer of sovereignty over Hong Kong in 1997, Wong was one of the two colonial unofficial members who remained in the new Executive Council under the Government of Hong Kong Special Administrative Region. Nevertheless, when the Housing Authority Short-piling Scandal broke out in 1999, Wong, as the chairperson of the Housing Authority, was heavily blamed by the general public of not taking any responsibility. Under public pressure, she subsequently decided to resign from the Housing Authority four days before the Legislative Council passing the motion of no confidence on her and the Director of Housing, Tony Miller in June 2000. However, her resignation did not prevent her and some other government officials from receiving censure in the short-piling scandal investigation report released by the Legislative Council later in January 2003. Following the scandal, Wong ceased to be an unofficial member of the Executive Council in 2002 but was appointed chairperson of the Education Commission from 2001 to 2007. Since 2003, she has also been a Hong Kong member of the CPPCC National Committee of the People's Republic of China.

Besides, Wong plays a role in the business sector in Hong Kong. She has been a non-executive director of the Hong Kong and Shanghai Banking Corporation since 1996 and has also been an independent non-executive director of Sir Ka-shing Li's Cheung Kong Holdings since 2001.

== Biography ==
=== Early years ===
Wong was born on 15 August 1952 in Hong Kong to a family descended from Anxi County of Fujian Province in China. Her father Wong Chun Chung was an overseas Chinese from Singapore. Her mother Poon Chor Ying had been a journalist in Vietnam and in Hong Kong was a teacher at St. Stephen's Girls' College. Both had graduated from mainland China universities and were considered well-educated.

Wong is the fourth child in the family. She has three elder sisters and two younger sister and brother. She spent her early years with her family in Shatin and later moved to Kowloon. After entering secondary school, Wong's family resided on Lyttelton Road in Mid-levels on Hong Kong Island.

Wong entered St. Stephen's Girls' Primary School in 1962 and followed her sisters to enter St. Stephen's Girls' College, where their mother taught, in 1965. Wong had some classes with her mother, who also taught Regina Ip and Rita Fan, later Secretary for Security of the Hong Kong government and the President of the Legislative Council respectively. Wong once recalled that her mother's knowledge and attitude to life had deeply inspired her thinking that since secondary three, she had become a volunteer and once joined a gospel rehabilitation group for drug addicts to pay visit to the Kowloon Walled City.

In 1972, Wong graduated from the school and was soon successfully enrolled at the University of Hong Kong studying social work. At first, she was not given a room in any of the residential colleges because she lived too near to the campus. Only when she became a social secretary of St John's College Students' Association in year three of study, she had the chance to move into St John's College. In the university, Wong was something of a student activist and in 1973 joined a university visit the mainland China. All these experiences influenced her deeply and she decided to commit herself to the field of social work upon graduation.

=== Social work career ===
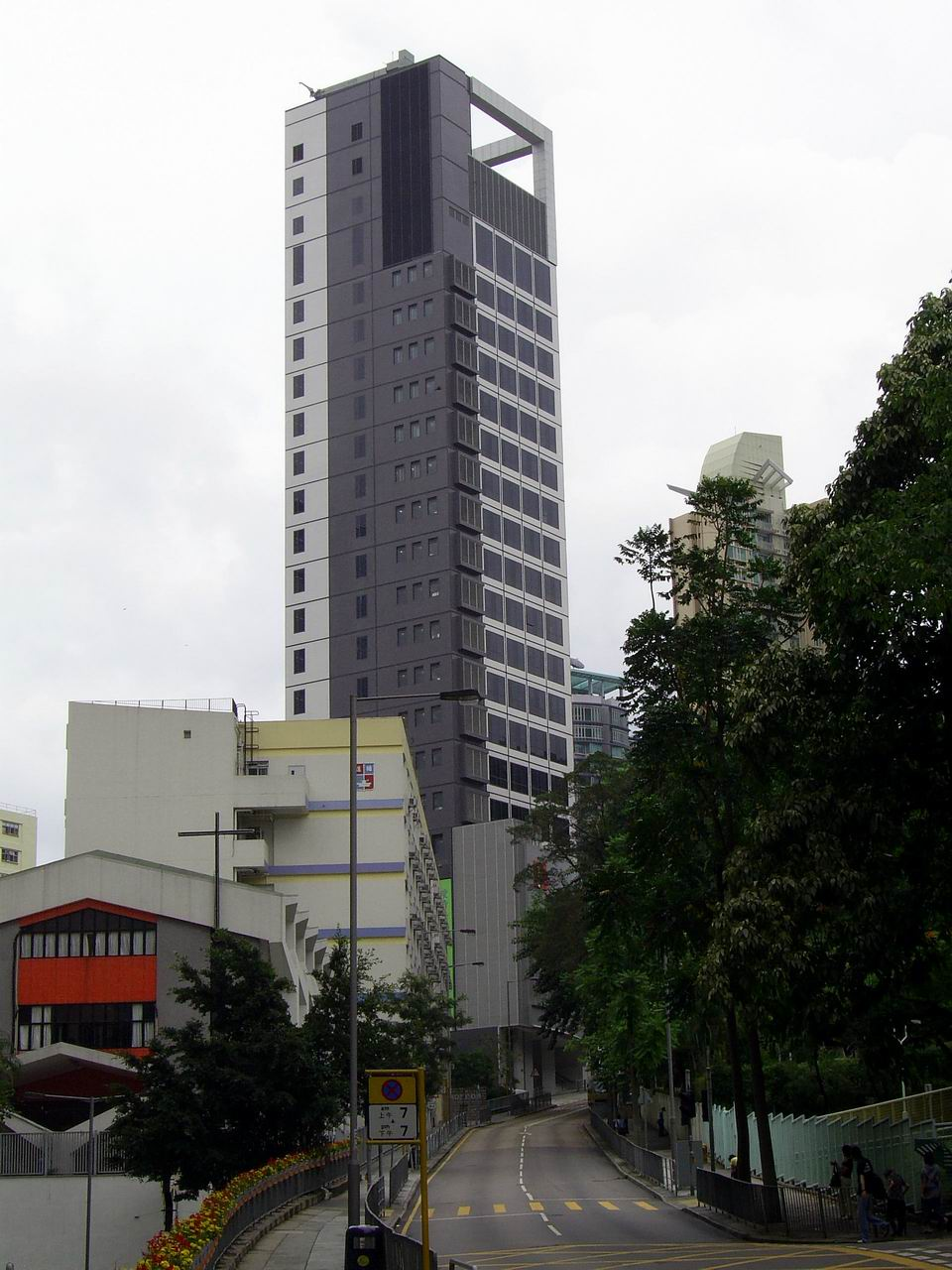
The headquarters of the Hong Kong Federation of Youth Groups in Pak Fuk Road, North Point.

Wong received her degree in social work from the University of Hong Kong in 1975 and was immediately employed by the Hong Kong Federation of Youth Groups as a social worker. She was sent to Kowloon West at first and became a supervisor responsible for affairs of teenagers and counselling services in districts including Yau Ma Tei, Sham Shui Po and Tsuen Wan. Wong later received an HSBC scholarship from 1974 to 1975, a Rotary Foundation Educational Award from 1977 to 1978 and a PEO International Peace Scholarship from 1978 to 1979. These scholarships allowed her to further study at the University of Toronto in Canada from 1977 to 1979. After obtaining a master's degree in social work from Toronto, Wong returned to the Federation of Youth Group and was immediately promoted as Executive Secretary (Operations). Later in 1980, she was further promoted as general secretary (later renamed Executive Director) at the age of 28 and thus becoming the leader of the Federation. In this capacity, she has successfully expanded the Federation to be a major teenage service organisation in Hong Kong with a total number of 800 employees.

Apart from the Federation, Wong had also involved deeply in a large number of social organisations including a number of local Christian churches. Since 1981, she had also been appointed as a member of the Executive Committee of the Hong Kong Council of Social Service and stepped down in 2005 after more than twenty years of service. From 1984 to 1988, she was appointed to the Subventions and Lotteries Fund Advisory Committee as a member by the government as well.

In 1982, she was awarded Commonwealth Scholarship, studying social policy and planning in the London School of Economics of the United Kingdom, and obtained her master degree in science in 1983. Two years later she received a diploma of executive management in a course organised jointly by the Chinese University of Hong Kong and the Hong Kong Council of Social Service. In the same year, she was awarded Hong Kong's Ten Outstanding Young Persons' Award.

=== Legislative and Executive Councillor ===
Wong's brilliance as a social administrator was soon noticed by Governor Sir Edward Youde. In 1985, Sir Edward intended to reform the Legislative Council through appointing professionals from different career sectors to the Council. Under the recommendation of Legislative Councillor, Hui Yin Fat, Wong was appointed as unofficial member of the Legislative Council at a relatively young age of 33 and thus entering politics. Other unofficial legislators newly appointed in that year included barrister-at-law Maria Tam, physician Dr Henrietta Ip Man-Hing and so on.

Since joining the Legislative Council, she had hold a large number of public duties which included court member of the University of Hong Kong, Technical College (later Polytechnic University), Baptist College (later Baptist University) and City Polytechnic (later City University), member of the Hong Kong committee for UNICEF, vice-patron of Mother's Choice, member of the government's Standing Committee on Young Offenders and so on. Besides, from 1987 to 1988 she was appointed honorary advisor to the Social Welfare Department, member of government's Law Reform Commission and Broadcasting Authority from 1987 to 1990, appointed chairwoman of the Social Welfare Advisory Committee from 1988 to 1991 and appointed the first chairwoman of the government's newly created Commission on Youth from 1990 to 1991.

Wong's work in the Legislative Council was deeply impressed by then Senior Unofficial Member of the Legislative Council Lydia Dunn (later Dame and Baroness) that under her promotion, she was further appointed as unofficial member of the government decision-making body, the Executive Council by Governor Sir David Wilson (later Lord) in 1988. On 16 January 1989 Wong was made an unofficial Justice of the Peace and later on the Queen's Birthday in 1990 she was made an Officer of the Order of the British Empire for her contribution to the general public.

However, in 1991 Wong suddenly retired from the two Councils and resigned all her public posts. She chose to further her study with her husband Dr Alfred Tam Yat-chung in the United States, trying to save their marriage from divorce. Yet their attempt was fail and they divorced eventually in 1992. Although the divorce was a terrible blow to her, she was able to continue her study while took care of her two children alone. Finally in 1993, she obtained her master's degree of arts from the University of California, Davis. A year before graduation, she was also awarded the prize of Global Leader of Tomorrow.

=== Returning to politics ===
In 1991, the Legislative Council introduced direct election for the first time in the history of Hong Kong and the election resulted in the landslide victory of the many new-born local pro-democratic political parties. To balance the power in the Council, to show friendliness to the mainland Chinese regime and to ensure that sovereignty of Hong Kong can be transferred smoothly and peacefully in 1997, many appointed or indirectly elected legislators, such as Allen Lee, Selina Chow and Rita Fan came together and formed a more conservative political group, the Co-operative Resources Centre (later renamed Liberal Party) with the support of then Governor Sir David Wilson immediately after the election. Nevertheless, Sir David was soon forced to retire in 1992 and the British policy towards China changed fundamentally. Sir David's successor, Chris Patten no longer continued his policy of gradual reform but endorsed democratic reform in full-swing. Patten believed the Co-operative Resources Centre would become a hindrance to his reform and therefore he refused to support the Centre as Sir David had done. Furthermore, he immediately reshuffled the pro-Sir David's Executive Council after becoming governor. Except the Senior Member Baroness Dunn, all other members served in Sir David's Executive Council were replaced.

Under this background of wind of change, Wong was appointed back to the Executive Council as unofficial member by Patten in 1992, a year before graduating from the University of California. After returning to Hong Kong politics, she was deeply trusted by the Governor. In 1993, she was appointed chairperson of the Hong Kong Housing Authority, overseeing the policy on the construction of public housing estates. In the same year, she was also appointed chairwoman of the Independent Police Complaints Council. In 1994, she became a member of the Court of the Hong Kong University of Science and Technology and was made a Commander of the Order of the British Empire. On the contrary, Baroness Dunn, the Senior Member of the Executive Council, was distanced by Governor Patten because she once supported the founding of the Co-operative Resources Centre, and thus her importance in the government faded gradually. Eventually in 1995, Dunn retired from the Council and chose to migrate to England. Wong then was selected to replace Dunn as the last Convenor (equivalent to the post of the Senior Unofficial Member) of the colonial Executive Council by Governor Patten.

As the Convenor of the Executive Council, Wong became an influential figure in the final years of the colonial government. Apart from being appointed non-executive director of the Hong Kong and Shanghai Banking Corporation in November 1996, she was chosen as the chairwoman of the ICAC Complaints Committee in the transitional period between 1997 and 1998. In the 1997 New Year Honours, she caught up the last chance before the transfer of sovereignty over Hong Kong that she was made a Dame Commander of the Order of the British Empire and therefore became a Dame. Wong was the second Hong Kong woman, after Baroness Dunn, to be made a substantive Dame in history, and was the last person to receive a damehood in the colonial Hong Kong. She received the damehood from Governor Chris Patten in the Government House on 19 April 1997. In the same year, Wong also received her doctorate of sociology from the University of California, Davis. She personally chose to call herself Dr. Rosanna Wong rather than Dame Rosanna Wong after 1997 in public occasions.

Since Wong had close and intimate ties with the colonial government, there had been rumours before the transfer of sovereignty that she would not be allowed to serve in the new Hong Kong Special Administrative Region's Executive Council, or even the Housing Authority. Yet, the fact was that Wong once served in the colonial Executive Council with the future Chief Executive, Tung Chee Hwa and Tung was impressed by her low-pitched image. Finally in 1997, although Tung chose veteran politician Sir Sze Yuen Chung as Convenor, Wong, along with Raymond Ch'ien Kuo Fung, was invited to stay as unofficial member in the new Executive Council. Wong continued to remain as chairperson of the Housing Authority as well.

In the early years of the Special Administrative Region, Wong was again appointed to different public posts. She has been appointed president of the Hong Kong Schools Music and Speech Association since 1997, appointed president of the English Speaking Union, Hong Kong from 1999 and has become a director of the board of the Dragon Foundation and the chairperson of the World Vision Hong Kong (香港宣明會) since 2000.

=== Short-piling scandal ===
Under the "85,000 Housing Policy" suggested by Chief Executive Tung Chee Hwa, the Housing Authority was required to build large-scale public housing estates and Home Ownership Scheme estates all over Hong Kong by the government in the early years after the transfer of sovereignty. At one time the Authority was even asked to build not less than 85,000 flats a year, so that more people could enjoy public housing. Nevertheless, because of lacking of efficient monitoring and poor planning, the policy soon became a leak for jerry-building, and a series of short-piling scandals were exposed.

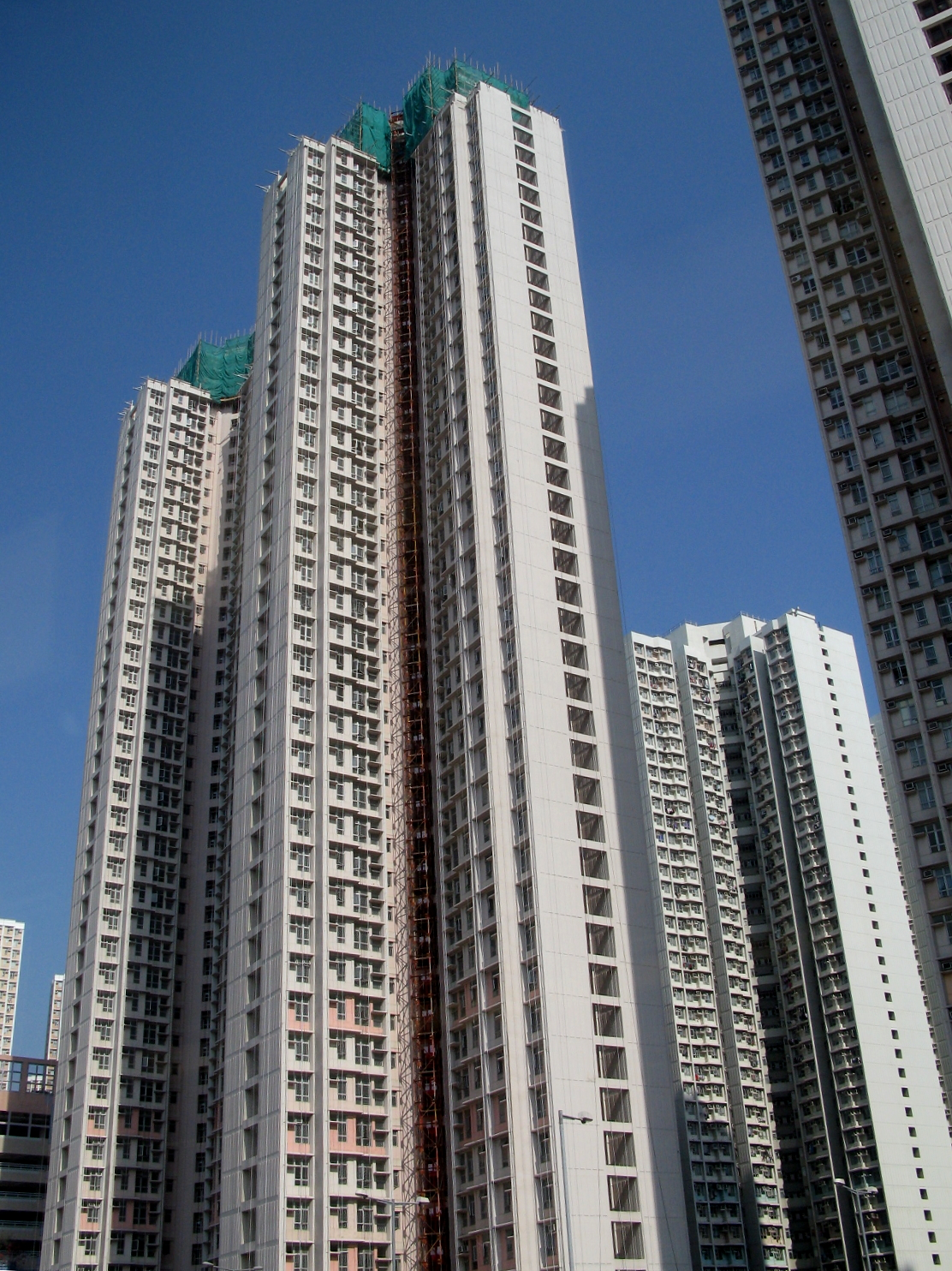
One of the "short-piling blocks" in Tin Shui Wai.

In September 1999, some blocks in Tin Chung Court, a Home Ownership Scheme estate built by the Housing Authority in Tin Shui Wai, were discovered with serious and unusual settlement. Later in January 2000, a Home Ownership Scheme construction site in Yuen Chau Kok, Sha Tin was reported to have the same problem found in Tin Chung Court, and it became known that the pilings of these affected blocks were much shorter than required. The short-piling scandals were followed by a series of discoveries of jerry-building. In March and May of the same year, constructions in the shopping centre of Shek Yam Estate and in the site of Phase 3 of Tung Chung Area 30 were reported extensive non-compliance respectively. The general public was deeply shocked by the series of scandals and the Independent Commission Against Corruption soon carried out investigations into the housing scandals.

Facing the housing scandals, as the chairperson of the Housing Authority, Wong vowed to grasp the opportunity to reform the bureaucratic and corrupted Housing Department. However, she quickly became the target to be blamed by the public opinions. Many civil groups representing residents of the public housing estates reproached Wong for being incompetent to supervise the housing constructions and they demanded her and the Director of Housing, Tony Miller to step down. In June 2000, Secretary for Housing, Dominic S. W. Wong appointed Director of Intellectual Property, Stephen R. Selby as the chairman of the Investigation Panel on Staff Discipline in the Yuen Chau Kok and Tin Chung Court Incidents to see if anyone was derelict in the whole scandal. Apart from the pressure from the government, Democratic Party's legislator Fred Li moved a motion of no confidence on both Rosanna Wong and Tony Miller in the Legislative Council on 9 June. Chief Executive Tung Chee Hwa later paid a special visit to the Legislative Council on 23 June and addressed to the Council Meeting. He hoped the legislators to vote against the motion of no confidence, claiming that if "both of them leave one after another, an administrative and legal vacuum would be created at the top level of the Government".

She declared her resignation from the Housing Authority on 24 June 2000, and became the first government official to hold accountability and resign from the government of the Special Administrative Region before the introduction of Principal Officials Accountability System. Four days later, the Legislative Council passed the motion of no confidence on her and Miller with a significant majority, however, Miller had never resigned. The post of chairperson of the Housing Authority was later filled by Dr Cheng Hon-kwan on 1 October.

The scandal did not rest with the resignation of Wong. In February 2001, the Legislative Council set up a Select committee to enquire into the whole matter in-depth. On 8 May 2001, Wong was summoned to give evidences in front of the committee. In the enquiry, she admitted the risk of jerry-building had been underestimated. Yet, she claimed that the concept of "85,000 Housing Policy" which had already existed during the governorship of Chris Patten and the Housing Authority was merely ordered to carry out the long-term housing policy which was planned by the government, not the Authority. Besides, she provided a number of letters to Governor Patten written by her between 1994 and 1996 to the enquiry. One of them, dated December 1996, stated that the Housing Authority could build only 82,000 flats a year and could not fulfill the government's intention to build 106,000 flats.

However, when Secretary for Housing, Dominic Wong gave evidences to the enquiry on 12 May, he rebutted what Wong had said. Dominic Wong explained that since 1988, it had been the Housing Authority who decided the target number of public housing flats to be built annually. The government itself had not been involved and therefore, figures forecasting the number of new public housing flats in each year's colonial Policy Address had been provided by the Housing Authority instead. He further explained that the government had only started to make their own forecast since 1997, so it was not the case suggested by Rosanna Wong that the Housing Authority had to fulfill the target number of public housing flats demanded by the government.

After two years of investigation, the Legislative Council's Select Committee released its report on the short-piling scandal in January 2003. Rosanna Wong, Dominic Wong and Tony Miller received differing degrees of censure in the report. However, the report did not recommend any punishment as it was up to the government to make the decision of whether to impose any punishment or not.

=== After-Housing Authority ===
After resigning from the Housing Authority, Wong started to fade out from Hong Kong politics and retired from the Executive Council in 2002. Besides, she succeeded Antony Leung as Chairperson of the Education Commission from 2001 to 2007. In January 2001, Wong was employed as a non-executive director to the Cheung Kong Holdings by Li Ka-shing and her employment aroused public concern. Some public opinions feared she had only stepped down from the Housing Authority for only seven months and it was inappropriate for her to be employed to a real property corporation. A few legislators also worried that Wong would no longer represent the interest of social workers by having a closer relationship with the business sector. Yet, she responded that she would only receive 5,000 HKD annually as director's emoluments from the directorship and she promised to bring the voice of the social work sector into the corporation.

Since 2003, Wong has been appointed as a Hong Kong member of the CPPCC National Committee of the People's Republic of China. There was some controversy within the pro-Beijing camp of Hong Kong over the appointment since it was the first time for Wong to be admitted to a mainland Chinese official organisation. Some criticised the fact that she had a pro-British background, while some said she had a close friendship with the former Chief Secretary, Anson Chan. However, all these criticism died out soon.

== Personal life ==
Wong married Dr. Alfred Tam Yat-chung, a paediatrician, on 15 September 1979. They had two children, Joyce (born 1981) and Jonathan (born 1985). In 1991, the couple went to study in the United States, during a difficult time in their marriage. They were divorced in 1992, after Alfred began another relationship. While married, she styled herself as Mrs. Rosanna Tam Wong Yick-ming.

== Honours ==
=== Conferments ===
- Unofficial Justice of the Peace (16 January 1989)
- Officer of the Order of the British Empire (Queen's Birthday Honours, 1990)
- Commander of the Order of the British Empire (Queen's Birthday Honours, 1994)
- Dame Commander of the Order of the British Empire (New Year Honours, 1997)

=== Honorary doctorates ===
- Doctorates of Law
  - Chinese University of Hong Kong (1996)
  - University of Toronto (1999)
- Doctorates of Social Science
  - Hong Kong Polytechnic University (2002)
  - University of Hong Kong (2003)
  - Hong Kong Institute of Education (2004)

=== Honorary memberships ===
- Hong Kong Institute of Housing (Honorary Fellow, 1994)
- Chartered Institute of Housing (Honorary Member, 1994)

== List of publications ==
- 《從政路上》. 香港：香港基督教服務處. 1992.
  - (On the Road of Politics, Hong Kong: Hong Kong Christian Service, 1992.)*
- 《也曾同路－給香港青年的書信》. 香港：香港基督教服務處. 1996.
  - (Once on the Same Road – Letters to the Teenagers of Hong Kong, Hong Kong: Hong Kong Christian Service, 1996.)*
- *Please be noted that the English translations are for reference only.

== See also ==
- Hong Kong Housing Authority
- Baroness Dunn
- Chris Patten
- Settlement (structural)
- Vote of no confidence

== Footnotes ==
Political offices
Preceded by Sir David Akers-Jones	Chairperson of the Housing Authority; 1992–2000	Succeeded by Dr Cheng Hon-kwan
Preceded by Baroness Dunn	Senior Chinese Unofficial Member of the Executive Council; 1995–1997	Office abolished
Preceded by Baroness Dunn	Senior Member of the Executive Council; 1995–1997	Succeeded by Sir Sze Yuen Chung as Convenor of the Executive Council
Preceded by Anthony Leung	Chairperson of the Education Commission; 2001–2007	Succeeded by Dr Alice K. Y. Lam
