= Handover of Hong Kong =

1997 return of Hong Kong from the UK to China

- Part of the decolonisation of Asia
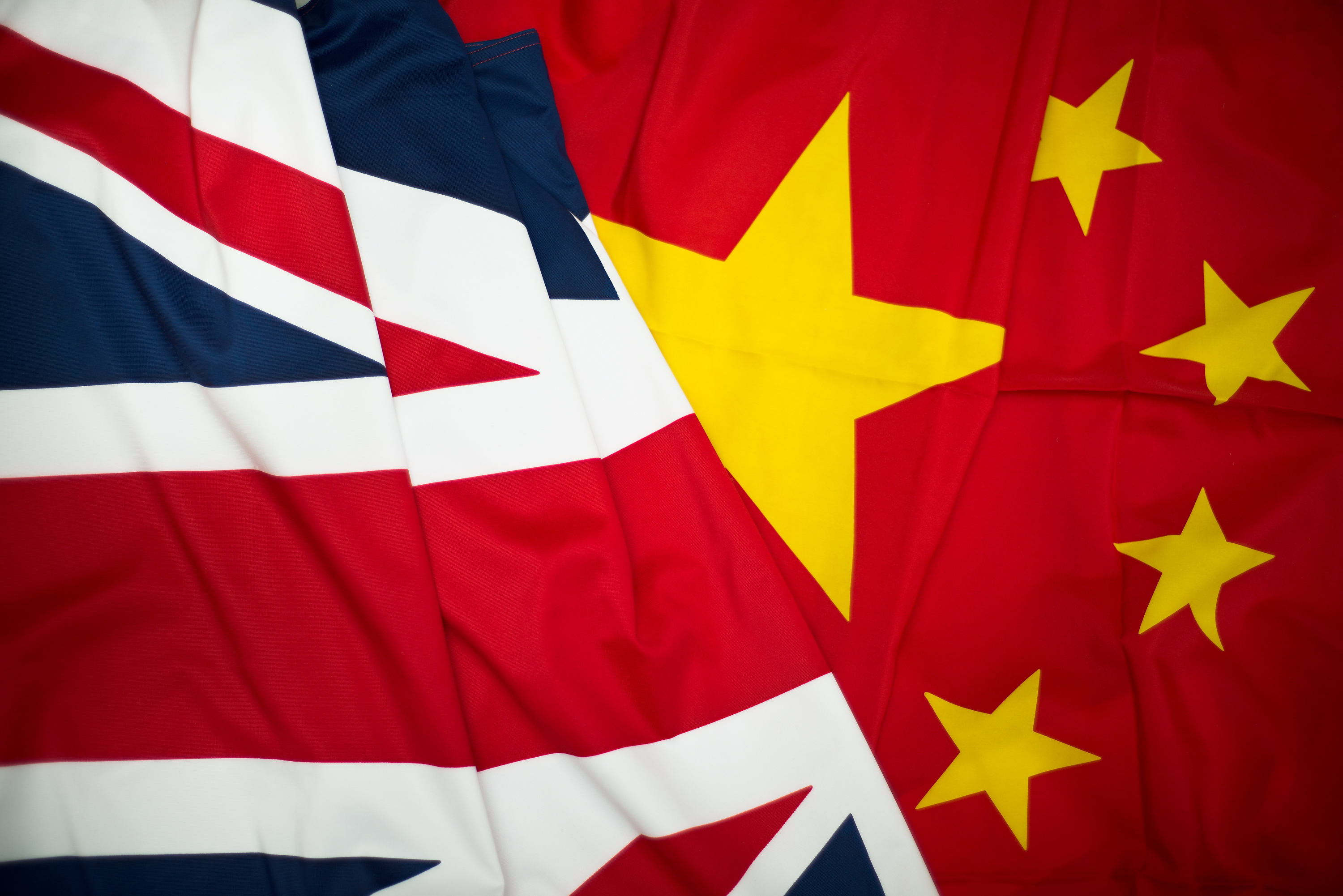
- Date: 1 July 1997; 29 years ago
- Time: 00:00 (HKT, UTC+08:00)
- Location: Hong Kong
- Also known as: Transfer of Sovereignty over Hong Kong
- Participants: China; Jiang Zemin; Li Peng; Tung Chee-hwa; United Kingdom; Charles, Prince of Wales; Tony Blair; Chris Patten

Handover of Hong Kong

Return of Hong Kong
- Traditional Chinese: 香港回歸
- Simplified Chinese: 香港回归
Transcriptions
Standard Mandarin
- Hanyu Pinyin: Xiānggǎng Huíguī
Yue: Cantonese
- Yale Romanization: Hēung góng wùih gwāi
- Jyutping: Hoeng1 gong2 wui4 gwai1

Transfer of sovereignty over Hong Kong
- Traditional Chinese: 香港主權移交
- Simplified Chinese: 香港主权移交
Transcriptions
Standard Mandarin
- Hanyu Pinyin: Xiānggǎng Zhǔquán Yíjiāo
Yue: Cantonese
- Yale Romanization: Hēung góng jyú kyùhn yìh gāau
- Jyutping: Hoeng1 gong2 zyu2 kyun4 ji4 gaau1

The handover of Hong Kong from the United Kingdom of Great Britain and Northern Ireland to the People's Republic of China occurred at midnight on 1 July 1997. This event ended 156 years of British rule, dating back to the capture of Hong Kong Island in 1841 during the First Opium War.

Hong Kong was a colony within the British Empire from 1841, except during the Japanese occupation of Hong Kong from 1941 to 1945. Its territory expanded after the First Opium War with the addition of the Kowloon Peninsula and Stonecutters Island in 1860 and the New Territories in 1898 under a 99-year lease. The 1984 Sino–British Joint Declaration set the terms of the 1997 handover, under which China pledged to uphold "one country, two systems" for 50 years. Hong Kong became China's first special administrative region, followed by Macau in 1999 under similar arrangements. With a population of about 6.5 million in 1997, Hong Kong made up 97 percent of the population of all the British Dependent Territories and was Britain's last major colony.

The transfer, which was marked by a handover ceremony attended by Charles III (then as Prince of Wales) and broadcast around the world, is often considered to mark the definitive end of the British Empire. Influence from the Chinese Communist Party (CCP)-led central government in Hong Kong expanded significantly during the late 2010s and 2020s, roughly two decades after the handover. The 2019–2020 Hong Kong protests prompted the introduction of the 2020 Hong Kong national security law and the 2021 Hong Kong electoral changes. These measures drew criticism from the British government, which declared that China was in a "state of ongoing non-compliance" with the Joint Declaration. Hong Kong is now widely regarded as being under tight control of the Chinese government, with its autonomy largely symbolic.

== Nomenclature ==
Following the end of the Second World War, both the Kuomintang and the Chinese Communist Party (CCP) proposed "(China) to recover Hong Kong" (Chinese: 中國收回香港, Yue Chinese: 中國收返香港), which had since been the common descriptive statement in mainland China, Hong Kong and Taiwan until the mid-1990s. "Reunification of Hong Kong" (Chinese: 香港回歸) was used by a minority of pro-Beijing politicians, lawyers and newspapers during Sino-British negotiations in 1983 and 1984, and gradually became mainstream in Hong Kong by early 1997 at the latest. A similar phrase "return of Hong Kong to the motherland" (Chinese: 香港回歸祖國) is also often used by Hong Kong and Chinese officials. Nevertheless, "Handover of Hong Kong" is still mainly used in the English-speaking world.

"Transfer of sovereignty over Hong Kong" (Chinese: 香港主權移交) is another description frequently used by Hong Kong officials and the media, as well as non-locals and academics, which is not recognized by the Chinese Government. Beijing claims neither the Qing dynasty exercised sovereignty over Hong Kong after ceding it, nor the British therefore did, and hence the transfer of sovereignty to China from Britain is not logically possible. As no consensus was reached on the sovereignty transfer, the Chinese stated "to recover the Hong Kong area" (Chinese: 收回香港地區) and "to resume the exercise of sovereignty over Hong Kong" (Chinese: 對香港恢復行使主權) in the Sino-British Joint Declaration, while the British declared "(to) restore Hong Kong to the People's Republic of China" (Chinese: 將香港交還給中華人民共和國).

== Background ==
Britain acquired Hong Kong Island in 1842, the Kowloon Peninsula in 1860, and the lease of the New Territories in 1898.

By the 1820s and 1830s, the British had conquered parts of India and had intentions of growing cotton in these lands to offset the amount of cotton they were buying from America. When this endeavour failed, the British realised they could grow poppies at an incredible rate. These poppies could then be turned into opium, which the Chinese highly desired, but their laws prohibited. So the British plan was to grow poppies in India, convert it into opium, smuggle the opium into China and trade it for tea, and sell the tea back in Britain. The illegal opium trade was highly successful, and the drug was very profitably smuggled into China in extremely large volumes.

The United Kingdom obtained control over portions of Hong Kong's territory through three treaties concluded with Qing China after the Opium Wars:

- 1842 Treaty of Nanking: Hong Kong Island ceded in perpetuity
- 1860 Convention of Peking: Kowloon Peninsula and Stonecutter's Island additionally ceded
- 1898 Convention for the Extension of Hong Kong Territory: the New Territories and outlying islands leased for 99 years until 1997

Despite the finite nature of the New Territories lease, this portion of the colony was developed just as rapidly as, and became highly integrated with, the rest of Hong Kong. As the end of the lease approached, and by the time of serious negotiations over the future status of Hong Kong in the 1980s, it was thought impractical to separate the ceded territories and return only the New Territories to China. In addition, with the scarcity of land and natural resources in Hong Kong Island and Kowloon, large-scale infrastructure investments had been made in the New Territories, with break-evens lying well past 30 June 1997.

When the People's Republic of China obtained its seat in the United Nations as a result of the UN General Assembly Resolution 2758 in 1971, it began to act diplomatically on its previously lost sovereignty over both Hong Kong and Macau. In March 1972, the Chinese UN representative, Huang Hua, wrote to the United Nations Decolonization Committee to state the position of the Chinese government:

The questions of Hong Kong and Macau belong to the category of questions resulting from the series of unequal treaties which the imperialists imposed on China. Hong Kong and Macau are part of Chinese territory occupied by the British and Portuguese authorities. The settlement of the questions of Hong Kong and Macau is entirely within China's sovereign right and do not at all fall under the ordinary category of colonial territories. Consequently, they should not be included in the list of colonial territories covered by the declaration on the granting of independence to colonial territories and people. With regard to the questions of Hong Kong and Macau, the Chinese government has consistently held that they should be settled in an appropriate way when conditions are ripe.

The same year, on 8 November, the United Nations General Assembly passed the resolution on removing Hong Kong and Macau from the official list of colonies.

In March 1979 the Governor of Hong Kong, Murray MacLehose, paid his first official visit to the People's Republic of China (PRC), taking the initiative to raise the question of Hong Kong's sovereignty with CCP vice chairman Deng Xiaoping. Without clarifying and establishing the official position of the PRC government, the arranging of real estate leases and loans agreements in Hong Kong within the next 18 years would become difficult.

In response to concerns over land leases in the New Territories, MacLehose proposed that British administration of the whole of Hong Kong, as opposed to sovereignty, be allowed to continue after 1997. He also proposed that contracts include the phrase "for so long as the Crown administers the territory".

In fact, as early as the mid-1970s, Hong Kong had faced additional risks raising loans for large-scale infrastructure projects such as its Mass Transit Railway (MTR) system and a new airport. Caught unprepared, Deng asserted the necessity of Hong Kong's return to China, upon which Hong Kong would be given special status by the PRC government.

MacLehose's visit to the PRC raised the curtain on the issue of Hong Kong's sovereignty: Britain was made aware of the PRC's intent to resume sovereignty over Hong Kong, and began to make arrangements accordingly to ensure the sustenance of her interests within the territory, as well as initiating the creation of a withdrawal plan in case of emergency.

Three years later, Deng received the former British Prime Minister Edward Heath, who had been dispatched as the special envoy of Prime Minister Margaret Thatcher to establish an understanding of the PRC's plans with regards to the retrocession of Hong Kong; during their meeting, Deng outlined his plans to make the territory a special economic zone, which would retain its capitalist system under Chinese sovereignty.

In the same year, Edward Youde, who succeeded MacLehose as the 26th Governor of Hong Kong, led a delegation of five Executive Councillors to London, including Chung Sze-yuen, Lydia Dunn, and Roger Lobo. Chung presented their position on the sovereignty of Hong Kong to Thatcher, encouraging her to take into consideration the interests of the native Hong Kong population in her upcoming visit to China.

In light of the increasing openness of the PRC government and economic reforms on the mainland, the then British Prime Minister Margaret Thatcher sought the PRC's agreement to a continued British presence in the territory.

However, the PRC took a contrary position: not only did the PRC wish for the New Territories, on lease until 1997, to be placed under the PRC's jurisdiction, it also refused to recognise the onerous unequal treaties under which Hong Kong Island and Kowloon had been ceded to Britain in perpetuity after the Opium Wars. Consequently, the PRC recognised only the British administration in Hong Kong, but not British sovereignty.

== Talks ==
Major events, 1979–1997

- 24 March 1979: Hong Kong Governor Murray MacLehose was invited to visit Guangzhou and Beijing to find out the attitude of the Chinese government on the issue of Hong Kong.
- 29 March 1979: Murray MacLehose met Chinese Vice Premier Deng Xiaoping and raised the issue of Hong Kong for the first time. Deng remarked that the investors could set their minds at peace.
- 4 April 1979: The Kowloon–Canton through-train routes were restored after 30 years of non-service.
- 3 May 1979: The Conservative Party won the UK election.
- 29 October 1979: CCP Chairman and Chinese Premier Hua Guofeng visited Britain and had a meeting with British prime minister Margaret Thatcher. Both of them expressed their concern to maintain the stability and prosperity of Hong Kong.
- 12 May 1980: Although Tabled by the Conservative Party in the British government, a new status "British Overseas Territories citizen" was introduced. This status proposal was widely opposed by Hong Kong people.
- 3 April 1981: Foreign Secretary Lord Carrington met Deng Xiaoping in his visit to Beijing.
- 30 September 1981: Chairman of the NPC Ye Jianying issued nine guiding principles concerning a peaceful reunification of Taiwan and mainland China.
- 30 October 1981: The House of Commons passed the new British Nationality Act.
- November 1981: The Beijing government invited some Hong Kong citizens to help organising a united front in the handling of the Hong Kong issue.
- 6 January 1982: Chinese Premier Zhao Ziyang met with Lord Privy Seal Humphrey Atkins. Zhao insisted that the PRC would uphold its sovereignty over Hong Kong.
- 10 March 1982: Vice Premier Gu Mu met with John Bremridge, promising to maintain Hong Kong's stability and prosperity.
- 6 April 1982: Deng Xiaoping revealed his wish to have official contact with the British government.
- 8 May 1982: Edward Youde arrived as the 26th Governor of Hong Kong.
- May 1982: Deng Xiaoping and Zhao Ziyang collected advice from Hong Kong notables such as Li Ka-shing and Ann Tse-kei.
- 15 June 1982: Deng Xiaoping officially announced the position of the Chinese government in the context of the Hong Kong 97 Issue, marking the first public statement on part of the PRC with regards to the issue.

=== Before the negotiations ===
In the wake of Governor MacLehose's visit, Britain and the PRC established initial diplomatic contact for further discussions of the Hong Kong Question, paving the way for Thatcher's first visit to the PRC in September 1982.

Margaret Thatcher, in discussion with Deng Xiaoping, reiterated the validity of an extension of the lease of Hong Kong territory, particularly in light of binding treaties, including the Treaty of Nanking in 1842, the Convention of Peking in 1856, and the Convention for the Extension of Hong Kong Territory signed in 1890.

In response, Deng Xiaoping cited the lack of room for compromise on the question of sovereignty over Hong Kong; the PRC, as the successor of Qing dynasty and the Republic of China on the mainland, would recover the entirety of the New Territories, Kowloon and Hong Kong Island. China considered treaties about Hong Kong as unequal and ultimately refused to accept any outcome that would indicate permanent loss of sovereignty over Hong Kong's area, whatever wording the former treaties had.

During talks with Thatcher, China planned to seize Hong Kong if the negotiations set off unrest in the colony. Thatcher later said that Deng told her bluntly that China could easily take Hong Kong by force, stating that "I could walk in and take the whole lot this afternoon", to which she replied that "there is nothing I could do to stop you, but the eyes of the world would now know what China is like".

After her visit with Deng in Beijing, Thatcher was received in Hong Kong as the first British Prime Minister to set foot on the territory whilst in office. At a press conference, Thatcher re-emphasised the validity of the three treaties, asserting the need for countries to respect treaties on universal terms: "There are three treaties in existence; we stick by our treaties unless we decide on something else. At the moment, we stick by our treaties."

At the same time, at the 5th session of the 5th National People's Congress, the constitution was amended to include a new Article 31 which stated that the country might establish Special Administrative Regions (SARs) when necessary.

The additional Article would hold tremendous significance in settling the question of Hong Kong and later Macau, putting into social consciousness the concept of "One country, two systems", which was originally proposed to provide a framework for the reunification of Taiwan with China.

=== Negotiations begin ===
A few months after Thatcher's visit to Beijing, the PRC government had yet to open negotiations with the British government regarding the sovereignty of Hong Kong.

Shortly before the initiation of sovereignty talks, Governor Youde declared his intention to represent the population of Hong Kong at the negotiations. This statement sparked a strong response from the PRC, prompting Deng Xiaoping to denounce talk of "the so-called 'three-legged stool", which implied that Hong Kong was a party to talks on its future, alongside Beijing and London.

At the preliminary stage of the talks, the British government proposed an exchange of sovereignty for administration and the implementation of a British administration post-handover.

The PRC government refused, contending that the notions of sovereignty and administration were inseparable, and although it recognised Macau as a "Chinese territory under Portuguese administration", this was only temporary.

In fact, during informal exchanges between 1979 and 1981, the PRC had proposed a "Macau solution" in Hong Kong, under which it would remain under British administration at China's discretion.

However, this had previously been rejected following the 1967 Leftist riots, with the then Governor, David Trench, claiming the leftists' aim was to leave the UK without effective control, or "to Macau us".

The conflict that arose at that point of the negotiations ended the possibility of further negotiation. During the reception of former British Prime Minister Edward Heath during his sixth visit to the PRC, Deng Xiaoping commented on the impossibility of exchanging sovereignty for administration, declaring an ultimatum: the British government must modify or give up its position or the PRC will announce its resolution of the issue of Hong Kong sovereignty unilaterally.

In 1983, Typhoon Ellen ravaged Hong Kong, causing great amounts of damage to both life and property. The Hong Kong dollar plummeted on Black Saturday, and the Financial Secretary John Bremridge publicly associated the economic uncertainty with the instability of the political climate. In response, the PRC government condemned Britain through the press for "playing the economic card" in order to achieve their ends: to intimidate the PRC into conceding to British demands.

At one point Deng made it clear that he had no intention of continuing any British administration in any part of Hong Kong. In regards to the treaties establishing British control over Kowloon and Hong Kong Island, Robert Cottrell of The Independent wrote "In practical terms, the treaties were worthless, sovereignty would be China's in due course, and any row about it would certainly damage Hong Kong in the short term whatever the eventual outcome."

=== British concession ===
Governor Youde with nine members of the Hong Kong Executive Council travelled to London to discuss with Thatcher the crisis of confidence – the problem with morale among the people of Hong Kong arising from the ruination of the Sino-British talks. The session concluded with Thatcher's writing of a letter addressed to the PRC Premier Zhao Ziyang.

In the letter, she expressed Britain's willingness to explore arrangements optimising the future prospects of Hong Kong while utilising the PRC's proposals as a foundation. Furthermore, and perhaps most significantly, she expressed Britain's concession on its position of a continued British presence in the form of an administration post-handover.

Two rounds of negotiations were held in October and November. On the sixth round of talks in November, Britain formally conceded its intentions of either maintaining a British administration in Hong Kong or seeking some form of co-administration with the PRC, and showed its sincerity in discussing PRC's proposal on the 1997 issue.

Simon Keswick, chairman of Jardine Matheson & Co., said they were not pulling out of Hong Kong, but a new holding company would be established in Bermuda instead. The PRC took this as yet another plot by the British. The Hong Kong government explained that it had been informed about the move only a few days before the announcement. The government would not and could not stop the company from making a business decision.

Just as the atmosphere of the talks was becoming cordial, members of the Legislative Council of Hong Kong felt impatient at the long-running secrecy over the progress of Sino-British talks on the Hong Kong issue. A motion, tabled by legislator Roger Lobo, declared "This Council deems it essential that any proposals for the future of Hong Kong should be debated in this Council before agreement is reached", was passed unanimously.

The PRC attacked the motion furiously, referring to it as "somebody's attempt to play the three-legged stool trick again". At length, the PRC and Britain initiated the Joint Declaration on the question of Hong Kong's future in Beijing. Zhou Nan, the then PRC Deputy Foreign Minister and leader of the negotiation team, and Richard Evans, British Ambassador to Beijing and leader of the team, signed respectively on behalf of the two governments.

== Sino-British Joint Declaration ==
The Sino-British Joint Declaration was signed by Premier of China Zhao Ziyang and Prime Minister of the United Kingdom Margaret Thatcher on 19 December 1984 in Beijing. The Declaration entered into force with the exchange of instruments of ratification on 27 May 1985 and was registered by the People's Republic of China and United Kingdom governments at the United Nations on 12 June 1985.

In the Joint Declaration, the People's Republic of China Government stated that it had decided to resume the exercise of sovereignty over Hong Kong (including Hong Kong Island, Kowloon, and the New Territories) with effect from 1 July 1997 and the United Kingdom Government declared that it would restore Hong Kong to the PRC with effect from 1 July 1997. In the document, the People's Republic of China Government also declared its basic policies regarding Hong Kong.

In accordance with the One country, two systems principle agreed between the United Kingdom and the People's Republic of China, the socialist system of the People's Republic of China would not be practised in the Hong Kong Special Administrative Region (HKSAR), and Hong Kong's previous capitalist system and its way of life would remain unchanged for a period of 50 years.

=== Universal suffrage ===
The Hong Kong Basic Law ensured, among other things, that Hong Kong will retain its legislative system, and people's rights and freedom for fifty years, as a special administrative region (SAR) of China. The central government in Beijing maintains control over Hong Kong's foreign affairs as well as the legal interpretation of the Basic Law. The latter has led democracy advocates and some Hong Kong residents to argue, after the fact, that the territory has yet to achieve universal suffrage as promised by the Basic Law, leading to mass demonstrations in 2014. In 2019, demonstrations that started as a protest against an extradition law also led to massive demonstrations (1.7 million on 11 and 18 August 2019), again demanding universal suffrage, but also the resignation of Carrie Lam (the then-Chief Executive).

In December 2021, Beijing released a document titled "Hong Kong Democratic Progress Under the Framework of One Country, Two Systems", the second such white paper on Hong Kong affairs since 2014. It stated that the central government will work with "all social groups, sectors and stakeholders towards the ultimate goal of election by universal suffrage of the chief executive" and the LegCo while also noting that the Chinese constitution and the Basic Law together "empower the HKSAR to exercise a high degree of autonomy and confirm the central authorities' right to supervise the exercise of this autonomy".

== Drafting of Basic Law ==
The Basic Law was drafted by a Drafting Committee composed of members from both Hong Kong and Mainland China. A Basic Law Consultative Committee formed purely by Hong Kong people was established in 1985 to canvas views in Hong Kong on the drafts.

The first draft was published in April 1988, followed by a five-month public consultation exercise. The second draft was published in February 1989, and the subsequent consultation period ended in October 1989.

The Basic Law was formally promulgated on 4 April 1990 by the National People's Congress and signed by Chinese president Yang Shangkun, together with the designs for the flag and emblem of the HKSAR. Some members of the Basic Law drafting committee were ousted by Beijing following 1989 Tiananmen Square protests and massacre, after voicing views supporting the student protesters.

The Basic Law was said to be a mini-constitution drafted with the participation of Hong Kong people. The political system had been the most controversial issue in the drafting of the Basic Law. The special issue sub-group adopted the political model put forward by Louis Cha. This "mainstream" proposal was criticised for being too conservative.

According to Clauses 158 and 159 of the Basic Law, powers of interpretation and amendment of the Basic Law are vested in the Standing Committee of the National People's Congress and the National People's Congress, respectively. Hong Kong's people have limited influence.

== Tide of migration ==
After the 1989 Tiananmen Square protests and massacre, the Executive Councillors and the Legislative Councillors of Hong Kong unexpectedly held an urgent meeting, in which they agreed unanimously that the British Government should give the people of Hong Kong the right of abode in the United Kingdom.

More than 10,000 Hong Kong residents rushed to Central in order to get an application form for residency in the United Kingdom. On the eve of the deadline, over 100,000 lined up overnight for a British National (Overseas) (BNO) application form. While mass migration began well before 1989, the event led to the peak migration year in 1992 with 66,000 leaving.

Many citizens were pessimistic towards the future of Hong Kong and the transfer of the region's sovereignty. A tide of emigration, which was to last for no less than five years, broke out. At its peak, citizenship of small countries, such as Tonga, was also in great demand.

Singapore, which also had a predominantly Chinese population, was another popular destination, with the country's Commission (now Consulate-General) being besieged by anxious Hong Kong residents. By September 1989, 6,000 applications for residency in Singapore had been approved by the commission.

In April 1997, the acting immigration officer at the US Consulate-General, James DeBates, was suspended after his wife was arrested for the smuggling of Chinese migrants into the United States. The previous year, his predecessor, Jerry Stuchiner, had been arrested for smuggling forged Honduran passports into the territory before being sentenced to 40 months in prison.

Canada (Vancouver and Toronto), the United Kingdom (London, Glasgow, and Manchester), Australia (Perth, Sydney and Melbourne), and the United States (San Francisco, New York, and Los Angeles's San Gabriel Valley) were, by and large, the most popular destinations. (the first 3 are part of the commonwealth) The United Kingdom devised the British Nationality Selection Scheme, granting 50,000 families British citizenship under the British Nationality Act (Hong Kong) 1990.

Vancouver was among the most popular destinations, earning the nickname of "Hongcouver". Richmond, a suburb of Vancouver, was nicknamed "Little Hong Kong".

From the start of the settlement of the negotiation in 1984 to 1997, nearly 1 million people emigrated, representing a serious loss of human and financial capital.

== Last governor ==
Chris Patten became the last Governor of Hong Kong. This was regarded as a turning point in Hong Kong's colonial history. Unlike most of his predecessors, Patten was neither a career colonial official nor a career diplomat, but a career politician and a former Member of Parliament (MP). He introduced democratic reforms which pushed PRC–British relations to a standstill and affected the negotiations for a smooth handover.

Governor Patten introduced a package of electoral reforms in the Legislative Council. These reforms proposed to enlarge the electorate, thus making voting in the Legislative Council more democratic. This move posed significant changes because Hong Kong citizens would have the power to make decisions regarding their future.

After the Patten proposals were passed, Beijing decided to create the Preliminary Working Committee (PWC) on 16 July 1993. Although it was seen by some that such a body was necessary in order to prepare for the transition of sovereignty, the row over the Patten proposals enabled Beijing to issue a warning that unilateral action would result in the setting-up of a "second stove" and, when it was formed, to say it was an unfortunate product of British confrontation.

The Preliminary Working Committee was dissolved in December 1995 and succeeded by the Preparatory Committee in 1996. The Preparatory Committee was responsible for implementation work related to the establishment of the HKSAR, including the establishment of the Selection Committee, which in turn was responsible for the selection of the first chief executive in 1996 and the members of the Provisional Legislative Council which replaced the Legislative Council elected in 1995. The Provisional Legislative Council reverted most of the Patten's reform, by resuming appointed seats to the District Councils, Urban Council and Regional Council, reintroducing corporate voting in some functional constituencies, narrowing the franchise of the nine new functional constituencies to about 20,000 voters, and changed the "single seat, single constituency" method to the proportional representation system for the Legislative Council elections.

Despite the eventual reversal of the electoral system, Patten's reform significantly impacted the Hong Kong political landscape by polarising Hong Kong politics.

== Handover ceremony ==
The handover ceremony was held at the new wing of the Hong Kong Convention and Exhibition Centre in Wan Chai on the night of 30 June 1997.

The principal British guest was Prince Charles, who read a farewell speech on behalf of Queen Elizabeth II. The newly elected Labour prime minister, Tony Blair; the foreign secretary, Robin Cook; the departing governor, Chris Patten; and the chief of the Defence Staff, General Sir Charles Guthrie, also attended.

Representing the People's Republic of China were the CCP general secretary and Chinese president, Jiang Zemin; the Chinese premier, Li Peng; Vice premier and foreign minister, Qian Qichen; Vice chairman of the Central Military Commission, General Zhang Wannian; and the first chief executive Tung Chee-hwa. The event was broadcast around the world.

== Additional effects ==
Chinese communists portrayed the return of Hong Kong as a key moment in the PRC's rise to great power status.

=== Before and after handover ===
Unchanged after 30 June 1997	Changed after 30 June 1997
1. English continued as an official language and is still taught in all schools. However, many schools teach in Cantonese in parallel with Mandarin and English.; 2. The border with the mainland, while now known as the boundary, continued to be patrolled as before, with separate immigration and customs controls.; 3. Hong Kong residents were still required to apply for a Mainland Travel Permit, in order to visit mainland China.; 4. Residents of mainland China still did not have the right of abode in Hong Kong. Instead, they had to apply for a permit to visit or settle in Hong Kong from the PRC government.; 5. Hong Kong remained a common law jurisdiction, with a separate legal system from that used in the mainland, with previous laws remaining in force provided that they did not conflict with the Basic Law.; 6. The Hong Kong dollar continued to be used as its sole currency, and the responsibility of the Hong Kong Monetary Authority. The Bank of China had already started issuing banknotes in 1994.; 7. Hong Kong continued to operate as a separate customs territory from mainland China under Article 116 of the Basic Law.; 8. Hong Kong remained an individual member of various international organisations, such as the World Trade Organization and APEC.; 9. Hong Kong, which remained an individual member of the International Olympic Committee, continued to send its own team to international sporting events such as the Olympics.; 10. Hong Kong maintained Hong Kong Economic and Trade Offices overseas, as well as in the Greater China Region. These include the offices in London, Washington D.C., Brussels and Geneva, previously known as Hong Kong Government Offices.; 11. Many countries' consulates-general in Hong Kong remained outside the jurisdiction of their embassies in Beijing, such as the United States Consulate General, which reports directly to the Department of State.; 12. The Chung Hwa Travel Service, which functioned as Taiwan's de facto mission in Hong Kong, continued to function as before, issuing visas to visitors from Hong Kong, mainland China and other countries. In 2011 it was renamed the Taipei Economic and Cultural Office in Hong Kong.; 13. Hong Kong continued to negotiate and maintain its own aviation bilateral treaties with foreign countries and territories. Agreements with Taiwan signed in 1996 remained in force after the change of sovereignty, and were replaced by "the air transportation agreement between Taiwan and Hong Kong", which retained international regulations, such as regulations on customs.; 14. Signs (and fonts), labels, and roadway construction standards on Hong Kong roads and expressways continue to follow the European Union roadway standards, particularly those of the UK.; 15. Hong Kong continued to drive on the left, unlike mainland China, which drives on the right. Vehicle registration plates continued to be modelled on those of the United Kingdom, white on the front and yellow on the back, with the vehicle registration mark in a similar font.; 16. Hong Kong-registered vehicles still required special cross-border plates to travel to and from mainland China, similar to those of Guangdong. Vehicles registered in the mainland can enter Hong Kong under the Hong Kong mainland China driving scheme.; 17. Hong Kong residents continued to have easier access to many countries, including those in Europe and North America, with Hong Kong SAR passport holders having visa-free access to 154 other countries and territories.; 18. Former colonial citizens could continue using British National (Overseas) and British citizen passports abroad, though China stopped recognizing them in 2021. (See: British nationality law and Hong Kong); 19. Until 2020, it continued to have significantly more political freedoms than mainland China, with the holding of demonstrations and the annual memorial to commemorate the Tiananmen Square protests of 1989 continuing to be held in Victoria Park. Upon the enactment of the Hong Kong national security law, some activities, such as the vigil, have since been officially banned, although others, such as Falun Gong, remain generally tolerated.; 20. It continued to have a multi-party political system, though 2021 electoral reforms of the legislative and district councils required "patriots administering Hong Kong". This is separate from the one-party system led by the Chinese Communist Party in the mainland.; 21. It continued to have more freedom of the press than mainland China, under Article 27 of the Basic Law, despite the growing influence of Beijing.; 22. It also continued to have more religious freedoms, with the Roman Catholic Diocese of Hong Kong remaining under the jurisdiction of the Holy See, instead of the Chinese Patriotic Catholic Association on the mainland. The Falun Gong spiritual practice also remained legal in Hong Kong, despite encountering opposition from the SAR government.; 23. Many other technical standards from the United Kingdom, such as electrical plugs (BS 1363) are still used in Hong Kong. However, telephone companies changed from installing UK-style BS 6312 telephone sockets to installing US-style RJ11 ones. Hong Kong also adopted the digital TV standard devised in mainland China for TV transmissions, instead of DVB-T, to replace PAL-I. (See: Technical standards in Hong Kong); 24. Hong Kong retained a separate international dialling code (852) and telephone numbering plan from that of the mainland. Calls between Hong Kong and the mainland still required international dialling.; 25. Hong Kong retained a separate ISO 3166 code, HK. It also retained a top-level domain, .hk. However, the Chinese code CN-91 was also used.; 26. Hong Kong retained its own separate postal services, with Hongkong Post continuing to operate separately from China Post. It was not made part of the Chinese postcode system, nor did it introduce a postcode system of its own.; 27. The Hong Kong government continued to make a subvention to the English Schools Foundation, responsible for English-medium schools, which would not be phased out until 2016.; 28. The former British military drill, marching and words of command in English remained in service among disciplinary forces until 2022 when Chinese foot drills were introduced to completely replace that of the UK.; 29. Statues of British monarchs remained. Queen Victoria's statue remains in Victoria Park. King George VI's statue similarly remained in Hong Kong Zoological and Botanical Gardens.; 30. British-inspired road names remain unchanged.	1. From 2012, secondary education moved away from the English model of 6 years secondary schooling plus two years of university matriculation to the Chinese model of three years of junior secondary plus another three years of senior secondary, while university education was extended from three years to four.; 2. The chief executive became the head of government, elected by a Selection Committee, whose members were mainly elected from among professional sectors and business leaders. The post of Governor, appointed by the United Kingdom, was abolished.; 3. The Legislative Council, elected in 1995, was dissolved and replaced by a Provisional Legislative Council, before elections were held to a new Council, in which only 20 out of 60 seats were directly elected. The decision to dissolve the Legislative Council and replace it with a Provisional Legislative Council was criticised by representatives of the UK government.; 4. Foreign nationals were not allowed to stand for directly elected seats in the Legislative Council, only for indirectly elected seats.; 5. All public office buildings now flew the flags of the PRC and the Hong Kong SAR. The Union Flag now flew only outside the British Consulate-General and other British premises.; 6. The British national anthem, "God Save the Queen", was no longer played at closedown on television stations. The Chinese national anthem, "March of the Volunteers", was now played instead.; 7. At international sporting events such as the Olympics, Hong Kong was now known as Hong Kong, China. Hong Kong athletes and teams compete under the Hong Kong SAR flag instead of the British flag of Hong Kong, and gold medallists were honoured with the Chinese national anthem, instead of the British national anthem.; 8. The Court of Final Appeal replaced the Judicial Committee of the Privy Council as the highest court of appeal.; 9. The Supreme Court was replaced by the High Court.; 10. The Attorney General was replaced by the Secretary for Justice.; 11. The Central People's Government was now formally represented in Hong Kong by a Liaison Office, dealing with domestic matters. This had been established under British rule as the Xinhua News Agency Hong Kong Branch, before it adopted its present name in 2000.; 12. The Hong Kong SAR Government was now formally represented in Beijing by the Office of the Government of the Hong Kong Special Administrative Region.; 13. The Ministry of Foreign Affairs was represented in Hong Kong by a Commissioner.; 14. The People's Liberation Army established the Hong Kong Garrison, taking over responsibility for defence from British Forces Overseas Hong Kong. The Prince of Wales Building was renamed the Chinese People's Liberation Army Forces Hong Kong Building, while the Prince of Wales Barracks was similarly renamed the Central Barracks, with effect from January 2002.; 15. Flags were no longer flown at the Cenotaph to remember the war dead; previously British troops raised flags representing the British Army, Royal Navy and Royal Air Force every morning, lowering them again before sunset.; 16. Government House was not used as the residence of the first chief executive, Tung Chee-hwa. However, his successor, Donald Tsang, moved into the compound in 2007.; 17. Queen Elizabeth II's portrait was removed from public offices. Coins issued since 1993 no longer had the Queen's head, instead having the Bauhinia.; 18. Postage stamps now displayed the words "Hong Kong, China". A set of definitive stamps, bearing the words "Hong Kong" with no connotation of sovereignty, was introduced in January 1997.; 19. The "Royal" title was dropped from almost all organisations that had been granted it, with the exception of the Royal Hong Kong Yacht Club.; 20. The Crown was removed from the crest of the Hong Kong Police Force, and replaced by the Bauhinia.; 21. Legal references to the "Crown" were replaced by references to the "State". Barristers who had been appointed Queen's Counsel would now be known as Senior Counsel.; 22. The British honours system was replaced by a local system, in which the Grand Bauhinia Medal was the highest award.; 23. Public holidays changed, with British-inspired occasions, such as the Queen's Official Birthday, Liberation Day, and Remembrance Day being replaced by PRC National Day and Hong Kong SAR Establishment Day. Double Ten Day, commemorating the establishment of the Republic of China, was abolished as a public holiday in 1950.; 24. Many of the red Royal Mail pillar boxes were removed from the streets of Hong Kong and replaced by green Hongkong Post boxes. All others were re-painted.; 25. British citizens (without right of abode in Hong Kong) were no longer able to work in Hong Kong without a visa; the policy was changed on 1 April 1997.; 26. The United Kingdom was now represented by the British Consulate General, which reports directly to the Foreign and Commonwealth Office. This has responsibility for British citizens, instead of the Hong Kong Immigration Department. Previously, the country's commercial interests were represented by a British Trade Commission. It was headed by a Senior Trade Commissioner, who became the first Consul-General.; 27. Hong Kong was no longer linked to the Commonwealth and no longer participated in related organisations or events. Consular missions of Commonwealth member states in Hong Kong were no longer known as Commissions, but as Consulates-General.; 28. Countries which did not have diplomatic relations with the United Kingdom, but had diplomatic relations with China, such as North Korea and Iran, were allowed to establish or re-open Consulates-General.; 29. Consulates of countries which maintained diplomatic relations with Taiwan were closed. Only South Africa, which was to establish relations with the People's Republic of China from 1998, was allowed to keep its Consulate General open for an interim period.; 30. Hong Kong's aircraft registration prefix changed from VR to B, bringing it into line with mainland China and Taiwan.; 31. Newspapers, such as the South China Morning Post, changed to heading their pages with "National", rather than "Local" and 'China', and began including Chinese names in Chinese characters. However, the online edition still uses "China" and only displays Chinese names in Roman script.; 32. A giant golden statue of a Bauhinia blakeana was erected in a public space outside the Hong Kong Convention and Exhibition Centre, named Golden Bauhinia Square, along with a Reunification Monument.; 33. Absolute state immunity was restored in Hong Kong until 2024.

=== Rose Garden Project ===
After the Tiananmen Square protests of 1989, the Hong Kong government proposed a grand "Rose Garden Project" to restore faith and solidarity among the residents. As the construction of the new Hong Kong International Airport would extend well after the handover, Governor Wilson met PRC Premier Li Peng in Beijing to ease the mind of the PRC government.

The communist press published stories that the project was an evil plan to bleed Hong Kong dry before the handover, leaving the territory in serious debt. After three years of negotiations, Britain and the PRC finally reached an agreement over the construction of the new airport, and signed a Memorandum of Understanding. Removing hills and reclaiming land, it took only a few years to construct the new airport.

=== Views of the Kowloon Walled City ===
The Walled City was originally a single fort built in the mid-19th century on the site of an earlier 17th-century watch post on the Kowloon Peninsula of Hong Kong. After the ceding of Hong Kong Island to Britain in 1842 (Treaty of Nanjing), Manchu Qing Dynasty authorities of China felt it necessary for them to establish a military and administrative post to rule the area and to check further British influence in the area.

The 1898 Convention which handed additional parts of Hong Kong (the New Territories) to Britain for 99 years excluded the Walled City, with a population of roughly 700. It stated that China could continue to keep troops there, so long as they did not interfere with Britain's temporary rule.

Britain quickly went back on this unofficial part of the agreement, attacking Kowloon Walled City in 1899, only to find it deserted. They did nothing with it, or the outpost, which raised the question of Kowloon Walled City's ownership. The outpost consisted of a yamen, as well as buildings which grew into low-lying, densely packed neighbourhoods from the 1890s to 1940s.

The enclave remained part of Chinese territory despite the turbulent events of the early 20th century that saw the fall of the Qing government, the establishment of the Republic of China and, later, a Communist Chinese government (PRC).

Squatters began to occupy the Walled City, resisting several attempts by Britain in 1948 to drive them out. The Walled City became a haven for criminals and drug addicts, as the Hong Kong Police had no right to enter the City and China refused maintainability. The 1949 foundation of the People's Republic of China added thousands of refugees to the population, many from Guangdong; by this time, Britain had had enough, and simply adopted a "hands-off" policy.

A murder that occurred in Kowloon Walled City in 1959 set off a small diplomatic crisis, as the two nations each tried to get the other to accept responsibility for a vast tract of land now virtually ruled by anti-Manchurian Triads.

After the Joint Declaration in 1984, the PRC allowed British authorities to demolish the city and resettle its inhabitants. The mutual decision to tear down the walled city was made in 1987. The government spent up to HK$3 billion to resettle the residents and shops.

Some residents were not satisfied with the compensation, and some even obstructed the demolition in every possible way. Ultimately, everything was settled, and the Walled City became a park.

== International reaction ==
The Republic of China (Taiwan) promulgated the Laws and Regulations Regarding Hong Kong & Macao Affairs on 2 April 1997 by Presidential Order, and the Executive Yuan on 19 June 1997 ordered the provisions pertaining to Hong Kong to take effect on 1 July 1997.

The United States–Hong Kong Policy Act or more commonly known as the Hong Kong Policy Act (PL no. 102-383m 106 Stat. 1448) is a 1992 act enacted by the United States Congress. It allows the United States to continue to treat Hong Kong separately from China for matters concerning trade export and economics control after the handover.

The United States was represented by then Secretary of State Madeleine Albright at the Hong Kong handover ceremony. However, she partially boycotted it in protest of China's dissolution of the democratically elected Hong Kong legislature.

== End of the British Empire ==
The handover marked the end of British rule in Hong Kong, which was Britain's last substantial overseas territory. Although in statute law set down by Parliament, British Hong Kong had no status of pre-eminence vis-a-vis the other British Dependent Territories (as they were then classified before the term British Overseas Territory was introduced in 2002), Hong Kong was by far the most populous and economically potent. In 1997 the colony had a population of approximately 6.5 million, which represented roughly 97% of the population of the British Dependent Territories as a whole at that time (the next largest, Bermuda, having a 1997 population of approximately only 62,000). With a gross domestic product of approximately US$180 billion in the last year of British rule, Hong Kong's economy was roughly 11% the size of Britain's. Therefore, although the economies of the United Kingdom and Hong Kong were measured separately, the Handover did mean the British economy in its very broadest sense became substantially smaller (by comparison, the acquisition of Hong Kong boosted the size of the Chinese economy, which was then smaller than the United Kingdom's, by 18.4%). As a comparator to Hong Kong, in 2017 Bermuda (as with population, the economically largest of Britain's remaining territories) had a GDP of only US$4.7 billion.

The cession of Hong Kong meant that Britain's remaining territories (excepting the United Kingdom itself) henceforth consisted either of uninhabited lands (for instance the British Antarctic Territory), small islands or micro land masses (such as Montserrat), territories used as military bases (for example Akrotiri and Dhekelia on the island of Cyprus, itself a former crown colony granted independence in 1960), or a combination of the latter two (like Gibraltar). While many of Britain's remaining territories are significant to the global economy by virtue of being offshore financial centres (Bermuda, the British Virgin Islands, and the Cayman Islands being the most prominent of these), their economies are insubstantial. Demographically, they are also tiny compared to Britain, with a collective population of less than 0.4% of Britain's 2017 population of 66 million. As of 2018, the combined population of Britain's remaining fourteen Overseas Territories is approximately 250,000, which is less than all but three districts of Hong Kong, and roughly equal to that of the City of Westminster.

Consequently, because ceding Hong Kong came at the end of half a century of decolonisation, and because the handover meant that the United Kingdom became without significant overseas territories, dominions, or colonies for the first time in its history (Great Britain, having been bequeathed the incipient domains of its later empire by inheriting the colonial possessions of the Kingdom of England upon the passing of the Acts of Union 1707, always having been an imperial power, ab initio), the handover of Hong Kong to China is regarded by many (including King Charles III) as marking the conclusion of the British Empire, with 1 July 1997 being its end date and the handover ceremony being its last diplomatic act.

== In popular culture ==
Scholars have begun to study the complexities of the transfer as shown in the popular media, such as films, television and video and online games. For example, Hong Kong director Fruit Chan made a sci-fi thriller The Midnight After (2014) that stressed the sense of loss and alienation represented by survivors in an apocalyptic Hong Kong. Chan infuses a political agenda in the film by playing on Hong Kongers' collective anxiety towards communist China. Yiman Wang has argued that America has viewed China through the prisms of films from Shanghai and Hong Kong, with a recent emphasis on futuristic disaster films set in Hong Kong after the transfer goes awry.

- The first scripts of 1997 James Bond film Tomorrow Never Dies featured a violent disruption of the transfer of Hong Kong. The plot was re-written out of the concern that if something were to happen during the handover, the film, scheduled to release a few months later, would look out of place.
- The handover is central to the plot of the 1998 action comedy Rush Hour.
- It is also mentioned in another 1998 film – Knock Off.
- The handover is the backdrop for "A Death in Hong Kong", the first episode the tenth season of Murder, She Wrote.
- Hong Kong Cantopop artist Sam Hui has made numerous references to 1997 including the song "Could Not Care Less About 1997" (話知你97).
- The 1991 song "Queen's Road East" by Lo Ta-yu featuring Ram Chiang satirically expresses the anxiety felt by Hong Kong residents over the handover.
- Cui Jian's 1997 single "Get Over That Day" tells the story of a man who learns about the impending return of his never-before-met sister to their dysfunctional family, alluding to the handover of Hong Kong.
- Chinese American rapper Jin Auyeung has a song called "1997" in his Cantonese album ABC, which he makes references to the handover, ten years since Hong Kong's return to China.
- Zero Minus Ten, a James Bond novel by Raymond Benson, is set largely in Hong Kong during the days leading up to the Handover.
- The 2012 James Bond film Skyfall features a villain who had been an MI6 agent in Hong Kong until the Handover, when he was handed over to the Chinese for his unauthorised hacking of their security networks.
- The Doctor Who Unbound audio drama Sympathy for the Devil by Jonathan Clements is set on the eve of the Handover and involves an attempted defection by a war criminal, only hours before China takes control.
- The 2014 video game Wargame: Red Dragon features a campaign set in an alternate history in which negotiations over the ceding of Hong Kong break down resulting in armed conflict.
- Hong Kong 97, a 1994 American movie starring Robert Patrick, is set in Hong Kong during the 24 hours before the end of British rule.
- Hong Kong 97, a 1995 Japanese homebrew SNES game, is set in Hong Kong around the time of the transition. The player controls Chin (Jackie Chan), who was called by the Hong Kong government to kill the invading Chinese, including Tong Shau Ping. The game gained a cult following due to its very poor quality and absurd plot.
- The handover of Hong Kong is referenced multiple times and witnessed in the 1997 film Chinese Box, starring Jeremy Irons and Gong Li. The film itself was filmed leading up to and during the handover.
- The handover is depicted near the conclusion of the 2003 Hong Kong film Infernal Affairs II, with the event referenced throughout the film and serves as the background of the story. Analysis on the franchise has suggested the films' messaging to be associated with fears, anxieties and identity crisis of the Hong-Kong identity post-takeover.
- The handover of Hong Kong is portrayed in the fifth season of Netflix's historical-drama series The Crown (2022), in the season's final episode "Decommissioned".

== See also ==
- Hong Kong people in the United Kingdom
- Hong Kong Act 1985
- Monument in Commemoration of the Return of Hong Kong to China
- Handover of Macau
- Hong Kong 1 July marches
- Hong Kong–Mainland conflict

== Bibliography ==
- Collins, Lawrence; Morse, C.G.J.; McClean, David; Briggs, Adrian; Harris, Jonathan; McLachlan, Campbell; Hill, Jonathan (2008). Dicey, Morris and Collins on the Conflict of Laws (14th ed.). Sweet & Maxwell. ISBN 978-0-421-88360-4.
- Fawcett, J.J.; Carruthers, J.M.; North, Peter (2008). Cheshire, North & Fawcett: Private International Law. OUP Oxford. ISBN 978-0-19-928438-2.
- Flowerdew, John (1998). The Final Years of British Hong Kong: The Discourse of Colonial Withdrawal. Basingstoke, Hampshire: Macmillan. ISBN 978-0-333-68312-5.
- Lane, Kevin (1990). Sovereignty and The Status Quo: The Historical Roots of China's Hong Kong Policy. Boulder: Westview Press. ISBN 978-0-8133-7681-3.
- Loh, Christine (2010). Underground front. Hong Kong University Press. ISBN 9789622099968.
- Mark, Chi-kwan (2017). "To 'educate' Deng Xiaoping in capitalism: Thatcher's visit to China and the future of Hong Kong in 1982". Cold War History. 17 (2): 161–180. doi:10.1080/14682745.2015.1094058. ISSN 1468-2745.
- Sing, Ming (2004). Hong Kong's Tortuous Democratization: A Comparative Analysis. Routledge. ISBN 0203180402.
- Tang, James T. H. (1994). "From Empire Defence to Imperial Retreat: Britain's Postwar China Policy and the Decolonization of Hong Kong". Modern Asian Studies. 28 (2): 317–337. doi:10.1017/S0026749X00012427. ISSN 0026-749X.
