= Oswald Cheung =

Hong Kong politician

Sir Oswald Victor Cheung CBE QC SC JP
- 張奧偉
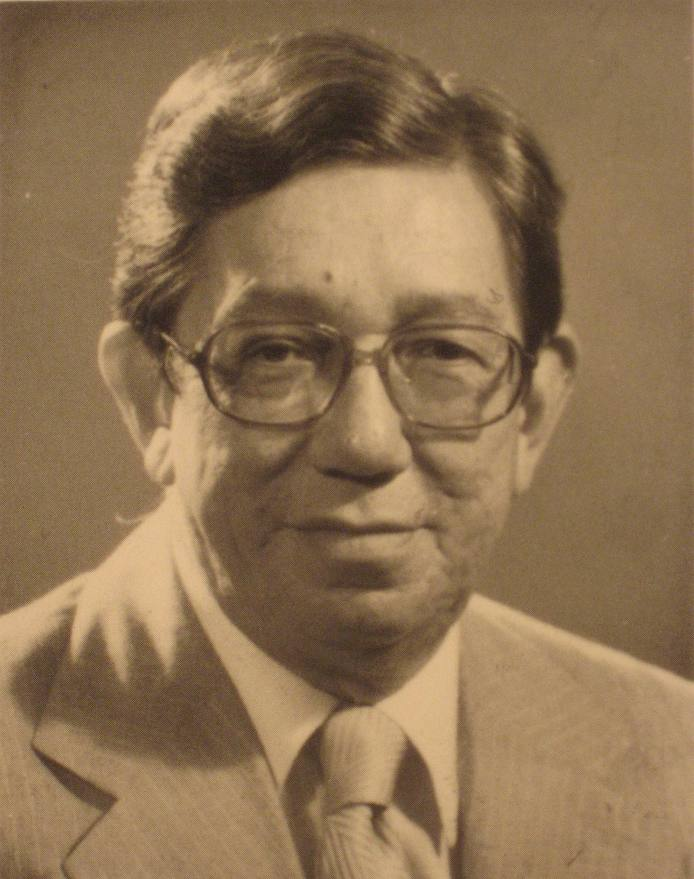
- Sir "Ossie" Cheung

Senior Chinese Unofficial Member of the Legislative Council
- In office 1978–1981
- Appointed by: Murray MacLehose
- Preceded by: Chung Sze Yuen
- Succeeded by: Harry Fang

Personal details
- Born: 22 January 1922 Hong Kong
- Died: 10 December 2003 (aged 81) Pok Fu Lam, Hong Kong
- Cause of death: Complications from burns
- Spouse: Pauline Cheng
- Education: Diocesan Boys' School
- Alma mater: University of Hong Kong; University College, Oxford
- Occupation: Barrister

Sir Oswald Victor Cheung CBE QC SC JP (Chinese: 張奧偉; 22 January 1922 – 10 December 2003) was a barrister in Hong Kong, known as the "doyen of the bar".

"Ossie" was the first ethnic Chinese to become a Queen's Counsel in colonial Hong Kong, and the first Chinese chairman of the Royal Hong Kong Jockey Club. Cheung was a mentor to a number of eminent lawyers, including Audrey Eu and Margaret Ng.

== Biography ==
Born in Hong Kong in 1922, Cheung was brought up in the territory, and was educated at the Diocesan Boys' School, where he graduated in 1938. Not quite 16 years old at the time, he entered university. From 1938 to 1941, he read natural sciences at the University of Hong Kong, and received a degree in mathematics and chemistry upon his graduation. During the Pacific War, his family moved first to Macao, and then to China. He joined the British Army Aid Group and aided the British intelligence effort over the Japanese. He moved to Calcutta in 1945, and in 1947, after the war ended, he received a scholarship to study a Master's in Law at University College, Oxford. Upon graduation, he was admitted to Lincoln's Inn.

Cheung was called to the Bar of England by the Inn in 1951. He was appointed Queen's Counsel in 1965 and in the same year he set up Sir Oswald Cheung's Chambers. He served as the Honorary Secretary of the Hong Kong Bar Association in 1952 and rose to become chairman in 1966, gaining life membership of the association in 1996.

Cheung also had a long record of public service during the post-war years. He served on numerous government boards and committees. Professionally, he was member of the Supreme Court Rules Committee (1960-1970), chairman of the Criminal Injuries Compensation Board and the Law Enforcement Injuries Compensation Board. Non-government roles included member of the Hong Kong Policy Committee on the Christian Children's Fund (1960-1964). He was active on behalf of the Children's Meals Society, the Police Children's Education Trust, the Po Leung Kuk and the Sir David Trench Recreation Fund Investment Advisory Committee.

For the government, he became a member of the Traffic Advisory Committee, the Economic Review Committee and the Fifth Marketing Advisory Board, the Fisheries Development Loan Fund Advisory Committee and director and panel member of the review board of the Inland Revenue.

Cheung also served as a member of the Universities & Polytechnic Grants Committee. He was a member of the Legislative Council from 1970 to 1981 and the Executive Council from 1974 to 1986. He was bestowed with an OBE in 1972, and knighted in 1987.

=== Personal ===
An avid cigar aficionado, Cheung received burns when his silk pyjamas caught fire as he attempted to light a cigar. He died of complications on 10 December 2003.

=== Public service record ===
- Captain in the Royal Hong Kong Regiment (1956-1962)
- Chairman, Hong Kong Bar Association 1966;
- Member of the Legislative Council from 1970 to 1981 where and he was the Senior Chinese Unofficial Member from 1978 to 1981;
- Member of the Executive Council from 1974 to 1986
- Lincoln's Inn bencher: 1987–2003

=== Honours ===
Knight Bachelor: 1987

Legislative Council of Hong Kong
Preceded by Chung Sze Yuen	Senior Chinese Unofficial Member in Legislative Council; 1978–1981	Succeeded by Harry Fang
Preceded by Chung Sze Yuen	Senior Unofficial Member in Legislative Council; 1978–1981	Succeeded by Roger Lobo
Sporting positions
Preceded by Sir Michael Sandberg	Chairman of the Royal Hong Kong Jockey Club; 1986–1989	Succeeded by Sir Gordon Macwhinnie
