= Lydia Dunn =

Hong Kong politician (born 1940)

The Right Honourable The Baroness Dunn DBE JP
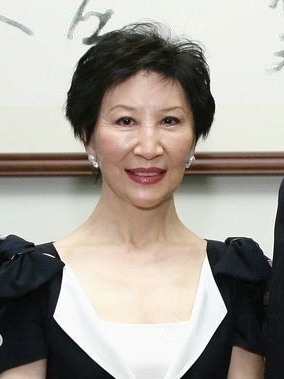
- Dunn in 2008

Member of the House of Lords
- Lord Temporal
- Life peerage 24 August 1990 – 30 June 2010

Senior Member of the Executive Council
- In office 25 August 1988 – 26 July 1995
- Preceded by: Sir Sze-yuen Chung
- Succeeded by: Rosanna Wong

Senior Member of the Legislative Council
- In office 7 August 1985 – 25 August 1988
- Preceded by: Roger Lobo
- Succeeded by: Allen Lee

Member of the Executive Council
- In office 1 September 1982 – 26 July 1995
- Appointed by: Sir Edward Youde; David Wilson; Chris Patten

Member of the Legislative Council
- In office 1 September 1976 – 25 August 1988
- Appointed by: Sir Murray MacLehose; Sir Edward Youde; David Wilson

Personal details
- Born: 29 February 1940 (age 86) British Hong Kong
- Spouse: Michael Thomas (m. 1988)
- Education: University of California, Berkeley

Lydia Dunn
- Traditional Chinese: 鄧蓮如
- Simplified Chinese: 邓莲如
Transcriptions
Standard Mandarin
- Hanyu Pinyin: Dèng Liánrú
Yue: Cantonese
- Jyutping: dang6 lin4 jyu4

Lydia Selina Dunn, Baroness Dunn, DBE, JP (Chinese: 鄧蓮如; born 29 February 1940) is a Hong Kong-born retired British businesswoman and politician. She became the second person of Hong Kong origin (the first was Lawrence Kadoorie, Baron Kadoorie) and the first female ethnic Chinese Hongkonger to be elevated to the peerage as a life peeress with the title and style of Baroness in 1990.

Launching her career in British firms Swire Group and HSBC Group, she was an Unofficial Member and then the Senior Member of the Executive Council and Legislative Council of Hong Kong in the 1980s and 1990s, witnessing the major events of Hong Kong including the Sino-British Joint Declaration and the Tiananmen Square protests of 1989. She is best known in Hong Kong for her part in (unsuccessfully) lobbying for the people of Hong Kong to have the right of abode in the United Kingdom after the Handover of Hong Kong on 1 July 1997, and she remained influential until her retirement from Hong Kong politics in 1995.

From 1990 to 2010, she also served as a member of the House of Lords, the first ethnic Chinese person to assume such position. She resigned from the House of Lords in 2010 following the Constitutional Reform and Governance Act 2010 which effectively disallows "Non-Doms" from sitting in either House of the British Parliament.

== Early life, business and public career ==
Dunn was born in Hong Kong to refugee parents from China. She was educated at the St. Paul's Convent School in Hong Kong, and at the College of the Holy Names and at the University of California, Berkeley. Upon her return to Hong Kong, she was hired by the Swire Group where she kept rising to the directorships of the John Swire and Sons (HK) Ltd., Swire Pacific Ltd., and Cathay Pacific Airways. In 1981, she became the first woman to sit on the director board of the Hong Kong and Shanghai Bank. From 1992 to 2008, she was the bank's deputy chairman.

Dunn also served on many public positions, including the chairmanship of the Trade Development Council from 1983 to 1991. In that capacity, she led missions abroad to promote Hong Kong textile and clothing products as well as stood firm against protectionism in her report for the Trade Policy Research Centre in 1983 on 'Protectionism and the Asian-Pacific Region'. She was also the director of the Mass Transit Railway Corporation from 1979 to 1985 and served as the chairman of the Prince Philip Dental Hospital from 1981 to 1987, during the formative years of the University of Hong Kong’s Faculty of Dentistry.

== Political career ==
Dunn first entered Hong Kong politics when she was made an Unofficial Member of the Legislative Council of Hong Kong in 1976 by Governor Murray MacLehose. In 1982, she was made an Unofficial Member of the Executive Council by Governor Edward Youde.

During the Sino-British negotiations over the transfer of Hong Kong sovereignty to China in the early 1980s, Dunn participated as a member of the delegations of Unofficial Members of the Executive and Legislative Councils, led by Senior Unofficial Member of the Executive Council Sir Sze-yuen Chung, who travelled to London and Beijing to meet with Margaret Thatcher and Deng Xiaoping. The aims of the members were to raise the concerns of the Hong Kong people and to negotiate for a better deal for Hong Kong. However, Beijing authorities rejected their suggestion that Hong Kong people had an independent role to play in the negotiations. From 1985 to 1988, Dunn was the Senior Member of the Legislative Council. In 1988, she succeeded Chung to become the Senior Member of the Executive Council.

After the signing of the 1984 Sino-British Joint Declaration, which ensured Chinese sovereignty over Hong Kong after 1997, Dunn urged the British government to grant Hong Kong residents the right of abode in Britain. She is best remembered in Hong Kong for breaking down in tears while giving testimony before a British parliamentary committee that was examining the Hong Kong Question in May 1989 amidst the tumultuous Tiananmen Square protests of 1989 in China. Dunn said the British government would be "morally indefensible" for surrendering "British citizens to a regime that did not hesitate to use its tanks and forces on its own people". Britain refused to change its restrictive nationality policy, but eventually allowed about 50,000 Hong Kong families to become British citizens through the British Nationality Selection Scheme in 1990 in the aftermath of the Tiananmen massacre. That year, Dunn was appointed to the House of Lords in 1989.

In May 1989, Dunn and several other Unofficial Members of the Executive and Legislative Councils presented the Basic Law Drafting Committee with a proposal for an "OMELCO Consensus" model for the post-1997 process of electing the Chief Executive, providing a moderate alternative to those put forth by the pro-democracy camp and the conservative hardliners from the business and professional community. However, following Beijing's disapproval of the "OMELCO Consensus", Dunn softened her tone. In a House of Lords debate in 1992, Dunn described having more directly elected seats as "unwise" and talked of it as "reviving uncertainty, tension and discord in our community." She also said that "for the British Government to put a request to the Chinese Government, asking for democracy -- that, too, will be improper."

Following Chris Patten's arrival in Hong Kong as the colony's last governor in 1992, Dunn supported his proposal of separating the Executive Council from the Legislative Council so as to allow for more checks and balances. After a reshuffling of the Executive Council, Dunn became its sole remaining member. Subsequently, she became more outwardly discreet during the Patten governorship. It was widely speculated that she had lost her political influence due to her disagreement with the governor over his more confrontational approach in dealing with the Chinese as compared to her consensual approach. In 1995, Dunn announced that she was retiring from Hong Kong politics, fueling speculation in the media over whether she still believed in the territory's future after 1997.

While former British-appointed politicians found new favour with Beijing authorities in the run-up to 1997, Dunn bucked the trend by reinforcing her ties to Britain, retaining her seat in the House of Lords and maintaining high-profile positions in British companies, including HSBC Holdings. In 1996, she relocated to Britain with her British husband Michael Thomas, the former Attorney General of Hong Kong.

Dunn rarely sat or spoke in the House of Lords during her years as a peer. After the passage of the Constitutional Reform and Governance Act 2010, she resigned from the British upper house in 2010 to preserve her "Non-Dom" status.

== Personal life ==
Dunn is married to Michael David Thomas, former Attorney General of Hong Kong in 1988. She has four stepchildren from Thomas's previous marriage. She has reportedly been living in London since 1996. In 2010, Dunn auctioned 160 items from her private art collection at Christie's, with lots reportedly valued at up to GBP30,000 (HK$354,000) each.

== Honours ==
For her services to Hong Kong, Dunn was made an OBE (Officer of the Order of the British Empire) in 1978, and then a CBE (Commander) in 1983. In 1989, she was appointed DBE (Dame Commander), reportedly the first from Hong Kong to have such an honour. One year later, she became the first ethnic Chinese and the first woman Hongkonger to be elevated to the British peerage in the Queen Elizabeth II’s 1990 Birthday Honours. She was introduced to the House of Lords as Baroness Dunn, of Hong Kong Island in Hong Kong and of Knightsbridge in the Royal Borough of Kensington and Chelsea on 24 August 1990. Dunn was also awarded the Prime Minister of Japan's Trade Award in 1987 and the United States' Secretary of Commerce award in 1988.

In 1984, she was conferred an honorary degree of Doctor of Laws by the Chinese University of Hong Kong. In 1991, she was conferred an honorary degree of Doctor of Laws by the University of Hong Kong. She also received Doctor of Science honoris causa by the University of Buckingham in 1995.

== Publication ==
- In the Kingdom of the Blind (1983)

== See also ==
- European politicians of Chinese descent
- Senior Chinese Unofficial Member

Political offices
| Preceded by Sir Yuet-keung Kan | Chairman of the Hong Kong Trade Development Council; 1983–1991 | Succeeded by Victor Fung |
| Preceded by Sir Sze-yuen Chung | Senior Member in Executive Council; 1988–1995 | Succeeded by Rosanna Wong |
Legislative Council of Hong Kong
| Preceded by Harry Fang | Senior Chinese Member in Legislative Council; 1985–1988 | Succeeded by Allen Lee |
| Preceded by Roger Lobo | Senior Member in Legislative Council; 1985–1988 | Succeeded by Allen Lee |
