= Golden Bauhinia Square =

Open area in Wan Chai, Hong Kong

Coordinates: 22°17′3.36″N 114°10′25.53″E

- Traditional Chinese: 金紫荊廣場
- Simplified Chinese: 金紫荆广场
Transcriptions
Standard Mandarin
- Hanyu Pinyin: Jīn Zǐjīng Guǎngchǎng
Yue: Cantonese
- Jyutping: gam1 zi2 ging1 gwong2 coeng4

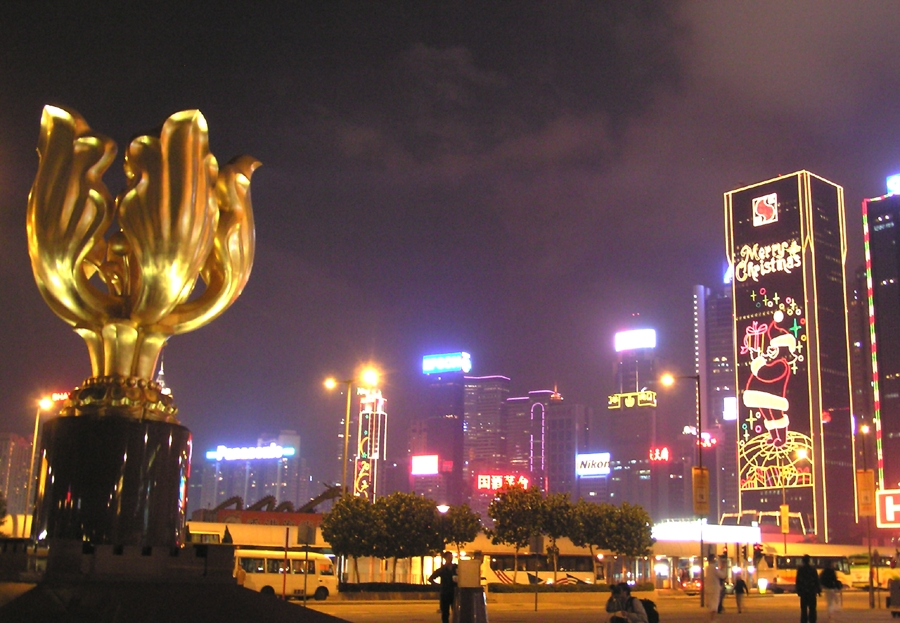
The square at night, 2004

The Golden Bauhinia Square (Chinese: 金紫荊廣場; Jyutping: gam1 zi2 ging1 gwong2 coeng4) is an open area in Wan Chai, Hong Kong. The square was named after the giant statue of a golden Bauhinia blakeana at the centre of the area, situated outside the Hong Kong Convention and Exhibition Centre, where the ceremonies for the handover of Hong Kong and the establishment of the Hong Kong Special Administrative Region were held in July 1997. A flag-raising ceremony is held every day at 8 a.m. It is considered a tourist attraction.

The sculpture, a gilded flower bauhinia, is six metres high. The major part is composed of a bauhinia on a base of red granite pillar on a pyramid.

The sculpture is deemed an important symbol for the Hong Kong people after the handover. On the second day of Chinese New Year and National Day of the People's Republic of China, the square is lit up by a firework show. The Golden Bauhinia has also been nicknamed the "Golden Pak Choi" by locals.

== Flag-raising ceremony ==
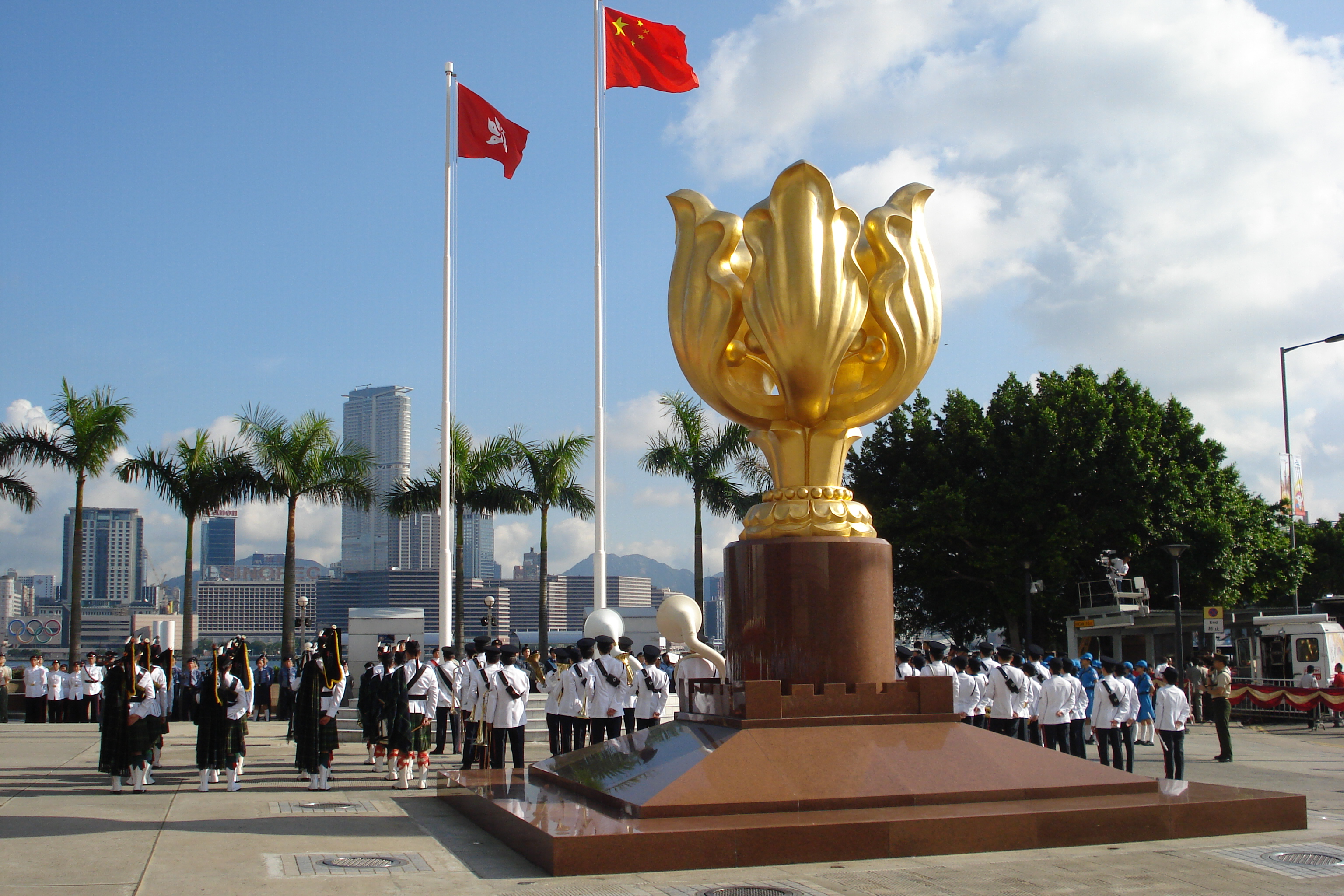
Flag raising ceremony conducted by youth uniformed groups on 30 August 2008 to welcome national parathletes from Mainland China before the 2008 Summer Paralympics

The official daily flag raising ceremony at the Golden Bauhinia Square located outside the Hong Kong Convention and Exhibition Centre is conducted by the Hong Kong Police Force. There are three types of ceremonies: Daily Flag Raising Ceremony (Daily, every day except 1st of each month), Enhanced Flag Raising Ceremony (on the 1st of every month, except July and October) and the Special Flag Raising Ceremony (1 July and 1 October).

The daily ceremony includes regular attire and includes the playing of the national anthem, while the enhanced ceremony includes a flag-raising party of Hong Kong police officers, accompanied by a rifle unit all in ceremonial dress, and also includes the playing of the national anthem by the Police Band followed by a 10-minute musical performance by the Police Pipe Band.

Since July 2008, on the second Sunday of each month, the flag raising ceremony is conducted by different local youth uniformed groups (UGs). The UGs conduct the daily flag raising ceremony (i.e. the flag party consists of five members: one commander, two national flag raisers and two regional flag raisers) without a band performance.

== See also ==
- Lotus Square, Macau
- Monument in Commemoration of the Return of Hong Kong to China
- Wan Chai District
