= Pedro José Lobo =

Macanese cultural figure

Pedro José Lobo Order of the Colonial Empire, Order of Infante D. Henrique (Manatuto, Timor-Leste, January 12, 1892 – Hong Kong, October 1, 1965) was an important entrepreneur, politician, philanthropist, civil servant, musician, leader and cultural facilitator of Macau, a prominent member of the Macanese elite of the time.

As head of the Central Bureau of Economic Services, Pedro José Lobo distinguished himself during World War II, in the resolution of the 1952 Portas do Cerco Incident, and in the gold trade, which enriched him. He was also owner and manager of the Macau Water Supply Company and founder of the Macau Air Transport Company (MATCO), in 1948. He was also a patron and promoter of Macau's cultural, musical and artistic life. He founded Rádio Vila Verde and the Cultural Circle of Macau.

Lobo was president of the Municipal Council of Macau (1959–1964) and member of the Santa Casa da Misericórdia. In religious terms, he was a member of the Congregation of Our Lady of Fatima, which brought together Catholic local devotees to Our Lady of Fatima.

== Biography ==
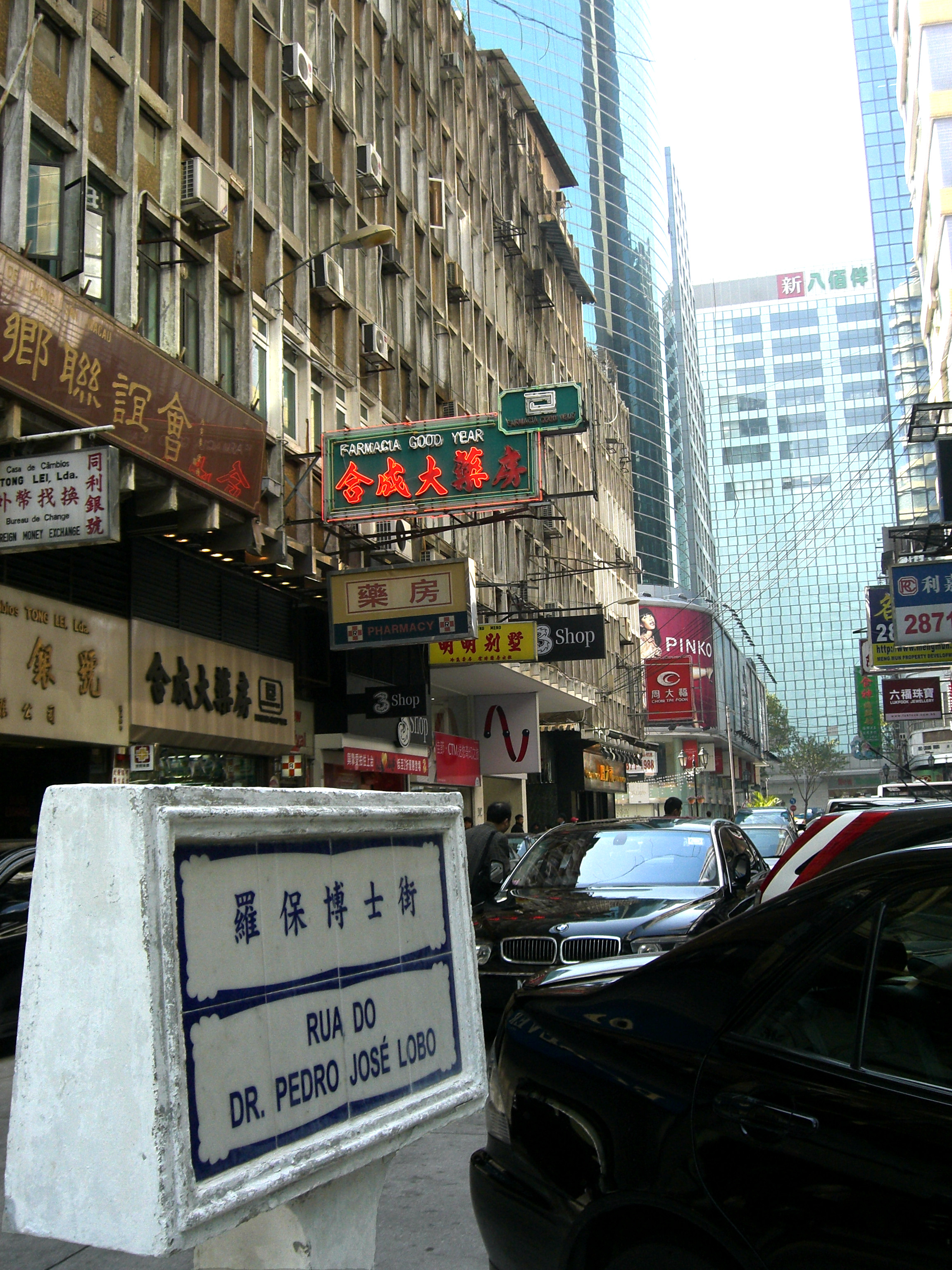
Rua do Dr. Pedro Jose Lobo

On January 12, 1892, Pedro José Lobo was born in Manatuto, in Timor-Leste. Of Portuguese nationality, he was a mestizo Portuguese-descendant or Macanese from Timor, with Malay, Chinese, Dutch and Portuguese ancestors. Lobo's adoptive father was the lawyer Belarmino Lobo, born in Goa on May 21, 1849 and died in Dili on November 9, 1914. On October 20, 1917, the government official in Timor, César Augusto Rocha de Abreu Castelo Branco released him, "upon request, from the position of member of the Dili Municipal Commission".

Lobo studied at the prestigious São José Seminary in Macau. On October 16, 1920, Pedro Lobo married in Hong Kong Branca Helena Hyndman, the daughter of an old Macanese family that lived in Macau in the 18th century and in Hong Kong in the early years of its foundation. The Hyndman family, influential in Hong Kong, has Scottish, Portuguese and Asian ancestry.

Lobo had six children with Branca Hyndman: Marieta Hyndman Lobo, Olivia Maria Hyndman Lobo, Rogério Hyndman Lobo (or Sir Roger Lobo), Natércia Hyndman Lobo, Orlando dos Passos Hyndman Lobo and Pedro Hyndman Lobo.

=== World War II ===
During World War II, Pedro Lobo, as director of the Central Bureau of Economic Services (also called the Bureau of Economic Services of Macau) had to deal with the Japanese to solve the desperate problem of scarcity of food and other necessities. The Japanese had seized the Hong Kong region in December 1941 and thus de facto controlled the borders of the officially neutral Portuguese colony. To deal with this problem, Pedro Lobo, representing the Government of Macau, proceeded to nationalize all food items in Macau's private businesses and stores. This nationalization consisted of buying all the necessary food items, such as rice, cereals and preserved cans, at a fair market price, and storing them in government stores created for this purpose. However, this solution failed to free Macau from long-term hunger, as many people, especially refugees, were unable to afford the increasingly astronomical prices of food, resorting to and emptying these public stores.

As the problem worsened, the Government of Macau, headed by Governor Gabriel Maurício Teixeira and represented by Pedro Lobo, had to deliver to the Japanese everything that had value, including ships, cannons and communication equipment, in exchange for food. Thus, the Japanese were able to control Macau's economic and political activity. In fact, Colonel Sawa, a commander of the Kempeitai, was effectively the shadow chief of the Macau Bureau of Economic Services, then formally led by Pedro Lobo.

To manage trade between the Government and the Japanese, the latter created the Macau Cooperative Company (CCM), a monopoly company owned by the Government (33.3%), the Japanese army (33.3%) and several wealthy entrepreneurs (33.3%), most of whom were from Hong Kong. These entrepreneurs, among whom Sir Robert Ho Tung stood out, managed to take refuge and transfer their business and goods to Macau, even before Hong Kong was occupied by the Japanese. Officially, this monopoly company was managed by Pedro José Lobo, the delegate of the Government of Macau. But in fact it was controlled by the Japanese and served the Japanese political-military objectives of controlling the circulation of essential goods in Macau.

In addition to the Japanese, the Macau Cooperative Company (CCM) also served the interests of its business shareholders and speculators, who were able to profit from the food shortages caused by the war. However, the Macau Government, more concerned with keeping Japanese food permits and meeting the basic needs of its population, did not care that the private shareholders profited from it. From this and other businesses Stanley Ho, who achieved a prominent position at CCM because of his great uncle Robert Ho Tung, and Pedro José Lobo, became rich.

Near the end of the war, on January 16, 1945, the gas tanks of the Outer Harbor and several strategic points in Macau were bombed and machine-gunned by American planes, despite the fact that Macau was neutral territory. The air raid left five dead and several injured. Gasoline, which was to be sold to the Japanese that day in exchange for rice, was set on fire. Lobo, who was the exchange negotiator and was present in the warehouses at the time of the attack, fled immediately to his car, which was also strafed and machine-gunned. He managed to survive because he threw himself on the ground, abandoning the car.

=== Gold trading ===
After the Second World War, the gold trade became one of the most important economic activities in Macau, because Macau was not currently covered by the 1944 Bretton Woods agreements. These international agreements fixed exchange rates and restricted world trade in gold, banning imports of gold for individual use and stipulating that each troy ounce of gold legally cost US$35.

At that time, the lucrative but obscure trade in gold was effectively controlled by a restricted group of businessmen from Macau and Hong Kong, among whom were Ho Sin Hang, Cheng Yu Tung, YC Liang, Ho Yin and Pedro José Lobo. With his involvement in the gold trade, Pedro Lobo became one of the wealthiest men in Macau and Far East, in the 1950s. However, not all historians agree that the concession of the monopoly of the gold trade was attributed to Pedro Lobo. In addition to being an entrepreneur, he also controlled the issuing and granting of licenses for import, including gold, since he was at the time the head of the Central Bureau of Economic Services of Macau. With this control, Pedro Lobo managed to create "a group of strong allies, who gave him information, who told him what was going on".

At the time, it was said that Pedro Lobo was the only citizen of Macau who could smuggle gold without being arrested by the authorities. This gold was purchased in countries that did not adhere to the Bretton Woods Agreements (e.g. Russia and Mexico) at a price much lower than the international reference value stipulated by the Agreements. The gold was transported from Hong Kong to Macau every Saturday by a seaplane Catalina from Macau Air Transport Company (MATCO). It was said that the police themselves helped to unload this gold, which was then sold at an international reference price ($35 per ounce) in Macau, entering the official circuit and thus giving Pedro Lobo a good profit.

Pedro José Lobo also profited from the Macau-Hong Kong air link made by Macau Air Transport Company (MATCO) seaplanes, which was founded in 1948 by Pedro Lobo and the Cathay Pacific founders. At the time, this company was the only company that flew the Macau-Hong Kong air route and served to transport gold from Hong Kong to Macau. This gold, which arrived in Hong Kong from several different countries, could not be traded in Hong Kong, because this British colony was covered by the Bretton Woods Agreements at that time. Due to this fact, a Macau-Hong Kong trade axis was established, in which Hong Kong, British, French, Swiss, and American businessmen also participated, thus using Macau to "legalize [their] business".

Due to his importance and wealth, several magazines and writers wrote about Pedro Lobo, as was the case with Life magazine and the book "Thrilling Cities" (1959) by Ian Fleming, best known for being the creator of James Bond. Ian Fleming, who visited Macau in 1959, interviewed Pedro Lobo about the gold trade and his impressions of Macau. Some authors claim that Pedro José Lobo served as the basis for the creation of the characters Goldfinger and Oddjob, who appear in the adventures of James Bond.

=== Siege Gate Incident ===
In 1952, during Joaquim Marques Esparteiro, the Portas do Cerco Incident took place, a series of small armed conflicts between Portuguese and Chinese soldiers at the Portas do Cerco, the land border between Macau and Mainland China. At that time, this boundary was not yet well-defined, thus generating confusion and disputes. The incident was mainly caused by the fact that the Government of Macau decided, under pressure from the governments of Portugal and the United States of America, to increase control of the movement of goods between Macau and the People's Republic of China, which at that time was under a Western embargo. The Government planned to set up a Trade Coordinating Commission, independent of the Sino-Macanese elite, to exercise control of movement. Armed conflicts intensified in May, June, and mainly in July, when the Chinese authorities unilaterally imposed a blockade on commercial, land, river, and sea communications between Macau and mainland China. This blockade caused a major shortage of basic goods, mainly food, in Macau.

In August, after intense negotiations through local diplomatic intermediaries, the authorities in Macau and mainland China were able to resolve the incident. These diplomatic intermediaries were members of the local Sino-Macanese elite, among whom Ho Yin, Ma Man-kei, and Pedro José Lobo stood out. In fact, it was Pedro Lobo who managed to resolve the impasse of the negotiations, by suggesting offering his personal regret for the incident, thus not compromising the Portuguese administration of Macau. In August 1952, Lobo eventually signed a written apology on behalf of the Portuguese administration in Zhuhai and provided compensation for the Chinese casualties. The resolution of the incident allowed the People's Republic of China to continue to use Macau as a gateway for necessary and strategic goods prohibited by the Western embargo. According to Portuguese historian Moisés Silva Fernandes, the increased status that Pedro José Lobo and Ho Yin came to enjoy after the incident allowed them to prevent, during the next ten years, any increase in taxes and fees on the gold monopoly previously granted to Pedro Lobo and Ho Yin by the Government of Macau.

Pedro Lobo's importance was also revealed in the great influence he had on the newly created Trade Coordinating Commission, which was supposed to be theoretically independent from the local elite. In fact, before the incident Governor Esparteiro had secretly ordered the commission to "maintain an intimate collaboration" with Pedro Lobo, because he "has extensive experience in the matter and [his] indications and advice can be very useful", this support being "indispensable for the smooth running of the work under the responsibility of the Commission".

=== Culture and arts ===
Being a great lover of culture and especially music, Pedro Lobo directed operettas and wrote several musical works, some of which were praised by the Musical Academy of Lisbon. His musical compositions were grouped into several albums. One of his most important and famous compositions was an operetta in three acts, called "Cruel Separation", first presented to the public in 1950/1951.

In 1950, Pedro Lobo founded the Cultural Circle of Macau (CCM), which aimed to "promote the dissemination of artistic-literary culture, especially Portuguese [...] and make Macau, under all its multiple aspects, better and more perfectly known in the Metropolis, in the other Portuguese colonies, and in all parts of the world where the mother tongue" is spoken. Among other things, the CCM published the cultural magazine "Mosaico", written in Portuguese, Chinese and English. The main contributors to "Mosaico" were Graciette Batalha, Father Fernando Herberto Maciel, Henrique de Senna Fernandes, José Silveira Machado, Luís Gonzaga Gomes, Captain Pimentel Bastos, Lígia Pinto Ribeiro and António Nolasco. Basically, the various activities sponsored and organized by the CCM marked and enriched Macau's cultural life in the 1950s.
