= Sidney Gordon (businessman) =

The Honourable Sir Sidney Gordon GBE CBE JP

Chairman of the China Light and Power
- In office 1992–1996
- Preceded by: Lawrence Kadoorie
- Succeeded by: Michael Kadoorie

Personal details
- Born: Sidney Samuel Gordon; 20 August 1917 Glasgow, Scotland
- Died: 11 April 2007 (aged 89) Happy Valley, Hong Kong
- Spouse: Olive Eldon (m. 1950; died 1992)
- Children: Fiona Jane Lamb; Carolyn Mary Mitchell

Sir Sidney Gordon GBE CBE JP (20 August 1917 – 11 April 2007) was a businessman in colonial Hong Kong from 1956 until his death in 2007.

== Life in Scotland ==
Sidney Samuel Gordon was born in Glasgow, Scotland, and was the son of the managing director of British Lion Films in Scotland. In his early life he suffered from chronic ill health and was diagnosed with pleurisy as a child. This tendency towards sickness meant that Sidney, unlike his brother Leslie, never saw action during World War II. However, due to the experience he had accumulated in the Scottish accounting industry he was asked to work in the United Kingdom's biggest munitions factory at Ardeer in Ayrshire.

It was while working as an accountant here that Sidney was offered a position with Lowe, Bingham and Thomsons (which later became Lowe, Bingham and Mathews, and later PricewaterhouseCoopers) in Hong Kong. Sidney accepted this position in 1947, and by 1956 had become a senior partner at the firm.

He died on 11 April 2007, aged 89, in Hong Kong Adventist Hospital – Stubbs Road, Happy Valley, Hong Kong.

== Life in Hong Kong ==
As a senior partner in Lowe, Bingham and Matthews, Gordon became the primary accountant to Sir Elly Kadoorie and Sons, the corporate major shareholder in such companies as Hong Kong and Shanghai Hotels group, China Light and Power, and Tai Ping Carpets. Through this he developed a deep friendship with Lord Kadoorie and the Kadoorie family, and when he left Lowe Bingham and Matthews, he joined the Board of Directors of Sir Elly Kadoorie and Sons, eventually becoming the group's chairman.

Sidney Gordon was appointed a Commander of the Order of the British Empire (CBE) in 1967 and was knighted in 1972 for services to Hong Kong. He also received the Grand Bauhinia Medal in 1999, the highest award available to the Hong Kong government.

== Positions held ==
Organization	Position Held
Lowe, Bingham and Matthews Hong Kong (PricewaterhouseCoopers)	Senior Partner
The Royal Hong Kong Golf Club	President and Captain
The Royal Hong Kong Jockey Club	Senior Steward
Executive Council of Hong Kong, ExCo	Member; 1965–1980
Kadoorie Group, Sir Elly Kadoorie and Sons	Chairman
China Light and Power	Chairman
The Community Chest of Hong Kong	Co-Founder
Hong Kong and Shanghai Hotels group	Director and Chairman

Political offices
Preceded by Sir Yuet-keung Kan	Senior Unofficial Member of the Executive Council; March 1980 – August 1980	Succeeded by Sir Sze-yuen Chung
