= Chung Sze-yuen =

Hong Kong politician and industrialist

The Honourable Sir Sze-yuen Chung GBE, GBM, JP, FREng
- 鍾士元

Non-Official Convenor of Executive Council
- In office 1 July 1997 – 30 June 1999
- Appointed by: Tung Chee-hwa
- Succeeded by: Leung Chun-ying

Senior Member of the Executive Council
- In office August 1980 – 1 September 1988
- Appointed by: Sir Murray MacLehose
- Preceded by: Sir Yuet-keung Kan
- Succeeded by: Dame Lydia Dunn

Senior Member of the Legislative Council
- In office 1974 – August 1978
- Appointed by: Sir Murray MacLehose
- Preceded by: Woo Pak-chuen
- Succeeded by: Sir Oswald Cheung

Personal details
- Born: 3 November 1917 Victoria, Hong Kong
- Died: 14 November 2018 (aged 101) Kowloon City, Hong Kong
- Spouse: Cheung Yung-hing (m. 1942; died 1977)
- Children: 3
- Education: St. Paul's College; University of Hong Kong; University of Sheffield

Chung Sze-yuen
- Traditional Chinese: 鍾士元
- Simplified Chinese: 钟士元
Transcriptions
Standard Mandarin
- Hanyu Pinyin: Zhōng Shìyuán
Yue: Cantonese
- Yale Romanization: Jūng Sih-yùhn
- Jyutping: Zung^{1} Si^{6}-jyun^{4}

Sir Sze-yuen Chung, GBE, GBM, JP, FREng (Chinese: 鍾士元; 3 November 1917 – 14 November 2018), often known as Sir S.Y. Chung, was a Hong Kong politician and businessman who served as a Senior Member of the Executive and Legislative Councils during the 1970s and 1980s in the colonial period and the first non-official Convenor of the Executive Council in the SAR period. For his seniority in the Hong Kong political arena, he was nicknamed the "Great Sir" and "Godfather of Hong Kong politics".

An-engineer-turned-politician, Chung was appointed to various public positions by the colonial government including the chairman of the Federation of Hong Kong Industries (FHKI) in the 1960s before he was an Unofficial Member of the Legislative and Executive Councils. As a Senior Member of the Executive Council, Chung was involved heavily in the Sino-British negotiations on the Hong Kong sovereignty in the early 1980s, in which he sought to voice the concerns on the behalf of the Hong Kong people between the Chinese and British governments. After his retirement from the colonial positions in 1988, he began to take Beijing appointments of pre-handover posts. In 1997, he was invited by Chief Executive Tung Chee-hwa to become the first Convenor of the Non-official Members of the SAR Executive Council until his second retirement in 1999.

== Early life and education ==
Chung was born in British-ruled Hong Kong on 3 November 1917 with a family root of Fatshan, Guangdong. He was the eldest son of his father's third wife and the fifth of his eight sons. His father was an importing metal merchant. He attended the Anglo-Chinese schools including St. Paul's College and was a member of the St. John's Ambulance and lifesaver of the Royal Life Saving Society as a youth. After he graduated from St. Paul's College in 1936, he went to study engineering at St. John's University in Shanghai. However, he was cut off from Shanghai when it was invaded by the Japanese Empire in 1937 during his summer holidays. He went on obtained admission to the University of Hong Kong. In May 1941, he graduated with a first class honours Bachelor of Science degree in engineering.

He was soon hired by the Kowloon Whampoa Shipyard as an assistant engineer working in the machine shops at a monthly salary of 200 Hong Kong dollars. During the Battle of Hong Kong in December 1941, he joined the Auxiliary Transport Services (a unit under Hong Kong Police) and was dispatched to the Wanchai Vocation School to take charge of the motor car repair section.

== Wartime and business career ==
After the fall of Hong Kong, he left to the neutral Macau and later on to the Jiangxi Province to work with his university lecturer Tsang Wah-shing in the Taihe machine factory in early 1942, where he married his fiancée, Cheung Yung-hing. He was asked to set up another machine factory and became its general manager and also lectured as a part-time associate professor at the Chiang Kai-shek University. He was also in charge of designing a tea factory for the National Tea Corporation for export to Russia.

In 1944, when Jiangxi fell under the Japanese hand, he joined the exodus to a small town near Xingquo and worked in a machine factory for making textile equipment. After the liberation, he was appointed plant manager of the electric power plant cum water works in Nanchang but soon resigned and returned to Hong Kong. He worked as a chief engineer for his friend's family business of World Light Manufactory before he further his study in the United Kingdom in the late summer of 1948. He received a doctoral degree in Engineering Science from the University of Sheffield in 1951. He published an article on deep drawing of sheet metal which won the Whitworth Prize of the Institution of Mechanical Engineers in London in 1952. He worked as a research officer for the GKN after graduation but he decided to return to Hong Kong at the end of 1951.

Chung reassumed his position at the World Light Manufactory as its chief engineer and later deputy general manager. After the closedown of the factory, he started his own engineering consulting business in 1953 before he became the general manager of the V. K. Song Limited which produced flashlights and later renamed into Sonca Industries Limited in which he was the executive chairman of the board.

== Early public career ==
Chung was appointed to be the working party of establishing an industrial association by Governor Robert Black in 1958, which later became the Federation of Hong Kong Industries (FHKI) in 1960. In 1966 when Sir Chau Sik-nin became chairman of the newly founded Hong Kong Trade Development Council (TDC), Chung succeeded Chau to be the chairman of the Federation. He was also appointed to be a provisional member of the Legislative Council by Governor Sir David Trench in April 1965, as well as member of the Trade and Industry Advisory Board, Hong Kong Telephone Advisory Committee, Hong Kong Aviation Advisory Board, Hong Kong Government Radiation Board, Working Committee on Productivity and a Justice of the Peace.

In 1968, Chung became the permanent member of the Legislative Council and was appointed to the Executive Council by Governor Sir Murray MacLehose in 1972. In 1974 Chung became the Senior Member of the Legislative Council. In order to explore the Hong Kong's prospects after the expiry of the New Territories Land Lease in 1997, an Advisory Committee headed by Financial Secretary Sir Philip Haddon-Cave was set up in 1977 in which Chung was also a member. In 1980, the Advisory Committee submitted a four-page letter to the Governor to ask for the government to begin preliminary negotiations on the subject of sovereignty.

== Executive Council Senior Member ==
In 1978, Chung resigned from the Legislative Council to devote more time in the Executive Council. He was also appointed a Knight Bachelor in 1978. After Senior Member of the Executive Council Sir Yuet-keung Kan and Sir Sidney Gordon both retired in August 1980, Sir S.Y. Chung became the Senior Member, the highest representative position in the government and the "leader of the Hong Kong community".

=== Question of Hong Kong prospects ===
During his service as the Senior Member of the Executive Council, he witnessed the negotiations of the British and Chinese governments over the sovereignty of Hong Kong. Before the beginning of the negotiations, he was invited to sit in the Chinese People's Political Consultative Conference (CPPCC) in which he declined the offer as he saw it would be a betrayal to the British government. In September 1982, the Unofficial Members of the Executive and Legislative Councils (UMELCO) headed by Chung sent a five-member delegation to London with Roger Lobo, Li Fook-wo, Lydia Dunn and Chan Kam-chuen to meet with Prime Minister Margaret Thatcher over the 1997 issue to suggest the status quo of British administration in Hong Kong.

He met with Thatcher and urged the British government to trust the Executive Council after The Observer revealed the Beijing position on Hong Kong in which the Executive Council was not notified after her Beijing visit in December 1982. However, the "three-legged stool" proposal of the Hong Kong representatives besides the British and Chinese sides on the negotiation table was not realised as the UMELCO were excluded from Sino-British talks in 1983.

The Unofficial Members of the Executive Council (UMEXCO) sent two missions to London to voice their opinions to the British government in July and October 1983, in which in the second mission Chung was told by Thatcher that a compromise had to be reached. In December, Governor Edward Youde told the UMELCO that Britain had decided to return the sovereignty and administration of Hong Kong to China on 1 July 1997 but was not known to the public until 20 April 1984. In response, the UMELCO met on 24 February 1984 which came up with a strategy to mobilise public opinion on the Sino-British agreement and make known Hong Kong's views to the British and Hong Kong governments. Senior Member of the Legislative Council Roger Lobo proposed a motion on 14 March to request "any proposal for the future of Hong Kong should be debated in this council before any final agreement is reached."

=== Sino-British Joint Declaration ===
After Foreign Secretary Sir Geoffrey Howe announced that Britain would withdraw from Hong Kong on 1 July 1997, UMELCO believed it was vital that a Sino-British agreement acceptable to the majority of Hong Kong people be reached so as to ensure the prosperity, stability and liberty of Hong Kong as set out in UMELCO's position paper of May 1984. Armed with the position paper's six concerns, two questions and four requests on the agreement, UMELCO's members flew to London but were snubbed by Members of Parliament, former Prime Minister Edward Heath and former Hong Kong Governor Sir Murray MacLehose. Howe said the UMELCO delegation did not represent the Hong Kong people as its members were not elected. Heath even said "these unofficial members, appointed by the governor, do not represent the people of Hong Kong. They never have done and they never will." Stung by this humiliation, Chun urged the Hong Kong people to submit their opinions on the agreement as the delegation exited the parliament surrounded by reporters. The UMELCO office subsequently received close to 10,000 messages of support, while a survey showed that about 70 to 90 per cent of Hong Kong residents supported UMELCO's position paper.

In June 1984, Chung headed a three-member delegation, including Lydia Dunn and Lee Quo-wei, to meet with Deng Xiaoping in Beijing. At the meeting, Deng dismissed the idea of a "three-legged stool" negotiation with Hong Kong representatives and insisted on China's sovereignty over Hong Kong in 1997.

Chung voiced the concerns of the Hong Kong people regarding Hong Kong's future and the potential exodus of professionals, talent and capital, which would result in an economic recession. He also expressed concerns over China's policy on Hong Kong after 1997. In response, Deng said there would be a Joint Liaison Group set up in the transition period and assured him that Hong Kong people would run Hong Kong after 1997. After returning from Beijing, Chung said in a press conference that Chairman Deng did not believe there was a crisis of confidence in Hong Kong. The remarks attracted scorn from the Director of the New China News Agency (NCNA) Xu Jiatun, who described them as "ministers falling from grace" of the British.

After the fifth and final UMEXCO mission to London in September 1984, during which its members were briefed on the details of the agreement, UMEXCO publicly endorsed the proposed Sino-British Joint Declaration, believing that it fulfilled the demands set out in UMELCO's position paper. In December, Chung was invited to witness the signing of the Sino-British Joint Declaration. For his contributions during the negotiations, he was awarded Knight Grand Cross of the Most Excellent Order of the British Empire (GBE) after his retirement in 1989.

=== Post-agreement period ===
Chung and Dunn turned down an invitation from Beijing to sit on the Hong Kong Basic Law Consultative Committee (BLCC) to draft the Basic Law of Hong Kong as it would undermine their positions as the Senior Members of the Executive and Legislative Councils. However, Chung maintained close ties with Xu Jiatun in the ensuing years on the issues of the implementation of the Sino-British Joint Declaration and democratic development in Hong Kong. On 1 September 1988, Chung stepped down from the Executive Council and retired from politics.

Chung was also chairman of the Hong Kong Japan Business Cooperation Committee from 1983 to 1988 and the Hong Kong US Economic Cooperation Committee from 1984 1988. He was involved in the establishment of three local universities, as the founding chairman of the Council of the Hong Kong Polytechnic in 1972 and was responsible for the establishment of the City Polytechnic in 1984. He oversaw the establishment of the Hong Kong University of Science and Technology (HKUST) in 1991 as the chairman of the planning committee and became its pro-chancellor.

== Post-Exco career ==
Chung remained influential after his retirement. During the Tiananmen Square protests of 1989, Chung urged Governor Sir David Wilson not to abandon the government's long-held policy of neutrality towards China. In 1990, he became a member of the Advisory Council of the Business and Professionals Federation of Hong Kong (BPF), a pro-business conservative political group that grew out of the Group of 89. Chung also advised his protege, Senior Member of the Legislative Council Allen Lee, and Steven Poon, to abandon any pretense of being above politics and form a proper political party with its belief, vision, discipline and platform to counter the emergence of the populist United Democrats of Hong Kong (UDHK) following the first Legislative Council election in 1991. Lee later transformed the think tank Co-operative Resources Centre (CRC), consisting of appointed Legislative Council members, into the Liberal Party in 1993. Chung was also appointed chairman of the Hong Kong Hospital Authority and was closely involved with its establishment in 1991.

In 1992, Chung accepted the Beijing government's invitation to be a Hong Kong Affairs Advisor to give advice to the Beijing government on various matters in Hong Kong. In 1993, he was appointed to the Preliminary Working Committee (PWC) to prepare for the transfer of Hong Kong's sovereignty. In the committee, he was the convenor of the Economics sub-group on the new airport which became a contentious issue between the British and Chinese governments. In 1995, he was appointed to the Preparatory Committee for the Hong Kong Special Administrative Region. He went on become one of the 400-member Selection Committee that was responsible for electing the Provisional Legislative Council and the first Chief Executive.

On 24 January 1997, Chief Executive-elect Tung Chee-hwa announced the membership of the first SAR Executive Council, in which Chung became the convenor of the non-official members of the Executive Council. He received the Grand Bauhinia Medal on 1 July 1997, the first day of the new Hong Kong Special Administrative Region. He served in the council for two more years and retired from all official capacities on 30 June 1999.

In 2001, he published a memoir, Hong Kong's Journey to Reunification: Memoirs of Sze-yuen Chung which covered his life, career and extensive involvement in the Sino-British negotiations in the 1980s.

== Personal life ==
Chung was a keen volleyball player and played for his school, the St. Paul's College. He was also the vice-captain of the Hong Kong team in the Shanghai national volleyball tournament in 1948. He married Cheung Yung-hing in 1942 and had two daughters and one son. He died on 14 November 2018, shortly after his 101st birthday.

== Honours ==
- Officer of the Most Excellent Order of the British Empire (OBE) (1968)
- Commander of the Most Excellent Order of the British Empire (CBE) (1975)
- Order of the Sacred Treasure (Japan) (1977)
- Knight Bachelor (1978)
- Fellow of the Royal Academy of Engineering (FREng) (1983)
- Knight Grand Cross of the Most Excellent Order of the British Empire (GBE) (1989)
- Recipient of the Grand Bauhinia Medal (GBM) (1997)

== Bibliography ==
- Chung, Sze Yuen (2001). Hong Kong's Journey to Reunification: Memoirs of Sze-yuen Chung. Chinese University Press. ISBN 9629960028.
- Pepper, Suzanne (2008). Keeping Democracy at Bay: Hong Kong and the Challenge of Chinese Political Reform. Rowman & Littlefield. ISBN 978-0742508774.

Business positions
Preceded by Sir Chau Sik-nin	Chairman of Federation of Hong Kong Industries; 1966–1970	Succeeded by Ann Tse-kai
Legislative Council of Hong Kong
Preceded by Woo Pak-chuen	Senior Chinese Unofficial Member; 1974–1978	Succeeded by Oswald Cheung
Preceded by Woo Pak-chuen	Senior Unofficial Member; 1974–1978	Succeeded by Oswald Cheung
Political offices
Preceded by Sir Chau Sik-nin	Chairman of Hong Kong Productivity Council; 1974–1976	Succeeded by Chen Shou-lum
Preceded by Sir Sidney Gordon	Senior Unofficial Member of Executive Council; 1980–1985	Succeeded by Himself as Senior Member of Executive Council
Preceded by Sir Kan Yuet-keung	Senior Chinese Unofficial Member of Executive Council; 1980–1988	Succeeded by Dame Lydia Dunn
Preceded by Himself as Senior Unofficial Member of the Executive Council	Senior Member of the Executive Council; 1985–1988	Succeeded by Dame Lydia Dunn
New title	Chairman of Hospital Authority; 1990–1995	Succeeded by Peter Woo
Preceded by Rosanna Wong as Senior Member of the Executive Council	Non-Official Convenor of Executive Council; 1997–1999	Succeeded by Leung Chun-ying
