= Monument in Commemoration of the Return of Hong Kong to China =

Monument in Wan Chai North, Hong Kong

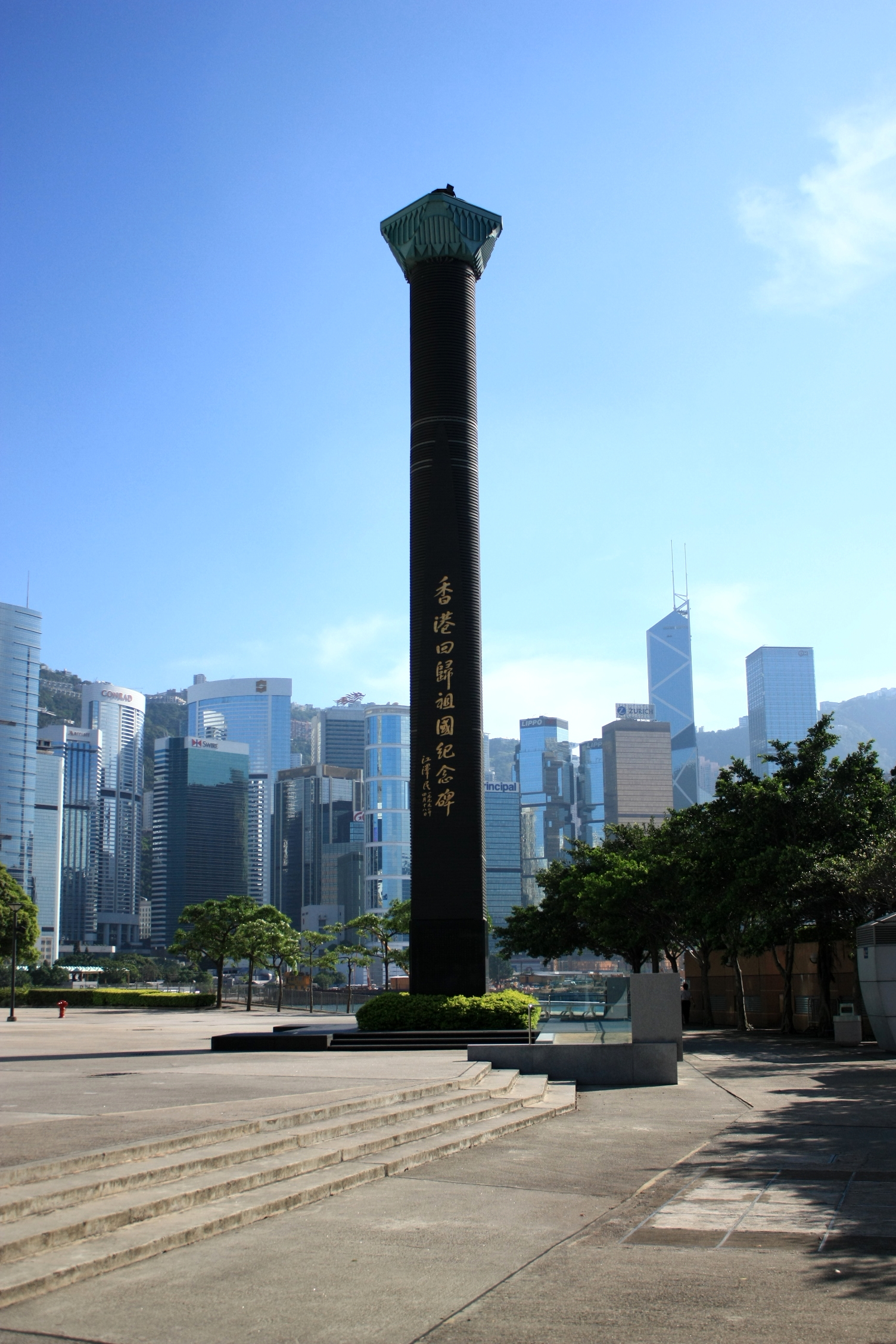
- The monument in 2009
- Interactive map of Monument in Commemoration of the Return of Hong Kong to China
- Location: Wan Chai, Hong Kong
- Coordinates: 22°17′4.3″N 114°10′20.6″E
- Opening date: July 1,1999
- Dedicated date: July 1,1999

The Monument in Commemoration of the Return of Hong Kong to China is an outdoor monument, installed in Golden Bauhinia Square, Wan Chai North, Hong Kong.

The monument was unveiled on July 1, 1999, by Hu Jintao, then a member of the Standing Committee of the Political Bureau of the CPC Central Committee and Vice President of China, and Tung Chee-hwa, Chief Executive of Hong Kong, to celebrate the second anniversary of Hong Kong's return to China.

The monument is 20 meters high and 1.6 meters wide, consisting of three parts: a base, a shaft, and a top. The base and shaft are constructed of granite, while the top is cast in bronze. The pillar is composed of 206 stone rings, representing the years from 1842 to 2047. Six of these rings are light-colored, representing significant years in Hong Kong's history, including:

1842: The Treaty of Nanjing was signed between China and Britain; Hong Kong Island was ceded.

1860: The Treaty of Beijing was signed between China and Britain; Kowloon was ceded.

1898: The Convention for the Extension of Hong Kong Territory was signed between China and Britain; the New Territories were leased.

1982: China and Britain held talks on the future of Hong Kong.

1984: The Sino- British Joint Declaration was signed.

1990: The National People's Congress formally promulgated the Basic Law of Hong Kong.

To highlight the importance of Hong Kong's return to China, the following years' Shek Wan stones are inlaid with a halo containing 32 fiber optic points:

1997: Hong Kong's sovereignty was transferred to the People's Republic of China.

== See also ==
- Transfer of sovereignty over Hong Kong
