= Radio Vilaverde Lda =

Rádio Vilaverde 綠邨電台
- Macau; China
- Broadcast area: Macau
- Frequency: 99.5 MHz

Programming
- Format: Music, Sports

Ownership
- Owner: Rádio Vilaverde Lda.

History
- First air date: 1950
- Former call signs: CR9XL/CR9XM (1950-2015)

Links
- Webcast: Listen live

Founded by legendary Macau business figure Pedro José Lobo, Rádio Vilaverde Lda. (Chinese: 綠邨電台) originally operated from his home of the same name in the northern part of the city and is now a Macau-based radio station serving Macau and nearby Chinese cities such as Hong Kong, as well as Zhuhai and Shenzhen in Guangdong Province. Currently located at Macau Jockey Club complex, it broadcasts at FM 99.5. It has live broadcast of horse racing in Macau. But in 2012, the radio was only broadcasting online because the transmitter on the Jockey Club was damaged by a tropical storm. In 2015, The AM frequency 738 ceased to operate and has since been replaced by FM frequency 99.5. As 2017, the radio only airs music around the clock.

In 2017, the radio starts their online platform for sharing music and journals in Macau.

== See also ==
- Media of Macau
