= Lotus Square =

Square in Macau

Coordinates: 22°11′39.84″N 113°33′11.78″E

Chinese name
- Traditional Chinese: 金蓮花廣場
- Simplified Chinese: 金莲花广场
- Literal meaning: Golden Lotus Square
Transcriptions
Standard Mandarin
- Hanyu Pinyin: Jīnliánhuā Guǎngchǎng
Yue: Cantonese
- Jyutping: gam1 lin4 faa1 gwong2 coeng4

Portuguese name
- Portuguese: Praça Flor de Lodão

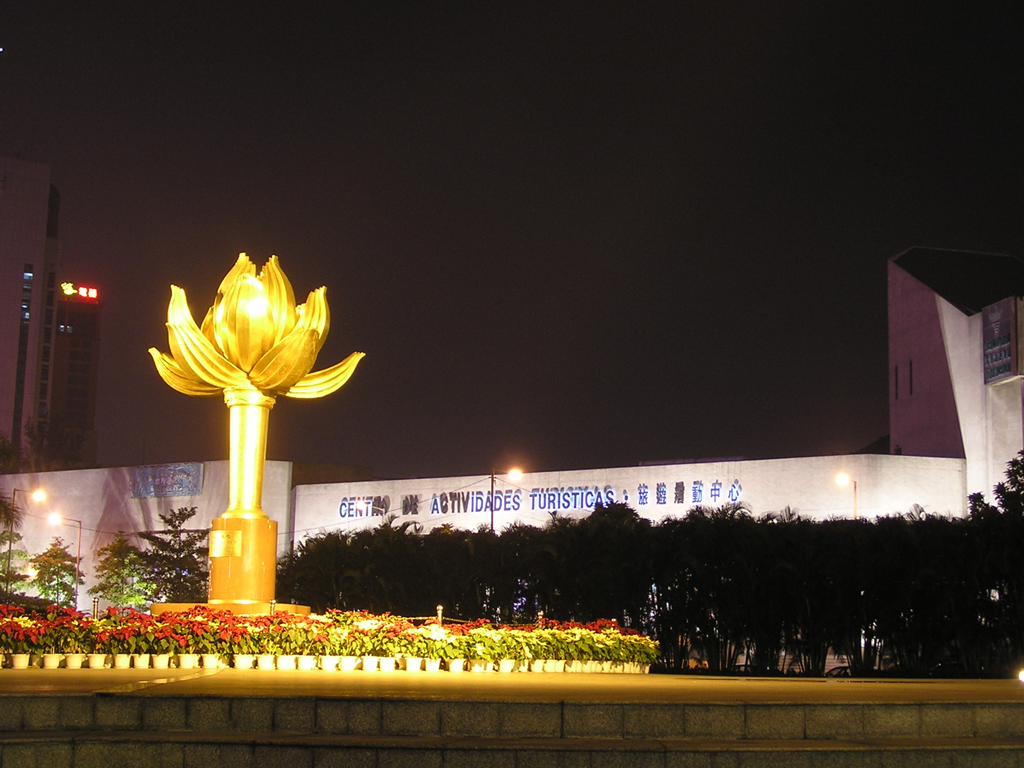
The large sculpture Lotus Flower In Full Bloom at Lotus Square, with the Tourist Activity Centre in the background.

The Lotus Square or Golden Lotus Square (Chinese: 金蓮花廣場; Jyutping: gam1lin4faa1 gwong2coeng4; Portuguese: Praça Flor de Lodão) is an open square in Sé, Macau, China. The area features the large bronze sculpture Lotus Flower In Full Bloom (Chinese: 盛世蓮花; Jyutping: sing6sai3lin4faa1) and is somewhat akin to the Golden Bauhinia of neighbouring Hong Kong.

== Description ==
The sculpture, representing a flower of Nelumbo nucifera, is made of gilded bronze, weighs 6.5 tonnes, is 6 metres high and 3.6 metres wide. The major part of the flower has 16 parts, including the stem, petals and pistil. The base consists of 23 pieces of red granite in three layers and in the shape of lotus leaves. These signify the three main parts of the territory: Macau Peninsula, Taipa Island and Coloane Island.

The lotus flower in full bloom symbolises the everlasting prosperity of Macau. The sculpture was presented by the State Council of the People's Republic of China in 1999 to mark the handover of Macau from Portugal to China. Lotus Square today is popular with skateboarders because of its abundance of ledges, curbs and stairs.

== See also ==
- Golden Bauhinia Square, Hong Kong
