= Harry Fang =

The Honourable Sir Harry Fang GBM, CBE, JP

Senior Chinese Unofficial Member
- In office 1981–1985
- Preceded by: Oswald Cheung
- Succeeded by: Lydia Dunn, Baroness Dunn

Personal details
- Born: 2 August 1923 Nanking, Republic of China
- Died: 24 August 2009 (aged 86) Hong Kong
- Spouse: Lady Laura Fang (Yip Hung-cha) (m. 10 July 1948 – 24 August 2009)
- Relations: Fang Zhenwu (father); Guo Yukun (mother); Anson Chan (niece); Christine Fang (daughter)
- Children: 6

Sir Harry Fang Sin-yang, GBM, CBE, JP (Chinese: 方心讓, 2 August 1923 – 24 August 2009) was a Hong Kong orthopaedic surgeon, legislator and campaigner who promoted rehabilitation services. He was widely known as the "father of rehabilitation" in Asia. A well-known humanitarian, Harry Fang championed the rights of the disabled and disadvantaged. He co-founded the Hong Kong Society for Rehabilitation, and headed the Rehabilitation International for a period of time. In 2009, he died from complications of a stroke.

== Biography ==
Fang was born in Nanking in August 1923. Fang's family moved to Shanghai in 1931 and then moved to Hong Kong in 1938. He received his secondary education at the King's College, Hong Kong, and his degree of medicine from the University of Hong Kong. He then specialized in orthopedics and quickly became an orthopedic surgeon.

Throughout the latter half of the twentieth century, Fang became known as a powerful legislator in Hong Kong. He was a Member of the Legislative Council of Hong Kong from 1974 to 1985. From 1979 to 1983, he was a member of the Executive Council of Hong Kong. In both of these offices, he campaigned for the rights of disabled people and for rehabilitation.

In 2009, Fang died of complications from a stroke.
