= Education Commission =

Education organisation that advises the Hong Kong government

- Formation: 1984
- Purpose: Advisory
- Headquarters: Hong Kong
- Website: Official website

The Education Commission of Hong Kong is a body established to advise the government on the overall development of education in the light of the community's needs. The body was established in 1984.
