= Hong Kong mainland China driving scheme =

Cross-border vehicle transit initiative

The Hong Kong mainland China driving scheme (Chinese: 自駕遊計畫) is a cross-border driving scheme which allows drivers of cars with primary registration in mainland China to drive directly to Hong Kong. Currently, mainland cars have the driver seat on the left, while HK cars have driver seat on the right. Historically HK was a British colony before 1997, and adopted driving on the same side of the road as the United Kingdom.

Prior to the introduction of this pilot scheme, Hong Kong vehicles have to apply for PRC's registration number plates to cross the border, and vice versa.

== Timeline ==
The first phase of the scheme begins on 1 March 2012. It allows 50 private vehicles from HK to travel to Guangdong province on the mainland.

In the second phase, cars from the mainland will be allowed to enter Hong Kong. 50 mainland cars will be allowed to enter Hong Kong every day from the mainland, seven days a week. There cannot be a total of more than 350 mainland cars in the city. The 350 cars limit is expected to increase to 500 in the future.

== Opposition ==
=== Initial reaction ===
On 7 February 2012, the Civic Party launched a signature-collection drive in Wan Chai to see if people were against the new driving scheme. In just 90 minutes, over 1,200 signatures were collected in opposition to mainland drivers coming to Hong Kong. About 40,000 Facebook users were against the scheme. Legislative council member Tam Yiu-chung of the pro-Beijing Democratic Alliance for the Betterment and Progress of Hong Kong is a supporter of the new policy. There were plans earlier by the Hong Kong government to control air pollution and reduce car counts in the city. This scheme seems to contradict the government's own plan.

=== 12 February protest ===
On 12 February 2012, about 300 people protested against the scheme. Transport secretary Eva Cheng tried to calm the local citizens by saying it was "just a trial scheme". This event has been tied to Kong Qingdong's comment about Hong Kong citizens being the British running dog during the Early 2012 Hong Kong protests.

=== 19 February protest ===
On 19 February 2012, about 1600 people protested in HK against the arrival of mainland drivers. About 22 non-government organisations participated. Some nicknames given to the protest including: "suicide travel" (自殺遊) and "despicable travel" (賤格遊). The protest asked Hong Kong drivers not to fill out any application to drive north into China. Doing so will be accepting the scheme thus betraying fellow Hong Kong citizens. The march started from Causeway Bay.

Also about 10 members of the pro-Beijing camp Liberal Party led by Miriam Lau have taken part in a small protest at the Legislative Council Complex against the second phase of the scheme. She said there are currently far too many cars that want to travel south (from the mainland to Hong Kong), and there are liability problems. She wants to consider cancelling the second phase.

== See also ==
- Chinese unification
- One country, two systems
- China National Highway 110 traffic jam
