= Roger Lobo =

British Hong Kong businessman (1923–2015)

The Honourable Sir Rogério Lobo CBE, JP

Unofficial Member of the Executive Council of Hong Kong
- In office 1967–1985

Member of the Legislative Council of Hong Kong
- In office 1972–1985

Chairman of the Hong Kong Broadcasting Authority
- In office 1989–1997
- Succeeded by: Norman Leung

Personal details
- Born: 15 September 1923 Macau
- Died: 18 April 2015 (aged 91) Hong Kong
- Spouse: Margaret Mary Choa
- Children: Branca Elena Lobo Rogério Arnaldo Lobo; Orlando Manuel Lobo; Margaret Rosalyn Lobo; Luis Pedro Jose Lobo; Marco Alberto Maria Lobo; Maria Isabel Lobo; Marilyn Anne Lobo; Alfredo Paulo Lobo Maria Theresa Lobo
- Parent(s): Pedro Jose Lobo; Branca Helena Hyndman

Sir Rogério Hyndman Lobo, CBE, JP (15 September 1923 – 18 April 2015), generally known as Roger Lobo, was a British Hong Kong businessman, philanthropist and politician.

He was a member of the Urban Council, Executive Council and Legislative Council. He was famous for his Lobo Motion in Legislative Council of Hong Kong during the negotiation of the future of Hong Kong between the United Kingdom and the PRC in early 1980s.

== Early life ==
Lobo was born in September 1923 of Hong Kong-Macanese, Portuguese and Scottish descent. His father, Pedro José Lobo, had moved from Portuguese Timor to Macau between late 19th century and early 20th century. He settled in Macau and married Branca Hyndman, the great-granddaughter of Scottish-born Colonel Henry Hyndman, who served in the British East India Company at Bengal and whose son Henrique settled in Macau either in the late 18th or early 19th century. Pedro José Lobo was a famous and important businessman, politician and philanthropist of Macau. He studied in the Lyceum in Macau and La Salle College in Hong Kong. After his study, Lobo joined his father's business in 1945.

== Political life ==
Lobo was appointed as a member of the Urban Council on 1 April 1965. He was a member of the Executive Council between 1967 and 1985, the Legislative Council between 1972 and 1985 (the Senior Unofficial Member between 1980 and 1985) and the Urban Council between 1965 and 1978.

On 14 March 1984, Lobo tabled the famous Lobo Motion in the Legislative Council:

This Council deems it essential that any proposals for the future of Hong Kong should be debated in this Council before any final agreement is reached

== Other public services ==
Lobo participated in many public services in Hong Kong, including the Civil Aid Service, of which he became the commissioner in 1977, and was also appointed as the head of Hong Kong Broadcasting Authority.

== Personal life ==
Rogério Lobo married Margaret Mary Choa; they had five sons and five daughters, as well as 28 grandchildren and 17 great-grandchildren.

== Honours and awards ==
Lobo was appointed an Officer of the Most Excellent Order of the British Empire (OBE) in 1972 and a Commander of the Most Excellent Order of the British Empire (CBE) in 1978. He was knighted as a Knight Bachelor in 1984.

He was awarded the degree of Doctor of Laws honoris causa by The University of Hong Kong in 1982.

== Sources ==
- Urban Council, Urban Council Annual Report, 1974
- Forjaz, Jorge. Familias Macaenses. Macau: Instituto Portugues do Oriente, 1996; ISBN 972-9440-60-3.
