= 1973 Birthday Honours =

British government recognitions

The Queen's Birthday Honours 1973 were appointments in many of the Commonwealth realms of Queen Elizabeth II to various orders and honours to reward and highlight good works by citizens of those countries. They were published on 2 June 1973 for the United Kingdom, New Zealand, Mauritius, and Fiji.

The recipients of honours are displayed here as they were styled before their new honour, and arranged by honour, with classes (Knight, Knight Grand Cross, etc.) and then divisions (Military, Civil, etc.) as appropriate.

== United Kingdom and Colonies ==
=== Privy Councillor ===
- Ian Hedworth John Little Gilmour, MP, Minister of State for Defence.
- Charles Patrick Fleeming Jenkin, MP, Chief Secretary, Treasury.

=== Knight Bachelor ===
- Geoffrey William Gerald Agnew. For services to Art.
- Stephen France Burman, CBE. For services to the University of Birmingham.
- Maurice Fletcher Coop. For political and public services in London and the Midlands.
- Alfred Rupert Neale Cross, FBA, Vinerian Professor of English Law, University of Oxford.
- Peter Lauderdale Daubeny, CBE. For services to the Theatre.
- Herbert John Salisbury Dewes, CBE, DL, Chairman, Cheshire County Council.
- James Fyfe Falconer, MBE, Town Clerk, Glasgow.
- Professor Raymond William Firth, FBA, Anthropologist.
- Colonel Alastair Stewart Durward Graesser, DSO, OBE, MC, TD. For public services in Wales.
- Keith Granville, CBE, Deputy Chairman, British Airways Board.
- John Archibald Browne Gray, FRS, Secretary, Medical Research Council.
- Anthony Charles Grover, Chairman, Lloyd's Register of Shipping.
- John Hall, OBE, MP. For political and public services.
- Charles Collier Johnston, TD. For political and public services in the North West.
- Andrew Watt Kay, Regius Professor of Surgery, University of Glasgow.
- Percy Edward Kent, FRS. For services to petroleum exploration.
- Henry Lumby, CBE, DL, Chairman, Lancashire County Council.
- Donald James Dundas Maitland, CMG, OBE, Chief Press Secretary, 10 Downing Street.
- James Woodham Menter, FRS, Director of Research & Development, Tube Investments Ltd.
- Ian Thomas Morrow, Deputy Chairman, Rolls-Royce (1971) Ltd.
- George Chester Ogden, CBE, DL, Town Clerk, Manchester City Council.
- Thomas Angus Lyall Paton, CMG, FRS, Senior Partner, Sir Alexander Gibb & Partners.
- Charles Henry Plumb, President, National Farmers' Union.
- Frederick Lincoln Ralphs. For services to Education.
- Alderman Herbert Redfearn. For political and public services in Yorkshire.
- Professor Eric Frank Scowen, Chairman, Committee on Safety of Medicines.
- David Arnold Solomon, MBE, Chairman, Liverpool Regional Hospital Board.
- Lieutenant-Commander Godfrey William Style, CBE, DSC, RN, Chairman, National Advisory Council on the Employment of the Disabled, for services to disabled people.
- Henry John Lester Suffield, Head of Defence Sales, Ministry of Defence.
- John Dudley Robert Tarleton Tilney, TD, MP. For political and public services.
- Tobias Rushton Weaver, CB, Deputy Secretary, Department of Education & Science.
- Colonel Joseph William Weld, OBE, TD. For public services in Dorset.
- Ernest Woodroofe, Chairman, Unilever Ltd.

==== Diplomatic Service & Overseas List ====
- The Honourable Mr. Justice William Alexander Blair-Kerr, Senior Puisne Judge, Hong Kong.
- The Honourable Milo Boughton Butler. For public services in the Bahama Islands.
- Mr. Justice Michael Herbert Frank Holden, CBE, ED, Chief Justice, Rivers State, Nigeria.
- The Honourable Mr. Justice John Crampton Summerfield, CBE, QC, Chief Justice, Bermuda.

==== Australian States ====
===== State of New South Wales =====
- Tristan Venus Antico. For services to industry and the community.
- The Honourable Mr. Justice Alexander Craig Beattie. For services to the State.
- Leslie Joseph Hooker. For services to commerce and the community.
- Clyde David Allen Kennedy. For services to sport.
- George Proud. For services to the community.

===== State of Victoria =====
- The Honourable Raymond William Garrett, AFC, MLC, of Doncaster. For services in politics, civic affairs and defence.
- Clifton Vaughan Holland, of Brighton. For services to engineering.

===== State of Queensland =====
- William Guilford Allen, Snr., CBE, of Longreach. For services to the Queensland pastoral industry and the community.
- The Honourable Peter Roylance Delamothe, OBE, Agent-General for Queensland in London.
- Reginald Basil McAllister, CMG, CVO, of Herston. For outstanding services to Queensland and to charity and in fostering international relations.

=== Order of the Bath ===
==== Knight Grand Cross of the Order of the Bath (GCB) ====
===== Military Division =====
====== Army ======
- Lieutenant-General (local General) Sir Harry Craufurd Tuzo, KCB, OBE, MC, (94690), late Royal Regiment of Artillery, Colonel Commandant Royal Regiment of Artillery.

==== Knight Commander of the Order of the Bath (KCB) ====
===== Military Division =====
====== Royal Navy ======
- Lieutenant General Basil Ian Spencer Gourlay, OBE, MC.
- Vice Admiral John Rae McKaig, CBE.

====== Army ======
- Lieutenant-General David William Fraser, OBE, (184424), late Foot Guards.

====== Royal Air Force ======
- Air Marshal Denis Crowley-Milling, CBE, DSO, DFC.
- Acting Air Marshal John Alexander Carlisle Aiken, CB.

===== Civil Division =====
- Douglas Owen Henley, CB, Second Permanent Secretary, HM Treasury.
- John Joseph Benedict Hunt, CB, Second Permanent Secretary, Cabinet Office.
- Arthur William Peterson, CB, MVO, Permanent Under-Secretary of State, Home Office.
- Jack Leslie Rampton, CB, Second Permanent Secretary, Department of Trade & Industry.

==== Companion of the Order of the Bath (CB) ====
===== Military Division =====
====== Royal Navy ======
- Rear Admiral Michael Harold Griffin.
- Rear Admiral Peter George La Niece, CBE.
- Rear Admiral Ian Jaffery Lees-Spalding.
- Major General Robert Beverley Loudoun, OBE.
- The Venerable Chandos Clifford Hastings Mansel Morgan, QHC.
- Rear Admiral Harry Desmond Nixon, MVO.

====== Army ======
- Major General Robert Cyril Ford, CBE, (284433), late Royal Armoured Corps.
- Brigadier Sheila Anne Elizabeth Heaney, MBE, TD, Honorary ADC, (192854), Women's Royal Army Corps.
- Major General Mervyn Janes, MBE, (243497), late Royal Regiment of Artillery.
- Major General Leonard Thomas Herbert Phelps, OBE, (328216), late Royal Army Ordnance Corps.

====== Royal Air Force ======
- Air Vice-Marshal Cresswell Montagu Clementi, CBE.
- Air Vice-Marshal Herbert Durkin.
- Air Vice-Marshal Eric Donald Hills, CBE.
- Air Vice-Marshal Alexander McKay Sinclair Steedman, CBE, DFC.
- Group Captain The Honourable Peter Beckford Rutgers Vanneck, OBE, AFC, ADC, DL, Royal Auxiliary Air Force.

===== Civil Division =====
- John Elliott Aiken, Deputy Secretary, Ministry of Health & Social Services, Northern Ireland.
- Peter Robert Baldwin, Deputy Secretary, HM Treasury.
- Ewen Broadbent, CMG, Deputy Secretary, Ministry of Defence.
- James William Calder, OBE, HM Chief Inspector of Mines & Quarries, Department of Trade & Industry.
- William John Chalmers, CBE, Secretary and Director General, Commonwealth War Graves Commission.
- William John Charnley, Controller of Guided Weapons & Electronics, Ministry of Defence.
- George Edward Dudman, Legal Adviser, Department of Education & Science.
- John Garlick, Director General, Highways, Department of the Environment.
- Christopher Alfred Herbert, Principal Director, Ministry of Defence.
- William Alfred Hobbs, CBE, Chief Valuer, Board of Inland Revenue.
- James Hogarth, Under Secretary, Scottish Home & Health Department.
- James Littlewood, Director of Savings, Department for National Savings.
- Carrol Austin John Naish O'Sullivan, The Public Trustee.
- Richard Domville Poland, Under Secretary, Department of the Environment.
- Raymond Frederick Prosser, MC, Deputy Secretary, Department of Trade & Industry.
- Claud Richard Ross, Deputy Secretary, Central Policy Review Staff, Cabinet Office.
- Terence Rowland Frazer Skemp, Parliamentary Counsel.

====== Additional Member ======
- Philip Brian Cecil Moore, CMG, Deputy Private Secretary to The Queen.

=== Order of Saint Michael and Saint George ===
==== Knight Grand Cross of the Order of St Michael and St George (GCMG) ====
===== Diplomatic Service & Overseas List =====
- Sir Robert Stewart Crawford, KCMG, CVO, lately Deputy Under-Secretary of State, Foreign & Commonwealth Office.
- Sir Colin Tradescant Crowe, KCMG, Permanent Representative of the United Kingdom to the United Nations, New York.

==== Knight Commander of the Order of St Michael and St George (KCMG) ====
===== Diplomatic Service & Overseas List =====
- Arthur Antony Duff, CMG, CVO, DSO, DSC, British High Commissioner, Nairobi.
- Horace Phillips, CMG, HM Ambassador, Ankara.
- John Laurence Pumphrey, CMG, HM Ambassador, Islamabad.

==== Companion of the Order of St Michael and St George (CMG) ====
- Ralph Ingham Hallows, MBE, lately Adviser, Bank of England. For services to British interests in the Middle East.
- Nicolaas Basil Jacques Huijsman, Assistant Secretary, Foreign & Commonwealth Office (Overseas Development Administration).
- John William Purseglove. For services to the improvement of tropical agriculture.
- Grenfell William Totman, OBE, Controller of Finance, Commonwealth Development Corporation.
- Raymond Henry Willmott, Counsellor (Energy & Shipping), British Embassy, Washington.

===== Diplomatic Service & Overseas List =====
- Arthur Henry Brind, Acting British High Commissioner, Kampala.
- Derek Neilson Brinson, MC, Counsellor, Foreign and Commonwealth Office.
- John Kenneth Drinkall, HM Ambassador, Kabul.
- John Redvers Freeland, Counsellor (Legal Adviser), United Kingdom Mission to the United Nations, New York.
- Charles Philip Haddon-Cave, Financial Secretary, Hong Kong.
- John Henry Gladstone Leahy, Counsellor, Foreign and Commonwealth Office.
- John Stephen Longrigg, OBE, Counsellor, Foreign and Commonwealth Office.
- Donald Collin Cumyn Luddington, Secretary for Home Affairs, Hong Kong.
- James Ironside McGhie, Minister (Commercial & Economic), HM Embassy, Tokyo.
- Peter George Arthur Wakefield, lately Minister (Commercial & Economic), HM Embassy, Tokyo.

===== Australian States =====
====== State of New South Wales ======
- Arthur Frederick Deer. For services to commerce and the community.

====== State of Victoria ======
- Colonel Alfred Newcombe Kemsley, CBE, ED, of Brighton. For services to the Shrine of Remembrance and the community in peace and war.
- The Honourable Ivan Archie Swinburne, MLC, of Myrtleford. For services to politics and the community.

====== State of Queensland ======
- Alan Johnston Campbell, of Kenmore. For services in rural and associated fields of endeavour.

=== Royal Victorian Order ===
==== Knight Grand Cross of the Royal Victorian Order (GCVO) ====
- The Right Honourable Ralph Francis Alnwick, Baron Grey of Naunton, GCMG, KCVO, OBE.

==== Knight Commander of the Royal Victorian Order (KCVO) ====
- Oliver Nicholas Millar, CVO.
- The Right Reverend and Right Honourable Robert Wright Stopford, CBE, DD.

==== Commander of the Royal Victorian Order (CVO) ====
- Lieutenant-Colonel Simon Claud Michael Bland, MVO.
- Lieutenant-Commander Peter Richard Buckley, MVO, Royal Navy.
- Major-General Peter Bernard Gillett, CB, OBE.
- Ernest Geoffrey Parsons, CBE.
- The Reverend Roger Lewis Roberts.
- John Philip Strudwick, CBE.
- Charles George Robert Warner, MVO.
- Air Commodore Archie Little Winskill, CBE, DFC, Royal Air Force.

==== Member of the Royal Victorian Order, 4th class (MVO) ====
- Geraldine Margaret Cousland, MVO.
- Alistair Cumming Fraser.
- Commander Alfred Austin Lockyer, Royal Navy.
- Colonel William George McHardy, MBE, MC.
- Major Raymond MacLaran.
- Donald Morrison, MVO.

==== Member of the Royal Victorian Order, 5th class (MVO) ====
- Ronald Henry Aubery.
- Squadron Leader Edward Alfred Ball, Royal Air Force Volunteer Reserve (Retired).
- Squadron Leader Michael Collison Darby, Royal Air Force.
- Diana Olive Heald.
- Sydney Arthur Pollard.
- Henry David Skam.
- Kenneth Waite.
- Enid Mary Westwood.

==== Medal of the Royal Victorian Order (RVM) ====
===== In Silver =====
- 2739070 Sergeant Daniel Owen Bowen, Welsh Guards.
- Marjorie Dawson.
- Percy Amos John Godfrey.
- Frederick George Clifford William Hibbert.
- Herbert Edward Long.
- Chief Petty Officer Cook Cyril Thomas Marter, P/M868817E.
- Frederick William Mitchell.
- Mary O'Dwyer.
- William Edward Rowe.
- Stanley John Welch.
- David Tames Whincup.
- Robert Frederick Whitley.

=== Order of the British Empire ===
==== Knight Grand Cross of the Order of the British Empire (GBE) ====
===== Civil Division =====
- The Right Honourable George James, Baron Cole, lately Chairman, Rolls-Royce (1971) Ltd., for services to industry.
- The Right Honourable Alan Raymond, Baron Mais, OBE, TD, ERD, Lord Mayor of London.

==== Knight Commander of the Order of the British Empire (KBE) ====
===== Military Division =====
====== Army ======
- Lieutenant-General James Parlane Baird, QHP, MD, FRCP, (115469), late Royal Army Medical Corps.

====== Royal Air Force ======
- Acting Air Marshal Charles Norman Seton Pringle, CBE.

===== Civil Division =====
- Sir William Henry Arnold, CBE, Bailiff of Guernsey.
- Michael John Sinclair Clapham, President, Confederation of British Industry.
- Robin Victor Vanderfelt, OBE, Secretary-General, Commonwealth Parliamentary Association.

==== Dame Commander of the Order of the British Empire (DBE) ====
===== Civil Division =====
- Sylvia Crowe, CBE, Landscape Architect.
- Marjorie Williamson, Principal, Royal Holloway College, University of London.

==== Commander of the Order of the British Empire (CBE) ====
===== Military Division =====
====== Royal Navy ======
- Surgeon Captain William MacFarlane Davidson, OBE.
- Captain Dudley Thomas Goodhugh.
- Captain Alec Haines Little, ADC.
- Captain Leslie William Townsend.
- Commodore James Fortune Rose Weir, ADC.

====== Army ======
- Brigadier Paul Norman Davis (77622), Corps of Royal Military Police.
- Brigadier Peter Kismet Goozee (194876), late Royal Army Ordnance Corps.
- Colonel Sir David John Hughes-Morgan, Bt, MBE, (384230), Army Legal Services Staff.
- Brigadier Harry Charles Illing, MC, (109514), late Infantry.
- Principal Chaplain James O'Sullivan, MBE, (218718), Royal Army Chaplains' Department, now RARO.
- Brigadier John Rowe Dutton Sharpe (277904), late Royal Armoured Corps.
- Colonel John Neville Shipster, DSO, (338931), late Infantry.
- Colonel Maurice Arthur John Tugwell (323017), late Infantry.

====== Royal Air Force ======
- Acting Air Vice-Marshal Derek Jack Furner, OBE, DFC, AFC.
- Air Commodore Edgar Harold Jenkins.
- Group Captain Peter Edward Bairsto, AFC.
- Group Captain John Kenyon French Mason.
- Group Captain Michael Horace Miller, AFC.

===== Civil Division =====
- George Fowler Adams, Consultant Physician, Belfast City Hospital. Professor of Geriatric Medicine, Queen's University, Belfast.
- Ota Adler. For services to the European Movement.
- Leslie Ethelbert George Ames. For services to Cricket.
- Alexander Elder Anton, Professor of Jurisprudence, University of Glasgow.
- Alderman John Pennington Ashton, MC, TD, lately Chairman, Police Committee, Association of Municipal Corporations.
- Herbert Ernest Bates, Author.
- John Reginald Beswick, Director, The Society of Motor Manufacturers and Traders Ltd. For services to Export.
- Kenneth Milton Bevins, TD, Chairman, British Insurance Association.
- John Manley Birch, Director, Lancashire United Transport Ltd.
- Wilfred Bowdell, City Treasurer, Westminster City Council.
- Alexander Milne Brebner, Assistant Secretary, Board of Customs & Excise.
- John Burns Brooksby, Director, Animal Virus Research Institute, Pirbright.
- John Prince Bull, Director, Industrial Injuries & Burns Unit, Medical Research Council.
- Thomas Howard Burton, Vice Chairman, Cincinnati Milacron Ltd. For services to Export.
- Eric Wallers Cheadle. For services to the Newspaper Society.
- Roy Edwin Close, lately Industrial Director, National Economic Development Office.
- John Bernard Maurice Coates, Chairman, Coates Brothers & Co. Ltd. For services to Export.
- David Edwin Coffer, OBE, General Secretary, The Royal British Legion.
- Morris Cohen, Director, Plant Pathology Laboratory, Ministry of Agriculture, Fisheries & Food.
- Wilfred Owen Crawt, Consultative Director, Victoria Wine-Tylers Ltd.
- Peter Howard Darby, QFSM, Chief Officer, Lancashire Fire Brigade.
- Alan Robert Davis, DL, Clerk to the Nottinghamshire County Council.
- Henry Davis. For charitable services.
- Thorold Barren Dickinson, Professor Emeritus of Film, University of London.
- Alfred John Farre Doulton, OBE, TD, Headmaster, Highgate School.
- Alderman Hugh Harrington Cazalet Douty, Chairman, Warwickshire Education Committee.
- Anthony James Dowell, Ballet Dancer.
- John Ernest Patrick Dunning, lately Chief Scientific Officer (B), Ministry of Defence.
- Joan Julia Vyvyan Eames. For political and public services in the West Country.
- John Trevor Edwards, lately Chairman, Liverpool Rent Assessment Panel.
- Percy Samuel Charles Ellis, OBE, TD, Deputy Chairman, Mardon Packaging International Ltd.
- Donald Godfrey Emerson, lately Chairman, Mond Division, Imperial Chemical Industries Ltd. For services to Export.
- Ulick Richardson Evans, FRS. For services to Metallurgy.
- Geoffrey Charles Fardell, MBE, County Architect, Hertfordshire.
- Cecil Charles Farrow, Overseas Executive, Plessey Telecommunications Ltd. For services to Export.
- Roger Johnson Fenney, MBE, Secretary to the Central Midwives Board.
- Henry Cecil Ferens, DL. For services to the Church and community in Durham.
- James Bernard Flanagan, OBE, Deputy Chief Constable, Royal Ulster Constabulary.
- John Beresford Fowler, Design Consultant, Colefax & Fowler Associates Ltd.
- Richard Harrington Franklin, lately Surgeon, Hammersmith Hospital.
- George Fotheringham Gainsborough, Secretary, The Institution of Electrical Engineers.
- George Edwin Gale, lately Director of Scientific & Technical Services, Supply Division, Department of Health & Social Security.
- Clifford Robert Garnham, Managing Director, Milk Marketing Board for England & Wales.
- Pierre Gildesgame, President, Maccabi Association. For services to sport.
- Laurence Joseph Goss, Assistant Secretary, Department of Employment.
- George Deans Gray, lately Registrar, General Teaching Council for Scotland.
- Kenneth Lincoln Hall, Director, Navy, Army and Air Force Institutes.
- Ernest Halliday, Assistant Secretary, Department of Health & Social Security.
- William Hanlon, TD, Deputy Chairman and Group Managing Director, Clarke Chapman—John Thompson Ltd. For services to Export.
- Heather Joan Harvey. For political services.
- Eric William Hawkins, Professor of Education and Director of the Language Teaching Centre, University of York.
- Reginald Walter Hill, OBE, Accountant, House of Lords.
- David Ronald Hunter, MC, TD, Head, Central Distribution Department, Imperial Chemical Industries Ltd.
- Robert Hurst, GM, Director of Research, The British Ship Research Association.
- Andrew William Seymour Hutchings, General Secretary, Assistant Masters Association.
- Maude Elizabeth Jones, Deputy Director-General, British Red Cross Society.
- Philip Hubert Keyte, Headmaster, Hazelwick School, Crawley, Sussex.
- Tom Kilburn, FRS, Professor of Computer Science, University of Manchester.
- Henry William Kirkby, Director of Research, Firth Brown Ltd., Sheffield.
- James Cyril Knight, lately Director, Property Services Agency, Department of the Environment.
- Austen Laing, Director General, British Trawlers' Federation Ltd.
- Henry John Lester, OBE, Chairman, Management Side, Whitley Council for the Health Service (Great Britain).
- Bernard Walter Lewis. For political and public services in Essex.
- Robert Lang Lickley, Assistant Managing Director, Hawker Siddeley Aviation Ltd.
- Professor David Keith-Lucas. For services to Aviation.
- Alister Geddes McCrae, Chairman, Clyde Port Authority.
- Frank Metcalfe, Director, Engineering Industry Training Board.
- Robert Moore, Principal Officer, Scottish Hospital Administrative Staffs Committee.
- William Maurice Naylor, Secretary, Sheffield Regional Hospital Board.
- Ivor Newton, Accompanist. For services to Music.
- William Noble, Controller of Estate Duty, Ministry of Finance for Northern Ireland.
- Joyce Lawrence, Lady Osborne. For political and public services in the Midlands.
- Eirwen Mary Owen, OBE, Director of Administration, Zoological Society of London.
- Stanley Roy Pawley, OBE, TD. For services to Journalism.
- Walter Arbuthnot Prideaux, MC, TD, Clerk of the Goldsmiths Company.
- Charles Waugh Renilson, Convener, Angus County Council.
- Paul Westmacott Richards, Professor of Botany, University College of North Wales, Bangor.
- Ronald Frederick Richardson, MBE, Deputy Chairman, The Electricity Council.
- Colin Henderson Roberts, FBA. For services to Papyrology.
- John Arthur Saxton, Director, Radio & Space Research Station, Science Research Council.
- The Honourable John Leopold Campbell Scarlett, lately House Governor, The London Hospital.
- Rudolf Schwarz, Principal Conductor and Artistic Director, Northern Sinfonia Orchestra.
- Antoinette Sibley (Mrs. Somes), Ballet Dancer.
- Philip George Smith, Chairman, Board of the London Metal Exchange. For services to Export.
- Ronald George Smith, Board Member, British Steel Corporation.
- John Trevor Stamp, Director, Animal Diseases Research Association.
- Professor James Alfred Steers. For services to Geographical Sciences and Conservation.
- Charles Bernard Stone, DSO, Senior Partner, Andrews, Kent & Stone.
- Michael Ian Bowstead Straker. For political and public services in Northumberland.
- Donald John Bratton Summers, Headmaster, Croesyceiliog School, Cwmbran, Monmouthshire.
- Gwyn Edward Ward Thomas, DFC, Deputy Chairman, and Managing Director, Trident Television Ltd.
- Robert Henry Stewart Thompson, Courtauld Professor of Bio-Chemistry, University of London.
- Robert Ribblesdale Thornton, Town Clerk, Leicester City Council.
- Thomas Wallace Walker, Treasurer and General Manager, Bank of Scotland.
- John Devereux Ward. For political services in Wessex.
- Wilfred Skirving Wareham, OBE, lately Deputy Director General, Takeover Panel.
- Edward William Weaver, Director, London Telecommunications Region, Post Office.
- Laurence Whistler, OBE, Glass Engraver and Designer.
- James Hanton Brown Wilson, Principal Inspector of Taxes, Board of Inland Revenue.
- Ernest Wistrich, Director, British Council of the European Movement.
- Oliver Heighes Woodforde, MBE, Legal Adviser to the General Synod of the Church of England and to the Church Commissioners for England.
- Colin Philip Joseph Woods, Assistant Commissioner, Metropolitan Police.

===== Diplomatic Service & Overseas List =====
- Rudolph Elliot Baynes. For public services in St. Vincent.
- Maurice Henry Cardiff, OBE, British Council Representative, France.
- Jack Cater, MBE, Secretary for Information, Hong Kong.
- Timothy Baswell Donaldson, Chairman, Monetary Authority, Bahama Islands.
- Richard Adolphe Charles Du Vivier, MBE, British Council Representative, Mexico.
- George Edgar Gardiner, OBE, MC. For services to the British community in Spain.
- Charles Gardner, OBE, Adviser to the Office of the Vice-President, Ministry of Home Affairs, Kenya.
- Kenneth Gould, TD. For services to British interests in Singapore.
- Ronald William Barrington Holland. For services to medicine and the community in Pakistan.
- George Stanley Charles Holliday. For services to British commercial interests in Africa.
- Michael Lloyd-Hirst, DSC. For services to the British community in Uruguay.
- Alexander Graham Mitchell, DFM, Governor, Turks & Caicos Islands.
- Allan Alexander Sinclair Rae. For services to British commercial interests in Switzerland.
- George Ronald Ross, OBE. For public services in Hong Kong.
- The Right Reverend Cecil Richard Rutt, Bishop of Taejon, South Korea.
- Terence Dare Sorby, Executive Director, Trade Development Council, Hong Kong.
- Alan Fletcher Thomas. For services to British commercial interests and the British community in Kenya.
- Gordon Alexander Ogilvie Thomson. For services to British interests in Nigeria.
- Walter Wilkinson Wallace, OBE, DSC, Secretary to Executive Council, Bermuda.
- Woo Pak-chuen, OBE. For public services in Hong Kong.

===== Australian States =====
====== State of New South Wales ======
- Louis Klein. For services to the community, especially the Jewish community.
- Professor Thomas Smith Reeve. For services to medicine.
- Ivor Percy Kidd Vidler, Clerk of the Legislative Assembly of New South Wales.

====== State of Victoria ======
- Professor Joseph Terrence Antony Burke, OBE, of East Hawthorn, For services to the arts.
- The Honourable Arthur Robert Mansell, of Mildura. For services to Parliament and the community.
- The Honourable Mr. Justice Charles Augustine Sweeney, of Toorak. For services to the 40th Eucharistic Congress.

====== State of Queensland ======
- The Right Reverend Wilfrid John Hudson, Anglican Coadjutor Bishop of Brisbane.
- John Reeve Nosworthy, of St. Lucia. For services to the law and in commerce.

==== Officer of the Order of the British Empire (OBE) ====
===== Military Division =====
====== Royal Navy ======
- Commander Hugh John Derek Mence Clamp, VRD, Royal Naval Reserve.
- The Reverend Neil Maguire Denlegh-Maxwell, QHC.
- Commander Ronald George Fry.
- Commander Tracey Colin Clayton Greaves.
- Commander Godfrey Charles Hathway.
- Commander Donald Francis Mills.
- Instructor Commander Kenneth Francis Northey.
- Surgeon Commander John Wilberforce Richardson.
- Commander Geoffrey Tristram Risdon.
- Commander Keith Francis Spiller.
- Major Stuart Lawrence Syrad, MC, Royal Marines.
- Commander Brian Hebden Wainwright.

====== Army ======
- Lieutenant-Colonel (Acting) Charles Addison Fitzherbert Baker-Cresswell, TD, (435180), The Northumbrian Volunteers, Territorial & Army Volunteer Reserve.
- Lieutenant-Colonel Piers Henry George Bengough (390934), The Royal Hussars (Prince of Wales's Own).
- Lieutenant-Colonel Ben Herbert Bradbrook (337979), Royal Corps of Transport.
- Lieutenant-Colonel Simon Edward Mountague Bradish-Ellames (397727), The Life Guards.
- Lieutenant-Colonel (Acting) Douglas Bartlett Burton, TD, (174444), Combined Cadet Force.
- Lieutenant-Colonel Sydney Harry Chapman (349718), The Royal Regiment of Fusiliers.
- Lieutenant-Colonel Russell Henry Collins, MC, (264626), The Light Infantry, now RARO.
- Lieutenant-Colonel John Anstey Hewerdine Kinghorne Findlater (385643), Royal Corps of Signals.
- Lieutenant-Colonel William Francis Allan Findlay (403445), 5th Royal Inniskilling Dragoon Guards.
- Lieutenant-Colonel Adam Brampton Douglas Gurdon (410449), The Black Watch (Royal Highland Regiment).
- Lieutenant-Colonel Cyril Martin Hilliard (222230), Royal Army Pay Corps.
- Colonel (Acting) Trefor Roland Jones (411988), Royal Regiment of Artillery.
- Lieutenant-Colonel David Iain Mackenzie (232583), The Royal Highland Fusiliers (Princess Margaret's Own Glasgow & Ayrshire Regiment), now RARO.
- Lieutenant-Colonel Malcolm Hudson Mackenzie-Orr (422377), Royal Army Ordnance Corps.
- Major Charles Laurence Dare Newell, MBE, (232732), Special Air Service Regiment, now retired.
- Lieutenant-Colonel Hugh Clive Erskine Woodes Rogers (368268), The Royal Regiment of Fusiliers.
- Lieutenant-Colonel Peter Shaw, TD, (443714), The Light Infantry & Mercian Volunteers, Territorial & Army Volunteer Reserve.
- Lieutenant-Colonel Dennis William Shuttleworth (400063), The Duke of Wellington's Regiment (West Riding).
- Lieutenant-Colonel (Acting) Robert Snell (404720), Army Cadet Force.
- Lieutenant-Colonel Joseph Nigel Stisted (420930), The Royal Scots (The Royal Regiment).
- Lieutenant-Colonel John David Wellings (403869), The Royal Hampshire Regiment.

====== Royal Air Force ======
- Wing Commander Alexander Frederick Davidson, DFC, (132724).
- Wing Commander Roy Edward Charles Davies (4044327).
- Wing Commander George Henry Dodd (199759), (Retired).
- Wing Commander David Thomas Evans (167821).
- Wing Commander (now Group Captain) Austin Roy Fox (502083).
- Wing Commander John Kenneth Craven-Griffiths (607215).
- Wing Commander Kenneth George Hunter (3032551).
- Wing Commander John Edward Nevill, MBE, (607627).
- Wing Commander Anthony Norman Nicholson (506846).
- Wing Commander John Ernest Whitlock, DFC, (53431), (Retired).
- Acting Wing Commander Leslie John Henry Harrison (1882754), Royal Air Force Volunteer Reserve (Training Branch).
- Squadron Leader Duncan Stuart Lennox (607803).

===== Civil Division =====
- Stephen Sharrah Abbott. For political services.
- Alderman Robert Arthur James Alcock. For political and public services in London.
- James Killoch Anderson, Surgeon in Chief, St. Andrew's Ambulance Corps.
- Leonard Audus, Alderman, Grantham Borough Council.
- Arthur Robert Barrow, Technical Secretary, Ministry of Defence.
- Major Arthur Henry Bates, ERD, Chairman, Board of Management and Trustees, Ulster Volunteer Force Hospital, Belfast.
- William Beatty, Member, Londonderry County Borough Education Committee.
- Albert George Bell, MBE, Assistant Secretary-General, Royal Institution of Chartered Surveyors.
- Harry Milne Bennett, Consultant Surgeon, Londonderry Hospital Management Committee.
- Robert Bennett, Technical Director, White Fish Authority.
- George Arthur Birtill, Managing Editor, Chorley Guardian.
- Gilbert Albert Waller Blackman, Director of Generation, Midlands Region, Central Electricity Generating Board.
- James Cecil Bloomfield. For services to Pharmacy and the National Health Service.
- Cecil Leslie Boult, Resident Director, Ystradgynlais, Smiths Industries, Ltd.
- Harries Collins Bowen, Investigator I, Royal Commission on Historical Monuments (England).
- William Ernest Bradbury, Principal, Water Resources Board, Department of the Environment.
- John Cromer Braun, lately Secretary, Advertising Standards Authority.
- Denis Herman Root Brearley, General Secretary, Incorporated Society of Musicians.
- Bernard Ralph Brewer, Senior Principal, Department of Health & Social Security.
- Janet Lesley Briant, General Medical Practitioner, Oldbury, Worcester.
- Henry Victor James Brooks, Joint Head, Transport Division, Unilever Ltd. For services to Export.
- Robert Brydon, Managing Director, Oliver & Son Ltd., Livestock Auctioneers.
- James Francis Buchan, Programme Controller, Grampian Television Ltd.
- Denis Osbert Bustard, General Manager Traffic, British Overseas Airways Corporation.
- John Alexander Cameron. For political and public services in Scotland.
- Gordon Henderson Naismith Campbell, Secretary, Parliamentary Press Gallery.
- Margaret Cassidy, President, All England Netball Association.
- Colonel George Victor Nudd Chadd, TD, DL, Chairman, County of Suffolk Territorial, Auxiliary & Volunteer Reserve and Army Cadet Force Committee.
- Joan Elizabeth Clark, Chief Regional Nursing Officer, South East Metropolitan Regional Hospital Board.
- Alderman Douglas Clift. For political and public services in Lancashire, (deceased.)
- Charles Francis Cole. For political services in London.
- Tom Kilner Cooke, General Medical Practitioner, Kirkbymoorside, Yorkshire.
- Walter Cooke, Headmaster, Highfield Comprehensive School, Felling, Co. Durham.
- Frederick Reginald Courtney, Superintending Mechanical and Electrical Engineer, Department of the Environment.
- Vincent Ellis Ambrose Coventry, QPM, Commander, Metropolitan Police.
- John Dyson Croft, Grade 2 Officer, Department of Employment.
- Arthur Alfred Thomas Cunliffe, lately Senior Principal Officer, Natural Environment Research Council.
- John Coucom Cutts, Principal, Metropolitan Police Office.
- Emrys David, County Secretary, Glamorgan, Soldiers', Sailors' & Airmen's Families Association.
- Griffith Thomas Mepham David, Chairman, Central National Health Service (Chemist Contractors) Committee for England & Wales.
- Donald Davies, Area Director, South Wales Area, National Coal Board.
- Cecil Dawson. For political services.
- Ingle William Dawson, Group Treasurer, Trent Vale Hospital Management Committee.
- William Hume Maxwell Dawson, President, Scottish Agricultural Organisation Society Ltd.
- Beatrice Eileen de Cardi. For services to Archaeology.
- Eric Dunkley, Headmaster, Rivermede County Junior School, West Molesey.
- Arthur Frederick Dunning, Head of Management Division, Strategy Branch, Planning & Transportation Department, Greater London Council.
- George Edward Eastham. For services to Association Football.
- George Granville Eastwood, General Secretary, Printing & Kindred Trades Federation.
- Kenneth John Eatwell, Regional Engineer, South West Metropolitan Regional Hospital Board.
- Alexander James Ellis, Managing Director, Smart & Brown Engineers Ltd., Spennymoor, County Durham.
- Dorothea Elwes. For political and public services in the South East.
- Eric Epson, Member, Noise Advisory Council.
- Irene Florence Everest. For political and public services in Wales.
- Clifford Douglas Forrest, Chief Officer, Leeds City Fire Brigade.
- Joseph Patrick Fox, Member, City of Birmingham Probation & After-Care Committee.
- Cynthia Elizabeth Fraser. For services to the Tate Gallery.
- Leopold Friedman, Chief Executive, International Marketing Division, Rubery Owen Holdings Ltd. For services to Export.
- John Gardner, Division Safety Services Manager, Agricultural Division, Billingham, Imperial Chemical Industries Ltd.
- George Edinmore Gather. For political and public services in the Midlands.
- Hugh Lassam Goodson, President, The Sail Training Association.
- Maurice Hugh Charles Gordon, Consultant, Westland Helicopters Ltd. For services to Export.
- Frank Edward Gostling, Chairman and Managing Director, E. Gostling (Builders) Ltd.
- Harold Gough, Regional Quantity Surveyor, Newcastle Regional Hospital Board.
- The Reverend Leonard William Goulding, Chairman, Chaplains' Committee, Air Cadet Council.
- John Courtney Graddon, lately Assistant Editor, The Royal Society.
- John Greene, Chief Nursing Officer, Cornwall Hospitals Group.
- Frank Greenhalgh, Chief Engineer, Bristol Avon River Authority.
- Ashley Martin Greenwood, MC, Foreign & Commonwealth Office, former Attorney General of Fiji and Attorney General of Gibraltar.
- William Thomas Grigg. For political and public services in the West Country.
- Alexander Eddie Guild, Engineer and Manager, Gwent Water Board.
- Elsie Gwilt, MBE, Chairman, Orthoptists Board.
- Bernard Charles Hackett. For services to the community in Ross-on-Wye.
- Margaret Dorothy Hall, Assistant Keeper Grade I, British Museum.
- Robert Nelson Hamilton, lately General Manager, Colchester Telephone Area, Post Office.
- David Augustine Harper, Member, North West Economic Planning Council.
- Raymond Leonard George Hartwell, lately Resident Engineer, Sir Owen Williams & Partners.
- Eric Haslam, QPM, Deputy Chief Constable, Kent County Constabulary.
- Lindsay Henry, DL. For services to agriculture in Northern Ireland.
- Dinah Myfanwy Herbert, Headmistress, Greenwood School, Halstead.
- Wilfrid Cecil Frederick Hessenberg, Head of Scientific & Technical Services, R. & D., British Steel Corporation.
- Raymond Oswin Hopkins, HM Inspector, Department of Education & Science.
- Percy Victor Howes. For services to handicapped people and to the Cathedral in Norwich.
- Molly Horrocks Hudson, MBE, Matron, Royal Belfast Hospital for Sick Children.
- Norman Campbell Hughes, Consultant Plastic Surgeon, Northern Ireland Hospitals Authority.
- Herbert Henry Hunter, Director of Computer Services, Ministry of Finance for Northern Ireland.
- Barbara Dorothy Iredell, Member, Cumberland Education Committee.
- Henry Donovan Jeffries, Clerk, Beeston & Stapleford Urban District Council.
- Alderman James Black Jenkins, Chairman, Mansfield Hospital Management Committee.
- Major Herbert Johnes Lloyd-Johnes, TD, Chairman, Historic Buildings Council for Wales.
- Douglas Erwin Johns, Vice-Chairman, London & South Eastern Trustee Savings Bank.
- Alexander Kennedy Johnston. For social services particularly to hospital administration in Eastern Scotland.
- Hazel Constance Churchill Carmalt-Jones, Regional Administrator, Eastern Region, Women's Royal Voluntary Service.
- John Godfrey Keeling, Vice Chairman, National Seed Development Organisation Ltd.
- Adam Kehrle (The Reverend Brother Adam). For services to bee-keeping.
- Joanna Elizabeth Kelley, Assistant Director (Women & Girls), Prison Department, Home Office.
- Alexander Kelly, Regional Veterinary Officer, Ministry of Agriculture, Fisheries & Food.
- Robert Kerr, MBE, Regional Deputy Chairman, North West Region, British Gas Corporation.
- Fred Keys, lately Secretary, Pye of Cambridge Ltd.
- Otakar Kraus, Singer.
- Alan George Kruger, ERD, Controller, Personnel & Finance, Midlands Postal Region, Post Office.
- John Roy Lane, Superintending Engineer, Hampshire Sub-Unit, South Eastern Road Construction Unit.
- Jeanie Sarah Stirling Law, QPM. HM Assistant Inspector of Constabulary.
- Samuel Paterson Leithead, Deputy Director, Civil Air Traffic Operations, Civil Aviation Authority.
- Frederick George Lennhoff. For services to the education of maladjusted children.
- Horace Emlyn Leonard, Principal, Welsh Office.
- Robert Duncan Lister, Senior Principal Scientific Officer, Department of the Environment.
- Gladys Mary Little, National Chairman, Women's Section, Royal British Legion.
- John Bradburn Lloyd, Chief Pharmacist, United Manchester Hospitals.
- Herbert Loebl, Partner, London & Northern Associates, Newcastle upon Tyne. For services to Export.
- Stanley Ludkin, Medical Officer of Health, Durham County Council.
- Harry Ludlam. For public services in Halifax.
- Audrey Isobel McAllister. For services to the elderly in Windsor.
- Agnes Margaret Macdonald, lately Editor, Chambers Twentieth Century Dictionary.
- James Haldane Calder Macleod, TD, DL. For political and public services in Glasgow.
- Benjamin Waldo Maguire. Controller, Northern Ireland, British Broadcasting Corporation.
- Owen Stephen Masefield, MBE, Chairman, Motor Insurers' Bureau.
- Alderman Thomas Matheson, President, North Eastern Area, Royal Air Forces Association.
- Christina McLarty Morley, Deputy President, Middlesex Branch, British Red Cross Society.
- Stanley Thomas Morris, Director, Agricultural Economics Unit, University of Exeter.
- Isaac Henry Morten, Vice-Chairman, Peak Park Planning Board.
- Doris Irene Moss, MBE, Chief Regional Organiser, Headquarters, Women's Royal Voluntary Service.
- Hugh Black Muir, General Medical Practitioner, Auchtermuchty, Fife.
- Margaret Doris Nash, Head Teacher, Sea Mills Infants' School, Bristol.
- Richard Charles Newman, Principal, Royal Courts of Justice.
- Leonard Stanley Newton, Director, Ceramics, Glass & Mineral Products Industry Training Board.
- Geoffrey Claude Nichols, DFC, Chairman and Managing Director, Rotaprint Ltd. For services to Export.
- Henry Nicholson. For services to the milk industry.
- Captain Frank Edwin Garthwaite Owen, TD, Principal, Westham House Adult Residential College, Barford, Warwick.
- Glyn Owen, Senior Principal Scientific Officer, Cabinet Office.
- Cyril Palmer, Foreign & Commonwealth Office.
- Samuel Harris Park, QFSM, Firemaster, Central Area Fire Brigade, Glasgow.
- John Stephen Parker, Principal, Department of Trade & Industry.
- David Eyre Percival, City Architect, Norwich.
- James Henry Caswall Phelips, Deputy Clerk to the Worcestershire County Council.
- Arthur Henry Phillips, Principal, HM Stationery Office.
- John Humphrey Murray Pinder. For services to the European Movement.
- Leonard Sutherland Powell, Deputy Principal, Garnett College of Education (Technical) London.
- George Powter, lately Deputy Accountant, House of Commons.
- John Lamplugh Prescott, Principal, Monopolies Commission.
- Sidney James Wilson Price, lately Chairman, Industrial Tribunals.
- Captain William Leonard Pugh, Commodore Master, SS British Surveyor, B.P. Tanker Co. Ltd.
- Gordon Purdy, lately General Medical Practitioner, Oakham, Rutland.
- Cyril Purnell, Secretary, Children's Regional Planning Committee for Yorkshire.
- John Stephen Rank, Director of Development & Architecture, Stockport County Borough Council.
- Stanley Ronald Rawson, Chairman, United Drapery Stores Tailoring Ltd.
- Helen Frieda Read, Director, Ernest Read Music Association. For services to music for the young.
- Stephen Charles Reiss. For services to the Arts.
- William Oliver Reynolds, MBE, General Manager, Eastern Region, British Railways Board.
- Mary Kathleen Robb, Matron, Royal Victoria Hospital, Belfast
- Arthur John Robertson, lately Chief Marine & Engineer Superintendent, C. Rowbotham & Sons (Management) Ltd.
- John Frederick Robinson, Principal, Intervention Board far Agricultural Produce, Ministry of Agriculture, Fisheries & Food.
- Henry Rosenberg, Chairman, West Sussex Executive Council, National Health Service.
- Elizabeth Jane Rowe, Director, Association of British Adoption Agencies.
- William Thomas Alan Rundle, Chairman and Managing Director, Wright Rain Ltd. For services to Export.
- Alexander McGibbon Russell, Headmaster, Stanely Green High School, Paisley.
- Nathaniel James Savage. For services to the National Trust in Cornwall.
- Philip Eric Scarfe, Divisional Director, Manufacturing, Derby Engine Division, Rolls-Royce (1971) Ltd.
- Mana St. David Sedgwick, Chairman, Board of Visitors, HM Prison, Holloway.
- George Frederick Sheard, Deputy Director, Glasshouse Crops Research Institute, Littlehampton.
- Duncan Menzies Soutar Simpson, Chief Test Pilot, Hawker Siddeley Aviation Ltd., Dunsfold.
- Betsy Smith, Chief Nursing Officer, East Birmingham Hospital.
- Prophet James Laurence Smith, Member, Highlands & Islands Development Board.
- James McGregor Sowerby, Director of Engineering, British Aircraft Corporation.
- Douglas William George Sprackland, Government and Broadband Marketing Manager, Pye Telecommunications Ltd.
- Thomas Oakeley Dyne Steel, Chairman, Hereford National Insurance Local Tribunal.
- Kenneth Steen, County Planning Officer, Cumberland County Council.
- Vernon Stott, Chairman & Managing Director, James Stott & Co. (Engineers) Ltd. For services to Export.
- Eric Arthur Styles, Chairman, Luton Savings Council.
- Peter Geoffrey Swann, Chief Medical Officer, Esso Petroleum Co. Ltd.
- Raymond John Horton Targett, Grade 2 Officer, Department of Employment.
- Alexander Eric Robertson Taylor, Chairman, Scottish Committee, Regular Forces Resettlement Service.
- Herbert Harris-Taylor, lately Treasurer, British Atlantic Committee.
- Stanley Lionel Teasdale, Deputy Director of Audit, Exchequer & Audit Department.
- Ernest Gerald Thompson. For services to the European Movement.
- Walter Thornton, Chairman, Birmingham Federation of Boys' Clubs.
- Douglas Sidney Tilbe, Chairman, Co-ordinating Committee for the Welfare of Evacuees from Uganda.
- Raymond Stanley Tindle. For services to the Newspaper Industry.
- Reginald Arthur Titt, Senior Principal Scientific Officer, Ministry of Defence.
- Herbert Alexander Conway Todd, Director of Research, Lambeg Industrial Research Association, Northern Ireland.
- Bessie Trembath, Divisional Children's Officer (Scotland), Dr. Barnardo's Homes.
- John Robert Trusting, Managing Director, Harrold Leather Manufacturing Co. Ltd. For services to Export.
- Hugh Stanley Verity, Senior Supply & Transport Officer, Ministry of Defence.
- Joseph Ian Waddington, Director, Clyde River Purification Board.
- Alderman Norman Walker. For services to handicapped people in Bradford.
- Kenneth Rushton Walsh, Director, Exchanges Department, British Council.
- Reginald William Ward, MBE, Chief Engineer, Air Weapons Division, Hawker Siddeley Dynamics Ltd.
- Dorothy Emily Warren (Mrs. Tancock), Secretary, The Nursery School Association of Great Britain & Northern Ireland.
- Colonel William Innes Watson, TD, DL. For public services in County Durham.
- Hew Matthew Brown Watt, Farmer, Orsett, Essex. For services to the agricultural industry.
- Helen Peebles Waudby, Chairman, The British Steam Specialties Ltd., Leicester. For services to Export.
- Hugh Edward Griffiths Wells. For political and public services in the Midlands.
- Thomas Harold Westlake. For services to the fruit and vegetable wholesale trade in Cardiff.
- Brian Albert George Weston, Technical Adviser, Ministry of Defence.
- Harry Anthony Wheeler, Senior Partner, Wheeler & Sproson (Architects), Kirkcaldy and Edinburgh.
- Kenneth Mortimore Wherly, QPM, Deputy Chief Constable, Devon & Cornwall Constabulary.
- Leonard Frederick William White, MBE, Secretary, National Association of Divisional Executives for Education.
- Margaret Justin Blanco White (Mrs. Waddington), Superintending Architect, Scottish Office.
- Richard Cecil Whitehead, Engineer and Manager, City of Birmingham Water Department.
- Olive Marjorie Whitney, Senior Representative, Cyprus, Young Men’s Christian Association.
- Muriel Williams (Muriel Margaret Maud Mapleston), Director-General and Secretary, Musicians' Benevolent Fund.
- John Williamson, lately General Manager, Port of Tyne Authority.
- William Ernest Willshaw, MBE, Consultant, GEC Electronic Tube Co. Ltd.
- Charles Murton Wyles, Chairman, English Table Tennis Association.

===== Diplomatic Service & Overseas List =====
- Ronald Albert Archer. For services to British commercial interests in Nigeria.
- Frederick Denis Badgerow. For services to British commercial interests and the British community in El Salvador.
- The Reverend Brian Hudson Bailey. For services to the Church and the community in Botswana.
- Victor Middleton Binns. For services to British commercial interests and the British community in Morocco.
- David Elliott Spiby Blatherwick, First Secretary, HM Embassy, Dublin.
- William John Cheesman, First Secretary (Commercial), British High Commission, Dacca.
- James Kenneth Brian Davenport, MBE, lately First Secretary, HM Embassy, Managua.
- Christopher John Rowland Dawson, QPM, CPM, Deputy Commissioner of Police, Royal Hong Kong Police Force.
- Leonard Charles Derrick-Jehu. For services to the British community in Rio de Janeiro.
- John Dartnall Dexter. For services to the British community in Milan.
- Winefred Durbin, MBE, lately First Secretary (Aid), British High Commission, Kampala.
- The Honourable Vincent Frederick Floissac. For public services in St. Lucia.
- Isaac Glanville Fonseca, JP. For public services in the British Virgin Islands.
- Thomas Patrick Forde. For services to Anglo-Brunei relations.
- Douglas Monteith Freegard, Financial Secretary, Gilbert & Ellice Islands Colony.
- Ebenezer Raymond Gibbons. For services to medicine and the British community in Uganda.
- David Stormont Gibbs. For services to education in Darjeeling, India.
- Thomas Huntington Gillson, Head of Chancery and Consul, HM Embassy, Kabul.
- James Herbert Grimes, British Council Representative, New Zealand.
- Neville Harrison, Auditor General, Lesotho.
- Percy Frederick Hutchinson. For services to British commercial interests and the British community in Liberia.
- John William Scott James. For services to British commercial interests and the British community in Qatar.
- Eric William King, Chief Agricultural Officer. British Honduras.
- Captain Eldon Eden Kirkconnell. For public services in the Cayman Islands.
- Bartholomew Francis Knight. For services to education in the Lebanon.
- Lam Kun-shing. For services to commerce in Hong Kong.
- Ernest Irfon Lee, Administration Officer, Commerce & Industry Department, Hong Kong.
- George Dennis Leinster, MBE. For services to the British community in Madrid.
- James Daniel Lewis, Permanent Secretary, Ministry of Finance, Montserrat.
- James Valentine Loudon. For services to British commercial interests and the British community in Los Angeles.
- The Reverend Brian Benjamin Matthews. For services to the Church and the British community in Monte Carlo.
- Brownlow David Molesworth. For services to leprosy control in Malawi.
- David Moloney. For services to British interests in Bahrain.
- William Denis Nightingale, lately Regional Information Officer, British Government Office, Toronto.
- Alfred Samuel Pinks. For public services in British Honduras.
- George Pitkeathly, Chief Education Officer, British Education Service, New Hebrides.
- Lieutenant-Colonel Robert Miles Antony Reese, lately Director, Save the Children Fund Home, Qui Nhon, Vietnam.
- Kenneth Graham Reid. For services to British commercial interests in Spain.
- Brigadier Gordon Stewart Newham Richardson, DSO, lately Director, Gurkha Re-integration Training Scheme, Nepal.
- Derek Seymour Royals. For services to the British community in Darjeeling, India.
- Timothy Frank Siward Scott, British Council Regional Representative, Calcutta.
- Dorothy Mary Shillaker. For services to nursing and the blind in Iran.
- Brian Francis Patrick Slevin, QPM, CPM, Deputy Commissioner of Police, Royal Hong Kong Police Force.
- Wing Commander Edward Ralph Smouha. For services to the British community in Geneva.
- John Anthony Benedict Stewart, Head of Chancery, British High Commission, Kampala.
- Professor Richard Radford Trussell. For services to medicine and the British community in Uganda.
- Robert Edward Frederick Walter, First Secretary, HM Embassy, Washington.
- Wiltshire Dall Ware-Austin. For services to land conservation in Ethiopia.
- Edward Irving Watty, Government Pathologist, Dominica.
- Harold Wilson Wheate. For services to leprosy control in East Africa.
- Douglas Arthur White. For services to the British community in Yokohama, Japan.
- The Reverend Canon Eric Charles Wilcockson. For services to the Church and the British community in Rio de Janeiro.
- Denys Aubrey Tudor Wild. For services to the British community in Assam, India.
- Margaret Elizabeth Wilson. For services to medical research in The Gambia.
- Alfred Evelyn Harry Wood, QFSM, Director of Fire Services, Hong Kong.
- Everette Selwyn Woodroffe. For services to the community in Grenada.
- Clive Dudley Wright, lately Comptroller of Posts & Telegraphs, British Solomon Islands Protectorate.
- Kenneth Campbell Wright, lately First Secretary, HM Embassy, Bonn.
- Alex Wu Shu-chih. For services to the community in Hong Kong.

===== Australian States =====
====== State of New South Wales ======
- Ronald William Auswild. For services to commerce.
- Walter James Bryant, MM. For services to the building industry.
- Murray Raymond Callaghan. For services to education.
- Ashleigh John Chown. For, services to the community.
- James Herbert Cooper. For services to commerce.
- Thomas George Fawkner. For services to industry.
- John Douglas Lesingham Gaden. For services to the community.
- Colin Joseph Hines. For services to ex-servicemen.
- Arthur Stanley Parsonage. For services to commerce and the community.
- Claire Ross. For services to the arts and to the community.
- Donald Sydney Smith. For services to music.
- The Honourable Frank William Spicer. For services to the community.
- Archibald Norman Taylor. For services to commerce.
- Margaret Elizabeth Waddell. For services to the community.
- Joan Mary Woodhill. For services in the fields of nutrition and dietetics.

====== State of Victoria ======
- George Bankin Bearham, of Camberwell. For services to medicine and the community.
- Kenneth Thomas Blamey, ED, of North Balwyn. For services in the military and insurance fields.
- James Douglas Butchart, of Ashburton. For services to scouting and the community.
- John Kevin Clarebrough, of Camberwell. For services to medicine.
- Maurice Cohen, of North Caulfield. For services to the Jewish community, and in the fields of education and social services.
- Adela Lardi (Mother Mary Sebastian), of Gardenvale. For inspiring services in Catholic education.
- Howard Murray Lightfoot, of Elwood. For services to the blind and the pharmaceutical industry.
- The Reverend Rabbi Doctor Izaak Rapaport, of South Yarra. For services to his religion and the Jewish community.
- The Right Reverend Monsignor Kevin Michael Toomey, of Surrey Hills. For services to the 40th Eucharistic Congress.
- The Reverend Father Brian Walsh, of Elsternwick. For services to the 40th Eucharistic Congress.
- Councillor Kenneth Crago Webb, JP, of Wendouree. For services in local government and to the community.

====== State of Queensland ======
- Alderman Harold Archibald George Crawford, of New Farm. For services in local government and to the community.
- Leonard Wallace Doggett, of St. Lucia. For services in the fields of commerce, mining and oil exploration and to the community.
- Flora Alice Johnson, of Morningside. For services to the Queensland Country Women's Association.
- Councilor Eric Sturdy Pryce Netterfield, of Julia Creek. For his outstanding services in local government and to the community.
- Elizabeth Worthington Stanhope Sullivan, of New Farm, lately Adviser-in-Nursing, Department of Health.

==== Member of the Order of the British Empire (MBE) ====
===== Military Division =====
====== Royal Navy ======
- Lieutenant Commander (SD) (C) Ronald Anton, RD, Royal Naval Reserve.
- Lieutenant Albert Edward Pryke Briggs.
- Instructor Lieutenant Barry Alfred Brooking.
- Lieutenant Commander Walter William Buckingham.
- Lieutenant Commander Cyril George Caudrey.
- Warrant Officer II John Fyffe, RMV 203541, Royal Marines Reserve.
- Lieutenant Commander (MS) Henry Harbour.
- Lieutenant-Commander Allan Nelson, DSM.
- Lieutenant Commander Thomas Gordon Range.
- Lieutenant (CS) John Charles Williams.

====== Army ======
- Major (Quartermaster) William Wilson Blair (469917), Royal Regiment of Artillery.
- Major The Honourable Thomas Patrick John Boyd-Carpenter (452231), Scots Guards.
- Captain Anthony Gerald Francis Bull (476188), Intelligence Corps.
- Captain David Thomas Burton (468955), Royal Corps of Signals.
- Major (Acting) George Robert Caird (472395), Corps of Royal Military Police.
- 22797425 Warrant Officer Class 1 William Cairns, The Royal Irish Rangers (27th (Inniskilling) 83rd & 87th).
- Lieutenant Ronald Dan Cassidy (491216), The Royal Green Jackets.
- Major Derek William Clary (426623), Royal Army Educational Corps.
- Major Simon George Fitzhugh Cox (433540), The Royal Scots Dragoon Guards (Carabiniers & Greys).
- Major Graham Coxon (461676), The Staffordshire Regiment (The Prince of Wales's).
- 22526333 Warrant Officer Class 1 Eric George Davey, Corps of Royal Engineers.
- Captain David Brychan Edwards (304132), Royal Army Pay Corps, now retired.
- Major John Francis Faithfull (475843), General List, for services with the Malawi Army.
- Captain Thomas Galloway Ferguson (483373), The Worcestershire & Sherwood Foresters Regiment (29th/45th Foot).
- Captain (Acting) Ernest Jack Francis (256758), Army Cadet Force.
- Major (Quartermaster) William Robert French (472868), Royal Corps of Transport.
- Major Peter Charles Crichton Gobourn (302159), Royal Corps of Transport.
- 22234872 Warrant Officer Class 2 Ronald Arthur Gough, The Light Infantry, Territorial & Army Volunteer Reserve.
- Major John Graham Hambleton (455022), Royal Corps of Transport.
- 2547780 Warrant Officer Class 1 (Local) Joseph Vincent Hanlon, Corps of Royal Electrical & Mechanical Engineers.
- Major (Acting) Ronald Herbert George Harris (428452), Army Cadet Force.
- Captain (Quartermaster) Albert Leslie Kindle (470928), Royal Regiment of Artillery, Territorial & Army Volunteer Reserve.
- 2628421 Warrant Officer Class 1 Raymond Pearse Huggins, Grenadier Guards.
- Major Richard Henry Stewart Irvine, MC, (Retired) (94901), late The King's Own Scottish Borderers, now RARO.
- Major (Quartermaster) Austin Patrick Joyce, MM, BEM, (474144), Welsh Guards.
- Major Leslie Joseph Kennedy (445901), Corps of Royal Engineers.
- 22300280 Warrant Officer Class 1 James Patrick Kirwan, Royal Corps of Transport.
- 22811780 Warrant Officer Class 1 Arthur Melville Lambert, Royal Corps of Transport.
- Major Richard Lea (437100), The Queen's Regiment.
- Major William Abbott Le Blanc-Smith (452434), 4th/7th Royal Dragoon Guards.
- 22143224 Warrant Officer Class 1 Alfred Nield, Corps of Royal Military Police.
- Major Michael David Parsons (430409), The Queen's Lancashire Regiment.
- Major (Quartermaster) Frederick Charles Henry Pavitt (462639), 15th/19th The King's Royal Hussars.
- Major John Ievers Pocock (451311), 1st The Queen's Dragoon Guards.
- Major Anthony John Powell (412221), Royal Corps of Transport.
- Major Arthur Barham Shadbolt, MC, (220637), Corps of Royal Engineers.
- Captain (Quartermaster) Ellis William Peterson Smith (476194), Royal Regiment of Artillery.
- W/397839 Warrant Officer Class 1 Anne Beatrice Mary Stead, Women's Royal Army Corps.
- Major (Quartermaster) William John Thomas (471547), Royal Regiment of Artillery.
- Major Hudson Taylor Thompson (473678), Royal Army Medical Corps, Territorial & Army Volunteer Reserve.
- 2614492 Warrant Officer Class 2 George Vincent White, Grenadier Guards, now discharged.
- Captain (Quartermaster) Leonard George White (479892), Grenadier Guards.
- Major (Traffic Officer) (now Lieutenant-Colonel) Samuel John Wyatt (444862), Royal Corps of Signals.

====== Overseas Awards ======
- Major Dominic Louis Collado, The Gibraltar Regiment.
- Major Robert Dennis Swift, The Bermuda Regiment.

====== Royal Air Force ======
- Squadron Leader Patrick Richard Bennedik (573211).
- Squadron Leader Eric Blott (52990).
- Squadron Leader Edward George Clark (164828).
- Squadron Leader Peter Robert Holtby (609198).
- Squadron Leader Thomas William Mallett (578885).
- Squadron Leader William Anthony Scott (56958).
- Squadron Leader Roger Wallace Randal Young (609052).
- Acting Squadron Leader Arthur Edward Smith (547595), Royal Air Force Volunteer Reserve (Training Branch).
- Flight Lieutenant Alan John Brooks (3510316).
- Flight Lieutenant Colin Evans (681405).
- Flight Lieutenant Peter Trevan Gostick (571784).
- Flight Lieutenant Brian Victor Little (582060).
- Flight Lieutenant Bryan Frank Naylor (4033376), RAF Regiment.
- Flight Lieutenant Stanley Arthur James Piper (1866359).
- Flight Lieutenant Bryan Edward Stoat (2553275), (Retired).
- Warrant Officer Leslie Kenneth Anson (U1001281).
- Warrant Officer Frank Appleyard (W0569365).
- Warrant Officer George Benstead (H1869183).
- Warrant Officer Peter William Cecil Bougourd (B1609287).
- Warrant Officer Henry Roy Crump (F0544629).
- Warrant Officer John Gilbert Date (T0570543).
- Warrant Officer James Owen Higgs (G0550067).
- Warrant Officer Lionel Dennis Millington (B1088507).
- Warrant Officer Eric Downton Millson (W3075898).
- Warrant Officer Patric Fielden Richards, (H1897700).
- Warrant Officer Ronald Arthur Wood (S3007677).
- Warrant Officer Raymond John Wyatt (V0538288).
- Warrant Officer Charles Edward Yeates (D0928297), RAF Regiment.
- Master Air Electronics Operator William John Burge (X3514613).

===== Civil Division =====
- Kenneth Edwin Abbs, Industrial Relations Manager, British Gas Corporation.
- Joseph Abrahams, Technical Sales Representative, Snow & Co. Ltd. For services to Export.
- George Edwin Addison, Headmaster, Hurworth County Primary School, County Durham.
- William John Adjey, Superintendent, Oldpark Works, Belfast Water Commissioners.
- James McKinlay Allan, Head of North Maintenance Division, Glasgow Telephone Area, Post Office.
- Anthony John Allard, Duty Officer, Control Centre, British Overseas Airways Corporation.
- Kathleen Mary Allison, Chairman, East Anglian Area Nurse Training Committee.
- Arthur John Anderson, lately Officer in Charge of Works, Royal Hospital School, Holbrook.
- Roland John Ernest Andrews, Manufacturing Manager, Alvis, British Leyland (UK) Ltd.
- Anne Alicia Archdale, Senior Executive Officer, Ministry of Defence.
- John Ernest Arnold, General Manager and Actuary, Warrington & District Trustee Savings Bank.
- Mildred Elizabeth Ashford, lately Executive Officer, Rothamsted Experimental Station, Harpenden.
- Eric Harold Atkins, lately Senior Executive Officer, Department of Trade & Industry.
- Harold Bailey, Senior Executive Officer, Department of Health & Social Security.
- Kenneth Hubert Frederick Baker, TD. For political services.
- John Ernest Barker, Section Leader, Methods Department, Dowty Rotol Ltd.
- Jack Percival Barnett, BEM, lately Retired Officer II, HMS Heron, Ministry of Defence.
- Anne Muriel Baxter, lately Sister, Park Hospital, Davyhulme, Manchester.
- Joan Irene Beale, lately Joint Secretary, School of Education, University of Bristol.
- Honor Benton, lately Teacher, Endon County Secondary Modern School, Staffordshire.
- John Sydney Binning, TD, Senior Medical Officer, Euston, British Railways Board.
- Eric William Thomas Birnie. For political services in Scotland.
- Ethel May Black, Nursing Officer, Garlands Hospital, Carlisle.
- Joyce Vera Blake, Secretary to the Director, Shipbuilders & Repairers National Association.
- Sydney Clifford Blazdell, Senior Executive Officer, Department for National Savings.
- Charles Ronald Boardman, Shift Manager, Viscose Fibre Works, Trafford Park, Courtaulds Ltd.
- Jack Richard Boddy, District Organiser, National Union of Agricultural & Allied Workers.
- Hester Janet Booth, Honorary Director, Langford Cross Family Home, East Qandon, Surrey.
- Alderman James Francis Borrows. For political services in Lancashire.
- Alexander Bottomley, Member, Economic Development Committee for Machine Tools.
- John Albert Brassington, Senior Lecturer and Deputy Head of Engineering Department, Grantham College of Further Education.
- Robert Donald Breeze, Clerk, Norfolk Army Cadet Force.
- Lucy Matilda Brereton, Member, Ludlow Rural District Council, Shropshire.
- Phyllis Ruby Brierley. For services to the community in Rochdale.
- Barry Briggs. For services to Speedway Riding.
- Reginald Frank Broom, Group Engineer, Salisbury Hospital Management Committee.
- Ethel Anne Brown, Alderman Warwick Borough Council.
- Flora Janet Brown, Headmistress, Windlaw Primary School, Glasgow.
- Olive Joan Brumfield. For services to youth in the East Riding of Yorkshire.
- Vera Bryant, Water Safety Organiser, Royal Society for the Prevention of Accidents.
- Leslie Joseph Buddle, lately Headmaster, Mora Junior Mixed School, London Borough of Brent.
- Robert Burgess, Senior Executive Officer, Department of Education & Science.
- Arthur Baron Burn. For services to the community in East London and South Essex.
- Arthur John Burton, County Staff Officer, Warwickshire, St. John Ambulance Association and Brigade.
- Kenneth John Butt, Higher Executive Officer, Ordnance Survey.
- Jessie Carr Cameron, lately Matron, Aberfeldy Cottage Hospital, Perthshire.
- Cyril Charles Canham, Chief Superintendent, Metropolitan Police.
- Hilary Carré, HM Greffier and Treasurer of Sark, Channel Islands.
- Janet Chadwick, Farmer, Kinnerton, Cheshire.
- Laetitia Clare Ernestine Chalk, lately County Home Help Organiser, Somerset.
- Jonathan Chalkley, Assistant Education Officer (Finance & Administration) West Riding Local Education Authority.
- Albert Chambers, lately Production Manager (Special Duties), Doncaster Area Headquarters, National Coal Board.
- Emrys Charles, Headmaster, Gwenfro. Junior School, Wrexham.
- Daniel Charlesworth, Alderman, Congleton Borough Council.
- Marjorie Irene Charlesworth, lately Higher Executive Officerj Ministry of Defence.
- Francis George Chater, Divisional Organiser, No. 17 Division, Amalgamated Union of Engineering Workers.
- John Cedric Chilvers, Administrator and Director, Grand Theatre, Swansea.
- Lydia Helen Cobb, Organist, St. Kentigern's Church, Aspatria, Cumberland.
- Helen Rhoda Conway, Director of Nursing Services, Fife County Council.
- Kenneth Carlyle Corry. For political and public services in the North of England.
- Dorothy May Cotterill, Clerical Officer, Ministry of Agriculture, Fisheries & Food.
- Annie Lotta Coupland, Sister, North Cambridgeshire Hospital, Wisbech.
- William John Cousins, Professional and Technology Officer, Grade I, Department of the Environment.
- Helen Christina Cousland, Principal, Glasgow School of Radiography, Royal Beatson Memorial Hospital.
- Janet Maxwell Coutts. For social services in Dunbartonshire.
- Tom Cramond, Senior Naval Auxiliary Officer, Stranraer.
- Major John Arthur Henry Crampton, Retired Officer III, Ministry of Defence.
- Mary Elizabeth Crees, Chairman, Tree Lovers League, Birmingham.
- Florence Rose Crowson, Grade 5 Officer, Department of Employment.
- Kazimierz Tadeusz Czelmy, Supervisor, Body Trim Laboratory, Product Development, Ford Motor Co. Ltd.
- Elizabeth Frances Dacre, TD. For public services in Sussex.
- Christopher Hodson Davies, lately Housing Manager, Chelmsford Borough Council.
- Norman Victor Degville, General Secretary, National Egg Packers' Association Ltd.
- Harold Charles James Disbury, Process Services Manager, Reactor Group, Dounreay, United Kingdom Atomic Energy Authority.
- Eleanor Isabel Dodds, Superintendent of Home Nurses, District Nursing Service, Bootle.
- David John Downham, Group Secretary, Herrison Hospital Management Committee, Dorchester.
- James Albert Driscoll, Inspector of Taxes, Board of Inland Revenue.
- Molly Hilary Tagalie Duffield, lately Principal, School of Physiotherapy, Middlesex Hospital.
- Edward Henry Walter Durham, Senior Mechanical Designer, Racal Communications Ltd.
- Margarita Elsie Dyer, Nursing Officer, St. George's Hospital, Rothweil, Leeds.
- Harold Patrick Easto, Higher Executive Officer, Department of Trade & Industry.
- John William Edmond, Road Safety Organiser, North Eastern Region, Royal Society for the Prevention of Accidents.
- Kathleen Louisa Edwards, Assistant Secretary Civil Service Union.
- Alderman William Harold Edwards. For public services in Mid-Wales, particularly in Radnorshire.
- Edward George Ellis. For services to Swimming and life saving.
- George Raymond Eustance. For services to the community in Merseyside.
- David Ronald Evans. For services to the community in North Monmouthshire.
- Lilian Amelia Everett, Headmistress, Highwood Special School, Purdown Hospital, Bristol.
- Edgar Henry Fagg, Professional & Technology Officer Grade I, Department of Health & Social Security.
- Norman Sydney Fairman, Chief Superintendent, Metropolitan Police.
- Kathleen Joyce Farr, lately Press Officer, National Headquarters, British Red Cross Society.
- Frank William Randall Fennell. For political and public services in East Anglia.
- Derek Risian Fenton, Deputy Commissioner, London (Prince of Wales's) District, St. John Ambulance Association and Brigade. For services to the resettlement of Ugandan Asians.
- George Francis Ferris. For services to dentistry in Woolwich.
- Dorothy Betty Field, Establishment and Press Officer, London Region, National Federation of Building Trades Employers.
- Frederick George Fogerty, Superintendent, Brighton and Peacehaven Factories, Flight Simulator Division, Redifon Ltd.
- Frank Reginald Francis, Secretary, Royal Association of British Dairy Fanners.
- George Lewis Thomas Francis, Production Manager, Systems & Weapons Division, Electrical & Musical Industries Electronics Ltd.
- Mary Geraldine Furley, Senior Personal Secretary, Department of the Environment.
- Frederick George Lock Gale, Professional & Technology Officer Grade I, Ministry of Defence.
- George Hope Galvin, Senior Executive Officer, Department of Health & Social Security.
- Queenie Garner, Centre Organiser, Stevenage Urban District, Women's Royal Voluntary Service.
- Jennifer Mary Garrod, Foreign & Commonwealth Office.
- Vincent Charles Arthur Giardelli. For services to Art in Wales.
- Alfreda Noelle Gibson, Sister, Intensive Care Unit, Royal Victoria Hospital, Belfast.
- George Alfred Glover, Chief Clerk, Clerk's Department, Rutland County Council.
- George Strachan Gordon, Assistant Chief Security Officer, United Kingdom Atomic Energy Authority.
- Harry Gosling, Education Welfare Officer, Warley Education Authority, Worcestershire.
- Lilias Violet Graham. For services to children in Glasgow.
- Kathleen Grant, Private Secretary, Greater London Council.
- William Grant, Chief Forester, Forestry Commission.
- Trevor Robert Gray. For services to hospital work in Wales.
- Arthur Grayson, Export Marketing Manager, TAC Construction Materials Ltd.
- Freda Gregson. For services to the community in Accrington.
- Beryl Irene Nicholson Grimble, Higher Executive Officer, Cabinet Office.
- Cynthia Mary Grose, lately Matron, Zachary Merton Maternity Hospital, Rustington.
- John Graham Groves, Resident Engineer, Littlehampton, Royal National Life-boat Institution.
- Reginald Hainsworth. For services to Cave Rescue.
- Edith Haley, BEM, Representative for Cumberland South, Regional Street, Village & Social Groups Savings Committee.
- Raymond Edward Hall, Professional and Technology Officer Grade I, Department of the Environment.
- William Ernest Hallam. For educational services at HM Prison, Sudbury, Derby.
- Thomas Alfred Leefe Ham. For political and public services in London.
- Megan Rhys Hammett, Senior Personal Secretary, Department of Health & Social Security.
- William Richard Harrison, Manager, Ship Design (Hull), Harland & Wolff Ltd., Belfast.
- The Reverend Sydney William Foster Hartnoll. For services to the Bristol Institute for the Deaf.
- Robert Haskins, Chairman, Abertillery & District Employment Committee.
- Michael Hawkes, Chairman, Gravesend & District Council for Community Relations.
- Derek Desmond Hemming. For services to youth in Dudley, Worcestershire.
- Timothy Hickey. For political and public services in Wales.
- Horace Edward Higgins, Secretary for Training, National Association of Boys' Clubs.
- Edmund Hill, Alderman, South Shields County Borough Council.
- Leslie Gordon Hill, Alderman, Bodmin Borough Council.
- Albert Frederick Hipwell, County Staff Officer Cadets (A), Warwickshire, St. John Ambulance Association and Brigade.
- Ida Hobbs, Emergency Services Organiser, North Midland Region, Women's Royal Voluntary Service. For services to the resettlement of Ugandan Asians.
- Betty Elaine Hodgkinson, Senior Examiner, Board of Inland Revenue.
- Major Cyril Arthur Hodgkinson, TD, Warden, Secondary English Language Centre, Derby.
- Lieutenant John Hodgson, RNR. For services to the Kingston Unit, Sea Cadet Corps.
- Margaret Hannah Holden, Assistant Mistress, Music, St. Catherine's School, Blackpool.
- Francis Henry Holman, Chairman of House Committee, Newton Abbot Hospital.
- Andrew Trotter Holmes, Telecommunications Manager, The Scotsman.
- Frederick Thomas Holmes, lately Assistant Registrar, Commonwealth War Graves Commission.
- William Miller Holmes, Observer Officer, 24 Group, Royal Observer Corps.
- William David Homewood, Land Reclamation Officer, Fife County Council.
- Thomas Hope, Theatre Superintendent, Ryhope General Hospital, County Durham.
- Grace Mildred Frith Horne. For political and public services in the Midlands.
- James Nuttall Horrocks, lately Executive Officer, Department of Health & Social Security.
- Florence Mary Howard, Swimming Instructress, Northampton Borough Council.
- David James Fletcher Hunt. For political services in the West of England.
- Leslie Hunter. For political and public services in Lancashire.
- Dorothy Lucy Odille Hutchinson. For services to No. 1218 Squadron, Air Training Corps.
- Kathleen Florence Huxtable, Inspector of Taxes (Higher Grade), Board of Inland Revenue.
- Anne Mary Hyde, Head of Airworthiness, Weybridge, British Aircraft Corporation Ltd. For services to Export.
- Josephine Susan Ives, lately Higher Executive Officer, Home Office.
- William Alexander Jackson, Head of Programme Services & Engineering, Scotland, British Broadcasting Corporation.
- Barbara Joan Jamieson, Organising Secretary, British Dietetic Association.
- Ronald Edward Jelley, Senior Executive Officer, Board of Customs & Excise.
- Alexander Anthony John, Programme Liaison Officer, Drama Department, Thames Television Ltd.
- Hilda Lorna Johnstone. For services to Riding.
- Arthur George Jones, lately Head Office Keeper, House of Commons.
- Clare Winifred Verne-Jones, Member, Sunderland Executive Council, National Health Service.
- Ethel Jane Jones, Matron, Manor Hospital, Great Sutton, Cheshire.
- John Ramsay Jones, Treasurer, United Manchester Hospitals.
- Margaret Marie English Richmond-Jones, lately Regional Emergency Welfare Organiser, Bristol, Women's Royal Voluntary Service.
- The Reverend Dr. Barnett Joseph. For services as hospital and prison chaplain.
- William Just, Higher Executive Officer, HM Treasury.
- Stefan Kaminski, lately Higher Executive Officer, Social Science Research Council.
- Cedric Kay, Divisional Surveyor (Motorways), Lancashire County Council.
- Henry William Kelly, School Care Worker, Acland Burghley School, London.
- William Ernest Kelly, Regional Commercial Manager, English Industrial Estates Corporation.
- Kathleen Mary Kennerell, Senior Executive Officer, Paymaster General's Office.
- James Christopher Kenyon, TD, National Savings District Member for Bury and Rochdale.
- Stanley Kermode. For services to the elderly in Christchurch, Hampshire.
- Norman Harry John Kevan, Traffic Manager, B.R.S. Parcels Ltd.
- Kathleen Elizabeth Rose Kirby, Higher Executive Officer, Board of Customs & Excise.
- Harry Ashworth Kitching, QPM, Deputy Chief Constable, City of Bradford Police.
- Dennis Charles Knight, Assistant Chief Officer, Surrey Fire Brigade.
- Miodrag Krsmanovic, Camp Leader, European Voluntary Workers Camp, Donnington, Ministry of Defence.
- Commander Leonard Claude Lawrance, RN, (Retd.). For social services in Weymouth, Dorset.
- Norah Frances Clark-Lawrence. For political and public services in London.
- Bryan Leaper, Investigation Officer, Central Headquarters, Post Office.
- Janet Bruce Leslie, Principal, Fife Pre-Nursing College.
- Francis Victor Leswell, Section Manager, Assembly Department, Plessey Avionics & Communications.
- William James Lettin, Higher Executive Officer, Board of Customs & Excise.
- Margaret Winifred Lewis. For services to the community in Lancaster and district.
- Lionel Hugh Lindsay, Secretary, Royal Metal Trades' Pension & Benevolent Society.
- Peter James Lingeman, Commercial Manager, Ruston-Bucyrus Ltd. For services to Export.
- Agnes Nicol Lottimer, Chief Computer Programmer, Scottish Region, British Railways Board.
- Stanley Charles Loweth, General Manager, Wolverhampton & District Trustee Savings Bank.
- William Trevor Luke, Engineer and Surveyor, Gelligaer Urban District Council.
- Cicely Alicia Winifred McCall. For services to the Norfolk & Norwich Association for Mental Health.
- Andrew McCron, Ex-Provost, Sanquhar Town Council.
- Captain Robert Angus McEachern, Master, MV Fingal (Lighthouse Tender) Northern Lighthouse Board.
- Peter McGibbon, formerly Customer Service Manager, Commercial Products, Tubes Division, British Steel Corporation.
- George MacKenzie MacKay, Head Warden and Forester, Box Hill, National Trust.
- Ian Arthur McKee, Sales Director, Methuen Educational Ltd.
- William Gray McKellar, Foreign & Commonwealth Office.
- Edward McLeay, Secretary, Federation of Associations of Materials Handling Manufacturers, Peat, Marwick, Mitchell & Co.
- Robert Stewart McMillan, Senior Assistant (Traffic), Merseyside Passenger Transport Executive.
- Hugh McRae. For services in psychiatric hospitals in Aberdeenshire.
- Major Tom Mann, General Secretary, The Border Regiment Association.
- Thomas Harold Margetts, Senior Nursing Officer, Church Hill House Hospital, Easthampstead, Berkshire.
- David Scott Marland. For political services in the Midlands.
- Barbara Constance Marley, Secretary, Negretti & Zambra Group.
- Margaret Catherine Martin, lately Senior Executive Officer, Ministry of Defence.
- Benjamin James Maslen. For services to Church Music in Bath.
- Charles Claude Matthews, Deputy Clerk to the Justices, Caerphilly Lower & Kibbor Petty Sessional Divisions.
- Louis Philip Mendels, Chairman and Managing Director, The New Consolidated Mines of Cornwall Ltd. For services to Export.
- Richard John Wenceslas Merchant, lately Secretary, Northern Division, Employers' Federation of Paper-makers & Boardmakers.
- Mabel Doris Merritt, Secretary, Guildford Auxiliary, Royal Society for the Prevention of Cruelty to Animals.
- Stanley Fisher Mills, Chief Warning Officer, York Group, United Kingdom Warning & Monitoring Organisation.
- Lawrence William Miner, Senior Shell Group Safety Adviser, Shell International Petroleum.
- John Fallows Moncrieff, lately Chairman, Folkestone Local Employment Committee.
- Hedwige Morris, Branch Officer, Essex, British Red Cross Society. For services to the resettlement of Ugandan Asians.
- Jean Daveena Ogilvy Morris. For services to housing, health and welfare in Scotland.
- George Murray, Foreign & Commonwealth Office.
- Richard Fisher Nicholson, Staff Officer, Ministry of Commerce for Northern Ireland.
- Robert Nicolson, Senior Executive Officer, Department of Health & Social Security.
- Patricia Anne Noble, Foreign & Commonwealth Office.
- Robert Noble, General Manager/Partner, Thomas Linton & Co., Glack, Limavady, County Londonderry.
- Edward Thomas Odgers, Probation Officer, Devon, Exeter, and Torbay Probation & After-care Service.
- Anne Jane Kathleen O'Hanlon, Sister, Accident & Emergency Department, Royal Victoria Hospital, Belfast.
- Margaret Ignatius O'Keefe, Nursing Supervisor, Honeywell Ltd.
- Captain John Orde, Master, MV Thebeland, Burnett Steamship Co. Ltd.
- Mary Katherine Lyndsay Orr. For services to the Glasgow & South East Scotland Branch, Navy League & Sea Cadet Corps.
- John Frederick Orridge, Industrial Relations Officer, G.E.C. Machines Ltd.
- Albert Ernest Page, Member, Portland Urban District Council.
- Alfred Hemingway Park, Chairman, Barnsley National Savings Education Committee.
- Herbert Edward Parke, Higher Executive Officer, Ministry of Defence.
- Grace Millicent Parker, Collector (Higher Grade), Board of Inland Revenue.
- James Parker, Senior Building Instructor, Fylde School, Blackpool.
- William Samuel Coldwell Partridge, Postal Executive A, Head Post Office, Birmingham.
- Captain Stephen Percy Pascoe, Commodore Master, Southampton, Isle of Wight & South of England Royal Mail Steam Packet Co. Ltd.
- Muriel Alice Pearcey, lately Assistant Mistress, Lynton Church of England Primary School, Devonshire.
- Arthur Pennington, Member, Bucklow Rural District Council, Cheshire.
- Amelia May Percival. For services to the Salterton Music & Youth Society, Grafton School, London.
- George Gabriel Petersen, Statistics Officer, Electricity Council.
- Alfred Sidney Phillips, Roll Shop Supervisory Manager, Bromford Iron & Steel Co. Ltd.
- Arthur Alexander Henry Phillips, Regional Education and Training Officer, South West Metropolitan Regional Hospital Board.
- Robert Philpott, Inspector of Taxes, Board of Inland Revenue.
- John Pimlett, Founder Member, Chelwood & District Welfare Association.
- Dorothea Louise Hamilton Pinder. For services particularly to local government in Tavistock.
- Hilary Jennifer Pole. For services to disabled people.
- Stanley Gordon York Pool, Chairman, Dundee Supplementary Benefits Appeal Tribunal.
- Lieutenant-Colonel Reginald James William Porcas, TD, National Secretary, Coal Trade Benevolent Association.
- Douglas Dorville Porter, Superintendent, Technical Services Department, Hawker Siddeley Aviation Ltd., Hatfield.
- Ernest Pownall, Deputy Chief Police Officer, Episkopi, Ministry of Defence.
- Alan Frank Poyser, Assistant Director, Social Services Department, Gloucester County Council.
- James Stuart Preston, Member, Schools Advisory Committee, National Savings Committee for Scotland.
- Laurie Purden (Roma Laurette Kotch), Editor, Good Housekeeping.
- Frank Vivian Hulley Ramsbottom. For services to the magistracy.
- Percy Albert Ratcliffe, Senior Executive Assistant, London Transport Executive.
- Ethel Rawkins, National Savings Street and Village Groups Representative, South Buckinghamshire.
- Olive Ray. For services to the elderly in Codsail, Staffordshire.
- William Alexander Thompson Rea. For services to agriculture in Northern Ireland.
- Geoffrey Hubert Read, Member, Salisbury & Wilton Rural District Council.
- William Henry Renfrew, Secretary, Harris Tweed Association Ltd. For services to Export.
- Arthur Thomson Rennie. For political and public services in Scotland.
- James Stuart Renton, Partner, Alan Reiach, Eric Hall & Partners, Architects, Edinburgh.
- Martin Alexander Reuter, DSM, BEM, Principal Doorkeeper, House of Lords.
- Frederick William Revell, Chief Engineer, Fisheries Research Vessel, Ministry of Agriculture, Fisheries & Food.
- Glyn Richards. For services to the magistracy.
- Jean Margaret Richards, Advisory Officer, Eastern Region, National Citizens Advice Bureau Council. For services to the resettlement of Ugandan Asians.
- James Combey Richardson, Technical Manager, Television Technical Operations, British Broadcasting Corporation.
- Isabella Robertson. For services to Golf.
- Charles Henry Rodgers, Chief Superintendent, Royal Ulster Constabulary.
- Cecil Erriest Rogers, Clerical Assistant, Lord Chancellor's Department.
- Kate Rogers, lately Matron, Allt-y-Mynydd Hospital, Llanybyther, Carmarthenshire.
- Alderman Matthew Eddy Rowe. For political and public services in the West Country.
- Eveline Emma Ruggles. For services to handicapped people.
- Christian Proudfoot Rutherford, Vice-Convener, Sutherland County Council.
- Arthur Lambert Sale, Divisional Officer Grade I, London Fire Brigade.
- John Charles Maxwell Savidge, National Savings District Member for Dorset.
- Hugh Ross Scorgie, Clerical Officer, Ministry of Defence.
- Albert George Sears, Senior Executive Officer, Department of Trade & Industry.
- Margaret Donaldson Selby, Higher Executive Officer, Crown Office, Scotland.
- Barbara Felicite Seymour, lately Higher Scientific Officer, East Malling Research Station, Maidstone.
- Mary Caroline Seymour, Membership Officer, Royal Agricultural Society of England.
- Patrick John Sheil, Warehouse Manager, HM Stationery Office.
- The Reverend Prebendary Cecil Gange Shipley, Chairman, South West Gloucestershire & North Somerset Youth Employment Committee.
- James Alexander Simpson, DSC, Trawler Skipper, Aberdeen.
- Michael Joseph Slevin, Superintendent, Royal Ulster Constabulary.
- Alexander Paton Smail, Chief Superintendent, Lothians & Peebles Constabulary.
- Iain Alastair Smith, General Manager, Royal Aberdeen Workshops for the Blind.
- John Francis Smith, Chairman, Skegness District Internal Drainage Board.
- Sidney James Wingrove Smith. For services to the Royal British Legion in Dorset.
- Thomas William Smith, Assistant Head Postmaster, Liverpool Post Office.
- Robert Ovens Sneddon, Senior Executive Officer, Department of Health & Social Security.
- John Vernon Snow, Docks Manager, Newport (Monmouthshire), British Transport Docks Board.
- Roland George Sparks, Chief Superintendent, Thames Valley Police.
- Winifred Stack, Clerical Officer, Ministry of Defence.
- Alexander Craig Steenson, Senior Executive Officer, Department of Health & Social Security.
- Henrietta Hamilton Stephen. For services to the Food Standards Committee.
- Charles William Coslett Stevens, Grade 3 Officer, Department of Employment.
- John Houston Stewart, Councillor, Stonehaven Town Council.
- Frederick Streeter. For services to Gardening.
- Barbara Isobel Sutton, County Borough Organiser, Coventry, Women's Royal Voluntary Service.
- Hemsley Swales, a founder Member & Secretary, Leeds Committee, Variety Club of Great Britain.
- James Sweeney, lately District Officer, HM Coastguard, Tynemouth, Department of Trade & Industry.
- Ralph Francis Newman Swingler, Chief of Technical Services Department, Hawker Siddeley Dynamics Ltd.
- Philinna Elsie May Taylor. For political and public services in the Midlands.
- Reginald Manuel Taylor, First Assistant District Engineer, Broadland District, Eastern Electricity Board.
- Vera Dorothy Taylor, Organiser, County and Large Burgh of Perth, Women's Royal Voluntary Service.
- Maureen Ellen Terry. For political services.
- Denis James Wilfred Thomas, Chief Librarian, Bristol Engine Division, Rolls-Royce (1971) Ltd.
- Margaret Tilley, lately Social Work Education Adviser, particularly in Scotland, Central Council for Education & Training in Social Work.
- Frederick Henry Toft, Sales Director, Denford Machine Tools, Ltd. For services to Export.
- Ivor Roy Tomlinson, Regional Supplies Officer, Sheffield Regional Hospital Board.
- Captain Thomas Tomlinson. For services to the Royal British Legion Scotland.
- Jean Elsie Treasurer, Senior Managing Clerk, Metropolitan Police Office.
- Alec Trussell, Chief Engineer, Customer Engineering Division, International Computers Ltd.
- Sarah Virginia Wade. For services to Lawn Tennis.
- Agnes Marion Walton, lately Matron, Brompton Hospital, London.
- Edward Joseph Ward, Senior Executive Officer, Department of Health & Social Security.
- Horace John Warlow, Senior Scientific Officer, Foreign & Commonwealth Office (Overseas Development Administration).
- Eileen May Warren, lately Grade 3 Officer, Department of Employment.
- Mary Veronica Waterworth, Administrative Supervisor, Typing & Printing Services, Oxford Regional Hospital Board.
- Alfred Charles Webb, President, Institute of Housing Managers.
- James Henry Weeks, DSM, Clerical Officer, HMS Cambria, Ministry of Defence.
- Florence Edith Whitehouse, Centre Superintendent, Nechells Green Health Centre, Birmingham.
- Alan Whittle, Director & Secretary, The National Hardware Alliance. For services to Export.
- Leonard Gilbert Whitwell, Regional Group Secretary, Public Services Section, Southern Region, Transport & General Workers Union.
- Gordon Edward Wightman, Bursar & Secretary, St. Catherine's School, Ventnor, Isle of Wight.
- Ernest Ronald Balmforth Willetts, Chairman & Managing Director, Industrial Foundry Material Ltd., Stourbridge. For services to Export.
- Oliver Idris Williams. For services to education & school sport in Harrow.
- Winifred Grace Emily Williams, Head Teacher, Freeland Church of England Primary School, Oxford.
- William Owen John Willmott, Divisional Movements Manager, South Western Division, Southern Region, British Railways Board.
- Leonard Wilson. For political and public services in Wessex.
- Robert Burgess Wilson, General Medical Practitioner, Peebles.
- Florence Wiltshire. For services to the Women's Royal Voluntary Service, London Borough of Brent.
- Edna Winstanley, Branch Secretary, South Yorkshire, British Red Cross Society.
- Sheila Elizabeth Winterbottom, Chaplain's Assistant, Ministry of Defence.
- Alexander Edward Wintle. For services to handicapped people in Portsmouth.
- Richard Wolsey, Town Clerk, Bangor, County Down.
- Arthur Wood. For political and public services in Yorkshire.
- William Everett Stimpson Wood, Divisional Officer Grade II, Fire Service Staff College.
- Frederick Harry Woodham, Executive Officer, Department of the Environment.
- Donald William James Woodman, BEM, Headmaster, Portadown College, County Armagh.
- Gerald Aubrey Woodward. For services to the community in Altrincham.
- John William Wootton, Chief Audiology Technician, Guy's Hospital, London.
- James Wright, Executive Officer, Department for National Savings.
- Bernard Rosser Young, Chairman and Managing Director, Selected Toys, Didcot. For services to Export.
- Brinley Blenman Young, Higher Executive Officer, Department of Health & Social Security.

===== Diplomatic Service & Overseas List =====
- John Rupert Abbott, Senior Water Engineer, Ministry of Works, Swaziland.
- The Reverend Charles Alexander Adams. For services to the community in St. Vincent.
- The Reverend Enoch Backford. For services to the community in the Bahama Islands.
- Robert Ethelbert Basden, JP. For public services in the Turks & Caicos Islands.
- Cyril Ross Handyside Baxter For services to education in Bahrain.
- Francis Turnbull Bell, TD, Assistant Auditor-General, Western State, Nigeria.
- Michael John Bennett, Passport Officer, British High Commission, Kampala.
- Anita Bezzina. For services to education in Gibraltar.
- Stanislaw Blaszka, Chief Rural Development Inspector, Kano State, Nigeria.
- Richard Norman Bowers, BEM, Director of Prisons, Botswana.
- Godwin Algernon Brathwaite, Permanent Secretary, Ministry of Communications & Works, Grenada.
- Bernard William Brookes. For services to British commercial interests in Belgium.
- Reginald Norman Brown, Accountant, HM Embassy, Paris.
- Ernest William Busby, Consul (Commercial), HM Consulate-General, Detroit.
- William Henry Charles Philip Carter, lately British Council Regional Director, Peshawar, Pakistan.
- (Sister) Rose-Mary Clifford. For services to education in Hong Kong.
- Robert Peter Coates. For services to medicine and the community in Zaire.
- Eric Cowley, lately Assistant Chief Mechanical Engineer, East African Railways.
- Chalmers Cresser, Quantity Surveyor, Ministry of Works, Lesotho.
- John Rutherford Da Breo, Permanent Secretary, Ministry of Health, Housing & Local Government, Grenada.
- Albert Alan Dalby, Principal Auditor, Botswana.
- William Henry Davies, lately Assistant Collector of Customs, Bermuda.
- Howard Dudley. For services to the British community in Nagpur, India.
- John Michael Dumoulin, Technical Assistant (Water), Public Works Department, Gibraltar.
- Pennell Manfred Duncan, Assistant Treasurer, St. Helena.
- Alfred John Edwin, Editor, Information Section, British High Commission, New Delhi.
- Frederick Gerald Evans, Principal Finance & Establishments Officer, Ministry of Agriculture, Malawi.
- Dudley John Gardiner. For welfare services to the community in Calcutta.
- William Gardner. For services to technical education in Nigeria.
- John Holden Lianga Gina. For services to culture in the British Solomon Islands Protectorate.
- William Edward Grainger. For services to medical research in Kenya.
- Winston Archibald Grant, Assistant Land Officer, Agriculture Department, British Honduras.
- Olive Winifred May Green. For services to nursing in the Lebanon.
- James Henry Greenaway, Superintendent of HM Prison, Montserrat.
- Joan Gruber. For services to education and the community in the British Solomon Islands Protectorate.
- Muriel Eleanor Hammond. For services to education in the Lebanon.
- Maude Elizabeth Hazlewood (Sister Romaine of St. Vincent). For welfare services to the community in Singapore.
- Margery Edith Heard. For services to health in the New Hebrides.
- Doris Joan Hill. For services to the British community in Athens.
- The Reverend Canon Edward Wilmot Gorham Holmes. For services to the community in the Bahama Islands.
- Philip Frederick Hopson, Mechanical Superintendent, Department of Agriculture, The Gambia.
- Kenneth John Ashby Hunt, lately HM Vice-Consul (Information), Cape Town.
- Jennifer June Drayson Irvine. For services to the British community in Ghana.
- Alexander Ivanoff. For services to British commercial interests in the U.S.A.
- Stanislaus Anthony James, lately Permanent Secretary, Ministry of Housing & Community Development, St. Lucia.
- William Spencer Jenkins, AFC, lately Archivist, HM Embassy, Helsinki.
- Frances Dorothy Johnston. For services to Anglo-Spanish relations and the British community in Malaga.
- Justin Ivor Hall Johnston. For services to the British community in Liberia.
- Angel Mary Babington Jones. For services to nursing in Natal, South Africa.
- Doris Janet Jones, Personal Assistant to HM Ambassador, Mogadishu.
- Pierre Michael Landell-Mills, Director of Economic Affairs, Botswana.
- John Lawson, Senior Roads Engineer, Ministry of Works, Swaziland.
- Thomas Loftus, lately Archivist, HM Embassy, Tripoli.
- Fitzgerald Raphael Louisy, Permanent Secretary, Ministry of Communications & Works, St. Lucia.
- Annie Mackinnon. For nursing and welfare services to the British community in Rio de Janeiro.
- Edgar Ulric McNamee. For services to the community in the Cayman Islands.
- Johanna Marie Macey, Archivist, HM Consulate-General, Zurich.
- Cyril Marlow, Senior Assistant Commissioner of Police, Malawi.
- Bindu Lai Mehra, lately Assistant Accountant, British High Commission, New Delhi.
- Adrian Christopher Bamford Millar. For services to the British community in Bombay.
- Mortimer Montgomery, lately First Secretary, British High Commission, Nicosia.
- Collin William Morrison. For services to the community in Hong Kong.
- Ian Martin Moxon, Pro-Consul, HM Consulate-General, Tangier.
- Edna Louise Nulens, Personal Assistant to HM Consul-General, Antwerp.
- John William Olivier, CPM, Assistant Commissioner of Police, Swaziland.
- Francisco Federico Orio. For services to the community in British Honduras.
- Evelyn Isabelle Teeft Parr, Clerk-Typist, HM Consulate-General, Cleveland.
- Marion Lumsden Peter. For services to nursing in Botswana.
- Thelma Ermintrude Philips. For services to culture in Grenada.
- Gayous Edmund Powell, ED. For public services in Bermuda.
- Irene Marianne Johanna Poznanski. For services to nursing in Senegal.
- Alan Prosser, Vice-Consul, HM Consulate-General, Hanoi.
- Ursula Lilia Raveneau, Clerk to the House of Assembly, St. Lucia.
- Derek Reed, lately Second Secretary (Commercial), HM Embassy, Bucharest.
- Sheilah Mary Nina Riepe. For services to education in the Caribbean.
- Helena Jones Robinson. For services to education in the Turks & Caicos Islands.
- Angus Mclntyre Rodgers, lately Goods Agent, East African Railways.
- William Howell Rotherham, Pro-Consul, HM Embassy, Montevideo.
- Thomas William Royans, Superintendent of Public Works, Falkland Islands.
- Arthur William Smith, lately Senior Marine Officer-Harbour Master, Marine Department, The Gambia.
- Roy Edward St. John, Chief Public Health Inspector, Grenada.
- Gordon Daniel Staple. For services to British commercial interests in Belgium.
- Maria Ferreira Pinto Basto Stilwell. For services to the British community in Portugal.
- Brian Thomson. For services to British commercial interests in Nigeria.
- Sidney John Towlson, British Trade Commissioner, Hong Kong.
- Morag Margaret Valentine, Personal Secretary to the late Sir Richard Sharples, KCMG, OBE, MC, Governor of Bermuda.
- Lawrence Edward Walker, First Secretary (Commercial), HM Embassy, Tripoli.
- Wong Shiu-cheuck. For services to the community in Hong Kong.
- John Michael Wood, Senior Education Officer, Ministry of Education, Kenya.
- William James Wood, MM. For services to Anglo-French relations in Calais.
- Olga Woodward, Personal Assistant to HM Minister, British Military Government, Berlin.

===== Australian States =====
====== State of New South Wales ======
- Andrew Elgar Vern-Barnett. For services to the community.
- Mildred Alice Barraclough. For services to the community.
- Marjorie Jean Barry. For services to nursing.
- Jack Malcolm Bayliss. For services to the community.
- The Reverend Roger Bush. For services to the community.
- John Ivan Charody. For services to industry.
- Councillor Francis George Clare. For services to local government.
- Alma Beryl Patricia Colvin. For services to the community.
- Alderman Michael Croot. For services to the community.
- William James Engel. For services to the community.
- Maria Gooma. For services to the community.
- Frank John Guthrie. For services to the community.
- John Edward Hallstrom. For services to the community.
- Alderman David Aberdeen Hay. For services to local government.
- Harry Reginald Hayes. For services to local government.
- Marjorie Alexandra Higgins. For services to the community.
- Henry James Hobbs. For services to the community.
- The Reverend Bernard George Judd. For services to the community.
- Rudolph John Komon. For services to the arts.
- Edgar Gordon McIntosh. For services to local government.
- Donald Fleay Melville. For services to the community.
- Ernest Henry Milton. For services to the community.
- Elizabeth Patricia Murray. For services to the community.
- Margaret Cathcart Nelson. For services to nursing.
- Kathleen Margaret Prescott. For services to the community.
- Walter Osmond Pye. For services to the community, especially in medicine.
- Edna Doreen Relton. For services to the Girl Guides Association.
- Donald Kilgour Rodgers. For services to journalism.
- Councillor Charles Henry Jarvis. For services to local government.
- Dorothy Mary Ryan. For services to the community.
- Mollie Johnstone Scott. For services to medicine in the field of nursing.
- Terrence Edward Smith. For services to the community.
- Alma Margaret Weiley. For services to the community.
- Herbert George Winders. For services to the community.

====== State of Victoria ======
- Frederick Joseph Allen, of Ashburton. For services to the community.
- Councillor William Michael Brady, of Gisborne. For services in local government and to the community.
- Alice Josephine Butler, of Tallangatta. For services to the community.
- Elizabeth May Cameron, of St. Arnaud. For services to the community and towards the welfare of Aboriginal women.
- John Albert Cashmore, of Hampton. For services to the Returned Services League, particularly in land settlement for returned servicemen.
- Arthur Roy Collins, JP, of Kangaroo Flat. For services in local government and to the community.
- Walter Connors, JP, of Lancefield. For services in local government and to the community.
- Reginald Keith Crow, JP, of Ormond. For services in the field of technical education, particularly in training young servicemen.
- Victor Hamilton French, of North Balwyn. For services to the community.
- Councillor Archibald John Girdwood, JP, of Eildon. For services in local government and to the community.
- Reginald Edward Gregory, JP, of Toorak. For services to the community.
- Sylvia Ismay Hampson, of Bendigo. For services to the community.
- Catherine McLeod Hemphill, of Rupanyup. For services to the community.
- Councillor Edward Henry Jones, of Carpendeit. For services in local government and to the community.
- Ronald Warren Jones, of Mitcham. For services to the Red Cross.
- Henry Senior Kaye, of Belgrave. For services to the community.
- John Watsford Lancaster, of Nathalia. For services in local government and to the community.
- John Thomas Leed, JP, of Pyramid Hill. For services in local government and to the community.
- Councillor Archibald Kingswell Lloyd, of Newtown. For services in local government and to the community.
- John Francis O'Hagan, of Brighton. For services to music as a composer.
- Councillor Alan Oswald Opie, JP, of Leitchville. For services in local government.
- Jean Elizabeth Peart, of Chines. For services to the community.
- Ellie Veronica Pullin, of Ringwood. For services to the community and in the pre-school field.
- Councillor Albert Leslie Roy, JP, of Eaglehawk. For services in local government and to the community.
- Councillor Colin White Scott, of Omeo. For services in local government and to the community.
- Councillor Bernard Milton Seebeck, JP, of Rowville. For services in local government and to the community.
- Mollie Sinclair, of Caulfield. For services to the community.
- George Stewart Smale, of Flinders. For services to education and the community.
- Phyllis Ethel Vardy, of Maffra. For services to the community.
- Edward McDonald Walker, of East Malvern. Formerly Divisional Engineer, State Rivers & Water Supply Commission.
- John Harold Wass, JP, of East Coburg. For services to the community.
- Kenneth Wright, JP, of Doncaster. For services to the community.

====== State of Queensland ======
- Edwin James Beardmore, of St. George. For services to the Parliament of Queensland and to local government.
- Daniel Augustine Connolly, of Warwick. For services in local government to the community and charity.
- Ivy Annie Kamholtz, of Kingaroy. For services to the Red Cross and the community.
- John Frederick Keays, of Ascot. For services to engineering and development.
- Edward William George MCamley, of Dululu. For services to the grazing industry and to agricultural show societies.
- Councillor Fergus William McFadzen, of Sarina. For services to the dairying industry and local government.
- James Thomson Robertson, of Innisfail. For services to the community.
- Isabell Susan Stocker, of Murarrie. For services to ex-prisoners of war and the community.

=== Order of the Companions of Honour (CH) ===
- Bernard Howell Leach, CBE. For services to the Art of Pottery.
- Dame Irene Mary Bewick Ward, DBE, MP. For political and public services.

=== Companion of the Imperial Service Order (ISO) ===
==== Home Civil Service ====
- Reginald Thomas Vernon Amery, Superintending Quantity Surveyor, Department of Health & Social Security.
- Harold Norman Atkinson, lately Principal, Department of the Environment.
- Edward William Bryant, Principal Professional & Technology Officer, Ministry of Defence.
- William John Derbyshire, Principal, Civil Service Department.
- Brian Frederick Fallon, Senior Inspector of Taxes, Board of Inland Revenue.
- Clarence Eric Goodliffe, Exhibition Officer, Safety in Mines Research Establishment, Department of Trade & Industry.
- John Frederick Graber, HM Inspector, Department of Education & Science.
- Doris Isabel Huber, Senior Principal, Department of Trade & Industry.
- Geoffrey Maurice Kirby, Principal, Board of Inland Revenue.
- Reginald Wilfrid Ley, Principal, Ministry of Defence.
- John McIntyre, lately Inspector, Scottish Prison Service.
- Hilda Marshall, Senior Principal, Department of Health & Social Security.
- Clarice Winifred Murray, Principal, Department of the Environment.
- Leonard Alfred Cooper Newns, Senior Principal, Department of Trade & Industry.
- Kenneth Wilfred Peace, lately Principal, Royal Ordnance Factory, Patricroft, Ministry of Defence.
- James Reid, Superintending Valuer, Ministry of Finance for Northern Ireland.
- Lionel Samuel Robb, Foreign & Commonwealth Office.
- Henri Brian Rowles, Principal Scientific Officer, Ministry of Defence.
- William Henry John Sharp, Principal Collector of Taxes, Board of Inland Revenue.
- Leo James Shew, Senior Inspector, Board of Customs & Excise.
- Iris Alice Jessie Veevers, lately Principal, Ministry of Defence.
- Ernest Harold Walker, Superintending Electrical Engineer, Department of the Environment.

==== Diplomatic Service & Overseas List ====
- Malcolm MacDonald Swan, Principal Executive Officer, Colonial Secretariat, Hong Kong.

==== Australian States ====
===== State of New South Wales =====
- Jack Hayward Watson, Registrar-General.

===== State of Victoria =====
- Frederick Henry Brooks, lately Director-General of Education.

===== State of Queensland =====
- Leslie Edward Skinner, Under Secretary, Department of Justice.

=== British Empire Medal (BEM) ===
==== Military Division ====
===== Royal Navy =====
- Chief Petty Officer John Rigby Beard, J900SS9Y.
- Chief Radio Supervisor Robert Mountser Bonny, JX14S190.
- Chief Petty Officer Writer Brian George Cornner, M920138J.
- Mechanician First Class Robert Coupland, D0S4635R.
- Colour Sergeant James Curran, P012169T.
- Chief Petty Officer Steward John Gwilliam Ellis, L894089W.
- Leading Seaman Keith Ronald Fear, D074109D,
- Head Naval Nurse Honor Louise Fortune, Y0000018S.
- Chief Petty Officer Joiner Stanley Reginald Gilbert, M7S9019R.
- Aircraft Artificer (AE) First Class Ronald Walter Gourlay, F8S5S17K.
- Corporal William Holden, R003417Y.
- Chief Petty Officer Stores Accountant Gerald Ralph Hooper, M832S84S.
- Chief Petty Officer (Careers Adviser) Laurence Alexander Hunter, J143269D.
- Chief Ordnance Electrical Artificer John Anthony Thomas Johnson, M818572T.
- Chief Marine Engineering Artificer (H) Robert William Johnson, M896133S.
- Corporal Ronald Victor Legg, P014814T.
- Chief Radio Electrician William Lovejoy, Q991475.
- Chief Petty Officer Clearance Diver First Class Julian Macrae-Clifton, J826675Y.
- Communications Yeoman Brian Richard Nabbs, J951152J.
- Aircraft Mechanician (AE) First Class George Oliver Robb, F967995W.
- Chief Mechanician Frederick Noel Roberts, K949468N.
- Petty Officer Cook Cyril Robinson, M870192W.
- Chief Marine Engineering Artificer (P) William John Rogers, H8S7579V.
- Aircraft Mechanician (AE) First Class John McWilliam Scott, F837859G.
- Chief Petty Officer Eric Ronald Shepherd, J819706A.
- Master at Arms George David Summers, M838085J.
- Chief Petty Officer George Button, J161117S.
- Petty Officer Marine Engineering Mechanic Peter John Button, K902735X.
- Chief Aircraft Mechanician (AE) John Alwyn Trimby, F872983X.

===== Army =====
- 13110918 Staff Sergeant James Anderson, Royal Corps of Transport, Territorial & Army Volunteer Reserve.
- 23744751 Staff Sergeant Peter Robert Appleton, Royal Corps of Signals.
- 22170974 Staff Sergeant Donald James Beaton, Royal Army Ordnance Corps.
- 24064998 Sergeant Anthony Clark Cundy, Wessex Regiment, Territorial & Army Volunteer Reserve.
- 22052968 Warrant Officer Class 2 (Local) George Frederick Denford, Army Catering Corps, Territorial & Army Volunteer Reserve.
- 23677411 Staff Sergeant Edward Thomas Dorsett, Corps of Royal Electrical & Mechanical Engineers.
- 23395262 Warrant Officer Class 2 (Acting) Joseph Eastwood, The Royal Regiment of Fusiliers.
- 23859518 Staff Sergeant John Colin Essery, Corps of Royal Engineers.
- 22954779 Staff Sergeant Thomas George Payers, Royal Corps of Signals.
- 22266634 Sergeant Vincent Goodwin, Grenadier Guards.
- 22845232 Staff Sergeant Robert Graham, Corps, of Royal Engineers.
- 23691681 Sergeant William George Graham, Royal Regiment of Artillery, Territorial & Army Volunteer Reserve.
- 2670884 Staff Sergeant Gordon Robert Grayson, Coldstream Guards.
- 23503396 Staff Sergeant (Acting) Douglas Philip Harvey, The Argyll & Sutherland Highlanders (Princess Louise's).
- 21147426 Warrant Officer Class 2 (Acting) Hastabahadur Rai, 7th Duke of Edinburgh's Own Gurkha Rifles.
- 23910650 Sergeant Trevor Henry, The Parachute Regiment.
- 23252332 Staff Sergeant Peter Hodgkinson, Grenadier Guards.
- 23622315 Staff Sergeant Robert Edward William Kennard, Corps of Royal Electrical & Mechanical Engineers.
- 23700079 Staff Sergeant (Local) Robert Alexander McBrtde, Corps of Royal Military Police.
- 23871042 Corporal Alexander McNeill, Royal Army Veterinary Corps.
- 23472058 Staff Sergeant Thomas Alexander Moore, Corps of Royal Engineers.
- 22232686 Staff Sergeant James Kay Norie, Royal Army Ordnance Corps.
- 23954371 Corporal Michael Desmond Norton, Corps of Royal Engineers.
- 2741847 Staff Sergeant Kenneth Parry, Welsh Guards.
- W/433750 Sergeant Agnus June Ohagan Prentice, Women's Royal Army Corps.
- 22401381 Staff Sergeant (Acting) Denis John Prince, Corps of Royal Electrical & Mechanical Engineers.
- 22358450 Staff Sergeant Edward Charles Reeve, Royal Regiment of Artillery.
- 23847844 Staff Sergeant Brian Arthur Rice, Royal Corps of Signals.
- 23714433 Sergeant John Francis Rigby, Army Catering Corps, Territorial & Army Volunteer Reserve.
- 24009403 Lance Corporal Barry Colin Spike, Corps of Royal Engineers.
- 22826366 Staff Sergeant Alfred Tasker, The Royal Anglian Regiment.
- 23533133 Staff Sergeant Colin Temple, Royal Army Pay Corps.
- 22482888 Sergeant Joseph Tohill, Royal Army Pay Corps.
- 24003305 Staff Sergeant (Acting) Richard Gibb Whiteford, The King's Own Royal Border Regiment.

===== Royal Air Force =====
- X0575573 Flight Sergeant Clarence Edward Alexander Aldridge.
- T0585450 Flight Sergeant Peter Edwin Cass.
- C1921896 Flight Sergeant Geoffrey Sidney Peter Dimmer.
- K4007996 Flight Sergeant Patrick Joseph Fogarty, RAF Regiment.
- T4117601 Flight Sergeant Peter Alfred Johnson.
- E0537978 Flight Sergeant James McClure.
- PI920961 Flight Sergeant Peter Richards.
- D0584158 Flight Sergeant Alexander Russell.
- Y1235138 Flight Sergeant William Edward Smith.
- HI397419 Flight Sergeant Ernest Albert Steer.
- Y0583346 Flight Sergeant William Tait.
- Y2214212 Flight Sergeant William Henry Taylor.
- Y1920592 Flight Sergeant Harry Webster.
- H2520591 Flight Sergeant Robert George Westwood, RAF Regiment.
- N4004964 Flight Sergeant George Willers.
- Y4158097 Acting Flight Sergeant Jeffrey Leonard Cresswell.
- W1928708 Acting Flight Sergeant John William Dicks.
- H4236872 Acting Sergeant David Ernest Hawley.
- F2576402 Acting Flight Sergeant Andrew Robertson, RAF Regiment.
- P4118496 Acting Flight Sergeant Geoffrey Sydney John Rowe.
- D5011556 Chief Technician Ronald Antill.
- F0589625 Chief Technician Brian Bassett.
- H4036667 Chief Technician William Joseph Milburn.
- Q2518913 Sergeant Eric Sydney Baker.
- E4124660 Sergeant Arthur Harold Brown.
- GOS93778 Sergeant Francis Anthony Carroll.
- U42S7237 Sergeant David Dickinson.
- X3011959 Sergeant Edwin Albert Dyer.
- X4262298 Sergeant David Anthony McCrossan, for services with the Singapore Armed Forces.
- U0592979 Sergeant David Arthur Marshall.
- Y1942463 Acting Sergeant Colin Geoffrey Lamper.
- K2826766 Acting Sergeant Judith Mary Leach, Women's Royal Air Force.
- Q4098100 Acting Sergeant Joseph Proctor, RAF Regiment.
- M4250541 Acting Sergeant Ian Rudling.
- J5059930 Corporal Anthony Dyer.
- N4239740 Corporal Ian Charles Simpson.

==== Civil Division ====
===== United Kingdom =====
- George Alexander, Professional & Technology Officer, Grade IV, Ministry of Defence.
- Henry William Alston, Shipwright, F. T. Everard & Sons Ltd., Greenhithe, Kent.
- George Anderson, Donkeyman/Greaser, SS Benlawers, Ben Line Steamers, Wm. Thomson & Co.
- Mary Beeby Armstrong, National Savings Group Collector, Norwich.
- Wilfred James Banger, Steward, Trinity House Pilot Vessel Service.
- Agnes Ferguson Beattie, Group Collector, Street Savings Group, Belfast.
- Arthur Harry Beckley, Sub-Officer, Oxfordshire Fire Brigade.
- Frederick William Bee, lately Foreman Woodworking Machinist, H. Hough & Co. Ltd., Hoylake Cheshire.
- Muriel Mary Bennett, Centre Organiser, Biggleswade Urban District, Women's Royal Voluntary Service.
- Reginald Stanley Billings, Inspector, Kensington Sub District Office, London Postal Region, Post Office.
- James Birmingham, Deputy, Agecroft Colliery, North Western Area, National Coal Board.
- Thomas Herbert Boyle, Assistant Foreman, Hawker Siddeley Aviation Ltd., Kingston upon Thames.
- Jean Bradford, National Savings Street Groups Collector, New Radnor, Radnorshire.
- Robert Wesley Bridger, Telephone Operator, British Film Institute.
- Doris Bristow, Senior Overlooker, Royal Ordnance Factory, Glascoed, Ministry of Defence.
- George Henry Broadhurst, Overman, Donisthorpe Colliery, South Midlands Area, National Coal Board.
- Leonard Brown, Public Service Vehicle Driver, Yorkshire Traction Co. Ltd., Barnsley.
- Herbert Frederick Buckle, Driver, Ministry of Defence.
- Hilda Constance Bury, Woman Police Constable, City of Dundee Police Force.
- George David Butcher, MM, Chargehand, South Western Electricity Board.
- Ronald William Cackett, Salvage Diver, HM Marine Salvage Services, Ministry of Defence.
- Robert Campbell, Senior Day Foreman, Ravenscraig Works, Strip Mills Division, British Steel Corporation.
- Sydney Chapman, Works Foreman, Dale Electric International Ltd., Filey. For services to Export.
- William Ernest Hathaway Cheape, Paperkeeper, Family Division, Royal Courts of Justice.
- Stanley Herbert Chinton, Foreign & Commonwealth Office.
- Percy Clapham, Postman Higher Grade, Knaresborough Post Office.
- Collins Barnett Coates, Motor Mechanic, Teesmouth Life-Boat, Royal National Life-Boat Institution.
- Doris Mary Cook, Emergency Training Organiser, Lincs/Lindsey County, Women's Royal Voluntary Service.
- Henry James Muir Craig, Tanker Driver, Shell-Mex & B.P. Ltd., Belfast Terminal.
- Reuben Thomas Crookes, Machine Assistant, London Transport Executive.
- Olive Muriel Cubitt, Group Leader, Norfolk Branch, British Red Cross Society.
- George Thomas Currey, Craftsman Class II (Fitter), Department of the Environment.
- Mavis Sonya Davidson, Emergency Service Organiser, Dorset, Women's Royal Voluntary Service.
- John Devaney, Welder/Fabricator, Paints Division, Imperial Chemical Industries Ltd.
- George Stanley Hawkewell Dovener, Commandant, Leeds City Police Special Constabulary.
- Alice Celia Edmunds, Cleaner, Crawley Boys' Club.
- Richard Herbert Elston, Craftsman II, Radio & Space Research Station, Science Research Council.
- Alfred Elvin, Head Caretaker, Boston High School for Girls, Lincolnshire.
- Walter Evington, Chargehand Bricklayer, Geo. Houlton & Sons Ltd., Hull.
- Leonard Farrell, Maintenance Electrician, Capenhurst Works, British Nuclear Fuels Ltd.
- Kenneth Walter Farthing, Experimental Flying Control Assistant, Air Traffic Control, Royal Aircraft Establishment, Farnborough, Ministry of Defence.
- Sydney Thomas Fisher, General Worker, Bolsover Colliery, North Derbyshire Area, National Coal Board.
- Anna Ursena Ford, lately Home Help, Chalfont St. Peter, Buckinghamshire.
- Wallace Edmund Francis, General Duty Orderly, Royal Army Chaplains Department Centre, Ministry of Defence.
- George Gloyn Friend, Service Layer, Plymouth District, South Western Gas, British Gas Corporation.
- Barbara Mary Fry, Assistant Scientific Officer, Rosewarne Experimental Horticulture Station, Ministry of Agriculture, Fisheries & Food.
- Jessie Isabel Gatiss, National Savings Street Group Collector, Crook, County Durham.
- George Edward Godden, Process & General Supervisory Grade IV, Ministry of Defence.
- Walter Gooderham, Staff Sergeant Instructor, Combined Cadet Force, Taunton School.
- Charles Edward Grebby, Steward Grade II, RAF College of Air Warfare, Ministry of Defence.
- Thomas Francis Greenhill, Land Preventive Man, Board of Customs & Excise.
- Susan Victoria Maud Gregory, School Crossing Patrol, Metropolitan Police.
- Edward Charles Groves, Head Stockman, Free Town, Herefordshire.
- Frederick Alexander Gusanie, Senior Chainman, Valuation & Estates Department, Greater London Council.
- Alexander Haig, lately Senior Foreman of Works, Scottish Prison Service.
- Lionel Norton Hall, Driver, Doncaster Branch, North Eastern British Road Services Ltd.
- Reginald John Hammond, Chief Warder, British Museum.
- Arthur Edward Harper, Market Porter, Covent Garden.
- Charles Augustus Harris, lately Captain, 2nd Andover Company, Boys' Brigade.
- John Henry Harris, lately Courier, British Council.
- John Hay, Senior Foreman, Periscope Department, Barr & Stroud Ltd., Glasgow.
- Francis Patrick Hayes, Section Leader, Northern Ireland Fire Authority.
- Clive Haywood, Chief Observer, H.Q. No. 15 Group, Bawtry, Royal Observer Corps.
- Marjorie Lilian Heald, Leading Control Operator, Rotherham Fire Brigade.
- William James Heffernan, Office Keeper, Charity Commission.
- Patrick Michael Hegarty, Station Officer, Belfast Fire Brigade.
- George William Heron, lately Head Waiter, Lloyd's of London.
- James Hildreth, Foreman, Whessoe Systems & Controls Ltd., Darlington.
- Ivan Lancaster Hogg, Radio Services Shift Supervisor, Metropolitan Police.
- Frederick Henry William Holland, Head Porter, All Saints Hospital, Southwark, London.
- Eric Hollingsworth, Installation Inspector, South Eastern Electricity Board.
- William George Talbot Holmes. For services to the Salvation Army.
- Leslie John Honeyball, Caretaker, Ickworth House, The National Trust, Suffolk.
- Edna May Howells, Forewoman, G.E.C, (Radio & Television) Ltd., Hirwaun, Glamorgan.
- Hilda Hughes, Mess Hand, RAF Officers' Mess, Farnborough, Ministry of Defence.
- Idris Hughes, Driver, Oxford Branch, Midlands British Road Services Ltd.
- Raymond Joseph Hughes, Constable, Royal Ulster Constabulary.
- Charles Amos Hunt, Works Convenor, Derby Engine Division, Rolls-Royce (1971) Ltd.
- David Hurley, Messenger, Welsh Office.
- Walter Joseph Hutchings, Surveyor Basic Grade, Ordnance Survey.
- Kathleen Ingersoll. For services to the community in Rustington, Sussex.
- William Jackson, Stevedoring Foreman, Manchester Ship Canal Co.
- Ellen Maud Jerome, lately Waitress, City of London Club.
- Freda Mary Jobson, National Savings Street Groups Collector, Whitchurch, Hampshire.
- Francis Frederick Jones, Foreman Grade 1, South Western Regional Headquarters, Central Electricity Generating Board.
- Mary Davidson Lamb, Collector, Street Savings Group, Dunbar, East Lothian.
- William Hezikiah Lambert, Railway Shopman, Category 4 (Fitter), Rolling Stock Maintenance Section, Southern Region, Salisbury, British Railways Board.
- John Robert Lane, Planning Engineer, Mechanical Division, Westland Helicopters Ltd., Yeovil.
- Thomas Leighton, Sub-Officer, West Riding of Yorkshire Fire Brigade.
- James Alfred Lewis, Boilermaker, Ministry of Defence.
- Thomas Liddell, Professional & Technology Officer, Grade III, Ministry of Defence.
- John Alexander Lindsay, Chief Officer, HM Prison, Liverpool.
- William Liston, Pressman, St. Stephen's Parliamentary Press, HM Stationery Office.
- Charles Henry Ludlow, Chief Office Keeper, HM Treasury.
- Mavis Adella, Mrs, Lynham, Telephonist, Cardiff Marine Survey Office, Department of Trade & Industry.
- Thomas Middleton Lytham, County Staff Officer, County of Essex, St. John Ambulance Association and Brigade.
- Josephine McAteer, Cleaner, Board of Customs & Excise.
- Murdoch McKinnon, House Officer, Clyde Port Authority.
- Mary Maclean, Kitchen Supervisor, School Meals Central Kitchen, Johnstone, Renfrewshire.
- Thomas Anthony McLean, Soap Reception Operator, Hard Soaps Department, Lever Bros. Ltd., Port Sunlight, Cheshire.
- John Mcneill, Manager, Central Messing Store, Navy, Army & Air Force Institutes, Lisburn, Northern Ireland.
- David Andrew McQuitty, Chief Security Officer, Belfast Hospital Management Committee.
- James Mann, Chargehand Inspector, Ferranti Ltd., Edinburgh.
- Raymond William Maries, Chief Petty Officer Instructor, Shirley (Midland Area), Sea Cadet Corps.
- Thomas Markinson, Chief Meter Inspector, Leeds Area, North Eastern Gas, British Gas Corporation.
- Walter Frederick Martin, Auxiliary Coastguardsman-in-Charge, Sea Palling, Norfolk, HM Coastguard.
- John William Mason, Constable, Sheffield & Rotherham Constabulary.
- Richard Frederick Mealings, Divisional Commander, Birmingham City Special Constabulary.
- Florence Ruth Mole, Centre Organiser, Filey, East Riding of Yorkshire, Women's Royal Voluntary Service.
- James Moody, Chief Officer (Class I), Northern Ireland Prison Service.
- William Harry Moody, Blast Furnace Helper, Appleby Frodingham Works, General Steels Division, British Steel Corporation.
- Mary Moran, Group Officer, South-Eastern Area Fire Brigade (Scotland).
- William George Mortar, lately Chargehand, Fareham Urban District Council.
- John Thomas Morten, Foreman, Plating Shop, Radar & Equipment Division, Electrical Musical Industries Electronics Ltd.
- Winifred Mary Myers, Head Cook, House of Lords.
- Herbert John Newman, Custodian, Arlington Court, near Barnstaple, Devon, The National Trust.
- John Eben Paine, Constable, Metropolitan Police.
- Lillian Harriet May Palmer. For services to the Hospital Service in Cardiff.
- Percy Louis William Parfitt, Government Industrial Pests Operator Foreman, Ministry of Agriculture, Fisheries & Food.
- Hairy Parker, Feeder, Temper Mills, Velihdre Works Strip Mills Division, British Steel Corporation.
- Robert Hanson Pashley, Professional & Technology Officer, Grade III, Royal Ordnance Factory, Blackburn, Ministry of Defence.
- Alfred John Pengelly, lately Inshore Fishing Vessel Skipper/Owner, Looe, Cornwall.
- William Gardener Pennock, Boatswain, Christian Salveson & Co. Ltd.
- Mary Amelia Powell. For services to the Girl Guide Movement in Cardiff.
- Daniel Quinn, General Foreman, Central Production Station, Hartlepool, Northern Gas, British Gas Corporation.
- Walter James Raymond, Process & General Supervisor Grade V, Ministry of Defence.
- Lilian Mary Reynolds, Assistant Manager, Catering, Television Service, British Broadcasting Corporation.
- Donald Ivor Ernest Richards, Aircraft Fitter, 781 Squadron, HMS Daedalus, Ministry of Defence.
- Norman Risk, Site Foreman, F. W. Clifford Ltd., Purley, Surrey. For services to export.
- James Henry Roberts, Groupage Superintendent, Lawther & Harvey Ltd., Belfast.
- Adrian Richard Robinson, Sergeant, Royal Ulster Constabulary.
- William Rose, Technical Officer, Aberdeen Telephone Area, Post Office.
- Frederick Sadler, Sergeant Major Instructor, Army Cadet Force, Manchester.
- Eve Seebold. For services to the community in Brancaster Staithe, Norfolk.
- James Rowland Shearman, Inspector, Metropolitan Police Special Constabulary.
- Donald Shenton, Relief Signalman, Moorthorpe, Eastern Region, British Railways Board.
- Kenneth James Shortman, Furniture Maker, Remploy, Bristol.
- Charlotte Skibben, Telephone Operator, Leeds Employment Exchange, Department of Employment.
- Florence Skitt, Supervisor, M. M. Bell & Sons Ltd., Sheffield.
- Joseph Smith, Bus Driver, SELNEC Passenger Transport Executive.
- Leslie George Smith, Sergeant, Metropolitan Police.
- Walter Smith, Commandant, East Riding of Yorkshire, British Red Cross Society.
- Richard Sneddon, Commandant, Linlithgow, West Lothian, British Red Cross Society.
- Marcus Sidney Snow, Acting Supervisor, Southern Gas, British Gas Corporation.
- Alexander Russell Sowersby, Senior Paper Keeper, Board of Inland Revenue.
- Richard George Spittle, Chargehand (Electrician), Department of the Environment.
- Horace Stapenell, Ambulance Driver, Birmingham.
- Jack Strickland, lately Horsekeeper, Whitbread & Co. Ltd.
- Edna Chapman Stubbs, Head Cook,.Catering Department, General Hospital, Bishop Auckland, County Durham.
- Walter James Sullivan, Sergeant, Metropolitan Police.
- Alexander Swan, Fireman, Belfast Fire Brigade.
- George Albert Swanton, Storeman Grade A, Royal Mint.
- Thomas Symons, Head Custodian, Scarborough Castle, Department of the Environment.
- Kathleen Winifred Taylor, Senior Drawing Office Assistant, Canterbury Telephone Area, Post Office.
- Freda Dalton Thompson, lately Centre Organiser, Buxton, Derbyshire, Women's Royal Voluntary Service.
- Bernard Edward Thorp, Leading Hand Electrician, Television News, British Broadcasting Corporation.
- Albert George Frederick Tidd, Senior Technician, Brighton Telephone Area, Post Office.
- William Edward Torkington, Skilled Fitter, Hawker Siddeley Dynamics Ltd., Hatfield, Hertfordshire.
- Kenneth Charles Twaite, Chief Inspector (Postal), Head Post Office, Peterborough.
- Thomas Tyrrell, Fitter, Brown Brothers & Co. Ltd., Rosebank Ironworks, Edinburgh.
- Ellen Dorothea Vincent, National Savings Street Groups Collector, Eastbourne.
- William Hamilton Wain, Sergeant, Liverpool & Bootle Constabulary.
- Charles Henry Waldron, Chief Steward Grade I, H.Q. Mess, Royal Engineers, Ministry of Defence.
- Elsie Margaret Walker, Cleaner, Nottingham Hospital for Women.
- James Walker, Power Loader Operator, Kibblesworth Colliery, North Durham Area, National Coal Board.
- Leslie Liddle Walker, lately Boatswain, SS Windsor Castle, British & Commonwealth Shipping Co. Ltd.
- Joyce Elise Wallis, Emergency Welfare Organiser, Essex, Women's Royal Voluntary Service.
- Jane Blanshard Ward, County Emergency Services Organiser, West Kent, Women's Royal Voluntary Service.
- Edna Warner, Chief Woman Observer, No. 23 Group, Durham, Royal Observer Corps.
- James Milne Watt, Herring Cooper, Peterhead.
- William George Watts, Foreman, Installation Inspection, Meter Fixing Section, London Electricity Board.
- Beatrice Ellen Webber, National Savings School & Village Groups Collector, Sidmouth, Devonshire.
- Francis Sladden Wells, Foreman, E. Saunders Ltd., Electrical Engineers, Margate, Kent.
- Leslie Arthur Welsh, Driver, Warren Spring Laboratory, Department of Trade & Industry.
- Margaret McDiarmid West, Supervisor (Female staff), Tullis Russell & Co. Ltd., Markinch, Fifeshire.
- John George Whitcombe, Chief Photoprinter, Staff College, Camberley, Ministry of Defence.
- Ralph Frank White, Head Gardener, National Institute of Agricultural Engineering, Wrest Park, Silsoe, Bedfordshire.
- Winifred Doris White. For services to Help Unlimited, Staines, Middlesex.
- John Frederick Williams, Foreman Carpenter, East Moors Works, General Steels Division, British Steel Corporation.
- Wesley Henry William Williams, Progress Chaser, Tecalemit (Engineering) Ltd., Plymouth, Devonshire.
- Minnie Willie, National Savings Village Group Collector, South Holderness.
- William James Wilson, Senior Ambulance Driver, Northern Ireland Hospitals Authority.
- Christopher Plomer Wren, Photoprinter, Explosives Research & Development Establishment, Waltham Abbey, Ministry of Defence.
- William Percy Wright, Senior Foreman, Finishing Shop, Marconi Space & Defence Systems Ltd.

===== Overseas Territories =====
- Cheng Yat-wah, Senior Demarcator, New Territories Administration, Hong Kong.
- Augustus Francis, lately Senior Prisons Officer, St. Lucia.
- Ulric Derrington Gibson, Principal Keeper, Imperial Lighthouse Service, Bahama Islands.
- Gun Yung, Foreman Class I, Public Works Department, Hong Kong.
- Matata Ionatana, Housing Area Overseer, Ocean Island, Gilbert & Ellice Islands Colony.
- Glenys Jones. For services to sport for paraplegics in Gibraltar.
- John Martinez, Forest Ranger, British Honduras.
- Ruth Symonette. For services to the community in the Bahama Islands.
- George Tara, Senior Marine Engineer, British Solomon Islands Protectorate.
- Valerie Olympia Thomas. For services to the community in the British Virgin Islands.
- Wong Hok-ling, Head Attendant, Commerce & Industry Department, Hong Kong.

===== Australian States =====
====== State of New South Wales ======
- Brenda Somerville Backhouse. For services to the community.
- Roy Albert Harris Balcomb. For services to primary production.
- Joyce Isabel Barlow. For services to the community in Mungihdi.
- Councillor William Sydney Brennan. For services to local government.
- Norah Catherine Busch. For services to the community in Lismore.
- Ronald Keith Carberry. For services to the Royal Society for Prevention of Cruelty to Animals.
- (Sister) Mary Eleanor Chrisp. For services to nursing.
- William Rowlands Clague, Chief Splintmaker, Royal Alexandra Hospital for Children.
- John England Clifton. For services to the community in Crookwell.
- Louise Emma May Cowpe. For services to the community.
- Redvers Henry Darch. For services to local government.
- James Charles Duffy. For services in the field of Civil Defence.
- Alderman Franklin Saxby Edwards. For services to local government.
- John Edward Evans. For services to the community.
- Richard Harris Fayle. For services to the community in Glen Innes.
- Russell James Ferguson, Car Driver to the Premier of New South Wales.
- Leonard Edgar Forsythe. For services to the Navy League Cadet Movement.
- Councillor James Leo Garvey. For services to local government.
- Henry Ernest Chatfield Gjedsted, ED. For services to ex-servicemen.
- Archibald James Gray. For services to history.
- Lancelot Keith Gregory. For services to the community especially to youth.
- Margaret Jane Harris. For services to the community.
- Albert George Hawkins. For services to the community.
- Walter Charles Horne, Chief Wardsman, Sutherland Hospital.
- Albert Campbell Morgan Howard. For services to education.
- Thomas Henry Lawson. For services to sport.
- Inez Edna Lee. For services to nursing.
- Elise Chatrine Lund. For services to the community.
- Patrick Joseph McArdle. For services to the community in Molong.
- John Charles Maclachlan, lately Officer-in-Charge, Middle Harbour Public Magazines, Explosives Department, Department of Mines.
- Charles Arthur Henry McNeill. For services to sport.
- John Marchant. For services to the community, especially in Scouting.
- James Joseph Mooney. For services to the community.
- Councillor Reginald James Murphy. For services to local government.
- Dorothy Alice Nicholls. For services to the community.
- Margaret Oppen. For services to the arts.
- Clara Isabel Oxley. For services to the community in Condobolin.
- Gladys Dorothy Palmer. For services to the community.
- Alexander Mason Campbell Purdie. For services to the Central District Ambulance Service.
- Harold James Reid. For services to the community.
- George Michael Ryan, MM. For services to ex-servicemen.
- William Thomas Shaw, Personal Assistant to the Premier of New South Wales.
- Alderman Raymond Ernest Shurmer. For services to the community, especially to youth.
- Mary Shape. For services to the community in Cessnock.
- George Tayor. For services to horticulture.
- Lillian Gertrude Webb. For services to the community, particularly the Red Cross.

====== State of Victoria ======
- Dora Mary Armstrong, Stenographer Grade II, Public Works Department.
- Louisa Moutray Arnoldt. For services to the community in Kerang.
- Geoffrey Austin, of Portland. For services to country fire fighting.
- Ronald Elliot Barton, of Bendigo. For services to the community.
- Robert Home Bennie, House Manager, Government House, Melbourne.
- Bertha Lilian Brewer, of Box Hill North. For services to the community.
- Stanley Laurence Butler, of West Preston, lately Works Progress Officer, Government Printing Office.
- Elizabeth Carter, of East Reservoir, Cleaner, Public Works Department.
- Walter Alfred Crompton, of Ballarat. For services to country fire fighting.
- Ian Douglas Gulliver. For outstanding devotion to duty as a voluntary member of the Queenscliff Lifeboat Service.
- Norman Edward Duell, ED, of Chadstone. For services to ex-servicemen.
- Ivor Herbert Evans, lately Office Keeper, Victoria House, London.
- Albert Norman Field, of Homerton. For services to country fire fighting.
- Lewis Thomas Ford. For services to the community in Ararat.
- Donald Lewis Garnham. For outstanding devotion to duty as a voluntary member of the Queenscliff Lifeboat Service.
- William George Harrison, of Geelong West. For services to country fire fighting.
- Alan Murray Holloway, of Nyah West. For services to the community.
- Ewen Clarke Kirton, of Ballarat. For services to country cricket.
- Raymond George Knight, of Box Hill. For services to servicemen, ex-servicemen and their dependants.
- Patrick Loftus, of Croydon. For services to the community.
- William Arthur Matthews, of Clayton. For services to ex-servicemen and women.
- Jean Gertrude Mole, of Brighton Beach. For services to pre-school children.
- Mary Isabel Mossenton, of Carrum. For services to the community.
- Dorothy Minnie Myers, Supervising Telephonist, Technical & General Division, Public Works Department.
- Jean Sarah Nickell, of East Kew. Typist, State Tender Board.
- Thomas Francis Perrow, of Bendigo. For services to the YMCA. and the community.
- Walter Gordon Titheridge, of Wendouree. For services to country fire fighting.
- Frank Wilson, of Newborough. For services to the community.
- William Wright, of West Preston. For services to junior football.

=== Royal Red Cross (RRC) ===
- Lieutenant-Colonel Francis Joyce Minnis (470679), Queen Alexandra's Royal Army Nursing Corps, Territorial & Army Volunteer Reserve.
- Colonel Margaret Moynahan (371193), Queen Alexandra's Royal Army Nursing Corps.

==== Associate of the Royal Red Cross (ARRC) ====
===== Royal Navy =====
- Sheilah Helen Way, Superintending Sister, Queen Alexandra's Royal Naval Nursing Service.

===== Army =====
- Major Helen McLean Hiley (213523), Queen Alexandra's Royal Army Nursing Corps, Territorial & Army Volunteer Reserve, now retired.
- Captain Ann Rosemary Bryant James (48S334), Queen Alexandra's Royal Army Nursing Corps.
- Major Catherine Morrison (441515), Queen Alexandra's Royal Army Nursing Corps.
- Major Gwenneth Anne Staines (446055), Queen Alexandra's Royal Army Nursing Corps.

===== Royal Air Force =====
- Squadron Officer Maureen Theresa Bird (407105), Princess Mary's Royal Air Force Nursing Service.

=== Air Force Cross (AFC) ===
==== Royal Air Force ====
- Wing Commander Leonard Arthur Bryan Baker (2556390).
- Wing Commander Raymond Leigh Watson (3509837).
- Squadron Leader Roger Mark Austin (4230216).
- Squadron Leader Peter Robert Bond (4097547).
- Squadron Leader Charles Kirkham, DFM, (633346).
- Flight Lieutenant Kenneth Stuart Ogilvie Allan (24742860).
- Flight Lieutenant Winston Leonard Martin Mayer (4232134).
- Flight Lieutenant Ronald George Rhodes (3504347).
- Flight Lieutenant Ronald Grierson Scott (3136429).

=== Bar to Air Force Cross ===
==== Royal Air Force ====
- Squadron Leader John Bankier Robinson, AFC, (4098311).

=== Air Force Medal (AFM) ===
==== Royal Air Force ====
- X4167956 Flight Sergeant (now Master Air Signaller) James Frood Clark.

=== Queen's Police Medal (QPM) ===
==== England & Wales ====
- Jack Bennett, BEM, Deputy Chief Constable, York & North East Yorkshire Police.
- Andrew McKay McIntosh, lately Assistant Chief Constable, Cheshire Constabulary.
- Harold Williams, Assistant Chief Constable, West Midlands Constabulary.
- Roy Harrison, Assistant Chief Constable, West Yorkshire Constabulary.
- Archibald Atherton, Assistant Chief Constable, Lancashire Constabulary.
- Ernest Peter Bellamy, Assistant Chief Constable, Birmingham City Police.
- John Ward Bodycombe, Commander, Metropolitan Police.
- Willis Vickers, Chief Superintendent, Essex & Southend-on-Sea Joint Constabulary.
- Kenneth Clayton, Chief Superintendent, Manchester & Salford Police.
- Jack Nicholson, DSM, Chief Superintendent, Kingston upon Hull City Police.
- Cornelius Mulvihill, Chief Superintendent, Metropolitan Police.
- Robert Wood McGowan, Chief Superintendent, Metropolitan Police.
- Hilda Mary Hazlehurst, lately Superintendent, West Mercia Constabulary.

==== Scotland ====
- Thomas Wood Chasser, Chief Constable, Scottish North Eastern Counties Constabulary.
- Hugh Alexander Macleod, Chief Superintendent and Deputy Chief Constable, Ross & Sutherland Constabulary.

==== Northern Ireland ====
- Henry Cowsley Hutchinson, Sergeant, Royal Ulster Constabulary.

==== British Railways Board ====
- Albert Stanley Pooley, Deputy Chief Constable, British Transport Police.

==== Overseas Territories ====
- Maurice Gotfried, MBE, CPM, Assistant Commissioner, Royal Hong Kong Auxiliary Police Force.
- Michael Clafton Illingworth, CPM, Assistant Commissioner, Royal Hong Kong Police Force.

==== Australian States ====
===== State of New South Wales =====
- Robert William Beath, Superintendent, 3rd Class.
- Leslie Marshall Beuzeville, Superintendent, 2nd Class.
- Clive George Bush, Superintendent, 3rd Class.
- Ernest Matthew Crawford, Superintendent, 3rd Class.
- Russell Nelson Crook, Inspector, 1st Class.
- Alan Winston Douglas, Superintendent, 2nd Class.
- George Edward Godfrey, Superintendent, 2nd Class.
- William George Hale, Superintendent, 3rd Class.
- Donald Grant Searle, Superintendent, 3rd Class.
- Reginald Thomas Stackpool, Assistant Commissioner.

===== State of Queensland =====
- Donald Buchanan, Superintendent.
- Cedric Norman Germain, Superintendent.
- Cecil Ernest Smith, Superintendent.

===== State of Western Australia =====
- Reginald James Court, Assistant Commissioner.
- Athol Trevor Monck, lately Superintendent (Acting Chief Superintendent).

=== Queen's Fire Services Medal (QFSM) ===
==== England & Wales ====
- Harold Garlick, Chief Officer, Oldham Fire Brigade.
- Dudley Raeburn Marsden, BEM, lately Acting Chief Officer (Assistant Chief Officer), Devon & Torbay Fire Brigade.
- Samuel George Mealor, Divisional Officer, Grade II, (Deputy Chief Officer), Birkenhead Fire Brigade.

==== Northern Ireland ====
- Robert Mitchell, formerly Chief Officer, Belfast Fire Brigade, now Senior Course Director, Fire Service Staff College.

=== Colonial Police Medal (CPM) ===
==== Overseas Territories ====
- Ellis Theophilus Black, Sergeant, Royal St. Lucia Police Force.
- Cheung Wood-hoi, Ambulanceman, Hong Kong Fire Services.
- Chi Min-chi, Police Station Sergeant, Royal Hong Kong Police Force.
- James Walker Currie, Chief Inspector of Police, Royal Hong Kong Police Force.
- Haynes Cyril, Inspector, Royal St Lucia Police Force.
- Johannes Fevrier, Inspector, Royal St. Lucia Police Force.
- James Flood, Inspector, Royal St. Lucia Police Force.
- Lionel Lenston Franklyn, Acting Station Sergeant, Royal St. Lucia Police Force.
- Ho Fuk-cheung, Chief Inspector of Police, Royal Hong Kong Police Force.
- Lam Man-sai, Senior Fireman, Hong Kong Fire Services.
- Leung Tak-yan, Assistant Divisional Officer, Hong Kong Fire Services.
- Alfred Lumb, Divisional Officer, Hong Kong Fire Services.
- Mark Sum, Principal Fireman, Hong Kong Fire Services.
- John William MCarthy, Divisional Officer, Hong Kong Fire Services.
- Laurence Power, Superintendent of Police, Royal Hong Kong Police Force.
- William John Roberts, Superintendent of Police, Royal Hong Kong Police Force.
- Harry Ronan, Chief Inspector of Police, Royal Hong Kong Police Force.
- Nathaniel Samuel, Station Sergeant, Royal St. Lucia Police Force.
- Siu Him, Senior Fireman, Hong Kong Fire Services.
- Bernard Samuel Ward, Assistant Superintendent, British Solomon Islands Police Force.
- Wei Chun-ki, Superintendent of Police, Royal Hong Kong Auxiliary Police Force.
- Woo Wing, Inspector of Police, Royal Hong Kong Police Force.
- Wilson Young, Wai-huen, Inspector of Police, Royal Hong Kong Auxiliary Police Force.

=== Queen's Commendation for Valuable Service in the Air ===
==== Royal Air Force ====
- Wing Commander Ian Howard Panton (3110062).
- Squadron Leader Anthony Victor Barrett (506407).
- Squadron Leader David John Curry (608067), for services with the Kenya Air Force.
- Squadron Leader John Trevor Egginton, AFC, (4083602).
- Squadron Leader Basil John Gowling (4088318).
- Squadron Leader Francis Raymond James (193231).
- Squadron Leader Denis Joseph Lowery, AFC, (3040523).
- Squadron Leader Clive Mitchell (608357).
- Squadron Leader Robert Geoffrey Peters (608077).
- Squadron Leader Jeremy Simon Blake Price (607935).
- Squadron Leader Robert George Valentine (2573501), (Retired).
- Squadron Leader Ronald Andrew Fellowes Wilson (608139).
- Flight Lieutenant John David Blake (4230045).
- Flight Lieutenant Rodney Christopher Dean (4231607).
- Flight Lieutenant John Trevor Galyer (4231165).
- Flight Lieutenant Brian Richard Hosktns (4232225).
- Flight Lieutenant Peter Michael Jewell (586577).
- Flight Lieutenant Eric Thomson Inglis King (4232049).
- Flight Lieutenant Graeme Alan Robertson (608513).
- Flight Lieutenant Peter Ted Squire (608512).
- Master Pilot John Marshall McQuie Walker (A1583420).

==== United Kingdom ====
- Leonard Rex Rayment Gottrell, Fleet Manager, British Caledonian Airways Ltd.
- William Mitchell Reid, Senior Captain (First Class), British Overseas Airways Corporation.
- Phillip James Robson, Senior Flight Engineering Superintendent, British Overseas Airways Corporation.
- Ian Savage, Senior Training Captain, British European Airways.
- David Smith, Senior Captain (First Class), British Overseas Airways Corporation.

== Mauritius ==
=== Knight Bachelor ===
- Andre Guy Sauzier, CBE, ED. For public service.

=== Order of the British Empire ===
==== Commander of the Order of the British Empire (CBE) ====
===== Civil Division =====
- Valaydon Packeeree Poonoosamy, lately Principal Medical Officer, Ministry of Health.

==== Officer of the Order of the British Empire (OBE) ====
===== Civil Division =====
- Jules Henri Constantin. For services to the legal profession and for voluntary social work.
- Marie Elysee Maurice Doger de Speville. For services to local government.
- Mohunparsad Shurmah Jugdambi, MLA. For services to politics and the trade union movement.

==== Member of the Order of the British Empire (MBE) ====
===== Civil Division =====
- Aniroodh Dwarka. For voluntary social work and for services to local government.
- Dawood Khoyratty, lately Principal Assistant Secretary, General Services.
- Julia Constance Maigrot. For services in the field of paediatrics and for voluntary social work.
- Grace Margaret Mootoosasmy. For voluntary social work.
- Ramjuttun Neewooth. For voluntary social work.

=== British Empire Medal (BEM) ===
==== Civil Division ====
- Vishnu Appadoo, Sergeant, Mauritius Police Force.

=== Queen's Police Medal (QPM) ===
- Makanlall Dindoyal, CPM, lately Assistant Commissioner, Mauritius Police Force.
- Jugmohunsing Fulena, CPM, Deputy Commissioner, Mauritius Police Force.

== Fiji ==
=== Order of the British Empire ===
==== Officer of the Order of the British Empire (OBE) ====
===== Civil Division =====
- Raymond Wilmot Baker, Permanent Secretary for Urban Development, Housing and Social Welfare.
- Yanktesh Permal Reddy. For his contribution to Fiji's development and services to the community.

==== Member of the Order of the British Empire (MBE) ====
===== Civil Division =====
- Ratu Ilaijia Roratu Baleinaivalu. For public services and community leadership.
- Edward Fedrick Kaad. For services to the community.
