= Alexander Anton =

Scottish scholar (1922–2011)

Alexander Anton CBE, FBA
- Born: 2 July 1922
- Died: 11 June 2011 (aged 88)

Academic background
- Education: University of Aberdeen

Academic work
- Discipline: Law
- Institutions: University of Aberdeen

Alexander Elder Anton, CBE, FBA (2 July 1922 – 11 June 2011), often known as Sandy Anton, was a Scottish legal scholar.

== Biography ==
Anton was born on 2 July 1922. He served in the Gordon Highlanders from 1941 to 1945 and then attended the University of Aberdeen, where he graduated with a Master of Arts degree in 1946 and a Bachelor of Laws degree in 1949. He then practised as a solicitor in Aberdeen for four years before working as a lecturer at the University of Aberdeen from 1953 to 1959. Anton was Professor of Jurisprudence at the University of Glasgow between 1959 and 1973.

Anton was elected a Fellow of the British Academy in 1972 and appointed a Commander of the Order of the British Empire in the 1973 Birthday Honours. He was also awarded with an honorary doctorate from the University of Aberdeen in 1993. He died on 6 June 2011.
