= George Holliday (bobsleigh) =

British bobsledder

George Stanley Charles Holliday, CBE (14 February 1917 – 14 May 1990) was a British bobsledder who competed in the late 1940s. He finished seventh in the four-man event at the 1948 Winter Olympics in St. Moritz.

He was appointed CBE in the 1973 Birthday Honours for services to British commercial interests in Africa.
