= Richard Buckley (courtier) =

Royal Navy officer (1928–2022)

Lieutenant-Commander Sir Peter Richard Buckley, KCVO, FRGS (31 January 1928 – 31 January 2022) was a British Royal Navy officer and courtier. He entered the Royal Navy as a cadet in 1945 and served until retiring in 1961 with the rank of lieutenant-commander. That year, he joined the household of Prince Edward, Duke of Kent, and Katharine, Duchess of Kent, as their Private Secretary, serving until retirement in 1989.

Buckley was appointed a Member (Fourth Class) of the Royal Victorian Order in 1968, and promoted to Commander in 1973 and Knight Commander in 1982. He was elected a Fellow of the Royal Geographical Society in 1999. A freemason, he was initiated in 1963, and served as Master of the Lodge of Assistance, United Grand Lodge of England, in 1967. He died on his 94th birthday, on 31 January 2022.
