= Ivor Vidler =

Australian public servant

Ivor Percy Kidd Vidler CBE (9 May 1909 – August 1976) was an Australian public servant who served as Clerk of the New South Wales Legislative Assembly.

== Early life ==
Vidler was born in New South Wales and was educated at Newington College in Sydney from 1925 until 1928.

== Public service ==
Vidler joined the NSW Parliament in 1928 and served in a number of positions, including Serjeant-at-Arms, before serving as Clerk of the NSW Legislative Assembly from 1967 until 1974.

== Honours ==
Vidler was made a Commander of the Order of the British Empire in 1973 in recognition of his services to the New South Wales Parliament.
