= Disablement Advisory Committee =

United Kingdom government organization

Disablement Advisory Committees were established in the United Kingdom by the Disabled Persons (Employment) Act 1944. This was the first attempt to address the question of the employment of disabled people as a whole.

One was established for each major local employment exchange, with equal numbers of workers and employers, some independent members and an independent chairman. They had some control over the Disabled Persons Register and the operation of the quota system. They were the responsibility of the Ministry of Labour.

A National Advisory Council on the Employment of the Disabled was also established.
