= Joan Mary Woodhill =

Australian dietitian

Joan Woodhill OBE
- Born: Joan Mary Woodhill; 5 May 1912; Camden, New South Wales, Australia
- Died: 12 December 1990 (aged 78); St Leonards, New South Wales, Australia
- Education: Ravenswood School for Girls, University of Sydney, Ravenswood School for Girls, Harvard University
- Known for: first student of dietetics at the Royal Prince Alfred Hospital

Joan Mary Woodhill OBE (5 May 1912 – 12 December 1990) was an early Australian dietitian. She originally graduated in Agricultural science, but finding no jobs she was the first student of dietetics at the Royal Prince Alfred Hospital.

== Life ==
Woodhill was born in 1912 at Camden, New South Wales. Her Australian-born parents were Maria Louise (born Pepper) and Frank Leslie Woodhill. Her father was in charge of a store but he died when she was about six and the family re-located to the Sydney suburb of Gordon where she attended Ravenswood School for Girls. Her first career choice was underpinned by a degree in agricultural science from the University of Sydney but despite this she could not find relevant employment. Woodhill's mother had heard Edith Tilton speak about diet and she suggested that this might suit her daughter.

In 1937 Royal Prince Alfred Hospital began its first course in dietetics and Woodhill was the inaugural student and internee. In the following year she was the first assistant-dietitian and in 1939 she helped found the New South Wales Dietetic Association when she became its first secretary.

She was awarded an OBE in 1973 and ten years later the Dietitians Association of Australia made her a life member.

== Death and legacy ==
Woodhill died in 1990 in St Leonards.

An annual lecture was established in her name at the National Dietitians Association of Australia Conference. The 24th was in 2006.
