= List of Legislative Council of Hong Kong unofficial members 1946–1985 =

This is a list of unofficial members of the Legislative Council in the colonial period from restoration of the Council after the return of the British rule in 1946 up to the official members were replaced by indirect elected member in 1985. There were a maximum of 23 Unofficial Members from 1976 to 1983, 29 Unofficial Members from 1983 to 1984 and 32 Unofficial Members from 1984 to 1985.

== Change in composition ==
Year	Number of Official Members exclusive of the Governor	Number of Unofficial Members
1946	9	7
1947	8	7
1951	9	8
1964	12	13
1972	14	15
1976	23	23
1980	26	27
1983	29	29
1984	29	32

== List of Unofficial Members of the Legislative Council ==
Members	Assumed office	Left office	Background	Remarks
Leo d'Almada e Castro	1 May 1946	29 April 1953	Barrister	Portuguese representative
Chau Sik-nin	1 May 1946	5 September 1959	Doctor	Senior Chinese Unofficial Member & Senior Unofficial Member (1953–59)
Chau Tsun-nin	1 May 1946	29 April 1953	Barrister	Senior Chinese Unofficial Member (1946–53); Senior Unofficial Member (1950–53)
Ronald Dare Gillespie	1 May 1946	14 April 1948	Imperial Chemical Industries (China) Ltd	Representative of the Hong Kong General Chamber of Commerce (1946–48); Resigned on 28 April 1948
David Fortune Landale	1 May 1946	4 January 1950	Jardine Matheson & Co.	Senior Unofficial Member (1946–50); resigned on 5 January 1950
Lo Man-kam	1 May 1946	5 June 1950	Barrister	Resigned on 5 June 1950
Maurice Murray Watson	24 October 1946	18 March 1953		Resigned on 19 March 1953
Charles Collingwood Roberts	31 October 1946	28 July 1948	Butterfield & Swire	Representative of the Hong Kong General Chamber of Commerce (1948); Resigned on 30 July 1948
Thomas Megarry	30 January 1947	2 October 1947		Sitting as unofficial
Thomas Megarry	23 October 1947	23 October 1947		Sitting as unofficial
Norman Oswald Cyril Marsh	12 May 1948	10 November 1948	Businessman	
Philip Stanley Cassidy	25 August 1948	30 April 1952	John D Hutchison & Co.	Representative of the Hong Kong General Chamber of Commerce (1948–53)
Cedric Blaker	27 April 1949	6 March 1958	Gilman & Co.	Representative of the Hong Kong General Chamber of Commerce (1953–58)
Charles Edward Michael Terry	8 February 1950	5 September 1959	Businessman	
Lawrence Kadoorie	14 June 1950	19 September 1951	Kadoorie Group	
Lawrence Kadoorie	7 April 1954	17 November 1954	Kadoorie Group	
Lo Man-wai	14 June 1950	5 September 1959	Barrister	
Ngan Shing-kwan	11 July 1951	21 June 1961	Businessman	Senior Chinese Unofficial Member & Senior Unofficial Member (1959–61); retired on 21 June 1961
Hubert John Collar	14 May 1952	26 March 1953	Imperial Chemical Industries (China) Ltd	Representative of the Hong Kong General Chamber of Commerce (1953); Resigned on 10 April 1953
Kwok Chan	14 May 1952	27 June 1962		Senior Chinese Unofficial Member & Senior Unofficial Member (1961–62)
Dhun Jehangir Ruttonjee	26 March 1953	26 June 1968	Businessman	Senior Unofficial Member (1962–68); Retired on 26 June 1968
Alberto Maria Rodrigues	20 May 1953	5 September 1959	Doctor	Portuguese representative
John Arthur Blackwood	16 June 1954	28 September 1955	Butterfield & Swire	
Richard Charles Lee	30 March 1955	20 July 1955	Businessman	
Richard Charles Lee	8 July 1959	12 May 1965	Businessman	Resigned on 13 June 1965
John Douglas Clague	20 June 1956	23 March 1960	John D Hutchison & Co	Representative of the Hong Kong General Chamber of Commerce (1953–60)
Hugh David MacEwen Barton	3 December 1958	23 May 1962	Jardine, Matheson & Co.	
Kenneth Fung Ping-fan	8 July 1959	23 June 1965	Businessman	Senior Chinese Unofficial Member (1962–66); resigned on 23 June 1965
Kwan Cho-yiu	8 July 1959	8 June 1966		Senior Chinese Unofficial Member (1965–66); replaced Lo Man-wai
George MacDonald Goldsack	6 April 1960	21 June 1961	Dodwell & Co.	Representative of the Hong Kong General Chamber of Commerce (1960–61); Retired on 21 June 1961
Donald Black	10 August 1960	23 November 1960	Businessman	
Kan Yuet-keung	7 June 1961	21 June 1972	Barrister	Senior Chinese Unofficial Member (1966–72); Senior Unofficial Member (1968–72)
Li Fook-shu	7 June 1961	26 June 1968	Businessman	
William Charles Goddard Knowles	19 July 1961	17 June 1964	Butterfield & Swire	Representative of the Hong Kong General Chamber of Commerce (1961–64)
Sidney Samuel Gordon	13 June 1962	8 June 1966	Kadoorie Group	Retired on 8 June 1966
Fung Hon-chu	8 August 1962	8 July 1970		Resigned on 8 July 1970
James Dickson Leach	23 October 1963	1 May 1968		Retired on 1 May 1968
Wilfred Wong Sien-bing	23 October 1963	6 November 1963	Businessman	
Wilfred Wong Sien-bing	30 June 1965	19 June 1974	Businessman	
George Ronald Ross	8 July 1964	11 September 1968	Deacon & Co.	Representative of the Hong Kong General Chamber of Commerce (1964–68)
Tang Ping-yuan	8 July 1964	26 June 1968	Businessman	
Tse Yu-chuen	8 July 1964	17 June 1970	Businessman	Resigned on 17 June 1970
Kenneth Albert Watson	8 July 1964	17 June 1970	Businessman	Resigned on 17 June 1970
Woo Pak-chuen	8 July 1964	19 June 1974	Barrister	Senior Chinese Unofficial Member (1972–74); Senior Unofficial Member (1974)
Szeto Wai	19 August 1964	19 June 1974	Engineer	
Ellen Li Shu-pui	23 June 1965	20 June 1973		
Chung Sze-yuen	28 July 1965	16 August 1978		Senior Unofficial Member & Senior Chinese Unofficial Member (1974–78)
Michael Alexander Robert Herries	29 March 1967	20 May 1970	Jardine, Matheson & Co.	Representative of the Hong Kong General Chamber of Commerce (1968–69)
Daniel Lam See-hin	26 April 1967	20 December 1967	Businessman	
Wilson Wang Tze-sam	20 December 1967	18 June 1975	Educator	
Herbert John Charles Browne	22 May 1968	25 April 1973	John Swire & Sons	Retired on 30 April 1973
Ann Tse-kai	5 June 1968	19 June 1974	Winsor Industrial Corp	
Lee Quo-wei	10 July 1968	16 August 1978	Hang Seng Bank	
Oswald Victor Cheung	6 November 1968	30 July 1981	Barrister	Senior Unofficial Member & Senior Chinese Unofficial Member (1978–81)
Gerald Mordaunt Broome Salmon	1 October 1969	21 June 1972	Mackinnon, Mackenzie & Co	Representative of the Hong Kong General Chamber of Commerce (1970–72)
Lo Kwee-seong	8 July 1970	21 June 1972	Businessman	
Li Fook-wo	7 July 1971	30 July 1981	Businessman	
John Louis Marden	4 August 1971	18 August 1971	Businessman	
Rogerio Hyndman Lobo	5 July 1972	7 August 1985	Businessman & Urban Councillor	Senior Unofficial Member (1981–85)
Joyce Symons	5 July 1972	4 August 1976	Educator	
Peter Gordon Williams	5 July 1972	16 August 1978	Dodwell & Co, Ltd	Representative of the Hong Kong General Chamber of Commerce (1975–78)
James Wu Man-hon	5 July 1972	1 August 1979	Businessman	
Mary Wong Wing-cheung	15 November 1972	15 March 1973		Died in office
Kenneth Lo Tak-cheung	25 April 1973	22 May 1974	Barrister	
Hilton Cheong-Leen	9 May 1973	1 August 1979	Urban Councillor	
Guy Mowbray Sayer	20 June 1973	19 June 1974	Hongkong and Shanghai Banking Corporation	
Lo Tak-shing	1 July 1974	12 February 1985	Solicitor	Resigned on 12 February 1985
John Henry Bremridge	3 July 1974	19 November 1980	Butterfield & Swire	Appointed as the first Financial Secretary with non-civil servant background in 1981
Harry Fang Sin-yang	3 July 1974	12 September 1985	Surgeon	Senior Chinese Unofficial Member (1981–85)
Kwan Ko Siu-wah	3 July 1974	16 August 1978		
Francis Yuan-hao Tien	3 July 1974	7 August 1985	Manhattan Garments Ltd.	
Alex Wu Shu-chih	22 January 1975	7 August 1985	Fidelity Management Ltd.	
Lydia Dunn	1 September 1976	31 August 1985	John Swire & Sons	Senior Chinese Unofficial Member & Senior Unofficial Member (1985–88)
Joyce Mary Bennett	6 October 1976	10 August 1983	Clergy & School Principal	
Chen Shou-lum	6 October 1976	7 August 1985		
Henry Hu Hung-lick	6 October 1976	10 August 1983	Barrister	
Leung Tat-shing	6 October 1976	6 August 1980	Trade Unionist	
Patrick Terence McGovern	6 October 1976	8 August 1984	Clergy	Died in office
Peter Wong Chak-cheong	6 October 1976	7 August 1985	Solicitor	
Wong Lam	6 October 1976	7 August 1985		
Rayson Lisung Huang	5 October 1977	10 August 1983	Scholar	
Charles Yeung Siu-cho	5 October 1977	4 October 1984	Solicitor	
Allen Lee Peng-fei	1 September 1978	31 August 1985	Jada Electronics Ltd.	Senior Chinese Unofficial Member & Senior Unofficial Member (1988–92)
Ho Kam-fai	11 October 1978	7 August 1985	Scholar	
David Kennedy Newbigging	11 October 1978	28 July 1982	Jardine, Matheson & Co.	Representative of the Hong Kong General Chamber of Commerce (1978–85)
Andrew So Kwok-wing	11 October 1978	7 August 1985	Insurance agent	
Hu Fa-kuang	10 October 1979	7 August 1985	Ryoden Electric Engineering Co., Ltd.	
Wong Po-yan	10 October 1979	7 August 1985	United Oversea Enterprises, Ltd.	
John Joseph Swaine	1 September 1980	31 August 1985	Barrister	
William Charles Langdon Brown	1 October 1980	7 August 1985	Standard Chartered Bank	
Chan Kam-chuen	1 October 1980	7 August 1985		
Stephen Cheong Kam-chuen	2 December 1980	30 August 1985	Lee Wah Weaving Factory Ltd. & Cheong's Textile Co. Ltd.	
Selina Chow Liang Shuk-yee	1 September 1981	31 August 1985		
Maria Tam Wai-chu	1 September 1981	31 August 1985	Barrister & Urban Councillor	
Benton Cheung Yan-lung	7 October 1981	7 August 1985		
Henrietta Ip Man-hing	6 October 1982	7 August 1985	Paediatrician	
Rita Fan Hsu Lai-tai	1 September 1983	31 August 1985		
Chan Ying-lun	27 September 1983	7 August 1985		
Pauline Ng Chow May-lin	27 September 1983	7 August 1985	Teacher	
Peter Poon Wing-cheung	27 September 1983	7 August 1985	Accountant	
Yeung Po-kwan	27 September 1983	7 August 1985	School principal	
Keith Lam Hon-keung	26 September 1984	7 August 1985		
Carl Tong Ka-wing	26 September 1984	7 August 1985	Accountant	
Kim Cham Yau-sum	4 October 1984	7 August 1985	Accountant	

== See also ==
- List of Legislative Council of Hong Kong members 1843–1941
- List of Executive Council of Hong Kong unofficial members 1946–1997
