= Commercial (First) functional constituency =

Functional constituency in Hong Kong

Commercial (First) 商界（第一）
- Functional constituency for the Legislative Council of Hong Kong
- Region: Hong Kong
- Electorate: 903

Current constituency
- Created: 1985
- Number of members: One
- Member: Jonathan Lamport (BPA)

The Commercial (First) functional constituency (Chinese: 商界（第一）功能界別) is a functional constituency in the elections for the Legislative Council of Hong Kong first created in 1985. The constituency is composed of corporate members of the Hong Kong General Chamber of Commerce (HKGCC) that are entitled to vote at general meetings of the Chamber.

It is one of the oldest functional constituencies created for the first elections to the Legislative Council in 1985. Prior to that, the Chamber had its representatives in the council thoroughly through elections at the general meetings since 1884. It corresponds to the Commercial (First) Subsector in the Election Committee.

== History ==
The Commercial (First) functional constituency was established as First Commercial, one of the two commercial electoral divisions elected by the chambers of commerce. It was one of the original 12 functional constituency seats created for the 1985 Legislative Council election, the first ever election for the colonial legislature. It was composed of bodies that are members of the Hong Kong General Chamber of Commerce (HKGCC) entitled to vote at general meetings of the chamber. Prior to that, the Chamber had its representatives in the council thoroughly through elections at the general meetings since 1884. The representatives are listed as following:

Since its creation, it has been held by pro-business conservatives for the exception of former government official Jimmy McGregor, a liberal-leaning representative who defeated Veronica Wu of the conservative bloc Group of 88 in the 1988 Legislative Council election and held the office from 1988 to 1995. He co-founded the pro-democracy professional-oriented Hong Kong Democratic Foundation (HKDF) and was an ally of the last governor Chris Patten over the controversial constitutional reform proposal.

From 1998 to 2004, the seat was held by pro-business Liberal Party chairman and Executive Councillor James Tien until he contested in the direct election in the 2004 Legislative Council election. Tien's successor Jeffrey Lam who has held the seat since 2004 abruptly quit the Liberal Party in 2008 in the intra-party split. He became representative for the Business and Professionals Alliance for Hong Kong (BPA) and has become member of the Executive Council.

== Return members ==
=== Before 1985 ===
Chamber Legislative Council Representatives (before 1985)
	Member	Company	Acting representative
1884–87	Thomas Jackson	HSBC	Alexander MacConachie (1884; Gilman); A. P. MacEwen (1886; Holiday Wise)
1887–90	A. P. MacEwen	Holiday Wise	Bendyshe Layton (1888; Gibb Livingston)
1890–1902	T. H. Whitehead	Chartered Bank	Herbert Smith (1900; Swire); John Thurburn (1900; Mercantile Bank); Robert Shewan (1902; Shewan Tomes)
1902–06	Robert Shewan	Shewan Tomes	Henry Pollock (1903; Barrister)
1906–15	E. A. Hewett	P&O	Murray Stewart (1908 & 1912; Stewart Bros); J. W. C. Bonnar (1912; Gibb Livingston)
1915–26	P. H. Holyoak	Reiss → Holoyak Massey	S. H. Dodwell (1917; Deacon); E. V. D. Parr (1919; Jardine; Mackinnon Mackenzie); A. O. Lang (1921; Gibb Livingstone)
1926–27			D. G. M. Bernard (1926; Jardine)
1927–31	J. O. Hughes	Harry Wicking	B. D. F. Beith (1929; Jardine)
1931–35	C. Gordon Mackie	Mackinnon Mackenzie	W. H. Bell (1932; APC)
1935–36	W. H. Bell	APC	
1936–37	A. W. Hughes	Union	
1937–38	M. T. Johnson	Shewan Tomes	
1938–44	A. L. Shields	Shewan Tomes	J. K. Bousfield (1939; APC)
1946–48	R. D. Gillespie	ICI (China)	
1948	C. C. Roberts	Swire	
1948–53	P. S. Cassidy	Hutchison	Cedric Blaker (1949; Gilman)
1953	H. J. Collar	ICI (China)	
1953–58	Cedric Blaker	Gilman	J. A. Blackwood (1954 & 1955; Swire); Douglas Clague (1956; Hutchison)
1958–60	Douglas Clague	Hutchison	
1960–61	G. M. Goldsack	Dodwell	
1961–64	W. C. G. Knowles	Swire	J. Dickson Leach (1963; Union)
1964–68	G. R. Ross	Deacon	J. Dickson Leach (1965; Union); M. A. R. Herries (1967; Jardine)
1968	M. A. R. Herries	Jardine	G. R. Ross (1968; Deacon)
1969	M. A. R. Herries	Jardine	G. R. Ross (1969; Deacon); G. M. B. Salmon (1969; Mackinnon Mackenz)
1970–72	G. M. B. Salmon	Mackinnon Mackenzie	G. R. Ross (Deacon); Douglas Clague (Hutchison); T. K. Ann (Winsor Industrial)
1972–74	P. G. Williams	Dodwell	G. R. Ross (Deacon); Douglas Clague (Hutchison); Sidney Gordon (Lowe, Bingham & Matthews); Ann Tse-kai (Winsor Industrial)
1975–76	P. G. Williams	Dodwell	G. R. Ross (Deacon); Douglas Clague (Hutchison); Sidney Gordon (Lowe, Bingham & Matthews); Ann Tse-kai (Winsor Industrial)
1977–78	Sidney Gordon	Lowe, Bingham & Matthews	J. H. Bremridge (Swire); P. G. Williams (Dodwell); Lydia Dunn (Swire)
1978–80	David Newbigging	Jardine	Sidney Gordon (Lowe, Bingham & Matthews); J. H. Bremridge (Swire); Michael Sandberg (HSBC); Allen Lee (Sonca)
1981–82			D. K. Newbigging (Jardine, Matheson); Michael Sandberg (HSBC); Allen Lee (Sonca)
1983–85	Michael Sandberg	HSBC	D. K. Newbigging (Jardine, Matheson); Allen Lee (Sonca); W. C. L. Brown (Chartered Bank); Lydia Dunn (Swire); Stephen Cheong (Lee Wah Weaving)

=== After 1985 ===
Election	Member	Party	Company
1985	Thomas Clydesdale	Independent	Lowe, Bingham & Matthews → PwC
1988	Jimmy McGregor	Independent	McGregor
1991	Jimmy McGregor	HKDF	McGregor
1995	Paul Cheng	Independent	Inchcape
Not represented in the PLC (1997–1998)
1998	James Tien	Liberal	Manhattan Holdings
2000	James Tien	Liberal	Manhattan Holdings
2004	Jeffrey Lam	Liberal	Forward Winsome Industries
2008	Jeffrey Lam	Liberal→Independent→Economic Synergy	Forward Winsome Industries
2012	Jeffrey Lam	Economic Synergy→BPA	Forward Winsome Industries
2016	Jeffrey Lam	BPA	Forward Winsome Industries
2021	Jeffrey Lam	BPA	Forward Winsome Industries
2025	Jonathan Lamport	BPA	A-Grade Energy Limited

== Electoral results ==
=== 2020s ===
2025 Legislative Council election: Commercial (First)
Party	Candidate	Votes	%	±%
BPA	Jonathan Stuart Lamport	404	58.81	−27.34
Independent	Felix Lee Kar-chung	283	41.19	
Majority		121	17.62	
Total valid votes		687	100.00	
Rejected ballots		4		
Turnout		691	76.52	+3.58
Registered electors		903		
BPA hold		Swing		

2021 Legislative Council election: Commercial (First)
Party	Candidate	Votes	%	±%
BPA	Jeffrey Lam Kin-fung	628	86.15	
Nonpartisan	Edmond Yew Yat-ming	101	13.85	
Majority		527	72.30	
Total valid votes		729	100.00	
Rejected ballots		15		
Turnout		744	72.94	
Registered electors		1,041		
BPA hold		Swing		

=== 2010s ===
2016 Legislative Council election: Commercial (First)
Party	Candidate	Votes	%	±%
BPA	Jeffrey Lam Kin-fung	455	53.97	
Liberal	Joseph Chan Ho-lim	388	46.03	
Majority		67	7.94	
Total valid votes		843	100.00	
Rejected ballots		18		
Turnout		861	82.39	
Registered electors		1,086		
BPA hold		Swing		

2012 Legislative Council election: Commercial (First)
Party	Candidate	Votes	%	±%
Economic Synergy	Jeffrey Lam Kin-fung	Unopposed		
Registered electors		927		
Economic Synergy hold		Swing		

=== 2000s ===
2008 Legislative Council election: Commercial (First)
Party	Candidate	Votes	%	±%
Liberal	Jeffrey Lam Kin-fung	465	70.24	
Independent	Markus Joytak Shaw	197	29.76	
Majority		268	40.48	
Total valid votes		662	100.00	
Rejected ballots		32		
Turnout		694	66.73	
Registered electors		1,040		
Liberal hold		Swing		

2004 Legislative Council election: Commercial (First)
Party	Candidate	Votes	%	±%
Liberal	Jeffrey Lam Kin-fung	Unopposed		
Registered electors		1,077		
Liberal hold		Swing		

2000 Legislative Council election: Commercial (First)
Party	Candidate	Votes	%	±%
Liberal	James Tien Pei-chun	Unopposed		
Registered electors		1,325		
Liberal hold		Swing		

=== 1990s ===
1998 Legislative Council election: Commercial (First)
Party	Candidate	Votes	%	±%
Liberal	James Tien Pei-chun	Unopposed		
Registered electors		1,353		
Liberal win (new seat)				

1995 Legislative Council election: Commercial (First)
Party	Candidate	Votes	%	±%
Independent	Paul Cheng Ming-fun	Unopposed		
Registered electors		1,273		
Independent gain from HKDF		Swing		

1991 Legislative Council election: First Commercial
Party	Candidate	Votes	%	±%
HKDF	James David McGregor	487	53.93	
BPF	Paul Cheng Ming-fun	416	46.07	
Majority		71	7.86	
Total valid votes		903	100.00	
Rejected ballots		8		
Turnout		911	56.62	
Registered electors		1,609		
HKDF hold		Swing		

=== 1980s ===
1988 Legislative Council election: First Commercial
Party	Candidate	Votes	%	±%
Nonpartisan	James David McGregor	478	66.95	
Nonpartisan	Veronica Wu Shao-ching	236	33.05	
Majority		242	33.90	
Total valid votes		714	100.00	
Nonpartisan hold		Swing		

1985 Legislative Council election: First Commercial
Party	Candidate	Votes	%	±%
Nonpartisan	Thomas Clydesdale	470	59.49	
Nonpartisan	A. C. William Blaauw	320	40.51	
Majority		150	18.98	
Total valid votes		790	100.00	
Nonpartisan win (new seat)				
