= Wilfred Wong Sien-bing =

Wilfred Wong CBE, JP
- 黃宣平

Unofficial Member of the Legislative Council of Hong Kong
- In office 1965–1974
- Preceded by: Kenneth Fung

Member of the Urban Council of Hong Kong
- In office 1 April 1960 – 31 March 1968
- Preceded by: Yu Tat-chi

Personal details
- Born: 19 December 1910 Shanghai, Qing Empire
- Died: 28 June 1981 (aged 70) British Hong Kong
- Spouse: Looming How
- Children: Wilfred Wong Yih-ming; Wong On-ki
- Education: University of Toronto
- Occupation: Businessman

Wilfred Wong Sien-bing, CBE, JP (Chinese: 黃宣平; 19 December 1910 – 28 June 1981) was a Shanghai-born Hong Kong businessman and public figure. He made his fortune as the executive director of the American Engineering Corporation and the General Motors (China) in Shanghai. He set up his business in air conditioning in Hong Kong in 1947 as the agent of the Carrier Corporation. He was appointed unofficial member of the Urban Council from 1960 to 1968 and the Legislative Council of Hong Kong from 1965 to 1974.

== Early life and education ==
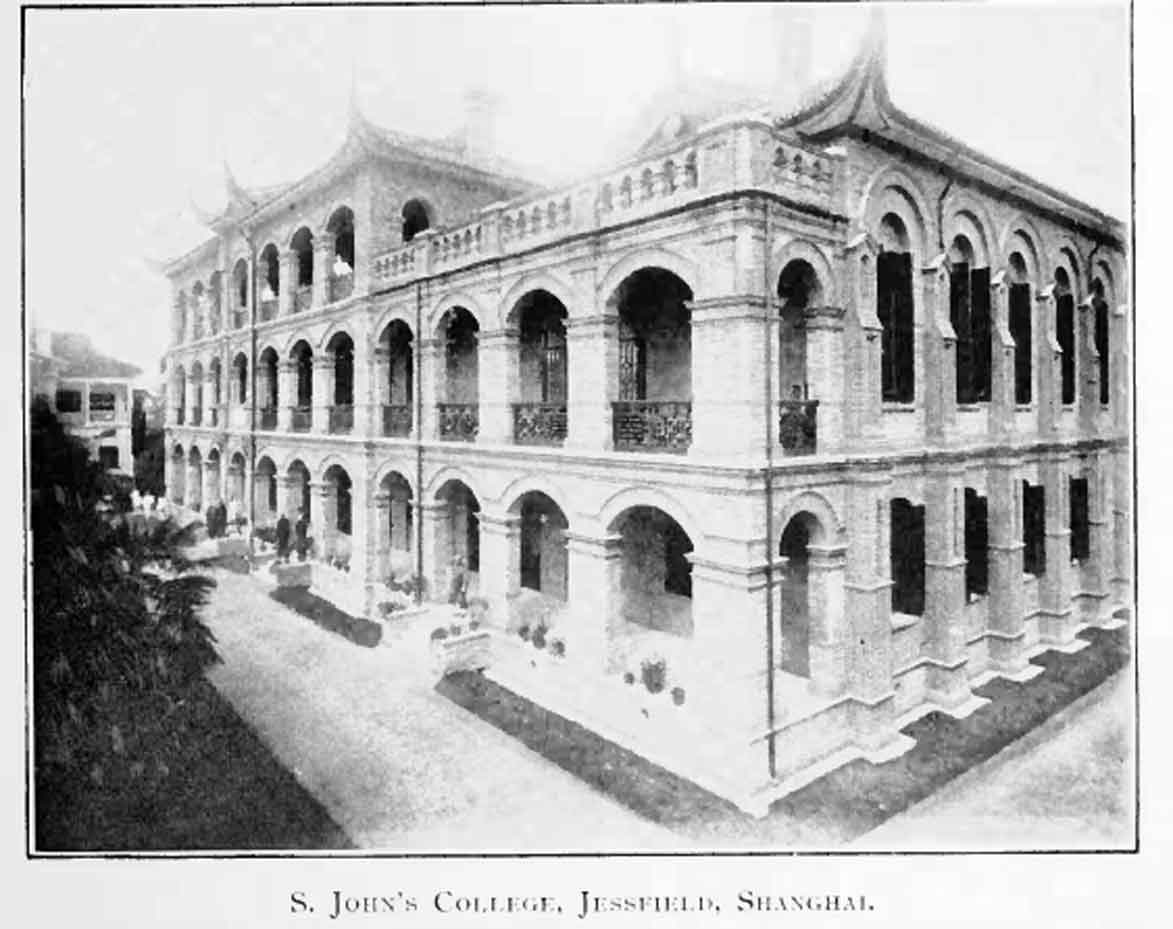
The St. John's University, Shanghai is closely associated with his family in which he later became a director of the university.

Wong was born on 19 December 1910 in Shanghai to a merchant family. His father, Wong Cho-ting (or Huang Zuoting), who died when he was eight years old, was the director of the overseas Chinese students in the United States. He was educated at the secondary school department of the St. John's University, Shanghai, a university closely associated with his family.

After he graduated in 1927, he was sent abroad to Canada and studied at the University of Toronto. He was a football player and athletic during his college years. He interned at the General Motors in Canada during his summer holidays where his cousin was working, who was also mentor of Edward Stettinius, Jr., the vice-president of the company.

After Wong graduated from the university in 1931 with a bachelor's degree, he joined the General Motors at its headquarters in Detroit, Michigan, working at the engineering research department. He was later transferred to the Frigidaire refrigerator factory of the General Motors in Dayton, Ohio. He was also member of the Chinese Institution of Engineers and the American Society of Heating and Ventilating Engineers.

== Shanghai life ==
=== Business and public career ===
Wong returned to the Shanghai and worked as engineer at the American Engineering Corporation, the agent of Frigidaire in Shanghai. He was promoted to the manager in 1934, vice-president in 1938 and executive director in 1940, when he was 30-year of age. He was the director of the company until the outbreak of the Pacific War in 1941. He was also executive director of the General Motors (China) Limited from late 1936 until the Chinese Communist Revolution succeeded in 1949.

As the nephew of Francis Lister Hawks Pott, Wong was appointed director of the Shanghai Municipal Council in 1939, until the fall of Shanghai in 1941. He was also director of the St. Elizabeth Hospital and the St. Luke Hospital, as well as Chinese YMCA of Shanghai. During the Second Sino-Japanese War, Shanghai except for the International Settlement was fallen into Japanese hand. Wong voluntarily helped the injured Chinese soldiers and liaison with the Chinese government in Chongqing.

=== Kidnapping ===
In October 1940, his colleague, Sarcey T. Chen, vice-president of the American Engineering Corporation and president of the Shanghai Y's Men's Club, was taken away by the Wang Jingwei regime and executed after his plan to assassinate Wang Jingwei was found out.

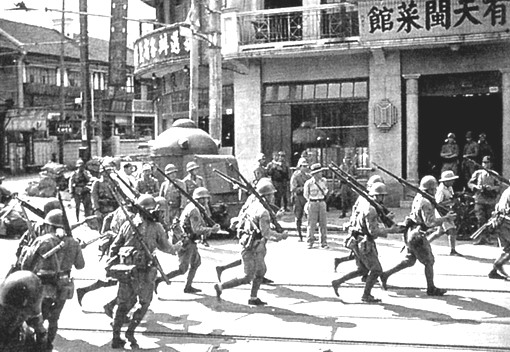
Japanese soldiers in Shanghai, 1937.

When it was time the Wang government agents were kidnapping many high-profile businessmen, Wong himself was kidnapped by four armed after a week on 12 October on Hart Road in front of his residence, witnessed by his brother. His family was asked for 5 million dollars cash. When he was released after 24 days, he lost twelve pounds and some of his hair. Wong wrote a book, The Black Hole of Shanghai about his kidnapping experience. He also wrote a semi-autographical fiction, The Mental Autobiography of Bill Lee. He changed his life view after the imprisonment, and became more active in charity works.

During the Japanese occupation, he was called or detained at the military police barrack for five times, two times at the Kinnear Road Barrack, two times at the Avenue Petain and one time at the Race Club Road.

Wong became the largest shareholder of the American Engineering Corporation after the deaths of Sarcey T. Chen and Roscoe L. Hambleton, company founder who joined the construction of Burma Road and was later killed in the Burma Campaign in August 1942. The other two shareholders, American broker Chester M. Wentworth and lawyer Paul Kops were interned after the fall of Shanghai.

He was the director of the Tung Wai Company, which imported coal, sugar and syrup, from 1939 to 1947, as well as the Zeus Chemical Pharmaceutical Factory, which produced sulfonamides, ointment and calcium, and the Parker Brewery Limited which made date wine. He had also properties in Bubbling Well Road. He joined the board of the St. John's University after President William Z. L. Sung, who was interned before, left for the United States after the war.

== Move to Hong Kong ==
=== Business career ===
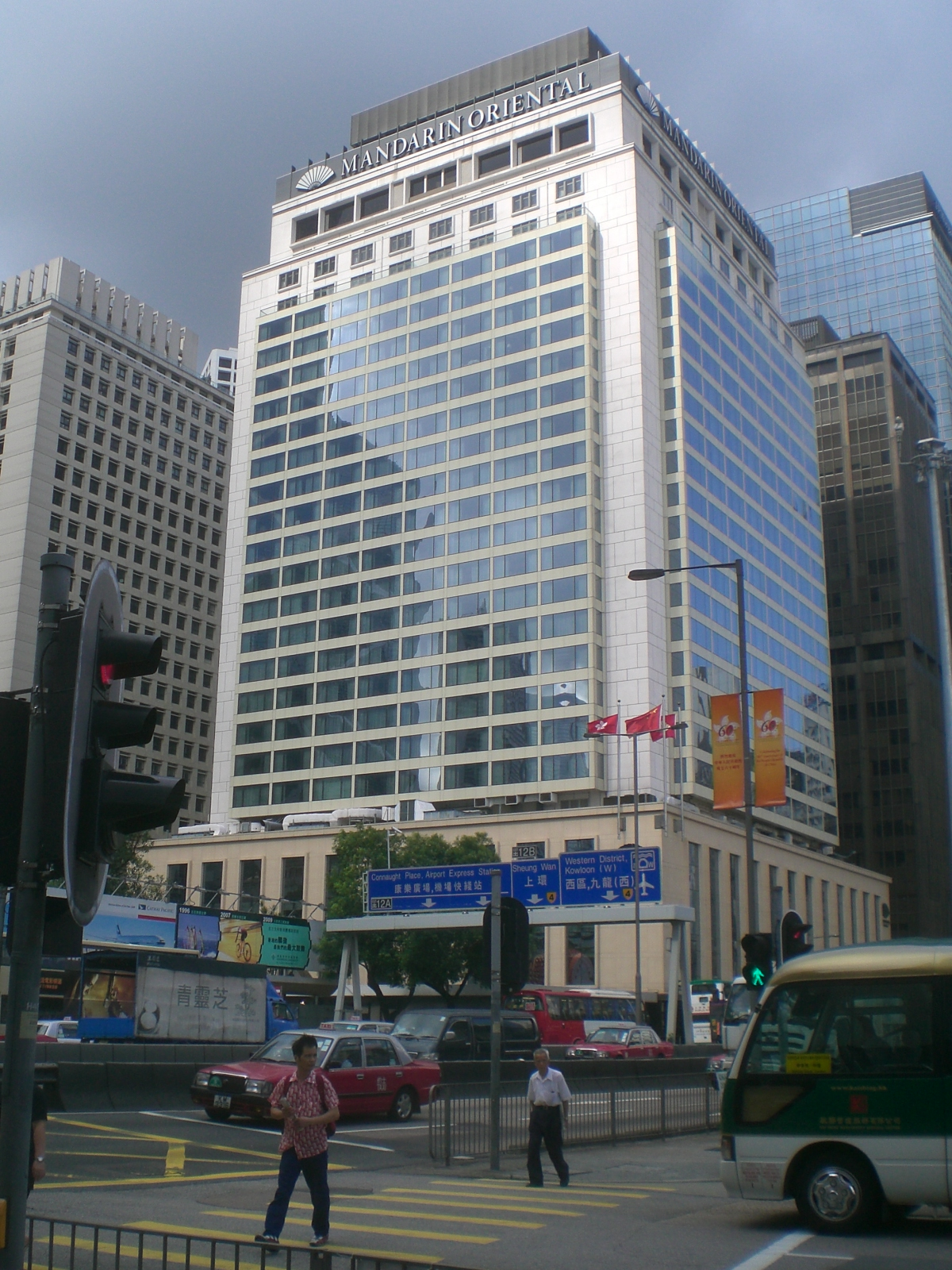
The Mandarin Oriental was installed by Wong's company with Carrier air conditioners.

Seeing the looming future of China in 1947, Wong moved to Hong Kong and set up a branch in the colony. At the time the Dodwell & Co. had become the agent of the Frigidaire refrigerators in Hong Kong, he had to take the less popular brand Crosley. After two years, his company became the agent of the Frigidaire. In November 1948, he took his family to Hong Kong.

His company received great success after it became the agent of the Carrier air conditioners. Wong's first contract was with an Indian restaurant and his first construction work was the Oriental Theatre on Fleming Road. He got the contract with King's Theatre subsequently. Besides all the air conditioners of the Jardine, Matheson & Co. properties were taken by the Jardine Engineering, agent of the York, most of the other air conditioning constructions at the time were done by Carrier, including Hotel President, Realty House, Dragon Seed, as well as Hong Kong Spinners and Central Textiles owned by Shanghainese industrialists. The notable exception was the five million dollars contract of the Mandarin Oriental in the early 60s, in which the Jardine taipans went for the better-quality Carrier. Wong also expanded his business in Okinawa, when island was governed by the US military.

In the 1970s, Wong faced competitions from the Japanese capitals such as Daikin and Mitsubishi. In 1978 when the gross revenue of his company had reached 100 million Hong Kong dollars, Wong decided to sell his shares and those of his deputy Edwin Tao Hsueh-chi and his son Wilfred Wong Yih-ming to the China Engineers of the Sime Darby.

=== Public services ===
Wong was also appointed to many public positions by the colonial government, including Board of Review, Renters' Advisory Committee, Advisory Committee Against Narcotics and Works Committee. In 1960, he was an appointed to the Urban Council of Hong Kong along with Li Fook-shu and Fung Hon-chu. He served on the Urban Council until 1968.

From 1965 to 1974, he served in the Legislative Council as an unofficial member, succeeding retiring Kenneth Fung Ping-fan. During his service in the Legislative Council, he was vocal on the business and financial development of the colony. He was the only one of the twelve unofficial members to vote against a bill on tax raise in 1966. In 1967 during the Leftist riots, he was the only Chinese Legislative Council unofficial member commented on the riots, supporting the government's high-handed measures on the rioters, which was also agreed by Dhun Jehangir Ruttonjee and Kenneth Albert Watson, the two other non-Chinese members.

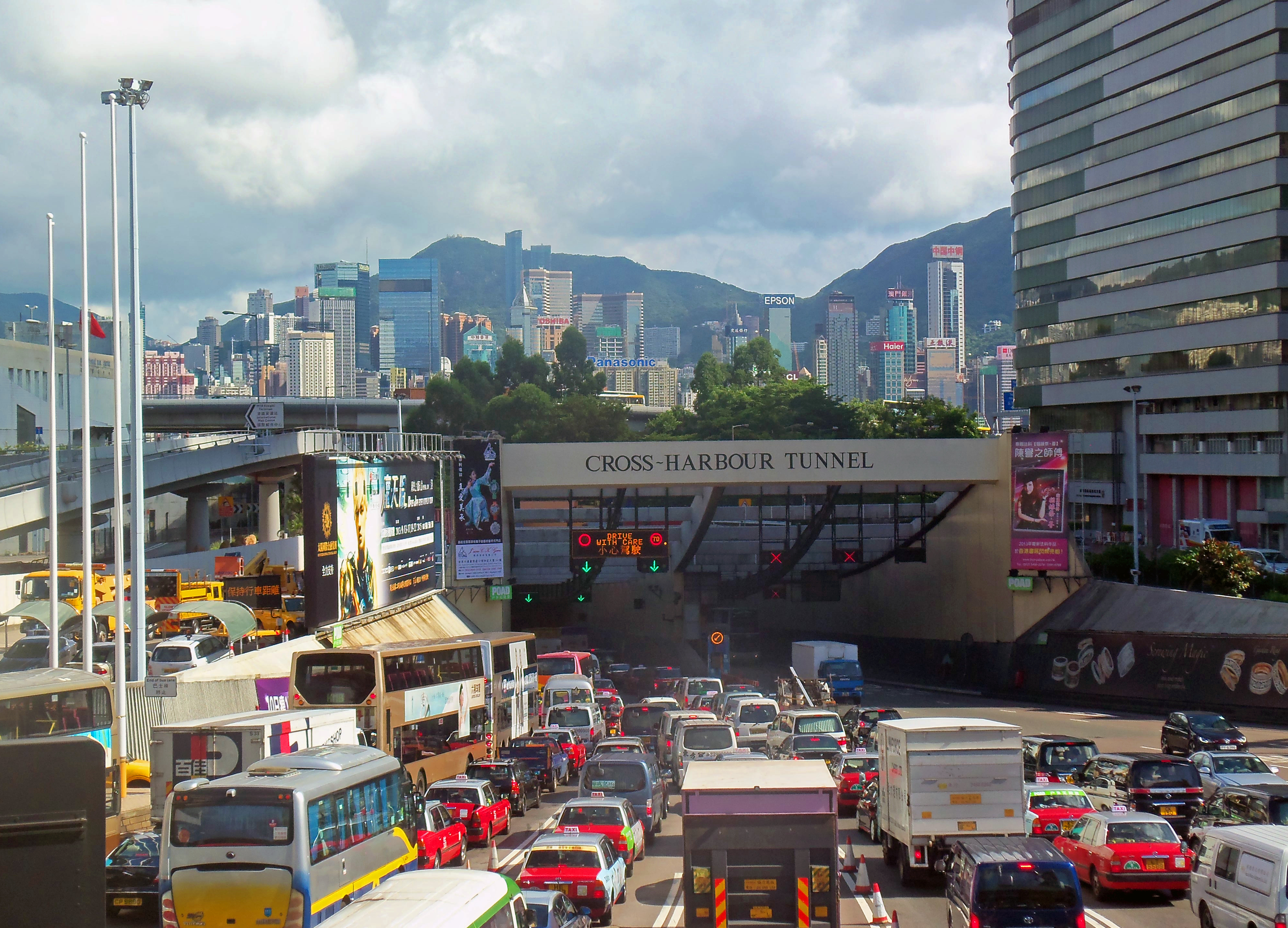
During Wong's service in the Legislative Council, the legislature passed the construction plan of the Cross-Harbour Tunnel.

He voted for the construction of the Cross-Harbour Tunnel, in which the bill was passed with 8 for 7 against in 1969. In April 1973, he and other unofficial members including Woo Pak-chuen, Szeto Wai and James Wu Man-hon led a rebellion against the government over the Crown Leases Bill 1973 which was to renew the approximately 5,000 renewable lots in the New Territories, mostly in New Kowloon, north of Boundary Street) that were expiring on 30 June 1973 as they opposed the re-assessed Crown rents on renewable leases. Wong argued that "for Government to charge what the market can bear is wrong in principle and practice."

For his public services, he was made Justice of the Peace in 1961 and was awarded the Officer of the Order of the British Empire (OBE) in 1967. In 1974, he was made Commander of the Order of the British Empire (CBE) with another Shanghainese mogul Run Run Shaw.

When the Hong Kong Anglican Church founded the Chung Chi College in 1950, his cousin James Pott became the vice-chancellor and Wong became the member of the college council in 1962. He was the chairman of the council from 1976 to 1981, at the time when the college had already been incorporated into the Chinese University of Hong Kong. He was also invited to become the founding chairman of the college council when his friends Mr and Mrs Henry Hu founded the Shue Yan College in 1971 and member of the council of the University of Hong Kong. He was also the chairman of the Hong Kong Red Cross in which he put efforts into promoting blood donation. He was also member of the Community Chest of Hong Kong, assistant commissioner of the Civil Aid Service and the president of the Rotary Club of Hong Kong.

== Personal life and death ==
Wong became British national in 1937. He was an Anglican. He enjoyed jogging and jogged every day nearby his residence at No. 110 Repulse Bay Road and swam at the Repulse Bay. He also start practising Judo after he was 60 years old. He was the co-founder of the Hong Kong Country Club with his Legislative Council colleagues, estate developer Richard Charles Lee and Jardine taipan Hugh Barton and was its first chairman.

Born and raised in Shanghai, he spoke fluent Shanghainese but was not good at Cantonese. To excel in the speech, he started learning Cantonese with his secretary and granddaughter.

On 28 June 1981, Wong died of a sudden heart attack when he was watching TV at home, aged 70. He married Looming How (1911–1999), the founder of the Commercial Press. He was survived by his son Wilfred Wong Yih-ming, born in 1935 and a daughter.
