= Leung Wai-tung =

Leung Wai-tung MBE, JP
- 梁煒彤

Member of the Legislative Council
- In office 2 October 1988 – 22 August 1991
- Appointed by: Sir David Wilson

Personal details
- Born: 1946 (age 79–80) Hong Kong
- Party: Democratic Foundation (1989–91)
- Education: Belilios Public School; University of Hong Kong (BA, MPhil)
- Occupation: University lecturer

Diana Leung Wai-tung, MBE, JP (Chinese: 梁煒彤; born 1946) is a former member of the Legislative Council of Hong Kong.

== Biography ==
Leung studied at the Belilios Public School and attend the University of Hong Kong, obtained her bachelor's degree in geography and geology in 1968 and master's degree in urban geography in 1973. She worked as a lecturer at Department of Geography and Geology at Hong Kong University.

== Political career ==
She was appointed to the Legislative Council by Governor David Wilson in 1988. She and Edward Leong and Jimmy McGregor, two other legislators, launched the Hong Kong Democratic Foundation in 1989 and Leung served as the founding vice-chairperson, which was seen as pro-democratic liberal political group at the time. She was one of the only three appointed members who affiliated with political organisation (the other two being Maria Tam and Lau Wong-fat). She soon quit the foundation citing her difference with the mainstream members.

She was considered as radical among the majority of the appointed and pro-government legislative councillors, as she and Szeto Wah urged for repealing the government's regulation of political activities in schools, instead of moderating as the government revised on the Education (Amendment) Bill. She was also the only appointed member to vote against the Trade Description Amendment Bill of 1991, a bill that sparked criticism from labour groups.

She was also the member of the Hong Kong Housing Authority from 1985 until her resignation on 5 November 1996.

She was one of the six female candidates in the 1991 Legislative Council election, the first ever direct election in the territory but was defeated by the candidates from the United Democrats of Hong Kong, notably Martin Lee in Hong Kong Island East.
