= Price Sanond =

Price Sanond Limited (also known as "PriceSanond") is an internationally oriented law firm based in Bangkok, serving a broad range of multinational corporations having business operations in Thailand.

The firm was founded in 1969 by Harvey Price, an American lawyer who had come to Thailand in 1962 serving in the U.S. Peace Corps, Group 1, and PriceSanond is thus one of Thailand’s oldest law firms.

The firm practiced under the name of "Price Sanond Prabhas & Wynne" until 1991, when it became associated with the U.S. law firm of "Graham & James" and the Hong Kong law firm of "Deacons" and changed its name to "Deacons Graham & James."

In 1992, the firm in Bangkok expanded its international network by becoming associated with the Australian law firm of "Sly & Weigall" (which also became part of "Deacons Graham & James").

The alliance between Deacons and Graham & James dissolved in June 2000, with Deacons backing out due to Graham & James's failure to commit resources to Asia and dwindling position in US law firm rankings. During that time, Price Sanond remained associated with and practiced under the name Deacons until end of 2011 when it reverted to the old name (two years after Deacons Australia joined Norton Rose).

Mr. Price served for many years as the firm’s managing partner, and is now retired. Andrew Wynne, the current Managing Partner, came to Thailand in 1971, and has been with the firm since 1977.
