= Goldsack =

Goldsack is a surname. Notable people with the surname include:

- Drew Goldsack (born 1981), Canadian cross country skier
- Elsie Goldsack Pittman (1904–1975), English tennis player
- George MacDonald Goldsack (1902–1969), British businessman
- Jennifer Goldsack (born 1982), American rower
- Tyson Goldsack (born 1987), Australian rules football player
- William Goldsack (1871–1957), Australian Baptist missionary
