= Thomas Clydesdale =

Thomas Clydesdale JP

Member of the Legislative Council
- In office 30 October 1985 – 25 August 1988
- Succeeded by: Jimmy McGregor
- Constituency: Commercial (First)

Personal details
- Born: 1934 Edinburgh, Scotland
- Died: 4 May 2007 (aged 73) Delray Beach, Florida, U.S.
- Spouse: Claire Hendrixson
- Children: 3
- Education: George Heriot's School; University of Edinburgh
- Occupation: Accountant

Thomas Clydesdale, JP (1934, Edinburgh, Scotland – 2007) was a former member of the Legislative Council of Hong Kong.

Clydesdale was born and brought up in Edinburgh, Scotland. He attended George Heriot's School and the University of Edinburgh. He became a certificated public accountant and member of the Institute of Chartered Accountants of Scotland. He was also a fellow of the Hong Kong Society of Accountants and the president of the Society in 1982. Clydesdale was an accountant with Lowe Bingham & Matthews (now PricewaterhouseCoopers) from 1959 until he retired as senior partner in 1989.

He was the president of the Hong Kong General Chamber of Commerce between 1986 and 1987 and Chamber's representative in the Legislative Council through the Commercial (First) functional constituency.
