= Patrick Shiu =

Hong Kong-Canadian doctor

Patrick Shiu Kin-yin (Chinese: 蕭健英) is a Hong Kong-Canadian doctor. He is the former chairman of the Hong Kong Democratic Foundation from 1992 and 1997 and former Election Committee member for Medical subsector elected in 1998. He is also a former core member of the Hong Kong Medical Association.
