= Graham & James =

Defunct American law firm

Graham & James LLP was a law firm. It was founded as Graham & Morse by Chalmers Graham and Clarence Morse in San Francisco in 1934. Morse left the firm to become chair of the Federal Maritime Commission, and Leonard James, a maritime lawyer who had become friends with Graham and Morse while working for the War Shipping Administration during World War II, became a name partner. The firm was originally a small firm focused on the maritime industry.

The firm was active in Asia as early as the 1950s, when it sent one of its lawyers to Tokyo. It formed a strategic alliance with the Deacons law firm in Hong Kong and the Price Sanond law firm in Bangkok, operating in Asia under the collective name "Deacons Graham & James."

With the bulk of its practice focused on the Pacific Rim, Graham & James was severely affected by the Asian economic crisis of the 1990s. By then, it was primarily an intellectual property and technology firm, with California and Asian offices. Graham & James attempted to merge with the New York firm of Reid & Priest in 1991, and also had a partnership with the Seattle law firm of Riddell Williams from 1995 to 1999. As of June 1999 it had around 340 attorneys. The alliance with Deacons dissolved in June 2000, with Deacons backing out due to G&J's failure to commit resources to Asia and dwindling position in US law firm rankings.

In June 2000, it effected two transactions. Reflecting internal divisions among its partners and affiliates, most partners in the California, Tokyo and Beijing offices of the firm merged with Squire, Sanders & Dempsey, while the New York office, largely devoted to pharmaceutical patent prosecution, merged with Greenberg Traurig.
