= Perth Convention and Exhibition Centre =

Convention centre in Perth, Western Australia

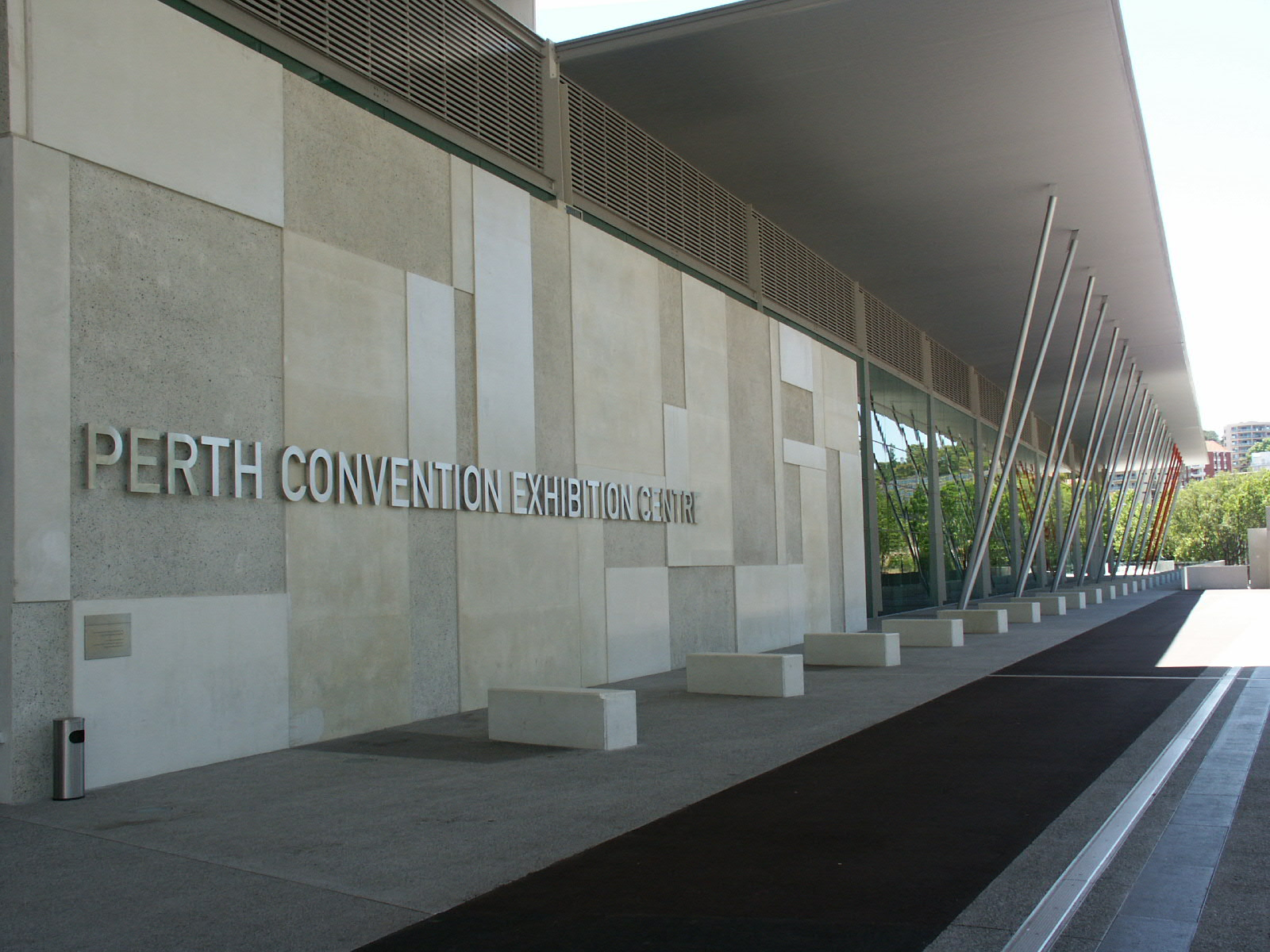
- Interactive map of the Perth Convention and Exhibition Centre area

General information
- Type: Convention centre
- Location: Mounts Bay Road; Perth
- Coordinates: 31°57′25″S 115°51′14″E
- Current tenants: Wyllie Group; Brookfield
- Construction started: 2001
- Completed: 26 August 2004; 21 years ago
- Management: Spotless

Technical details
- Floor area: 16,500 m^{2} (178,000 sq ft)

Design and construction
- Architect: Cox Architecture
- Developer: Government of Western Australia
- Main contractor: Multiplex

Other information
- Seating capacity: 2,500 (Riverside theatre)

Website
- www.pcec.com.au

The Perth Convention and Exhibition Centre is a privately owned convention centre in Perth, Western Australia.

== Description ==
The centre has a floor space of 16,000 square metres (172,223 sq ft) and can cater for 5,000 delegates. It contains state-of-the-art technical facilities, six exhibition pavilions, a 2,500 seat tiered theatre, banquet/ballrooms and 23 meeting rooms.

== History ==
Premier Richard Court, announced in November 2000 that a contract had been signed with Multiplex after five months of negotiations. Construction was to commence in June 2001 with a late 2003 completion date.

Built by Multiplex at a cost of A$225 million, equivalent to A$354.5 million in 2022, it was officially opened on 26 August 2004 by Premier Geoff Gallop. Its construction was extremely controversial, owing to an overblown budget and an unprepossessing external appearance. It has been described as a "Soviet-era mausoleum" and a "giant grey cockroach", as well as a white elephant whose financial viability has been questionable. However, it made it possible for Perth to host the 2011 Commonwealth Heads of Government Meeting (CHOGM), with heads of state and official delegates of more than 50 member countries.

The Wyllie Group have a 35-year lease on the centre until 2039. It is managed by Spotless, who committed to spend A$50 million over 22 years starting in 2016, equivalent to A$58.4 million in 2022, ensuring Perth Convention and Exhibition Centre remains a major destination for national and international events and provides economic value for Perth and Western Australia.

In 2016 the Perth Convention and Exhibition Centre attracted more than 900,000 visitors, including 98,000 national and international delegates. However, a report released that same year by the Tourism Council of Western Australia asserted that the centre should be expanded with an additional 10,000 square metres (107,639 sq ft) of space in order to remain competitive. In 2019, it was found that the underground carpark was experiencing subsidence issues. In 2022, Brookfield purchased a 50 percent stake in the centre.

In January 2024, the Government of Western Australia revealed plans by Wyllie Group and Brookfield to upgrade the centre. The proposal included expanding capacity as well as building a new waterfront area with direct access to the Swan River with three jetties and a floating performance stage, and a new pedestrian bridge connecting the centre to Elizabeth Quay. Wyllie Group had hoped the upgrade would be completed by 2029, however in November 2025 the State Government cancelled the A$1.6 billion upgrade project to free up funds for three major hospital projects instead.

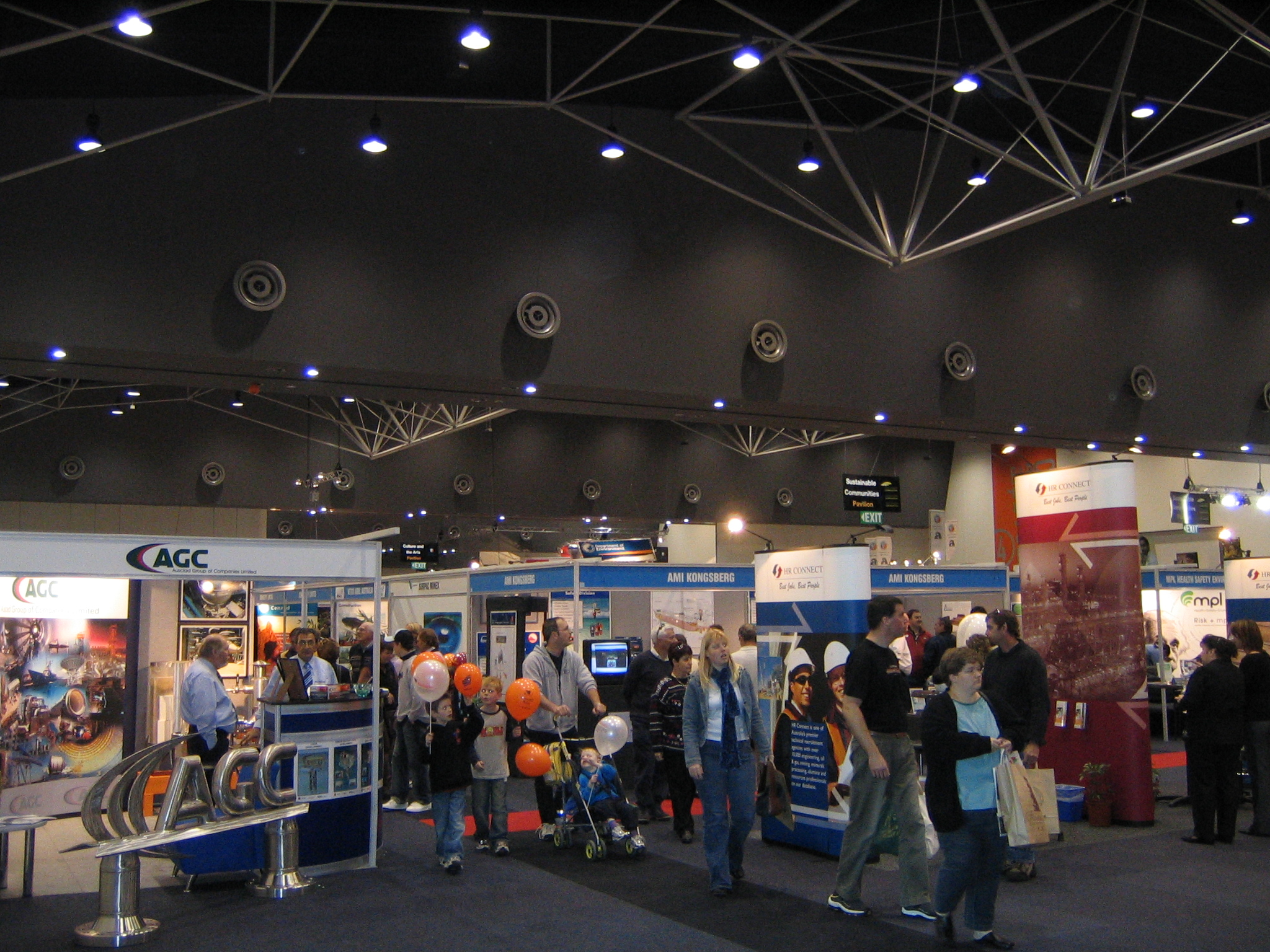
Pavilion interior

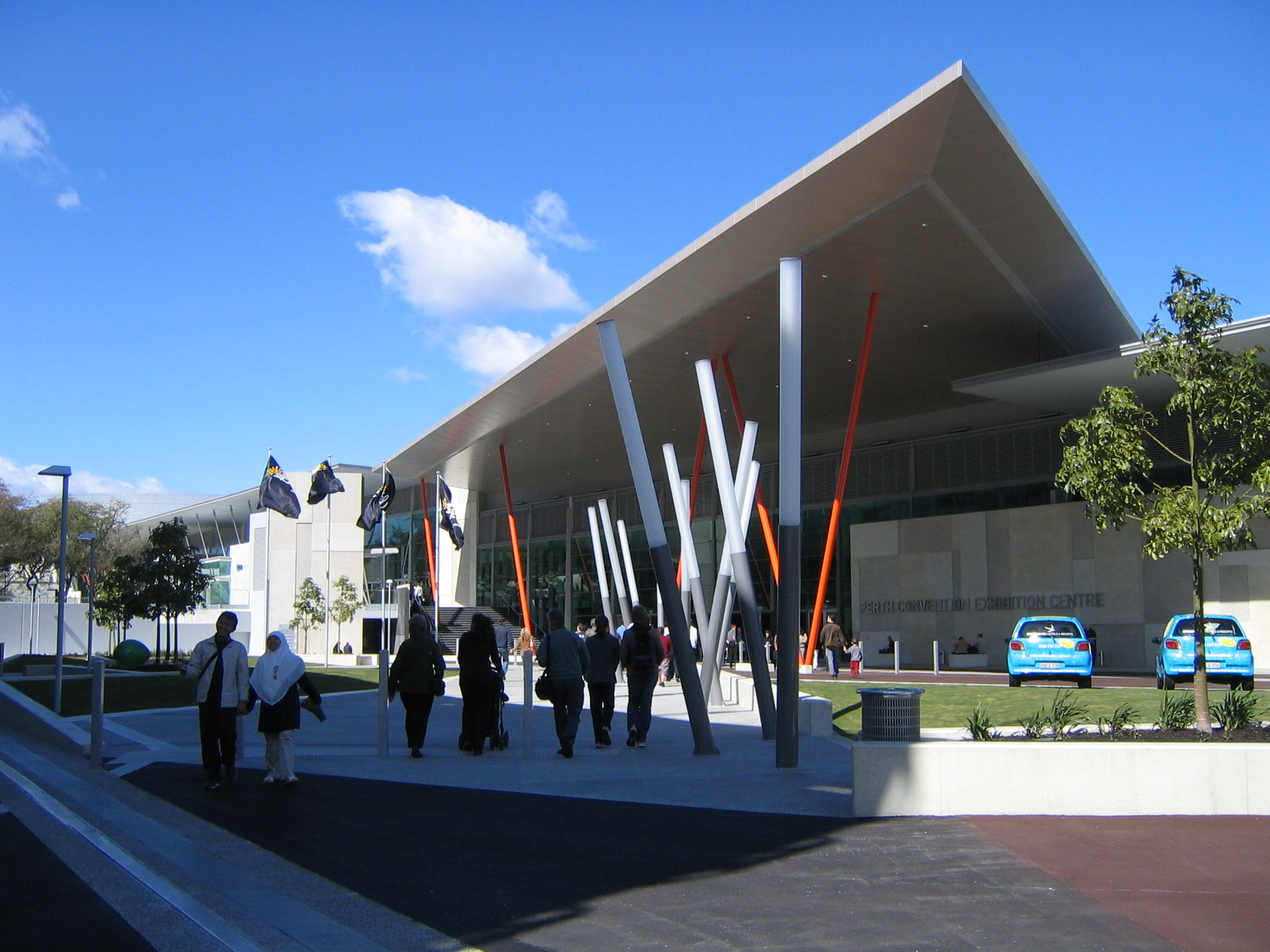
Entrance

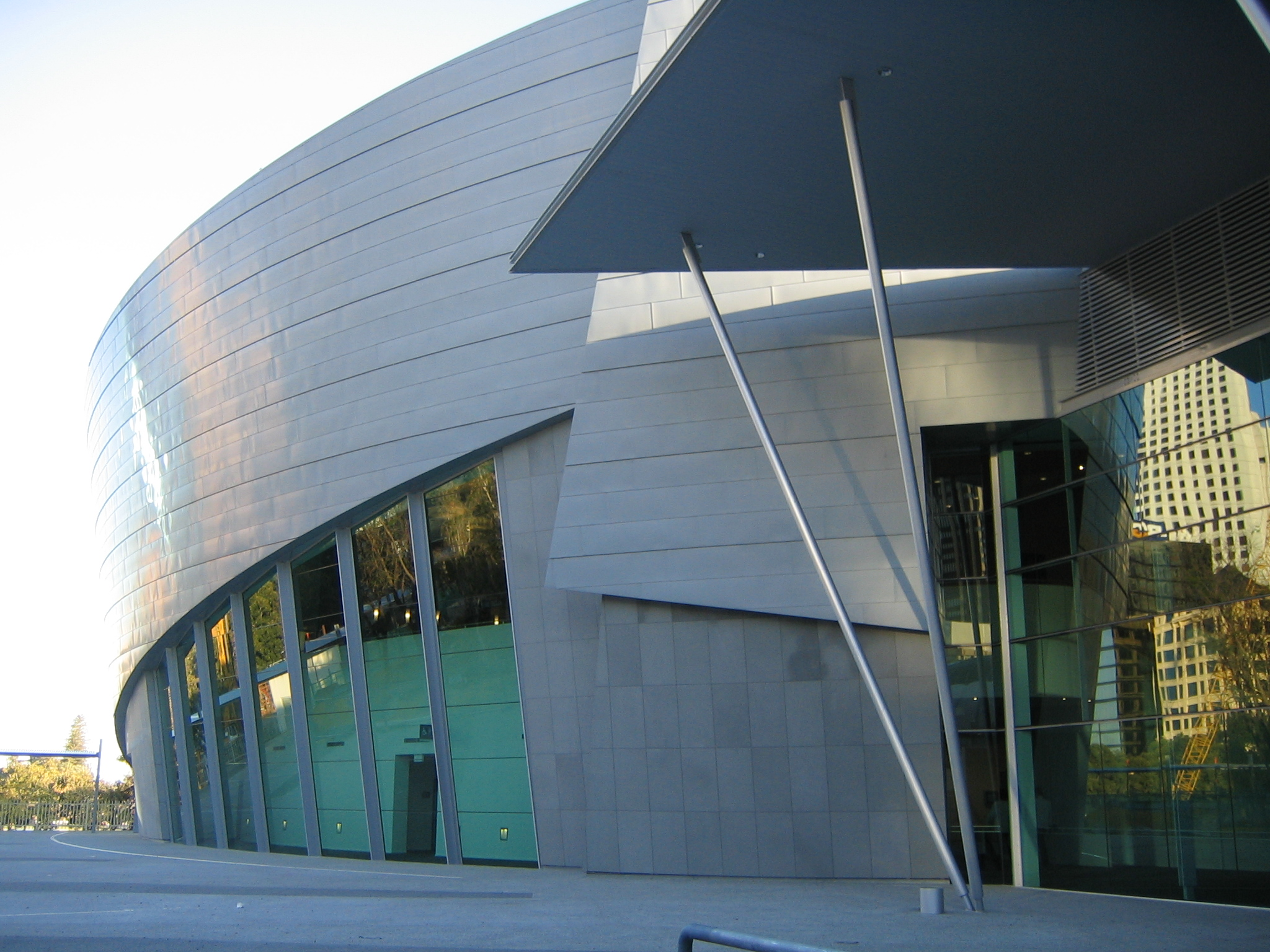
Ballroom and meeting room exterior

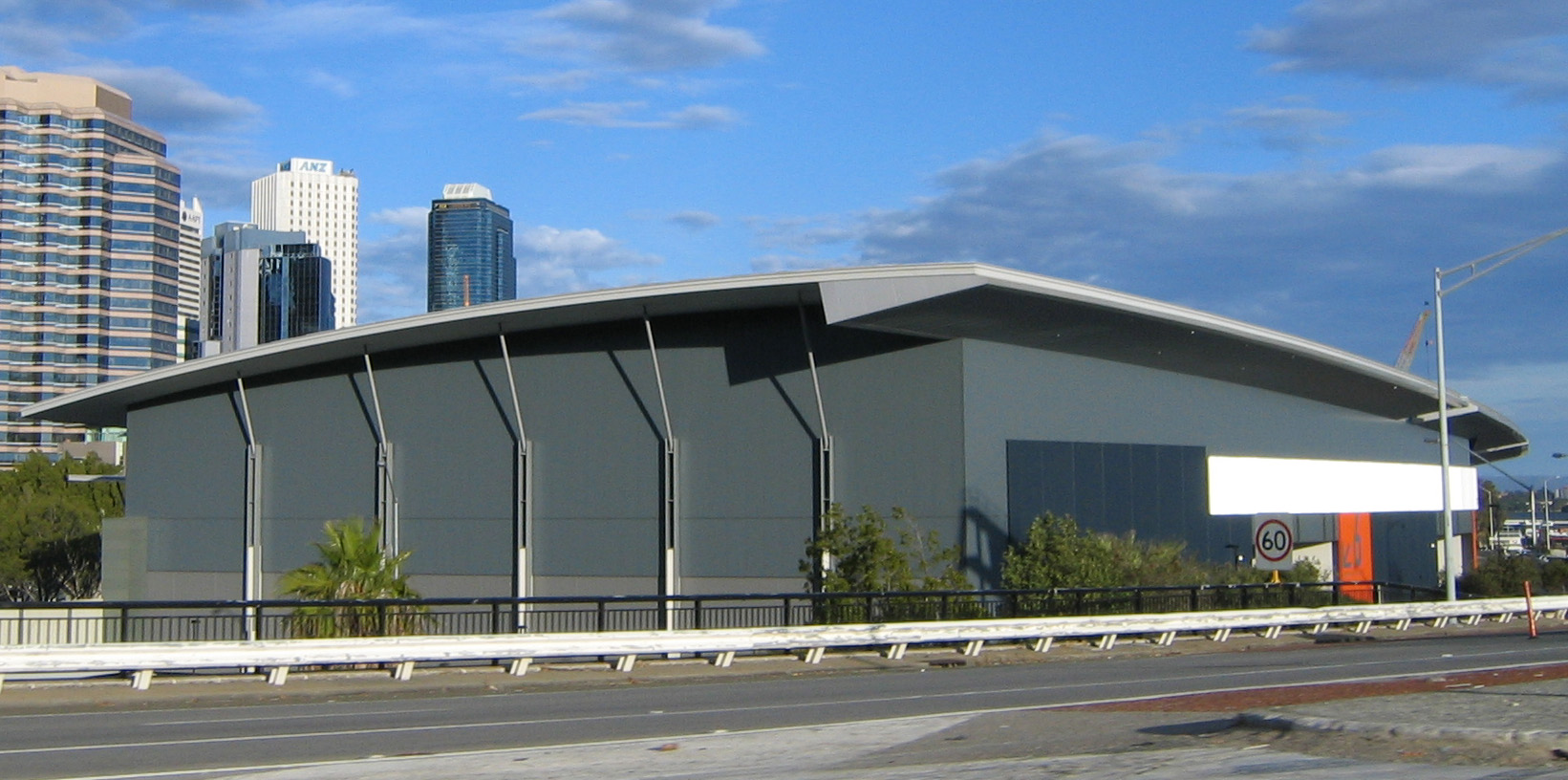
Western side viewed from Kwinana Freeway

== Location ==
The centre is between Mounts Bay Road and the Mitchell Freeway off-ramp, with Elizabeth Quay east just beyond Elizabeth Quay railway station.

== Operations ==
It is the only purpose-built convention centre in Western Australia and can cater for functions of up to 5,000 delegates. The project was aimed at attracting major conventions to Perth, with the state's tourism and hospitality industries in mind.

The centre has two public lifts, one travelling from the underground car park, through level one, concluding at level two; the other from level two to level three.

== Events ==
- Sexpo
- Kingdomcity
- Channel Seven Perth Telethon (2004–2019)
- Madman Anime Festival
- Oz Comic Con
- Perth Home Show
- Perth Motor Show
- Skills West Expo
- Supanova Pop Culture Expo (since 2014)
- Wai-Con
- Commonwealth Heads of Government Meeting 2011
