= Hong Kong Democratic Foundation =

- 香港民主促進會
- Formation: 27 October 1989
- Type: Public policy think tank
- Chairman: Paul Zimmerman (Since 16 September 2015)
- Website: hkdf.org

The Hong Kong Democratic Foundation (Chinese: 香港民主促進會; HKDF) is a Hong Kong public policy think tank established initially as a political party on 27 October 1989. The Foundation was founded in the run up to the first Legislative Council direct elections of 1991 by a group of business people and professionals who endorsed democratic ideals led by Jimmy McGregor and Dr Leong Che-hung. The Foundation later transformed itself into a think tank and is currently chaired by Paul Zimmerman.

== Beliefs ==
The HKDF positions itself as an independent, multi-racial, multi-cultural political think tank made up of local people committed to shaping government policy in order to make Hong Kong a more open, progressive society in which all people can share the fruits of its success.

The political view of the HKDF is liberal and pro-democracy. However, the HKDF has kept its political discussion within the territory of Hong Kong and has stayed away from criticism of Mainland China. HKDF is one of the earliest advocates of competition policy in Hong Kong and it seems to have a strong pro-market view in terms of its economic policy but it also seems to have a strong social agenda as it supports minimum wage legislation in Hong Kong. Tony Latter said in his book Hands on or Hands Off? The Nature of Economic Policy in Hong Kong that the HKDF "... represents business and professional people sympathetic to democratic ideals". The HKDF "...has remained consistent in its (economic) philosophy, but beyond such general statements of support for Hong Kong's traditional values, has had little influence over the formulation of policy", said Tony Latter.

== History ==
=== Political party ===
The HKDF was established on 27 October 1989 and was inaugurated on 11 January 1990 by Jimmy McGregor and Dr Leong Che-hung as a political party. It consisted of business people and professionals who endorsed democratic ideals but wanted to keep their distance from the United Democrats of Hong Kong, formed in 1990 by the pro-democratic activists. The HKDF had four seats in the Legislative Council when it was founded: Mr Jimmy McGregor, Dr Leong Che-hung, Ms Leung Wai-tung and Mr Chan Ying-lun. Dr C.H.Leong chaired the HKDF when it was founded but the chairmanship was soon passed on to another medical doctor, Dr Patrick Shiu Kin-ying in April 1992, who served as HKDF's second chairman until 1997. The HKDF contested the first legislative council direct election in 1991 but won two seats. Dr C.H.Leong later left the HKDF to join Meeting Point, which later merged with the United Democrats of Hong Kong to form the pro-democracy flagship party Democratic Party, but Dr C.H. Leong did not join the Democratic Party.

The HKDF later lost the last seat in the Legislative Council when Jimmy McGregor stopped contesting the Commercial (First), the Hong Kong General Chamber of Commerce's functional constituency election in September 1995. Jimmy McGregor was later appointed to Governor Chris Patten's Executive Council in October 1995, but he stayed with the HKDF as a senior member and mentor until his retirement to Canada in 1997. HKDF members admit that McGregor probably had more influence than others on shaping HKDF's political, economic and public service philosophy.

=== Think tank ===
The HKDF started its full-scale transformation to become a political and public policy think tank when Alan Lung Ka-lun took over as its third chairman from Patrick Shiu Kin-ying in 1997. Alan stepped down in September 2015 and he was succeeded by Paul Zimmerman, a naturalised Chinese citizen of HKSAR. Today, the HKDF positions itself as an independent, multi-racial, multi-cultural political think tank, focusing on the development and promotion of policies and the primary activity is to seek to influence Hong Kong's economic, political and social development. It says that it aims to accomplish those goals through the production of position papers on relevant topics; developed within the framework of its policies and principles.

The HKDF has a record of hosting constitutional reform seminars and proposing constitutional reform packages. It also holds monthly luncheons addressed by guest speakers on various topics. Additionally, it holds meetings with experts, legislators and organisations for the exchange of ideas and the promotion of its proposals.

== Chairmen ==
- Leong Che-hung, 1989–1992
- Patrick Shiu Kin-ying, 1992–1997
- Alan Lung Ka-lun, 1997–2015
- Paul Zimmerman, 2015–present

== Election performance ==
=== Legislative Council elections ===
| Election | Number of popular votes | % of popular votes | GC seats | FC seats | EC seats | Total seats | +/− |
|---|---|---|---|---|---|---|---|
| 1991 | 19,806 | 1.45 | 0 | 2 | — | 2 / 60 | ▼1 |

=== Municipal elections ===
| Election | Number of popular votes | % of popular votes | UrbCo seats | RegCo seats | Total elected seats |
|---|---|---|---|---|---|
| 1995 | 1,693 | 0.30 | 0 | 0 | 0 / 59 |

=== District Board elections ===
| Election | Number of popular votes | % of popular votes | Total elected seats | +/− |
|---|---|---|---|---|
| 1991 | 8,667 | 1.63 | 3 / 272 | |
| 1994 | 4,048▼ | 0.59▼ | 3 / 346 | 0 |
| 1999 | 1,392▼ | 0.17▼ | 1 / 390 | 0 |
