= Wai-Con =

Defunct anime convention in Australia

- Status: Defunct
- Venue: Perth Convention Exhibition Centre
- Locations: Perth, Western Australia
- Country: Australia
- Inaugurated: 2004
- Most recent: 2014
- Attendance: 5,027 in 2014
- Organizer: Perth Anime Convention Incorporated

Wai-Con was an annual anime convention held in Perth, Western Australia. The convention was held over two days and aimed to promote Japanese culture (especially anime and manga) to the general community. Wai-Con was created by and run by the non-profit incorporation Perth Anime Convention (PAniC).

== Programming ==
A variety of events are run at Wai-Con, including:

- Several rooms set up for anime screenings
- Panels on a wide variety of topics, related directly and indirectly to the target audience's interests
- Traders, selling relevant goods
- Two cosplay competitions (one per day)
- Anime Music Video competitions
- Art competitions
- Video game competitions
- Trading Card Game tournaments
- Card Trading
- Cosplay Photos taken

== History ==
In September 2003, a group of fans and representatives from the three major Perth anime clubs assembled to create the beginnings of the first convention under the working title "WestCon". As the idea developed and PAniC became incorporated, the Wai-Con name was formally adopted. While the prefix of WAI was never officially given a meaning, fans have come up with their own interpretations such as "Western Anime Insanity" or "Western Anime Invasion". Unofficially, it was chosen to pay homage to the Japanese shout of joy.

On the 11th-12 December 2004 at the Arts precinct of the University of Western Australia, the first Wai-Con was held. Fans were treated to a two-day cosplay competition, artwork displays, many traders selling Japanese goods, anime music videos, as well as the latest anime screenings. Over two days approximately 400 people visited the convention, greatly exceeding the expectations of the organisers.

Due to renovations at the previous location, Wai-Con 2005 was held at the Economics/Commerce/Law (ECL) precinct of Murdoch University on the 10–11 December. New events at Wai-Con 2005 were the introduction of video games to the roster, as well as the anime game show "PANIC Button". Approximately 700 people turned out over the entire weekend.

After the sharp increase in attendance the previous year, Wai-Con 2006 left the university venues and was held at Arena Joondalup on the 9–10 December. Wai-Con 06 added new con-day entertainment such as the Sumo suits and martial arts demonstrations, and introduced the Fund-raising Auction as part of the Closing Ceremony. This was also the first year an Official Theme was introduced, which was Space Cadets. Perhaps owing to the venue being more remote from the city centre, Wai-Con 06 boasted only a moderate increase in numbers, with official attendance figures at 850 people.

Bowing to the combined pressure from fans and traders for a closer venue, Wai-Con 2007 was held at the Perth Convention Exhibition Centre on the 15–16 December with a theme of Spies. Official estimates for Wai-con 07 gave a total weekend attendance of over 1600 people, almost double the attendance in 2006. Over 450 people waited in line for the con to open on Saturday morning, and a total of approximately 1200 people had stepped through at day's end. Sunday saw an estimated total of 1000.

Throughout 2007, PAniC polled their members in a general survey. One of the questions asked members what month they preferred to have the convention. One of the reasons was due to the organisational issues involved for holding a convention in the December period. The outcome of the survey resulted in the decision to move the convention from December to January, and no convention being held in 2008. The next convention would then be held in January 2009.

On the weekend of 31 January, Wai-con 2009 was held. The theme for that year was Steampunk. Due to the efforts of the committee in promoting the convention, the attendance rose to 3190 people, an almost 100% increase from the previous year. This marked increase in attendance showed, with massive lines at the entrance before the con opened, and the vendors' hall and the main theatre being filled to the hired capacity.

The 2010 convention was held on the 23 and 24 January. The theme was Angels and Demons, and a total of 3442 people attended the convention over two days. The convention was marked by a performance from seven members of the Eminence Symphony Orchestra, an anime and videogame themed orchestra. Eminence also brought with them Yasunori Mitsuda, a videogame composer famous for his work on such titles as Chrono Trigger, and several of his pieces were played during the concert.

Following the tradition, Wai-Con 2011 was held again on the final weekend of January. The theme for that year was "Sports". The convention saw a modest increase of 237 patrons, bringing the grand total to 3679 attendees. This convention marked the first voice actor appearances for Wai-Con bringing over international guests, Spike Spencer and Donna Burke. Both of these two guests have voiced in numerous anime and video games and were well received by the attendees.

On 28 and 29 January, PAniC held the 8th annual Wai-Con. The theme for this year was 'Invasion'. Once again, the convention saw a modest increase of attendees, reaching the highest number yet of 3750. Wai-Con 2012 brought back the Saturday night event, with comedian John Robertson performing "Dragon Punch Turbo". Along with John, international artist, Kelly 'Coelasquid' Turnbull, came to Wai-Con to show her work and run panels about the comic book industry.

In 2013, on 2 and 3 February, Wai-Con returns for its 9th convention. The theme for this year's Wai-Con is 'Circuit'. Due to Australia Day being the last weekend in January, Wai-Con was moved to the first weekend in February. Due to increase attendance, Wai-Con has moved the traders hall from the foyer into Pavilion 1 in the Perth Convention and Exhibition Centre. In 2013 Wai-Con achieved its greatest attendance to date with 4109 people at the convention over the weekend.

2014 was Wai-Con's big 10 year anniversary and a record-breaking 5027 people attended. Changes were made to the policy regarding minors, getting rid of the need for permission slips. Despite some setbacks with their guests, Wai-Con welcomed Bryce Papenbrook and Tiffany Grant as their special guests.

2015 did not hold a Wai-Con due to decision to postpone by membership at a SGM. There was an event in February 2015 called Ani-Games Showdown run by PAniC to help raise funds for future Wai-Cons.

In 2018, it was announced that PAniC would officially be dissolved, therefore ending plans for a future Wai-Con.

=== Event History ===
Year	Dates	Venue	Theme	President	Attendance	Guests
2004	11–12 December	University of WA	Journey to the West	Justin Bairstow	400	
2005	10–11 December	Murdoch University	Fantasy	Wade Allen	700	
2006	9–10 December	Arena Joondalup	Space Cadets	Trina Tan	850	
2007	15–16 December	Perth Convention Exhibition Centre	Spies	Hew Tromans	1,700	
2009	31 January & 1 February	Perth Convention Exhibition Centre	Steampunk	Mike Browner	3,190	
2010	23–24 January	Perth Convention Exhibition Centre	Angels and Demons	Mirai Raine	3,442	Eminence Symphony Orchestra, Yasunori Mitsuda
2011	29–30 January	Perth Convention Exhibition Centre	Sports	Wade Allen	3,679	Spike Spencer, Donna Burke
2012	28–29 January	Perth Convention Exhibition Centre	Invasion	Christopher Bobridge	3,750	Kelly 'Coelasquid' Turnbull, John Robertson
2013	2–3 February	Perth Convention Exhibition Centre	Circuit	Mike Browner	4,109	Kyle Hebert, Kara Edwards
2014	1–2 March	Perth Convention Exhibition Centre	Celebrating 10 Years	Mike Browner	5,027	Tiffany Grant, Bryce Papenbrook
2015	1–2 March	Postponed	N/A	Michael Cogan	N/A	
2016	13 February	Postponed	N/A	Christina Lee	N/A	

== Organizers ==
The Perth Anime Convention Incorporated (PAniC inc) is the name of the group responsible for running Wai-Con. It was formed in September 2003, though it was only formally made into a non-profit incorporation a few months later.

=== PAniC Honour Roll ===
PAniC officially recognises and honours those who have given a great amount of their time and effort for PAniC and Wai-Con.

Year	Name		
2009	Wendy Chew	Trina Tan	
2010	Leah Crichton		
2011	Wade Allen		
2012	Mirai Raine	Eugene O'Sullivan	Jon Hayward
2013	John Robertson		
2014	Mike Browner		

== Mascots ==
The mascots for each year is decided through an open design competition based on the set theme for the convention, with the then current committee judging and choosing a winner.

For The 2012 convention it was decided to make Watami a permanent mascot of Wai-Con. Watami was join by the second permanent mascot in 2013. Paco the boy who was riding a pig in 2009 was aged slightly and became the second mascot of Wai-Con

Year	Theme	Artist	Mascot
2004	Journey to the West	-	-
2005	Fantasy	Min L	-
2006	Space Cadets	-	-
2007	Spies	Ken B	-
2009	Steampunk	Erry H	A boy and his pig
2010	Angels and Demons	Marie F	
2011	Sports	Erry H	
2012	Invasion	Karis T	Watami
2013	Circuit	Emily S	Watami and Paco
2014	Anniversary	Emily S	Watami and Paco
2015	No mascot		
2016	Heroes	Emily S	Watami and Paco
