= Paul Cheng =

Hong Kong entrepreneur and politician

Paul Cheng 鄭明訓 JP

Member of the Provisional Legislative Council
- In office 21 December 1996 – 30 June 1998

Member of the Legislative Council
- In office 11 October 1995 – – 30 June 1997
- Preceded by: Jimmy McGregor
- Constituency: Commercial (First)
- In office 12 October 1988 – 22 August 1991
- Appointed by: Sir David Wilson

Personal details
- Born: 19 October 1936 (age 89) Xiamen, China
- Children: 5
- Education: University of Pennsylvania; Lake Forest College
- Occupation: Entrepreneur

Paul Cheng Ming-fun, JP (born 19 October 1936, Xiamen) is a Hong Kong entrepreneur and politician. He was first appointed to Legislative Council in 1988 and was the LegCo member for the Commercial (First) constituency (1995–97) and also the Provisional Legislative Council (1996–98). He was the chairman of the Hong Kong General Chamber of Commerce from 1992 to 1994 and honorary steward of the Hong Kong Jockey Club.

Legislative Council of Hong Kong
New parliament	Member of Provisional Legislative Council; 1997–1998	Replaced by Legislative Council
