= Bill Wyllie =

Western Australian businessman

Bill Wyllie (9 October 1932 – 13 March 2006) was a Western Australian businessman who was best known for his career as a "corporate doctor" in Hong Kong; and most notably for his role in setting up Hutchison Whampoa. In 2003, Australia's Business Review Weekly estimated that his personal wealth was approximately $450 million. The Wyllie Group, which he founded in 1991, has interests in mining and real estate, as well as formerly having a minority interest in the Burswood Casino.

== Early career ==
Wyllie was born in Perth, Western Australia in 1932. His parents divorced when he was eight, and he spent a brief period in an orphanage while his mother looked for work in the country areas of Western Australia. His mother rented a small house at Scarborough in 1942. At the age of 11, Wyllie successfully applied for a job as a post boy at 15 shillings a week. He left school at the age of 13, and worked in timber mills while studying to be a motor mechanic. After gaining qualifications as a mechanic, he completed correspondence courses in automotive and aeronautical engineering.

In 1952, he joined Wearne Brothers, an Australian automotive and heavy equipment distribution company working from Singapore learning business skills. He was also a successful racing car driver, with a car that he built himself.

The Singapore Straits Times sponsored his entry in the 1958 Macau Grand Prix where he made friends with one of his sponsors Bob Harper, an American based in Hong Kong.

== Hong Kong career ==
Harper advised Wyllie that his automotive business was struggling at the Macau Grand Prix of 1963. He invited Wyllie to review its operations, resulting in Wyllie recommending that the company be restructured and staffing levels reduced. His proposals were agreed to by creditors, including a moratorium on repayments. Wyllie was appointed as managing director, receiving a third of the shares.

The company returned to profitability and was renamed as Harpers International. By 1968, the company had become Hong Kong's most successful automotive distributor and had branched into finance. In 1972, Harpers International was sold to Sime Darby Limited for $HK146 million, forming part of China Engineers Limited, which was a publicly traded company that was controlled by Sime Darby.

By late 1974, China Engineers had run into difficulties with Sime Darby asking Wyllie to become chairman and chief executive officer (CEO) of the company. The company quickly returned to profitability in 1975. In 1975, he became the chief executive of Hutchison International one of Hong Kong's biggest companies which had run into financial problems. By 1976, 103 Hutchison subsidiaries had been liquidated or sold. He also acquired a number of key businesses, notably the Hong Kong and Whampoa Dock. By 1977, the new company had become known as Hutchison Whampoa. In 1981, Wyllie stood down as chairman and CEO in favour of Li Ka Shing.

Wyllie worked subsequently in his private company, Asia Securities. In 1982, Wyllie was approached by BSR Limited a British company, to become executive chairman and perform another corporate restructure. After returning the company to profitability, Wyllie stood down as executive chairman in 1982. He was also involved in restructuring the Regal Hotel Group and Paliburg Investments serving as executive chairman between 1984 and 1986, and as an executive director until 1997. In 1991, Wyllie sold his interests in Asia Securities for $HK800 million, and established Wyllie Group Pty Ltd.

== Return to Perth ==
The Wyllie Group focuses on real estate, including the Perth Convention Exhibition Centre which it co-owned.

Wyllie also owned ten per cent of the Burswood Casino before selling his interest to Kerry Packer's Publishing and Broadcasting Limited in 2004.

Wyllie died in 2006, aged 73, after a long fight with cancer. He was survived by his widow, Rhonda, and six children. One of his daughters married former Test cricketer and media personality Brendon Julian. His stepdaughter, Melissa Wyllie, had taken over as CEO of Wyllie Group by the time of his death.

Business positions
Preceded by Sir Douglas Clague	Managing director of Hutchinson Whampoa; 1979–1981	Succeeded by Li Ka-shing
