= Norman Oswald Cyril Marsh =

Norman Oswald Cyril Marsh (27 July 1890 – 7 June 1973) was a British businessman in Ceylon and Hong Kong. He was also member of the Legislative Council of Hong Kong.

He served in the Indian Medical Service during the First World War in the Cavalry Branch and was promoted temporarily to Second Lieutenant in January 1915 and to Lieutenant in January 1916.

He was a partner at the Delmege Forsyth & Co. Ltd. in Ceylon and partner at Mackinnon, Mackenzie & Co. and general manager of P&O in Hong Kong. He was also chairman of the Ceylon Chamber of Commerce. During his spell, he formed the Employers' Federation of Ceylon at a time when the colony was faced with labour troubles, which he brought the experience to Hong Kong to help the Hong Kong General Chamber of Commerce set up the Employers' Federation of Hong Kong there. As vice chairman of the chamber of commerce, he was elected to sit as an unofficial member in the Legislative Council of Hong Kong during the absence of Philip Cassidy in 1948. He was appointed to the Inquiry Commission on the fire of the Wing On Warehouse in Sai Wan.

Marsh was a golf player and member of the Royal Colombo Golf Club. He won the 1932 Captain's Cup.
