= Alex Wu =

Hong Kong businessman and politician

Alex Wu Shu-chih (Chinese: 吳樹熾; 14 September 1920 – 9 January 2005) was a Hong Kong businessman and politician. He was an unofficial member of the Legislative Council of Hong Kong.

== Early life ==
Wu was born to Wu Chao-ming and Yeh Huei-cheng on 14 September 1920. His father was visited by Mao Zedong's revolutionary vanguard during the Autumn Harvest uprising in 1927. He had lived in Kunming, Shanghai and Hong Kong in his childhood. When he studied in Kunming, he was classmate of children of the local warlord. As a government official, his father gave opportunity to Alex to learn six dialects and savour marine science and mechanical engineering, his favourite academic subjects. He studied Engineering at the National Southwest Associated University in Kunming during the war, when he was a convoy officer of strategic goods on the precipitous Burma Road between Kunming and Chungking, the wartime capital of China.

== Business career ==
When the Communists took over China, he fled to Hong Kong and established a printing business which later led his joint venture with the Dai Nippon Printing. He introduced the offset printing and new management model and later became the vice-chairman of the Dai Nippon Printing Company (H.K.) Ltd. In 1982, he introduced the six-colour map printing to replace the old four-colour to China and became more active in promoting Hong Kong printing industry overseas. He helped convene the 3rd Printing Conference in Hong Kong in the 1980s and a large conference in Beijing in 2001. For his contributions, Wu had become the life honorary president of the Hong Kong Printers Associations.

He had also been the chairman of the Fidelity Management Limited, an independent non-executive director of Hong Kong Ferry (Holdings) Company and a non-executive director of a number of listed companies including Hong Kong Aircraft Engineering Company, National Electronics Holdings, Paliburg Holdings, Hung Hing Printing Group, K. Wah International Holdings, Regal Hotels International Holdings. In 2004, he was invited to become a non-executive director of the Henderson Land Development Company.

He was the chairman of the Hong Kong Junior Chamber of Commerce. During his chairmanship, Wu invited Harvard professors to seminar series modelled after the Harvard Business School. Wu had also been appointed by the government vice-chairman of the Hong Kong Stock Exchange and a member of the Advisory Committee of the Securities and Futures Commission when the council was reorganised in the 1980s.

== Public career ==
He was also heavily involved in the public services. From 1973 to 1976, he was an appointed member of the Urban Council. He introduced the concept of the Hospital Authority and the need for an International Exhibition Centre modelled after the Dallas Trade Mart in Texas to the Legislative Council. In 1973, he was awarded Officer of the Order of the British Empire (OBE) for his community services in Hong Kong. He had by then sat on major public bodies, including the Hong Kong Trade Development Council and the Social Welfare Advisory Committee.

In the 1970s, Wu was invited by then Governor Sir Murray MacLehose to lunch to discuss cultural scene, only for Wu to discover later that he was being auditioned by the Colonial Secretary on suitability for membership of Legislative Council. He became an unofficial member of the Legislative Council in 1975, in which he served until 1988. He was also a member of the Universities and Polytechnic Grants Committee, deputy chairman of the Vocational Training Council. For his contributions, Wu was made Commander of the Most Excellent Order of the British Empire (CBE) in 1983 and received a Doctor of Laws honorary degree by the University of Hong Kong in 1992.

He was praised by the then Governor Sir Edward Youde for his promotion of the arts and the Chinese Languages to Hong Kong, for his efforts in establishing the Hong Kong Academy for the Performing Arts. He was also the chairman of the Hong Kong Philharmonic Society from 1973 to 76. In 1983, he was the chairman of the working party on the development of a Chinese language foundation, in which he made recommendations of raising the standard of Chinese language amounts in school, including funding provisions; policies on the publication of Chinese textbooks and the wider use of Putonghua in public meetings.

In April 1995, he was appointed by the Beijing government a Hong Kong Affairs Advisers and in November a member of the Selection Committee for the First Government of the Hong Kong Special Administrative Region, which was responsible to elect the first Chief Executive, Tung Chee-hwa.

Wu died on 9 January 2005 at the age of 84.
