= James Dickson Leach =

James Dickson Leach, OBE, JP (19 July 1912 – 23 February 1992) was a British businessman in Hong Kong. He was an unofficial member of the Legislative Council of Hong Kong in the 1960s.

Leach was born in Newcastle upon Tyne in July 1912. He was an associate of the Chartered Insurance Institute and worked with the Union Insurance Society of Canton and became the director and general manager of the company in 1959 after L. B. Stone retired from the office. He also served at the Hongkong Electric Company among other companies. He was elected chair of the Hong Kong General Chamber of Commerce in 1967. He had served unofficial member of the Legislative Council of Hong Kong for several occasions in the 1960s as the chamber representative during the absence of W. C. G. Knowles and G. R. Ross. He succeeded S. S. Gordon on 1 July 1966 and continued to serve on the council until his retirement in May 1968. He was also president of the Insurance Institute of Hong Kong. He died in Hawick, Roxburghshire, Scotland in February 1992.

Business positions
Preceded by G. R. Ross	Chairman of the Hong Kong General Chamber of Commerce; 1967–1968	Succeeded by M. A. R. Herries
