= Tse Yu-chuen =

Tse Yu-chuen, OBE, JP (Chinese: 謝雨川; 1899 – 18 May 1976) was a Hong Kong businessman and an unofficial member of the Legislative Council of Hong Kong.

Tse was born in Panyu, Guangzhou in 1899 and was educated at the St Joseph's College, Hong Kong, in 1910 and was later transferred to St. Paul's College, Hong Kong. After his graduation, he became a businessman and the joined C. Melchers GmbH & Co. in 1925 and became its manager in 1935. After the Pacific War, he was appointed by the government officer of rationing the rice.

Tse had been core member and vice-chairman of the Chinese General Chamber of Commerce. In 1952, he ran against the pro-Communist Ko Chuk-hung as Ko was becoming increasingly pro-Beijing, but he and the anti-Ko faction were defeated. He was also chairman of the South China Athletic Association and the Hong Kong Chinese Swimming Association. He also chaired the Sugar Merchants Association of Hong Kong, the Rotary Club of Hong Kong Island West, the Scout Association of Victoria City District, the Pun U District Association of Hong Kong and the St. Paul's College Alumni Association and was vice-chairman of the Comprador's Association.

He received the Queen Elizabeth II Coronation Medal in 1953 and was made Justice of the Peace in 1958. In 1964, he was appointed by the government to the Legislative Council of Hong Kong as an unofficial member. He was also awarded the Officer of the Order of the British Empire (OBE) for his public services in Hong Kong.

Tse died on 18 May 1976 at the Queen Mary Hospital, aged 77, and was buried at the Catholic Cemetery in Happy Valley, Hong Kong.
