= Andrew So =

Hong Kong educator and politician (born 1939)

Andrew So SBS, OBE, JP
- 蘇國榮
- Born: March 29, 1939 (age 87)
- Education: Wah Yan College, Kowloon; Grantham College of Education
- Occupations: Educator, politician

Andrew So Kwok-wing, SBS, OBE, JP (Chinese: 蘇國榮; born 29 March 1939) is a Hong Kong educator and politician.

So was born on 29 March 1939. He studied at the Wah Yan College, Kowloon and the Grantham College of Education and worked as an educator. He took an active role in the credit union movement since 1963 and was the founding president of the Association of Asian Confederation of Credit Unions in 1971. he was also managing director of the Credit Union League of Hong Kong and director of the CUNA International/ World Council of Credit Unions from 1969 to 1981. He had also served as International vice president for Asia and Africa with CUNA Mutual Group from 1974 to 1994. At the time he was the chairman of the Justice and Peace Commission of the Hong Kong Catholic Diocese.

He was made Justice of the Peace in 1980. From 1978 to 1985, he was the unofficial member of the Legislative Council of Hong Kong by Governor Sir Murray MacLehose. He and another member of Legislative Council Rev. Patrick Terence McGovern who appointed around the same time, were generally recognised as unofficial spokesmen for the workers and the underdogs of Hong Kong. He was also member of the Standing Commission on Civil Service Salaries and Conditions of Service and Education Commission. In 1983, he was awarded Officer of the Order of the British Empire (OBE) for his services in Hong Kong.

In 1994, he was made the Commissioner for Administrative Complaints, the ombudsman of Hong Kong, to succeed Arthur Garcia, by Governor Chris Patten. He held the position until April 1999 when Chief Executive Tung Chee-hwa replaced him with a civil servant Alice Tai Yuen-ying. During his spell, So aggressively took government departments to task, finding their faults and exposing their problems through mass media. For his public services, he was awarded the Silver Bauhinia Star Award (SBS) in 1999.
