= Patrick Terence McGovern =

Rev. Patrick Terence McGovern, SJ (Chinese: 孟家華神父; 28 October 1920 – 30 September 1984) was an Irish Catholic priest and unofficial member of the Legislative Council of Hong Kong.

== Biography ==
McGovern was born in Dublin, Ireland on 28 October 1920. He became a priest after he graduated from the secondary school. At the beginning he still enjoyed the freedoms and was not restrained with noviceship and scholastic life. On 7 September 1938, he entered the Irish Jesuit novitiate.

He first arrived in Hong Kong in 1947 and was in North America for studying social studies for a period of time. He was ordained priest in Ireland on 31 July 1953 and returned to Hong Kong in 1955. For the following decade, he devoted himself into school work, with a few years of pastoral work and army chaplaincy in Malaysia. He worked for various voluntary agencies and in 1965 he became director of the Caritas Social Centre, Kennedy Town.

In 1968, he co-founded the Industrial Relations Institute with a group of workers to train workers “for participation in free, strong responsible trade unionism” and became the first director for a short period of time. At the time he had also become a regular broadcaster of five-minute social comments on Radio Hong Kong.

For his social service, he was appointed to the Legislative Council of Hong Kong by Sir Murray MacLehose, then Governor of Hong Kong. He was known to arrive on a motor bicycle for his first attendance as a Legislative Councillor. He and another member of Legislative Council Andrew So Kwok-wing who appointed around the same time, were generally recognised as unofficial spokesmen for the workers and the underdogs of Hong Kong. During his office in the Legislative Council, McGovern also led the opposition to the amendment of the Abortion Bill. He was also one of the attendants upon the initialing of the Sino-British Declaration.

McGovern died suddenly after a heart attack in Wah Yan College, Hong Kong, in the morning of Sunday, 30 September 1984, aged 64.
