= Jimmy McGregor =

Hong Kong businessman and politician/member of the McGregor family (1924-2014)

Sir Jimmy McGregor OBE, ISO, JP
- James McGregor in 1976

Non-Official Member of the Executive Council
- In office October 1995 – 30 June 1997
- Appointed by: Chris Patten
- Preceded by: Dame Lydia Dunn

Member of the Legislative Council
- In office 12 October 1988 – 31 July 1995
- Preceded by: Thomas Clydesdale
- Succeeded by: Paul Cheng
- Constituency: Commercial

Personal details
- Born: 30 January 1924 Edinburgh, Scotland
- Died: 14 July 2014 (aged 90) Vancouver, British Columbia, Canada
- Party: Hong Kong Democratic Foundation
- Spouse: Christine Kwai-cheung McGregor
- Children: 3
- Education: Dux Boy Aberhill H.G. School
- Occupation: Businessman and civil servant

Sir James David McGregor OBE ISO JP (30 January 1924 – 14 July 2014) was a Hong Kong colonial government official and a member of the Legislative Council of Hong Kong for the Commercial (First) functional constituency from 1988 to 1995 and non-official member of the Executive Council of Hong Kong from 1995 to 1997. He was also the long-time director of the Hong Kong General Chamber of Commerce.

== Early life, civil service and business career ==
McGregor was born in Edinburgh, Scotland on 30 January 1924 and was educated at the Dux Boy Aberhill H.G. School. He arrived in Hong Kong as a non-commissioned officer with the Royal Air Force in 1951 and in early 1954 joined the Commerce and Industry Department of the colonial government as an executive officer and was later promoted to administrative officer.

He was the Assistant Director of the Commerce and Industry Department during the Hong Kong 1967 Leftist Riots and was involved in the anti-propaganda "war room" under Jack Cater against the rioters. For his contribution, he was made Companion of the Imperial Service Order in 1971. He worked for the Commerce and Industry Department for 22 years before he left the government in 1973. After leaving the civil service, he was awarded the Officer of the Order of the British Empire in 1976.

After departing from the civil service, he was the director of the Hong Kong General Chamber of Commerce in which he held the position from 1975 to 1988. Under his leadership, the chamber acquired the current office at the United Centre in Admiralty, Hong Kong. He was also the vice-chairman of the Hongkong Chinese Bank.

== Political career ==
In the 1988 Legislative Council election, the second indirect election to the Legislative Council of Hong Kong, McGregor ran in the chamber's Commercial (First) functional constituency as a liberal candidate in the chamber for the greater democratisation against Veronica Wu who was supported by the conservative lobby Group of 88. After defeating Wu by 478 to 236 votes, he claimed "this is a victory for greater democracy."

In May 1989, he founded the Hong Kong Democratic Foundation (HKDF) with legislator Dr. Leong Che-hung of the Medical constituency. He was re-elected in the 1991 Legislative Council election against Paul Cheng, with 487 to 416 votes. In the 1994 Hong Kong electoral reform voting, he supported Governor Chris Patten's reform proposals and independent democrat Emily Lau's motion for fully direct elected legislature in 1995.

As the Sino-British relations became tense due to the reform proposals, McGregor received a humiliating defeat in a general committee election of the General Chamber of Commerce in 1994, receiving 543 out of about 2,000 votes and was excluded from the general committee for the first time since 1989. He attributed his defeat to the fact that the chamber was heading in a more pro-China direction. He was also forced to resign as a director of the Hongkong Chinese Bank (HKCB) because of his pro-democracy beliefs in 1993. He stepped down from the Legislative Council in September 1995.

In October 1995, McGregor was appointed to Governor Chris Patten's Executive Council to succeed retiring Senior Member Dame Lydia Dunn, but he stayed with the HKDF as a senior member and mentor until his retirement to Canada in 1997. On the eve of the end of the colonial rule, he was knighted in June 1997 along with Donald Tsang, the then Financial Secretary who later became the 2nd Chief Executive.

== Retirement and death ==
He married Christine Kwai-cheung McGregor and had two children. McGregor retired in Vancouver and was fond of golfing and gardening; he continued to keep track on current affairs in Hong Kong. He had difficulty walking in his later life. He died aged 90 on 14 July 2014.

Legislative Council of Hong Kong
Preceded by Thomas Clydesdale	Member of the Legislative Council; Representative for Commercial; 1988–1995	Succeeded by Paul Cheng
Political offices
Preceded by Dame Lydia Dunn	Member of the Executive Council; 1995–1997	End of colonial rule
