= Maurice Murray Watson =

British solicitor in Hong Kong

M. M. Watson

Unofficial Member of the Legislative Council of Hong Kong
- In office 24 October 1946 – 18 March 1953
- Appointed by: Mark Young; Alexander Grantham
- Preceded by: New seat
- Succeeded by: Dhun J. Ruttonjee

Personal details
- Born: 29 December 1893 St. Pancras, London, England
- Died: 8 June 1973 (aged 79) Eastbourne, Sussex, England
- Occupation: Solicitor; Businessman

Maurice Murray Watson (29 December 1893 – 8 June 1973) was a British solicitor in Hong Kong and unofficial member of the Legislative Council of Hong Kong.

== Biography ==
Watson worked as an articled clerk from November 1910 to A. Home, of 55 Gracechurch Street, London and served in his office for four years. When the First World War broke out, he joined as private of the Inns of Court Officers' Training Corps on 8 November 1914 and later became the 2nd Lieutenant of the 11th Battalion of the South Staffordshire Regiment. After he was demobilised in 1919, he was admitted a solicitor in England in 1919 when he complied all the requirements but had not given four months' notice to the Registrar of the Law Society. The Law Society wrote to say they did not object to the application.

Watson later moved to Hong Kong to practice as a solicitor of the Criminal Sessions Court by the acting Chief Justice H. H. J. Gompertz on 27 January 1921. He worked for the firm Johnson, Stokes and Master. He was also head of many public companies, such as the chairman of the Thomson & Co. Chartered Accountants, director of the Broadcast Relay Service (Hong Kong) Limited and the co-founder of the Swire Pacific Limited when it was incorporated in 1940. He also held many public offices such as secretary of the Dental Board and member of the Medical Board. He was also member of the Hong Kong General Chamber of Commerce.

In 1946, Watson was elected as the representative of the Unofficial Justices of the Peace to the Legislative Council of Hong Kong. During his office as an unofficial member of the Legislative Council, he voted for the Inland Revenue Bill 1947 which was heavily being criticised by the unofficials who opposed to income tax. He also agreed on the Governor Alexander Grantham's modification on the Young Plan which abandoned the possibility of a municipal council but introducing elections into the Legislative Council, arguing that a municipal council should emerge by evolution.

He resigned and succeeded by Dhun J. Ruttonjee on 20 March 1953.

Legislative Council of Hong Kong
Preceded by H. E. Pollock	Unofficial Member; Representative for Justices of the Peace; 1946–1953	Succeeded by Dhun J. Ruttonjee
