= Cedric Blaker =

British entrepreneur (1889–1965)

Cedric Blaker CBE, MC, ED, JP

Unofficial Member of the Executive Council of Hong Kong
- In office 1954–1955
- Appointed by: Sir Alexander Grantham

Unofficial Member of the Legislative Council of Hong Kong
- In office 27 April 1949 – 6 March 1958
- Appointed by: Sir Alexander Grantham
- Preceded by: P. S. Cassidy
- Succeeded by: J. D. Clague

Personal details
- Born: 19 November 1889 West Sussex, England
- Died: 18 June 1965 (aged 75) East Sussex, England
- Spouse: Louise Chapple (m. 1921)
- Children: Peter Allan Renshaw; Derek John Renshaw
- Occupation: Businessman

Cedric Blaker CBE MC ED JP (19 November 1889 – 18 June 1965) was a British entrepreneur in China and Hong Kong. He was the chairman of the Hongkong and Shanghai Banking Corporation, the South China Morning Post and the Hong Kong Chamber of Commerce and also an unofficial member of the Executive Council and the Legislative Council of Hong Kong.

His son, Baron Blaker, was a Conservative minister.

== Biography ==
Blaker was born in West Sussex, England, on 19 November 1889 to the Reverend Cecil Renshaw Blaker and Annie Kirtley Blaker. His father was the first priest at Turners Hill from 1877 to 1914. He had a brother called Brian Oscar Blaker.

He first went to China in 1911 to work for Butterfield and Swire, resigning in 1915 to join the armed forces. He served as a lieutenant in the Royal Sussex Regiment in France from 1916 to 1919 during the First World War and was awarded the Military Cross. After the war, he returned to China and joined the Gilman & Co., a trading firm in China and became its director. He was interned during the Japanese occupation of Hong Kong and survived the war.

After the war, he remained active in the public life. In 1949, he was first appointed unofficial member of the Legislative Council of Hong Kong as a representative of the Hong Kong General Chamber of Commerce during the absence of P. S. Cassidy. He replaced H. J. Collar to be elected to the Legislative Council in 1953 in which he served until 1958.

Between 1953 and 58, he was the chairman of the Hongkong and Shanghai Banking Corporation, one of the leading financial institutions of the world. In 1953 and from 1956 to 57, he was the chairman of the Hong Kong General Chamber of Commerce. He was also chairman of the South China Morning Post, one of the major English newspapers in Hong Kong.

He was Honorary Vice-Consul and Consul-General for Sweden at Hong Kong and was awarded Insignia of Chevalier (First Class) and Insignia of Commander of the Order of Vasa for his service in 1940 and 1955 respectively. He also appointed Honorary Consul for Greece at Hong Kong in 1946. In 1958, he was awarded Commander of the Order of the British Empire (CBE) for his public services in Hong Kong.

Blaker married Louise Chapple, a New Zealander on 30 June 1921 at the Church of St Margaret's, Westminster Abbey, in London. The couple had two sons, Peter Allan Renshaw Blaker and Derek John Renshaw. Peter, who was born in Hong Kong who would later become a Minister of State for the Ministry of Defence under Prime Minister Margaret Thatcher from 1981 to 1983.

He lived in Scaynes Hill, Sussex, England, in his later life and died on 18 June 1965, aged 75.

Business positions
Preceded by Arthur Morse	Chairman of the Hongkong and Shanghai Banking Corporation; 1953–1958	Succeeded by Michael Turner
Preceded by H. J. Collar	Chairman of the Hong Kong General Chamber of Commerce; 1953	Succeeded by J. A. Blackwood
Preceded by J. A. Blackwood	Chairman of the Hong Kong General Chamber of Commerce; 1956–1957	Succeeded by J. D. Clague
Legislative Council of Hong Kong
Preceded by P. S. Cassidy	Unofficial Member; Representative for Hong Kong General Chamber of Commerce; 1949–1958	Succeeded by J. D. Clague
Diplomatic posts
Preceded by Geoffrey Miskin	Honorary Consul of Sweden to Hong Kong; 1947–1954	Succeeded by Torsten Brandel as Consul
