= Kenneth Albert Watson =

Kenneth Albert Watson OBE
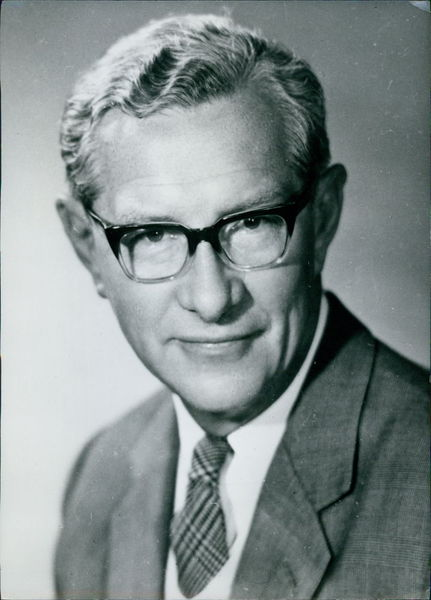
- Watson in 1962
- Born: July 30, 1912; Singapore
- Died: May 3, 1999 (aged 86); Shaftesbury, Dorset, United Kingdom
- Occupation: Businessman
- Known for: Unofficial member of the Legislative Council of Hong Kong

Kenneth Albert Watson, OBE, JP (30 July 1912 – 3 May 1999) was a British businessman in Hong Kong. He was an unofficial member of the Legislative Council of Hong Kong.

== Early years ==
Watson was born in Singapore in July 1912. In the 1930s and 1940s on the eve of Japanese invasion of Hong Kong, he served in the Hong Kong Naval Volunteer Force.

== Career ==
Watson became a businessman and the owner of Lammert Brothers Auctioneers Ltd. (which operated out of the Pedder Building in Central post-World War Two). From 1964 to 1970, Watson was an unofficial member of the Legislative Council.

He provoked the public on the issue of raising telephone fees in 1964 by saying that telephone service in Hong Kong was one of the cheapest in the world. Watson was a director of the Hong Kong Telephone Company with two Legislative Council members Kan Yuet-keung and Kwan Cho-yiu who also served at the Hong Kong Telephone.

From July to September 1968, he was provisionally appointed to the Executive Council during the absence of J. A. Saunders.

== Recognition and death ==
In 1964, he was awarded Officer of the Order of the British Empire (OBE) for his public services in Hong Kong. He died in Shaftesbury, Dorset, England in May 1999 at the age of 86.
