= George MacDonald Goldsack =

G. M. Goldsack

George McDonald Goldsack (18 September 1902 – 16 August 1969) was a British businessman in China and Hong Kong. He was an unofficial member of the Legislative Council of Hong Kong from 1960 to 1961.

Goldsack was born on 18 September 1902 on 5 Nightingdale Road, Dover, England. He married Charlotte Mernetta Richards (1908–1997) and moved to Shanghai, China for worked for the Dodwell & Co., one of the leading British trading firms in China at that time. During the Second World War they were imprisoned for four years. He was the chairman of the Hong Kong General Chamber of Commerce and the chamber representative in the Legislative Council of Hong Kong from 1960 to 61 until he retired in 1961 and returned to Dover. He died on 16 August 1969 in Benenden, Kent, England.

Business positions
Preceded by J. D. Clague	Chairman of the Hong Kong General Chamber of Commerce; 1960	Succeeded by W. C. G. Knowles
Legislative Council of Hong Kong
Preceded by J. D. Clague	Unofficial Member; Representative for Hong Kong General Chamber of Commerce; 1960–1961	Succeeded by W. C. G. Knowles
