= Peter Gordon Williams =

British businessman (1920–1982)

Peter Gordon Williams, OBE, JP (23 January 1920 – 14 October 1982) was a British businessman and an unofficial member of the Legislative Council of Hong Kong.

Williams was a fencer and a cricket player. He was an artillery officer in the British Indian Army during the Second World War. After the war, he met and married Anne Newmarch of Guy Newmarch, a railway engineer in North China, and Catherine Muir, in London. The couple had two sons, Adam and Piers. Through Anne's connections, Peter Williams got a job with the Dodwell & Co, a Far East trading company in Hong Kong.

He became the director and later the chairman of the company. He was also the chairman of the Inchcape after it purchased the Dodwell for £13 million in 1973. He was also chairman of the Hongkong Electric Company and non-executive director of the Hongkong and Shanghai Banking Corporation, The Hongkong & Kowloon Wharf & Godown Company Limited and The Hong Kong Telephone Company. He succeeded Sir Douglas Clague in 1975 as the deputy chairman of the bank. In 1972, he became chairman of the Hong Kong General Chamber of Commerce, As a chamber representative, he was an unofficial member of the Legislative Council of Hong Kong from 1972 to 1978. He was also a provisional member of the Executive Council of Hong Kong during the absence of Sir Douglas Clague.

He was also a steward and later chairman of the Royal Hong Kong Jockey Club. Under his spell, the Sha Tin Racecourse was opened in 1978. He also greeted Queen Elizabeth II during her visit in Hong Kong in 1975. Williams and his family lived at 35 Magazine Gap Road of The Peak.

He resigned as chairman of the Royal Hong Kong Jockey Club in 1981 and retired as the director on 31 May 1982. Shortly after he returned to England, Williams died in London at 9:30 am on 14 October 1982, aged 62.

Business positions
Preceded by G. M. B. Salmon	Chairman of the Hong Kong General Chamber of Commerce; 1972–1973	Succeeded by Peter Foxon
Legislative Council of Hong Kong
Preceded by G. M. B. Salmon	Unofficial Member; Representative for Hong Kong General Chamber of Commerce; 1972–1978	Succeeded by Sidney Gordon
Sporting positions
Preceded by Sir Douglas Clague	Chairman of the Royal Hong Kong Jockey Club; 1974–1981	Succeeded by Sir Michael Sandberg
