= George Ronald Ross =

British businessman

George Ronald Ross CBE, JP
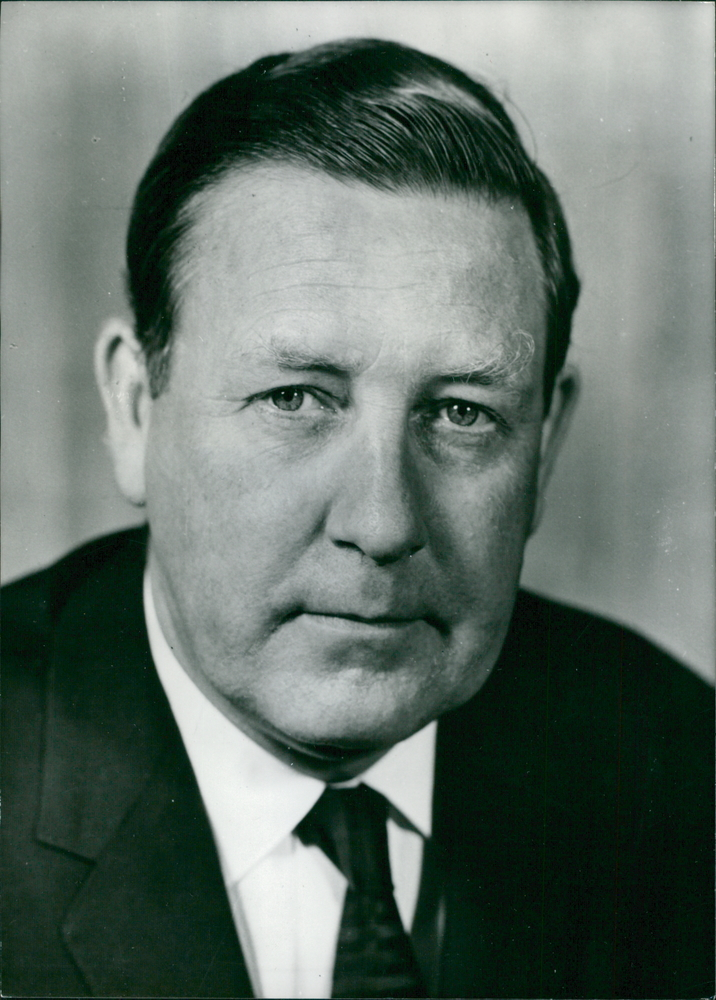

Unofficial Member of the Legislative Council
- In office 1964–1968
- Preceded by: W. C. G. Knowles
- Succeeded by: M. A. R. Herries

Personal details
- Born: 22 July 1914
- Died: 10 March 2008 (aged 93)
- Children: Frances; Graham; Sandie

George Ronald Ross CBE JP (22 July 1914 – 10 March 2008) was a British businessman in Hong Kong. He was chairman of the Hong Kong General Chamber of Commerce and chairman of the Standing Committee on Directorate Salaries (for the Hong Kong Government) for so long it became known as the "Ross Committee". He was also a member of the Executive Council and the Legislative Council of Hong Kong and a taipan of Deacon & Co, a well known trading company.

== Early life ==
Ross was born in July 1914. After studying in Belfast he sailed out to Shanghai to join his parents in 1933. His first job was for the Danish firm of East Asiatic where he learnt about shipping. He next went to work for accountants, Lowe Bingham and Matthews, before eventually working for Deacon & Co in Shameen and later Hong Kong. It was at this time while playing golf at the Tungshan Golf Club that he met his future wife, Rae Stratton, the daughter of William Murray Stratton, who was Engineer-in-chief for the Canton-Kowloon Railway. The two married at St Andrew's Church in Kowloon in November 1938.

== Second World War ==
Upon arrival in Hong Kong, Ross volunteered with the Hong Kong Volunteer Defense Corps (HKVDC). Training included donning a uniform for one weekend a month and an annual 10-day camp during which Ross exercised with two six-inch guns taken from the World War 1 Cruiser, HMS Kent. On 7 December 1941, Ross received orders to report for duty and was assigned as a gunner to 2nd Battery at Bluff Head, Stanley. His wife Rae volunteered as a nurse and served at the Bowen Road Military Hospital. By 19 December, Japanese troops were advancing from the north and 1st Battery, positioned at Cape D'Aguilar were ordered to destroy its guns and evacuate to Stanley Village. Ross had volunteered his car, a Morris 8 to the war effort and under the orders of Captain Douglas Crozier drove munitions and troops (many hanging to the outside of the vehicle) from Cape D'Aguilar to Stanley Village, the position of the last stand of the Battle of Hong Kong. Hong Kong surrendered to Japan on Christmas Day 1941. Ross was originally imprisoned at North Point, then marched to Sham Shui Po Barracks and finally shipped to Innoshima, where he worked at Habu Dockyard for Osaka Ironworks. Ross worked on a plate-laying gang for three years before being liberated and shipped to Hearne Bay, Australia. On receiving a telegram from Ross, Rae (who had been imprisoned in Stanley Village) came to Australia and in 1946 the two returned to Hong Kong.

== Kowloon Hills Murder ==
On 11 February 1948, Ross and Lytton Bevis Wood went on a hike in the Kowloon Hills. As they walked up a path near Lion Rock the two were attacked by four men. They were beaten and tied and at one point Ross had a revolver pointed at him which fortunately misfired. Ross was thrown into a bush while Wood was thrown headfirst into a stream. Upon regaining consciousness Ross managed to free his legs and pull Wood from the stream before running for help. When police and ambulance men arrived Wood had already died. The property taken from Ross and Wood consisted of two wristwatches, an Orlik pipe, a tin of tobacco, a pair of horn-rimmed spectacles and 27 dollars in cash. The police offered a 5000 dollar reward for any information that may lead to an arrest but no arrests were ever made.

== Career and personal life ==
Ross worked for Deacon and Co, eventually becoming taipan in 1948. He also held a number of directorate posts including chairman of the Hongkong Telephone Co, board member of China Light & Power Co, board member of the Union Insurance Society of Canton and board member of the Hongkong and Shanghai Bank for twelve years. In the public sphere, he was a member of Hong Kong's Executive Council and Legislative Council, as well as chairman of the Hong Kong Chamber of Commerce and chairman of the Standing Committee on Directorate Salaries. He also became associated with such bodies as the Export Credit Insurance Corporation, the Trade Development Council, the Textiles Advisory Board, the Trade and Industry Advisory Board, the Port Executive Committee, the Federation of Hong Kong Industries, the Hong Kong Tourist Association, the Tenancy Tribunal and the Board of Review of the Inland Revenue Department. Ross was heavily involved in the community, acting as President of the Scouts Association of Hong Kong and Vice-President of Outward Bound since its inception in the sixties. In a more social capacity, he was chairman of the Hong Kong Club in 1962 and Chieftain of the St Andrew's Society in 1969.

In 1968 for his services in Hong Kong he was awarded by the Queen with the award of Officer of the Order of the British Empire (OBE). In 1973 in the 1973 Birthday Honours he was awarded the honour of Commander of the Order of the British Empire (CBE).

Ross had three children, Frances Gouldsbury (née Ross), Graham Ross and Sandie Concha (née Ross). He died in March 2008 at the age of 93.

Business positions
Preceded by Sidney Samuel Gordon	Chairman of the Hong Kong General Chamber of Commerce; 1963–1964	Succeeded by J. Dickson Leach
Legislative Council of Hong Kong
Preceded by W. C. G. Knowles	Unofficial Member; Representative for Hong Kong General Chamber of Commerce; 1964–1968	Succeeded by M. A. R. Herries
