= John Arthur Blackwood =

John Arthur Blackwood (3 November 1904 – 6 August 1973) was a British Hong Kong businessman. He was the taipan of Butterfield & Swire and chairman of Cathay Pacific Airways. Between 1954 and 1955, he was the chairman of the Hong Kong General Chamber of Commerce, replacing Cedric Blaker. He represented the Chamber of Commerce as an Unofficial member of the Legislative Council of Hong Kong from 1954 to 1955. In the Legislative Council, he strongly opposed the introduction of section 27 to the Inland Revenue Ordinance, which allowed the government (in case of doubt as to the provenance of a profit) to consider lack of overseas taxation as evidence that the profit in question arose in Hong Kong, thus becoming liable to taxation in Hong Kong. The section was repealed 27 years later as misconceived.

Business positions
Preceded by Cedric Blaker	Chairman of the Hong Kong General Chamber of Commerce; 1960	Succeeded by Cedric Blaker
