= Deacons (law firm) =

Hong Kong–based law firm

Deacons 的近律師行
- Headquarters: Hong Kong
- No. of offices: 4 internationally
- No. of attorneys: 300
- No. of employees: 700
- Major practice areas: Full service
- Key people: Lilian Chiang (Senior Partner)
- Date founded: 1851; 175 years ago
- Founder: William Bridges
- Company type: Partnership
- Website: www.deacons.com.hk

Deacons (Chinese: 的近律師行) is a leading law firm in Hong Kong with over 300 attorneys and 700 employees.

Founded in 1851, it provides full service for all major practice areas such as corporate mergers & acquisitions, regulatory compliance, intellectual properties, insurance, international arbitration and litigation. It serves a long list of private clients and high-profile conglomerates, including Google, McDonald's Corp, Samsung, Alibaba Group, JP Morgan Asset Management, Shangri-La Hotels & Resorts, Yahoo Inc!, and the HKSAR Government.

The law firm is currently based in Hong Kong, with additional offices in Beijing, Guangzhou, and Shanghai. It is the longest established and largest law firm in Hong Kong, and has experienced practitioners for every level of the court system.

It also maintains connections with other large, independent law firms around the world to deal with multi-jurisdictional disputes. It is the only member firm of Lex Mundi in Hong Kong.

== History ==
The firm is named for the English solicitor Victor Deacon, who in 1880 joined the legal practice established by William Thomas Bridges in 1851 in Hong Kong. Bridges was the second barrister to commence practice in Hong Kong.

Within two years, Victor Deacon was made a partner and within 20 years, under his own name, he had firmly established Deacons as one of the colony's leading law firms, a position it has retained to this day. In 1860, with offices on Queen's Road, the firm was based close to the Supreme Court. In 1910, the larger firm required bigger office space and Deacons moved to Ice House Street.

Deacons grew steadily throughout the 20th century, flourishing during Hong Kong's post-war boom. By the mid-1970s, Deacons was a busy, full-service business law firm and a highly respected name in commercial circles throughout Asia.

Since 1985, it has resided in Alexandra House, Central, progressively taking more floor space to accommodate the expanding team of lawyers. Its headquarters is equipped with internal staircases alongside two private elevators, spanning 6 individual floors. It also operates an office location in Sheung Wan.

Deacons formed a strategic alliance with Graham & James, operating in Asia under the collective name "Deacons Graham & James". The alliance dissolved in June 2000, with Deacons backing out due to Graham & James's failure to commit resources to Asia and dwindling position in US law firm rankings.

In 1986, Deacons opened an initial presence in the People's Republic of China in Beijing. Deacons subsequently established representative offices in Guangzhou and Shanghai in 1994 and 1999 respectively. In 2002, Deacons established a representative office in Beijing and was one of the first Hong Kong law firms to be granted a licence to open a second office in mainland China. Deacons was also the first Hong Kong firm to be awarded a third foreign law firm license in mainland China.

== Practice Areas ==
Deacons is listed in The Legal 500 and Chambers and Partners. It is a globally ranked, first-tier law firm offering legal services for 15 key service areas, as well as additional specializations within each:

- Banking & Finance
- Capital Markets
- China Trade & Investment
- Construction
- Corporate and M&A
- Employment & Pensions
- Insolvency & Restructuring
- Insurance
- Intellectual Property
- Investment Funds
- Litigation & Dispute Resolution
- Private Clients
- Real Estate
- Regulatory
- Tax

== Recognition ==
Deacons has been highly acclaimed for its service, corporate social responsibility (CSR), employee benefits, working environment and graduate recruitment over decades. A selection of the recent three years' awards includes:-

=== 2017 ===
- IFLR "Private Equity Deal of the Year 2017"
- IFLR "Hong Kong Firm of the Year 2017"
- Managing IP "Hong Kong Firm of the Year 2017"
- Chinese Business Law Awards "Construction & Infrastructure Firm of the Year 2017"
- Chinese Business Law Awards "Hong Kong Firm of the Year 2017"
- The Asia Legal Award "M&A Deal of the Year: Private Equity & Venture Capital 2017"
- Human Resources Asia "Best Graduate Recruitment Programme 2017"

=== 2016 ===
- Chambers Asia-Pacific "Hong Kong Law Firm of the Year 2016”
- ASIAN MENA "Firm of the Year 2016"
- IFLR "Hong Kong Firm of the Year 2016"
- Euromoney Asia "Best National Firm for Talent Management 2016"
- Asian Legal Business "Employer of Choice 2016”
- Asian Legal Business "Annual CSR List Awardee 2016"
- HFM Asia Hedge Fund Services Award "Best Onshore Law Firm 2016"

=== 2015 ===
- Chambers Asia-Pacific "Hong Kong Law Firm of the Year 2015”
- China Law & Practice's "Hong Kong Firm of the Year 2015”
- ASIAN MENA Counsel "Most Responsive Domestic Law Firm of the Year 2015"
- IFLR "Hong Kong Firm of the Year 2015"
- Asian Legal Business "Employer of Choice 2015”
- Asian Legal Business "Citizenship Law Firm of the Year 2015"
- The Asian Lawyer
