= James Wu Man-hon =

James Wu Man-hon OBE, JP (Chinese: 胡文瀚; 18 November 1920 – 23 February 2006) was a Hong Kong businessman and an unofficial member of the Legislative Council of Hong Kong.

== Biography ==
Wu was born in 1920 in Pokfulam to Wu Chung, a leading merchant in Hong Kong and founder of the Weatherite Industries, often nicknamed "King of Taxi". His brother, Gordon Wu, was also a prominent real estate developer. Wu was educated at the Dunmei School, a famous Chinese school in Hong Kong, and subsequently at the King's College, Hong Kong. He studied at the University of Hong Kong before the Japanese invasion. He went on to finish his study at the National Sun Yat-sen University with a degree in engineering.

He helped his father to reestablish the family business after the war, opening hotels, studios, theatres, real estates and air conditioners. He was the chairman of the Hopewell Holdings and the Saiweite Industrial Company. Under his Hopewell chairmanship, the company expanded its infrastructural business in South China, Thailand and the Philippines.

He had been president of the Rotary Club of Hong Kong Island East and the chancellor of the Po Leung Kuk. He was also the vice-president of the Chinese Manufacturers' Association of Hong Kong and the chairman of the Federation of Hong Kong Industries. He had led of the Hong Kong delegation to the conferences of the UN Economic Commission for Asia and the Far East on five occasions. He was also the chairman of the Industrial Development Committee of the Hong Kong-Japan Business Co-operation Committee, in which he attracted massive Japanese participation in technology transfer in the field of high-precision tooling for electronics components. He was recognised by receiving permanent membership of the American Society of Heating, Refrigerating and Air Conditioning Engineers (ASHRAE) in 1987.

He had been appointed to many public positions, including the Hong Kong Trade Development Council, the Vocational Training Council and the Hong Kong Productivity Council. He was first appointed to the Urban Council in 1968 and then the Legislative Council in 1972. He was vocal on providing the requisite infrastructural support for the development of vast industrial estates. He was awarded Officer of the Order of the British Empire (OBE) for his public services in 1974.

He was also deputy chairman of the Hong Kong Polytechnic before it was promoted to university. For his contributions, the Hong Kong Polytechnic conferred on him an honorary doctorate in Engineering in 1991. in 1992, he was awarded degree of Doctor of Laws by the University of Hong Kong. He also became honorary citizen of Guangzhou in 1991.
