= Hugh Barton =

Hong Kong politician

Hugh David MacEwen Barton, CBE (17 January 1911 – 16 April 1989) was a British Hong Kong businessman who served as chairman and managing director of Jardine Matheson from 1953 to 1963.

== Biography ==
Barton was born on 17 January 1911 in Ireland. After graduating from Trinity College, Cambridge, Barton joined Jardine Matheson in 1933 as a tea taster and climbing the ranks to become Tai-pan in 1953 at just 42 years old. Barton was assigned to several key areas throughout Asia spending most of his time in Shanghai before returning to Hong Kong in 1949 when the group's assets fell under the new Communist regime. Barton served with the Irish Guards and fought in World War II. He retired from the military in 1944 as a Lt. Colonel and returned to work for Jardine Matheson after the war.

A persistent and flamboyant character, he was appointed Taipan of Jardines, replacing Sir John Keswick. During his tenure, he oversaw the incredible growth of the company in Hong Kong and throughout Asia after the devastating war years and continued trade with China. He also served as a director of the Hongkong & Shanghai Banking Corporation from 1955 to 1959, Vice Chairman from 1960 to 1961. It's also interesting to note that he also served as the Chairman of the bank from 1962 to 1963, holding the chairmanship title of both the bank and Jardines. As taipan of Jardines, he oversaw the opening of the company headquarters in 1956 along Connaught Road, a 16-story building which was already replaced in 1972.

He is best remembered for the historic and landmark event of leading Jardines to its initial public offering. Initially distributing the shares at $2.78, within a week it shot up to $5.22, having been oversubscribed 56 times.

During his tenure, Jardines owned much of the richest land in Hong Kong, controlled two of the island's three profitable English newspapers, and has substantial interests in banking, shipping, insurance, utilities, streetcars and airlines and being agent for 77 major companies, trading products ranging from machine tools to fine Scotch throughout Asia. He sat in Hong Kong's governing bodies and the boards of its richest banks. He presided over a time when Jardine Matheson was at the peak of its economic and political power over Hong Kong.

He founded the Penta Hotel Chain, supported by five airlines: Swissair, Alitalia, Air France, British Airways and Lufthansa. Eventually, Air France and Alitalia backed out of the deal. The hotel chain was also supported by UBS, Swiss Bank, Deutsche Bank and a British investment Bank. The Pental Hotel chain still exists but mainly in Germany.

In a Time article in 1961, he was described as "Tall (6 ft. 3 in.), suave and social, University of Cambridge educated Hugh Barton joined Jardines in 1933 as a tea taster, scrupulously lives up to the company's cherished traditions, including the raising of ponies that race under the Jardines' silks." After retiring in 1963, he became an influential diplomat in Europe, representing Hong Kong businesses' interests there.

In 1965, he became a director of SG Warburg. He was invested as a Commander of the Order of the British Empire (CBE) in 1966. In describing Jardines, a commentator stated, "Jardines always was, and still is, a Scottish house that kept the Sabbath and everything else it could lay hands on." He died in April 1989 at the age of 78.

Business positions
Preceded by John Keswick	Chairman of the Jardine Matheson; 1953–1963	Succeeded by Michael Herries
Preceded by Michael Turner	Chairman of the Hongkong & Shanghai Banking Corporation; 1962–1963	Succeeded by William Charles Knowles
