= Hubert John Collar =

British businessman (1900–1985)

Hubert John Collar, CBE (18 January 1900 – 24 July 1985) was a British businessman in China and Hong Kong. He was the Hong Kong manager of the Imperial Chemical Industries and member of the Legislative Council of Hong Kong.

Collar married Amy Frances "Bunty" Richardson, daughter of Dr. Alan Richardson, in Holy Trinity Cathedral, Shanghai in December 1924. During the Japanese occupation of Hong Kong, he was interned and served as a camp representative.

He was the Hong Kong manager of the Imperial Chemical Industries. In 1952, he was chairman of the Hong Kong General Chamber of Commerce. He was also leading member of the China Association, a London-based group representing the interests of traders in China. In 1953, he was appointed to the Legislative Council of Hong Kong as the representative of the chamber of commerce.

Collar was appointed a Commander of the Order of the British Empire (CBE) in the 1947 Birthday Honours.

Business positions
Preceded by P. S. Cassidy	Chairman of the Hong Kong General Chamber of Commerce; 1952	Succeeded by Cedric Blaker
Legislative Council of Hong Kong
Preceded by P. S. Cassidy	Unofficial Member; Representative for Hong Kong General Chamber of Commerce; 1952–1953	Succeeded by Cedric Blaker
