= William Charles Langdon Brown =

British banker (1931–2024)

William Charles Langdon Brown CBE (9 September 1931 – 29 June 2024) was a British banker of the Standard Chartered Bank. He was an unofficial member of the Legislative Council of Hong Kong from 1980 to 1985.

== Biography ==
Brown was born on 9 September 1931 in London to Charles Leonard Brown and Kathleen May Tizzard. He married Nachiko Sagawa in 1959; they have one son and two daughters. Brown was educated at the John Ruskin School, Croydon and the Ashbourne Grammar School, Derbyshire. He joined the Chartered Bank of India, Australia and China, serving throughout the Far East from 1954 to 1975. He became the area general manager, Hong Kong, from 1975–87 and senior general manager (London) for Asia Pacific Region, and the executive director of the Standard Chartered Bank PLC (SCB) in 1987.

In 1988, Brown was promoted to managing director and deputy group chief executive of Standard Chartered. From 1989 to 1991, he was the group deputy chairman. He became a non-executive director from 1991 to 1994. He was also director and treasurer of the Royal Commonwealth Society and the Commonwealth Trust from 1991 to 1995. He was also director of the Hongkong Investment Trust PLC, the Kexim Bank, the Arbuthnot Latham & Co. and chairman of the Atlantis Japan Growth Fund Ltd in the 1990s.

Brown was appointed to the Legislative Council of Hong Kong as an unofficial member from 1980 to 1985, at the time when the rate of the Hong Kong dollar was highly unstable due to the issue of Hong Kong's future change of sovereignty. As a member of the Banking Consultative Committee and the Exchange Fund Advisory Committee, Brown helped to stabilise the exchange rate. He was also director of the Hong Kong Academy for Performing Arts, the Community Chest of Hong Kong, the Hong Kong Trade Development Council, the Independent Commission Against Corruption, the Mass Transit Railway, and the Hong Kong Girl Guides Association. Brown was also chairman of the Hong Kong Association of Banks, the Hong Kong Export Credit Insurance Advisory Committee, the Special Committee on Land Supply and the Hong Kong Ballet Academy. He was the member of the council of the Chinese University of Hong Kong from 1979 to 1987. For his public service, Brown received an honorary doctoral degree of Social Science from the Chinese University of Hong Kong in 1987.

Brown died on 29 June 2024, at the age of 92.
