= Philip Stanley Cassidy =

British and Hong Kong businessman (1889–1971)

Philip Stanley Cassidy CBE, JP
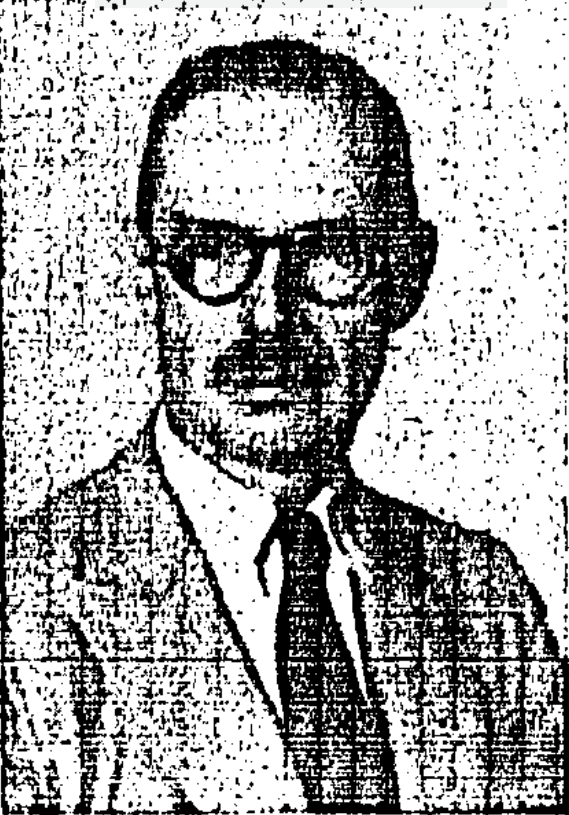

Unofficial Member of the Executive Council of Hong Kong
- In office July 1951 – April 1952
- Appointed by: Sir Alexander Grantham

Unofficial Member of the Legislative Council of Hong Kong
- In office 25 August 1948 – 30 April 1952
- Appointed by: Sir Alexander Grantham
- Preceded by: C. C. Roberts
- Succeeded by: Cedric Blaker

Personal details
- Born: 30 March 1889 Ilford, Essex, England
- Died: 14 May 1971 (aged 82) Midhurst, Sussex, England
- Spouse: Margaret Johnson (m. 1919)
- Children: Richard Ross Forbes
- Occupation: Businessman

Philip Stanley Cassidy CBE JP (30 March 1889 – 14 May 1971) was a British and Hong Kong entrepreneur. He was taipan of the John D. Hutchison & Co. and unofficial member of the Executive Council and the Legislative Council of Hong Kong.

== Biography ==
Cassidy first came to Hong Kong in 1913 and worked for the Hong Kong and Shanghai Banking Corporation before he was invited into partnership of the John D. Hutchison & Co., an import and export company, with his brother-in-law T. E. Pearce in 1922. They set up a branch office in Canton in 1929 which ceased to operate in 1941. Cassidy became the taipan of the John D. Hutchison & Co. after Pearce was killed in the Battle of Hong Kong in 1941.

He was member of the Hong Kong General Chamber of Commerce and was its chairman from 1948 to 1950 and again from 1951 to 1952. He was elected by the chamber of commerce to serve on the Legislative Council of Hong Kong in 1948 and served on the Executive Council of Hong Kong from 1951 to 1952.

He was also member of the Committee of the Diocesan Boys' School from 1922, director of the European Y.M.C.A., member of the Court of the University of Hong Kong from 1929, and officer of the St. John's Cathedral. He was also a co-founder of Cheero Club established in 1935 to provide facilities for the entertainment and recreation of British forces in Hong Kong.

He announced his retirement from public service in 1952 and returned to London. He became chairman of the Hong Kong House and was awarded Central Chancery of the Orders of Knighthood in 1959.

Cassidy married Margaret Johnson Rodger, daughter of A. Rodger of the China Sugar Refinery on 15 January 1919 at the Union Church. They had a son named Richard Ross Forbes Cassidy, an architect in Scotland.

Business positions
Preceded by T. E. Pearce	Chairman and Managing Director of John D. Hutchison & Co. 1941–1952	Succeeded by John D. Clague
Preceded by C. C. Roberts	Chairman of the Hong Kong General Chamber of Commerce; 1948–1950	Succeeded by C. C. Roberts
Preceded by C. C. Roberts	Chairman of the Hong Kong General Chamber of Commerce; 1951–1952	Succeeded by H. J. Collar
Legislative Council of Hong Kong
Preceded by C. C. Roberts	Unofficial Member; Representative for Hong Kong General Chamber of Commerce; 1948–1952	Succeeded by Cedric Blaker
