= W. C. G. Knowles =

British businessman in Hong Kong

W. C. G. Knowles CBE, MA, LLD, JP
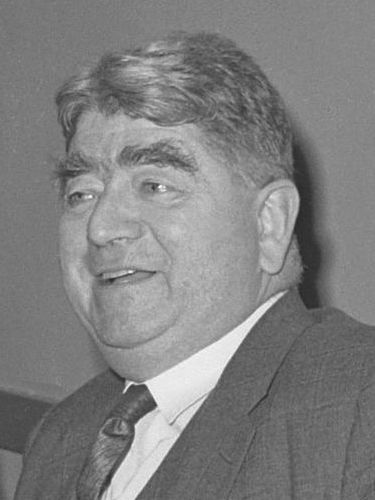

Unofficial Member of the Executive Council of Hong Kong
- In office 18 June 1963 – 1 July 1965
- Preceded by: Hugh Barton
- Succeeded by: Sidney Gordon

Unofficial Member of the Legislative Council of Hong Kong
- In office 19 July 1961 – 17 June 1964
- Preceded by: George Goldsack
- Succeeded by: George Ross

Vice-Chancellor of the University of Hong Kong
- In office 19 November 1964 – 30 June 1965
- Preceded by: Lindsay Ride
- Succeeded by: AJS McFadzean

Personal details
- Born: 12 January 1908 Bombay, British India
- Died: 13 January 1969 (aged 61) Jakarta, Indonesia
- Education: Christ's Hospital; Trinity College, Cambridge
- Occupation: Businessman

William Charles Goddard Knowles (Chinese: 鈕魯詩; 12 January 1908 – 13 January 1969) was a British businessman in Hong Kong. He was general manager of the Butterfield & Swire, chairman of Cathay Pacific, member of the Legislative Council and the Executive Council and vice-chancellor of the University of Hong Kong.

== Biography ==
Knowles was born in Bombay, British India on 12 January 1908. He was educated at Christ's Hospital, Sussex, and Trinity College, Cambridge. After he graduated he joined Butterfield & Swire and its parent company in London. From 1929 to 39, he worked in different Chinese cities including Yangtze ports, Hong Kong, Tientsin and Shanghai.

He served in the Indian Army during the Second World War and resumed his office at Butterfield & Swire in Shanghai after the war ended. He moved to Hong Kong in 1947 and was appointed general manager of the company in 1957. He was also chairman of associated companies such as Taikoo Dockyard, Taikoo Sugar Refinery, Duro Paint Manufacturing, Swire & MacLaine, Cathay Pacific and the HAECO He was also a director and later the chairman of HSBC and a director of the Hongkong Land and the Union Insurance Society of Canton.

Besides his business positions, he served on the committee of the Hong Kong General Chamber of Commerce from 1961 to 62 and was the chairman of the chamber for two years. He was also appointed founding chairman of the Hong Kong Tourist Association and member of the Legislative Council (1961–64) and the Executive Council of Hong Kong.

Knowles was manager of Butterfield & Swire until he served briefly in the office of vice-chancellor of the University of Hong Kong, in succession to Lindsay Ride, from 1964 to 1965. He had been member of the Court and Council from 1958 and treasurer of the university in 1962.

In recognition of his services to the colony and to the university he was awarded the honorary degree of Doctor of Laws in 1964. He was also awarded Commander of the Order of the British Empire (CBE) for his public service in 1965. Knowles Building in the University of Hong Kong campus is named after him. A character named Quillan Gornt in the novel Noble House is based on Knowles and John Kidston Swire, the two taipans of Butterfield & Swire.

He held the position of executive director of Lloyd's Register of Shipping when he died suddenly on a business trip in Jakarta, Indonesia on 13 January 1969.

Business positions
Preceded by George Goldsack	Chairman of the Hong Kong General Chamber of Commerce; 1961–1964	Succeeded by Sidney Gordon
Preceded by Hugh Barton	Chairman of the HSBC; 1964	Succeeded by Jake Saunders
Legislative Council of Hong Kong
Preceded by George Goldsack	Unofficial Member; Representative for Hong Kong General Chamber of Commerce; 1961–1964	Succeeded by George Ross
Academic offices
Preceded by Lindsay Ride	Vice-Chancellor of the University of Hong Kong; 1964–65	Succeeded by AJS McFadzean
