= Douglas Clague =

British businessman

The Honourable Sir John Douglas Clague CBE MC QPM CPM TD JP

Unofficial Member of the Legislative Council of Hong Kong
- In office 1956–1960

Unofficial Member of the Executive Council of Hong Kong
- In office 1961–1974

Personal details
- Born: 13 June 1917 South Rhodesia
- Died: 11 March 1981 (aged 63) Berkshire, England

Sir John Douglas Clague (13 June 1917 – 11 March 1981) was a British Hong Kong soldier and entrepreneur who spent most of his life in Hong Kong.

== Early years ==
Born in Southern Rhodesia, in 1917, Clague arrived in Hong Kong in 1940 as a lieutenant in the Royal Artillery, and on the outbreak of World War II became a prisoner in the Sham Shui Po PoW camp. He later escaped, and joined the British Army Aid Group in free China. On the ending of the war, he famously took the surrender of Japanese forces in Bangkok more or less single-handedly.

== Business career ==
After the war, he became the tai-pan of the British Hong Kong hong Hutchison, better known as Hutchison Whampoa. He overstretched his finances, which resulted in HSBC taking over the firm, replacing Clague, and led to the sale of Hutchison Whampoa to Li Ka-Shing's Cheung Kong in 1979.

Clague was also one of the commandants of the Royal Hong Kong Auxiliary Police Force, and a member of both the Executive and the Legislative Councils of Hong Kong, when he succeeded Cedric Blaker on 21 March 1958. From 1950 to 1951 he was President of the Gunners Roll of Hong Kong.

Clague owned a lodge at Kam Tsin in the northern New Territories alongside many other wealthy people.

He was also a racehorse owner and one time chairman of the Royal Hong Kong Jockey Club; it was under his tenure that the Sha Tin Racecourse was developed. The Clague Garden Estate in Tsuen Wan is named for him, as he was also one of the longest serving chairmen of the Hong Kong Housing Society.

== Personal ==
Clague was married to Lady Margaret Isolin Clague (née Cowley); they had three children (Jonathan, Penny and Isolin).

Sir John Douglas Clague died of cancer aged 64, in 1981. Lady Clague died in 2011.

== Honours ==
- United Kingdom :
  - Military Cross (MC) (1942)
  - Officer of the Military Division of Order of the British Empire (OBE) (1943)
  - Territorial Decoration (TD)
  - Commander of the Military Division of Order of the British Empire (CBE) (1946)
  - Justice of the Peace (JP) (1952)
  - Recipient of the Colonial Police Medal (CPM) (1966)
  - Recipient of the Queen's Police Medal (QPM) (1968)
  - Knight Bachelor (Kt) – Sir (1971)

Business positions
Preceded by P. S. Cassidy	Chairman and Managing Director of John D. Hutchison & Co. 1952–1977	Succeeded by Himself as Chairman and Managing Director of Hutchison Whampoa
Preceded by Himself as Chairman of John D. Hutchison & Co.	Chairman of Hutchison Whampoa; 1977–1979	Succeeded by Bill Wyllie
Preceded by Himself as Managing Director of John D. Hutchison & Co.	Managing Director of Hutchison Whampoa; 1977–1979	Succeeded by Li Ka-shing
Sporting positions
Preceded by Sir John Saunders	Chairman of the Royal Hong Kong Jockey Club; 1972–1974	Succeeded by P. G. Williams
