= 1998 Financial Services by-election =

Legislative Council of Hong Kong election

- 16 October 1998
Candidate	Fung Chi-kin
Party	HKPA
Electoral vote	Uncontested
Member before election
Chim Pui-chung (impeached)
Nonpartisan
Elected Member
Fung Chi-kin
HKPA

The 1998 Financial Services by-election was originally scheduled on 5 November 1998 after impeachment of the incumbent Legislative Councillor Chim Pui-chung for conspiring to forge documents. Fung Chi-kin from the Hong Kong Progressive Alliance and was declared elected on 16 October after uncontested, retaining the seat for the pro-Beijing camp. This was the first legislative by-election after the handover of Hong Kong.

== Background ==
Chim Pui-chung was first elected to the Legislative Council in 1991 to the Financial Services constituency, and re-elected in 1994. Chim was then elected to the Provisional Legislative Council and therefore remained in the legislative branch despite the dissolution of the colonial parliament.

Chim, despite facing charges of conspiring to forge documents, was re-elected to the same constituency in May 1998. He was convicted on 1 August 1998, and sentenced to 3 years in jail two days later by the High Court.

According to Article 79(6) of the Basic Law, the President of the Legislative Council shall declare that members of the Council are no longer qualified for the office when they are convicted and sentenced to imprisonment for one month or more for a criminal offence committed within or outside Hong Kong and two-thirds of the members of the Legislative Council present vote to relieve the member of their duties.

== Impeachment ==
On 9 September 1998, after the summer recess ended, Edward Leong moved a resolution in the Council which reads:

That whereas the Honourable CHIM Pui-chung was convicted on 1 August 1998 in the Court of First Instance of the High Court in the Hong Kong Special Administrative Region of a criminal offence, and was sentenced on 3 August 1998 by the same Court to imprisonment for one month or more (as particularized in the Schedule), this Council relieves the Honourable CHIM Pui-chung of his duties as a Member of the Legislative Council.

A voting was followed by the debate. The question was put which reads: "That the resolution moved by Dr LEONG Che-hung, as set out on the Agenda, be passed."

Out of 59 members of the parliament, 47 were in the chamber. Chim applied to the Correctional Services for leave of absence to attend the meeting, but he declined to undertake the prescribed conditions and restrictions, in which circumstances the requested leave of absence cannot be granted. President of the Council did not vote per custom. Raymond Ho from the pro-Beijing camp was the only abstention. 46 voted for the resolution in a bipartisanship consensus.

Impeachment of Chim Pui-chung
Ballot →	9 September 1998
Yes	45 / 59
No	0 / 59
Abstain	1 / 59
Did not vote	13 / 59

Upon the adoption of the resolution, the President announced that: "In accordance with Article 79 of the Basic Law of the Hong Kong Special Administrative Region of the People's Republic of China, I now declare that Mr CHIM Pui-chung is no longer qualified for the office of a Member of the Legislative Council." A seat therefore became vacant.

== Result ==
During the nomination period from 24 September to 7 October, only one valid nomination by Fung Chi-kin from the Hong Kong Progressive Alliance was received on the first day of the period.

On 16 October, the Returning Officer declared Fung Chi-kin as being duly elected as a legislator returned from the Financial Services functional constituency.

1998 Financial Services by-election
Party	Candidate	Votes	%	±%
HKPA	Fung Chi-kin	Uncontested		
HKPA gain from Nonpartisan		Swing		

== Aftermath ==
Fung took the oath on 21 October at the first meeting after the election.

Chim appealed to Court of Appeal later that year and had his jail terms reduced to a year. He staged a political comeback in 2004 and returned to the constituency, and kept his seat in the 2008 election. He abandoned his re-election campaign in 2012, ending his career in the parliament.

== See also ==
- List of Hong Kong by-elections
