= Simon Li =

The Honourable Simon Li Fook-sean GBM
- 李福善

Acting Chief Justice of the Supreme Court of Hong Kong
- In office 1986–1986
- Appointed by: Sir Edward Youde
- Preceded by: Denys Roberts
- Succeeded by: Denys Roberts

Personal details
- Born: 19 April 1922 Hong Kong
- Died: 26 February 2013 (aged 90) Hong Kong
- Spouse: Marie Veronica Lillian Yang
- Children: Simon Li; Joseph Li; Gladys Li; Stephen Li; Paul Li
- Education: King's College; University of Hong Kong; University College London
- Occupation: Judge

Simon Li Fook-sean GBM (Chinese: 李福善; 19 April 1922 – 26 February 2013) was a Hong Kong senior judge and politician.

== Education and judiciary career ==
Li was educated at King's College between 1937 and 1941 and then the University of Hong Kong. He also spent time studying in Mainland China. He studied law at University College London from 1947 to 1950 and was called to Lincoln's Inn Bar in London in 1951. He was conferred a Doctor of Laws honoris causa by the Chinese University of Hong Kong in 1986.

He returned to Hong Kong and became a crown counsel in Hong Kong's Legal Department in 1953. He became a District Court judge in 1963. Li was the first Chinese judge to be appointed to the High Court in 1971 and was elevated to Justice of Appeal in 1980. He was the first Chinese to be appointed Vice-President of the Court of Appeal in 1984. In 1986 he became the first Hong Kong Chinese to act as Chief Justice for the then Chief Justice Denys Roberts. He retired in 1987 at the age of 64 as the colony's most senior Chinese judge.

== Politics ==
After the Sino-British Joint Declaration was initialled in 1984, Li was appointed to the Independent Monitoring Team on the Assessment Office to monitor the acceptability of the Sino-British Draft Agreement. He subsequently was appointed by the Beijing government to many positions during the transition period. He was a member of the Hong Kong Basic Law Drafting Committee, a Hong Kong Affairs Adviser, and deputy director of the preliminary working committee of the Preparatory Committee for the Hong Kong Special Administrative Region.

In the 1996 First Hong Kong Chief Executive election, Li campaigned against Yang Ti-liang, who succeeded Denys Robert as Chief Justice; Peter Woo, tycoon and son-in-law of Y. K. Pao, and the eventual winner Tung Chee-hwa. Li initially supported Lo Tak-shing for the Chief Executive race. After Lo withdrew, Li announced his own candidacy and became the last of the four to join the race. Li failed to get enough nominations, receiving just 43 votes, and was eliminated in the election. Tung won a landslide victory in the election by the 400-member Selection Committee orchestrated by the Beijing government. In 1997, Li received Hong Kong's highest honour, the Grand Bauhinia Medal.

== Public services ==
Li also held numerous positions including the vice-chairperson of Fu Hong Society, honorary steward of the Hong Kong Jockey Club, director of his family owned Bank of East Asia, director of King's College Old Boys' Association School Board, director of Rev. Joseph Carra Education Fund, council member of the Society for Rehabilitation, honorary president of the Scout Association of Hong Kong, chairman of the Insurance Claims Complaints Board, and director and chairman of the Widow and Orphan Pension Board.

He also established the Mr Li Koon Chun Memorial Fund and the Dr Simon Li Fook Sean and Madam Yang Yen Ying Fund for supporting the finances of the Chinese University of Hong Kong.

== Death and family ==
Li suffered from ill health and was sent to hospital with a chronic respiration problem in about 2012. He died of heart failure at the Hong Kong Sanatorium and Hospital surrounded by his family on 26 February 2013 at the age of 91.

His brother Ronald Li Fook-shiu was the chairman of the Hong Kong Stock Exchange and was jailed for corruption in 1991. His nephews include former Legislative Councillor David Li Kwok-po, the Bank of East Asia chairman and Arthur Li Kwok-cheung, deputy chairman at the bank, former Secretary for Education and former Dean of the Faculty of Medicine at the Chinese University of Hong Kong.

Simon Li had four sons and one daughter. His second son Joseph Li died suddenly in Britain in 1995. His only daughter Gladys Li was the ex-chairwoman of the Hong Kong Bar Association and member of the Civic Party. She also represented the domestic helpers in the Vallejos v. Commissioner of Registration.

Li is of Waitun village, Heshan, Guangdong ancestry.

Legal offices
Preceded by Denys Roberts	Chief Justice of the Supreme Court of Hong Kong; Acting; 1986	Succeeded by Denys Roberts
