= 1996 Hong Kong Chief Executive election =

- 11 December 1996

All 400 votes of the Selection Committee 201 votes needed to win
- Opinion polls
- Turnout: 99.50%
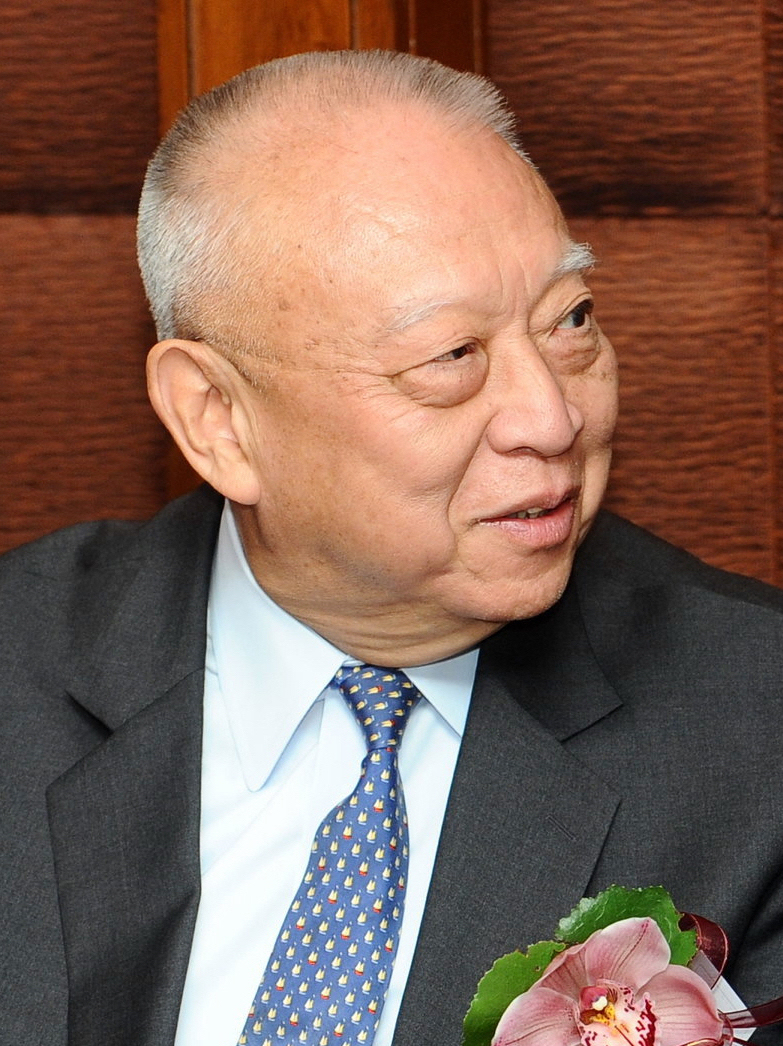

Nominee	Tung Chee-hwa	Yang Ti-liang	Peter Woo
Party	Nonpartisan	Nonpartisan	Nonpartisan
Alliance	Pro-Beijing	Pro-Beijing	Pro-Beijing
Electoral vote	320	42	36
Percentage	80.40%	10.55%	9.05%
Governor before election
Chris Patten
Nonpartisan
Elected Chief Executive
Tung Chee-hwa
Nonpartisan

The 1996 Hong Kong Chief Executive election was held on 11 December 1996 to select the first Chief Executive (CE) of the Hong Kong Special Administrative Region (HKSAR) which term started from 1 July 1997 after the Chinese resumption of sovereignty over Hong Kong from the British rule. It was selected by the 400-member Selection Committee installed by the Government of the People's Republic of China (PRC). Tung Chee-hwa, a Shanghai-born Hong Kong businessman who was seen being favoured by Jiang Zemin, General Secretary of the Chinese Communist Party, was the ultimate winner of the election, defeating former Chief Justice Ti-liang Yang and tycoon Peter Woo with a large margin.

== Electoral method ==
According to the Basic Law of Hong Kong, the mini-constitution of the HKSAR, the first Chief Executive was selected by a 400-member Selection Committee. The Selection Committee was chosen by the Preparatory Committee in Beijing on 2 November 1996. Members of the pro-Beijing party Democratic Alliance for the Betterment of Hong Kong secured 40 places on the Selection Committee, while Leong Che-hung and some other prominent liberals were not elected.

The Selection Committee was also responsible for the selection to the 60 seats to the Provisional Legislative Council (PLC) on 21 December 1996.

== Candidates ==
The first potential candidate was Lo Tak-shing, Oxford-educated lawyer and son of prominent Eurasian lawyer and politician Man-kam Lo. Once officeholder in the British colonial government, Lo gave up his British citizenship and his title of the Commander of the Order of the British Empire (CBE) for the Chinese citizenship in the early 1990s. When his popularity rating was only around one per cent, Lo withdrew on 17 October 1996.

Simon Li, former judge and director of the Bank of East Asia and nephew of the prominent businessman and politician Li Tse-fong who initially supported Lo Tak-shing entered the race in November 1996, after Lo withdrew. Li supported the controversial Beijing-controlled Provisional Legislative Council (PLC) and tightening public security to maintain Hong Kong's stability and prosperity.

Chief Justice Yang Ti-liang first surfaced as a contender a year before the election. However, his chances were wrecked as a top Chinese official leaked to the press some negative remarks Yang supposedly made on the Hong Kong Bill of Rights Ordinance, which made him unpopular among the pro-democracy camp. In September 1996, Yang gave up his British knighthood and resigned as Chief Justice to run in the race. He received support from a veteran pro-Beijing publisher Xu Simin, the pro-Beijing party Democratic Alliance for the Betterment of Hong Kong as well as the local Xinhua News Agency. He was also reportedly backed by Lee Shau-kee, Hong Kong's richest man and real estate developer. Yang voiced his support for the Beijing government and warned against challenging the Chinese supremacy.

Peter Woo, son-in-law of late legendary shipping tycoon Y. K. Pao checked with Beijing before announcing his intention to run. He officially announced his candidacy on 1 October 1996 by issuing a formal platform. He pledged "to establish the authority and image of an SAR government, uphold the rule of law, defend social justice, speak for the interests of the people of Hong Kong and conduct the affairs of the government with transparency."

Tung Chee-hwa, a Shanghai-born Hong Kong shipping magnate, was not widely known until the campaign began. He was supported by influential tycoon Henry Fok whom he had a longtime relationship with. The election was considered by many pundits as a done deal as the China's paramount leader and General Secretary Jiang Zemin singled Tung out for an exceptional cordial handshake at a meeting in Beijing long before the election in January 1996. He was endorsed by powerful tycoon Li Ka-shing.

London's favourite Chief Secretary Anson Chan, the most senior civil servant in the colonial government, was a potential candidate which received substantial support in the society. Chan was thought to be too closely linked to Governor Chris Patten to be acceptable to Beijing. She declined her candidacy on 26 October 1996, but reiterated her willingness to continue to serve the people of Hong Kong "without fear or favour."

Other candidates included retired High Court judge Arthur Garcia who dropped out later, as well as Au Yuk-lun, Du Sen, Choi Ching-kui and Yu Hon-bui.

The pro-democrats also backed veteran politician and member of the Legislative Council Szeto Wah to launch a petition movement as the civil Chief Executive to mock the election of the 400-member Selection Committee. Szeto accumulated more than 104,000 signatures with their ID numbers as a result.

== Nomination ==
The nomination session was held on 15 November 1996 at the Hong Kong Convention and Exhibition Centre (HKCEC). Only three of the eight candidates received the qualifying minimum of 50 votes from the Selection Committee. Tung Chee-hwa, Ti-liang Yang and Peter Woo all secured more than 50 nominations to enter the race, while Simon Li, to his shock, fell a few votes by winning 43 nominations only and was eliminated. Tung became the leading candidate by winning an absolute majority of 206 votes in the Selection Committee.

Chinese Foreign Minister Qian Qichen who oversaw the ballot casting described the event as "the dawn of genuine democracy in Hong Kong."

Candidate	Born	Party	Most recent position	Nominations received
Tung Chee-hwa 董建華	7 July 1937 (age 59)	Nonpartisan (Pro-Beijing)	Unofficial member of Executive Council of Hong Kong (1992–1996)	206 / 400 (52%)
Yang Ti-liang 楊鐵樑	30 June 1929 (age 67)	Nonpartisan (Pro-Beijing)	Chief Justice of Hong Kong (1988–1996)	82 / 400 (21%)
Peter Woo 吳光正	5 September 1946 (age 50)	Nonpartisan (Pro-Beijing)	Chairman of the Hospital Authority (1995–2000)	54 / 400 (14%)

== Opinion polling ==
In August 1996, public opinion polls showed Anson Chan had the most popular support, having more than 50% far ahead of Tung Chee-hwa's 5%. After Chan was dropped from the polling, Ti-liang Yang surged into the lead. Tung kept catching up in the polls in the later stage. In an opinion survey published on 2 December, 46% of the respondents said they preferred Tung, compared to 28% for Yang and 5.2% for Peter Woo.

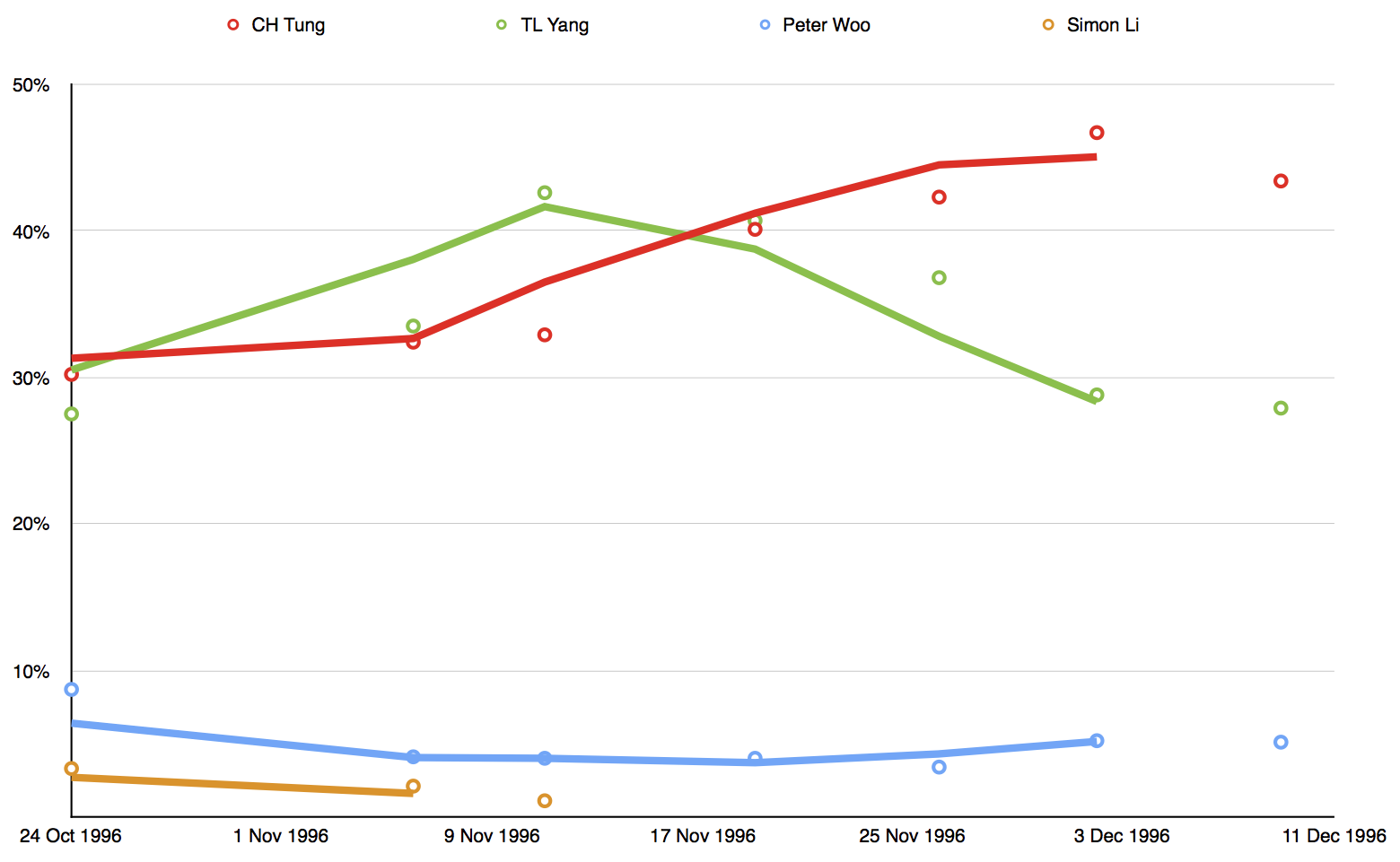

Date(s) conducted	Polling source	Tung Chee-hwa	Yang Ti-liang	Peter Woo	Simon Li	Others	Don't know/ Abstain
9 Dec 1996	HKUPOP	43.4%	27.9%	5.1%	-	-	23.6%
2 Dec 1996	HKUPOP	46.7%	28.8%	5.2%	-	-	19.2%
25–26 Nov 1996	HKUPOP	42.3%	36.8%	3.4%	-	-	17.5%
18–19 Nov 1996	HKUPOP	40.1%	40.7%	4.0%	-	-	15.3%
11 Nov 1996	HKUPOP	32.9%	42.6%	4.0%	1.1%	0.5%	19.0%
5–6 Nov 1996	HKUPOP	32.4%	33.5%	4.1%	2.1%	0.4%	27.5%
23–24 Oct 1996	HKUPOP	30.2%	27.5%	8.7%	3.3%	-	30.4%

== Result ==
On 11 December 1996, the election was held at the Hong Kong Convention and Exhibition Centre (HKCEC), where 400-member Selection Committee elected Tung Chee-hwa as the Chief Executive. Tung received 320 votes against 49 votes for Ti-liang Yang and 36 votes for Peter Woo.

11 December 1996 Hong Kong Chief Executive election results
Party	Candidate	Votes	%	±%
Nonpartisan	Tung Chee-hwa	320	80.40	
Nonpartisan	Yang Ti-liang	42	10.55	
Nonpartisan	Peter Woo	36	9.05	
Total votes		398	100	
Turnout		398	99.50	
Registered electors		400		

== Protest ==
29 pro-democracy activists including legislators Emily Lau, Lee Cheuk-yan and Andrew Cheng protested against the election outside the HKECC during the election. A "tomb of democracy" was established outside the building shouting "oppose the phony election". Lau and Cheng scuffled with riot police and lay on the street. They were later bodily removed and taken to the Wan Chai Police Station.

== Aftermath ==
Tung Chee-hwa was appointed as the first Chief Executive of the HKSAR by Premier Li Peng under State Council Order 207 at the Great Hall of the People in Beijing on 18 December 1996. Tung was subsequently sworn in at midnight on 1 July 1997 as the HKSAR was formally established. His term of office was compounded with serious social problems including the right of abode issue, the Asian financial crisis, the bird flu pandemic and a host of other issues.

== See also ==
- 1990s in Hong Kong
- Handover of Hong Kong
- 1996 Hong Kong provisional legislative election
