= Henry Wu (politician) =

Hong Kong politician

Henry Wu 胡經昌 BBS, JP

Member of the Legislative Council
- In office 1 October 2000 – 30 September 2004
- Preceded by: Fung Chi-kin
- Succeeded by: Chim Pui-chung
- Constituency: Financial Services

Member of the Provisional Legislative Council
- In office 21 December 1996 – 30 June 1998

Personal details
- Born: 23 August 1951 (age 75) Hong Kong
- Party: Progressive Alliance (1990s)
- Education: University of Toronto
- Occupation: Merchant

Henry Wu King-cheong, BBS, JP (born 22 August 1951, Hong Kong) is a Hong Kong former politician and member of the Provisional Legislative Council (1996–98) and Legislative Council in 1998–2000 for Financial Services. He was also the chairman of the Federation of Hong Kong and Kowloon Labour Unions from 1995 to 1999. He was also the member of the Chinese People's Political Consultative Conference National Committee, Hong Kong Housing Authority and councilor of the Hong Kong Polytechnic University. He worked closely with Beijing before the handover of Hong Kong and joined the Preparatory Committee for the Hong Kong Special Administrative Region which oversaw the last phrase of the transition of the sovereignty. He was appointed to the Provisional Urban Council (1997–99) and Eastern District Council (2000–08).

Legislative Council of Hong Kong
| New parliament | Member of Provisional Legislative Council; 1997–1998 | Replaced by Legislative Council |
