= Shenzhen Guesthouse Hotel =

Hotel in Shenzhen, Guangdong, China

Shenzhen Guesthouse Hotel (simplified Chinese: 深圳迎宾馆; traditional Chinese: 深圳迎賓館) is a three-star hotel in the Dongmen business district of Shenzhen, China.

== Description ==
The main structure of the hotel is a winged 11 storey tower with 620 rooms and located on 15 Xin Yuan Road in the Lu Hu District of Shenzhen. The hotel is a short distance (3 minutes by car) from the Hong Kong-China border at Lo Wu Control Point. The complex has 10 villas that provide more private accommodations for important guests.

== History ==
Xinyuan Guest House (simplified Chinese: 新园招待; traditional Chinese: 新園招待所) was founded in 1959. Following the creation of Shenzhen, Xinyuan Guest House was renamed to Shenzhen Guesthouse Hotel (simplified Chinese: 深圳迎宾馆; traditional Chinese: 深圳迎賓館) in April 1983. In February 1985, the hotel split from the Xinyuan Hotel (simplified Chinese: 新園大飯店; traditional Chinese: 新园大酒店), which was on its south side. Shenzhen Guesthouse Hotel underwent an expansion and by 1985 occupied 46,200 m^{2} (497,000 sq ft), of which the building space took up about 7,100 m^{2} (76,000 sq ft). That year, the hotel employed 300 people and had two multi-story buildings that had 85 rooms. It had three villas named Cypress Garden (Chinese: 柏园), Osmanthus Garden (Chinese: 桂园), and Plum Garden (Chinese: 梅园). In 1998, Xinyuan Hotel and Shenzhen Guesthouse Hotel merged. Occupying 200 acres, the hotel in 1999 had 600 rooms, 17 conference rooms, and 14 restaurants that seated over 1,600 people.

Members of the government of China frequently have used Shenzhen Guesthouse Hotel to host foreign dignitaries. Senior Chinese leaders frequently stay at the hotel. Deng Xiaoping, China's paramount leader, lodged at the hotel in 1984. During his southern tour in 1992, he gave a speech at the hotel. The Chinese leaders Jiang Zemin and Li Peng and their delegation stayed at the hotel prior to making their way across the Lo Wu Bridge as part of the handover of Hong Kong in 1997.

One of the conference halls of the hotel housed the Provisional Legislative Council of Hong Kong from September 1996 to 27 January 1997. Besides hosting the provisional Hong Kong Government, the hotel has hosted mainland government needs.

== See also ==
- Legislative Council Building

Preceded by None - new body	Home of the Provisional Legislative Council of Hong Kong; September 1996 - 25 January 1997	Succeeded by Huaxia Art Centre
