= 1996 Hong Kong provisional legislative election =

- 21 December 1996

All 60 seats to the Provisional Legislative Council 31 seats needed for a majority
- Registered: 400
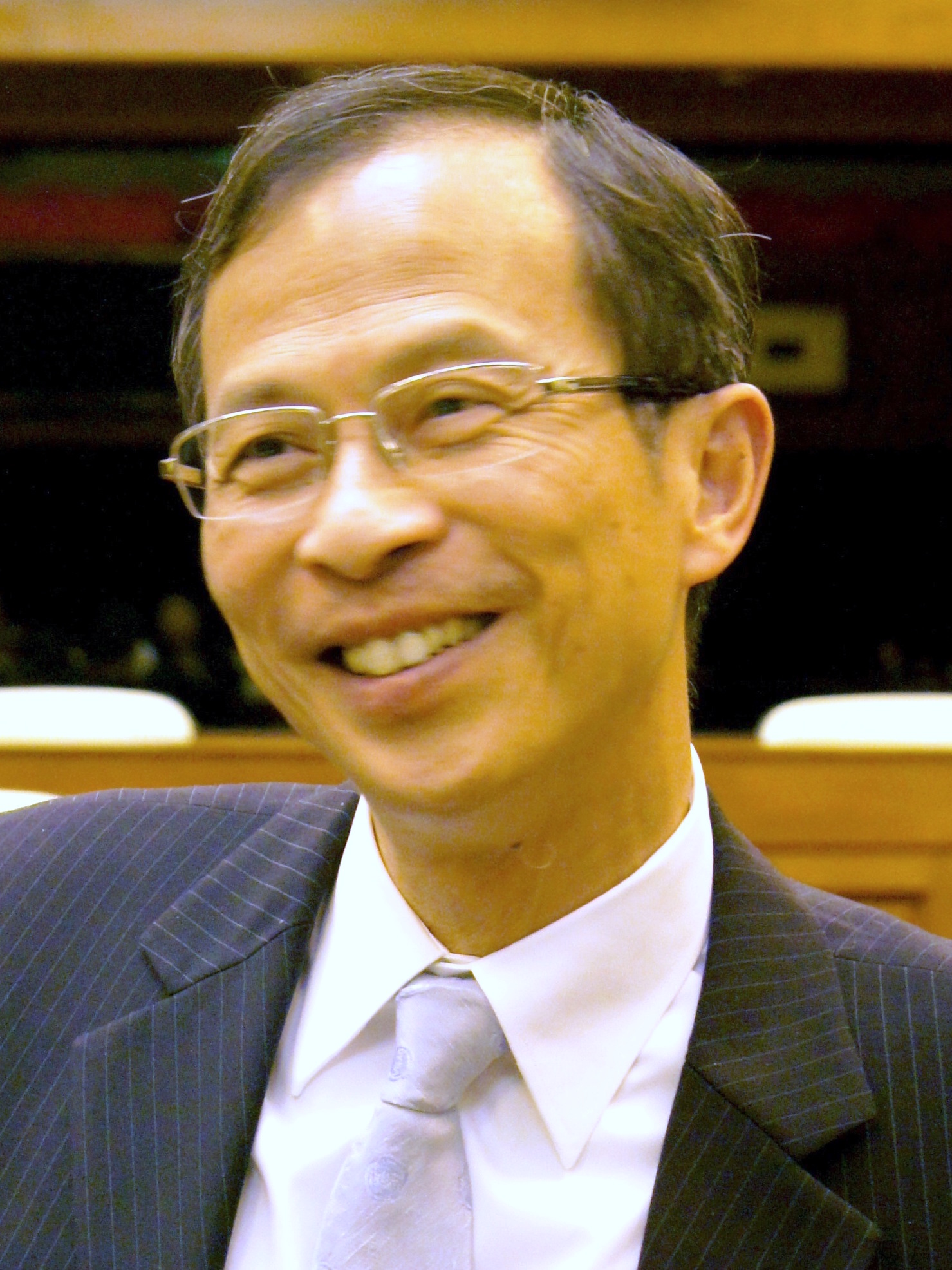

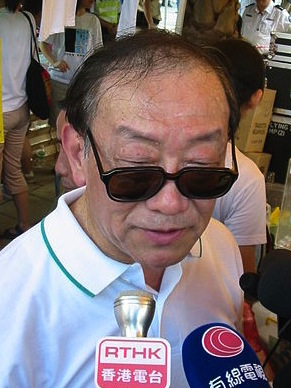

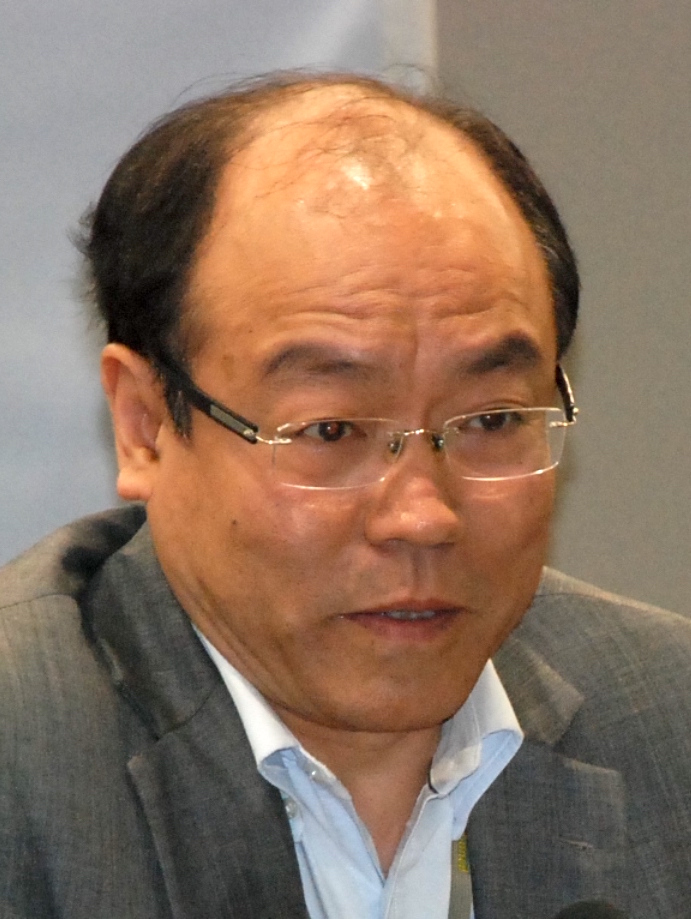
	First party	Second party	Third party
Leader	Tsang Yok-sing	Allen Lee	Ambrose Lau
Party	DAB	Liberal	HKPA
Alliance	Pro-Beijing	Pro-Beijing	Pro-Beijing
Last election	6 seats, 15.4%	10 seats, 1.6%	1 seat, 2.85%
Seats won	10	10	6
	Fourth party	Fifth party	Sixth party
Leader	Frederick Fung	Hu Fa-kuang	Wai Kee-shun
Party	ADPL	LDF	NHKA
Alliance	Pan-democracy	Pro-Beijing	Pro-Beijing
Last election	4 seats, 9.55%	1 seat, 1.27%	1 seat
Seats won	4	3	2
Party control after election
Pro-Beijing camp

The 1996 Hong Kong Provisional Legislative Council election was held on 21 December 1996 for the members of the Provisional Legislative Council (PLC). The 60 members of the PLC were elected by the Selection Committee, a 400-member body elected by the Preparatory Committee for the Hong Kong Special Administrative Region, a Beijing-appointed body which was responsible for implementation work related to the establishment of the HKSAR.

Being set up to replace the existing legislature elected in 1995, the election was challenged by the British government of its legality, and therefore had to take place in Shenzhen. It was also boycotted by the major pro-democracy party Democratic Party, despite another pro-democracy Hong Kong Association for Democracy and People's Livelihood (ADPL) deciding to contest in the election.

The pro-Beijing Democratic Alliance for the Betterment of Hong Kong (DAB) and pro-business Liberal Party both became the largest parties in the provisional legislature by winning 10 seats, while all four ADPL candidates were elected. Rita Fan was elected as the President of the PLC. The session lasted for one year and was replaced by the 1st Legislative Council in 1998.

== Background ==
The decision for establishment of the Provisional Legislative Council was decided by the Preparatory Committee for the Hong Kong Special Administrative Region, a Beijing-appointed body which was responsible for implementation work related to the establishment of the HKSAR, to fill the constitutional vacuum left by the Beijing government's decision on overthrowing the "through-train" proposal to let the colonial Legislative Council elected in 1995 transition through the transfer of sovereignty over Hong Kong in 1997, after the Sino-British disagreement on the constitutional reform made by the colonial governor Chris Patten.

The Preparatory Committee decided that the 60 members of the Provisional Legislative Council should be elected by the 400-member Selection Committee which was elected by the Preparatory Committee for the first Chief Executive election in 1996.

== Results ==
On 21 December 1996, the Selection Committee elected the 60 members of the Provisional Legislative Council from a list of 130 candidates in Shenzhen as the legality of the PLC was challenged by the colonial authorities. The candidate list was finalised ten days before the election. Of those 130, 91 were members of the Selection Committee itself and 35 were the losers of the 1995 election.

Most members of the pro-democracy camp including the Democratic Party boycotted the election as it deemed it as "undemocratic", while moderate Hong Kong Association for Democracy and People's Livelihood (ADPL) initially opposed but then agreed to join the interim body. This led to a group of 16 members leaving to form the Social Democratic Front. The ADPL had four members elected to the Provisional Legislative Council, which became the only representatives of the pro-democracy camp in the provisional legislature. The pro-Beijing Democratic Alliance for the Betterment of Hong Kong (DAB) vice-chairman Tam Yiu-chung received the most votes with 345 and Timothy Fok, son of the pro-Beijing tycoon Henry Fok scraped through with 163.

Qian Qichen, Vice Premier and Foreign Minister of the People's Republic of China, in his capacity as chairman of the Preparatory Committee, condemned the British for their lack of courage in facing the reality of the provisional legislature and said that the election was forced to be held in Shenzhen since the British refused to cooperate in an introductory speech. Qian also hailed the election as "just, fair and open".

In Hong Kong, Governor Chris Patten called the whole process "stomach-turning" and told China that the reality it should face was that one million people had voted in September 1995 to elect the existing Legislative Council. "Now four hundred people - four hundred - in a bizarre farce are voting for a so-called provisional legislature...the other reality is that Hong Kong is a first world economy which some mainland officials are trying to get to accept the sort of."

Overall Summary of the 21 December 1996 Provisional Legislative Council election results
Parties	Vote	%	Candidates	Seats
Democratic Alliance for the Betterment of Hong Kong	3,486	17.21	17	10
Liberal Party	2,950	14.49	15	10
Hong Kong Progressive Alliance	2,131	10.47	15	6
Liberal Democratic Federation of Hong Kong	899	4.42	6	3
New Hong Kong Alliance	680	3.34	4	2
Hong Kong Federation of Trade Unions	578	2.84	3	1
New Territories Association of Societies	305	1.50	1	1
Federation of Hong Kong and Kowloon Labour Unions	275	1.35	1	1
Civil Force	205	1.01	1	1
Heung Yee Kuk	292	1.43	3	0
Hong Kong Chinese Reform Association	66	0.32	1	0
Pro-Beijing independents	5,281	25.94	59	21
Total for pro-Beijing camp	18,976	93.20	124	54
Hong Kong Association for Democracy and People's Livelihood	904	4.44	4	4
Total for pro-democracy camp	904	4.44	4	4
Non-aligned independents	481	2.36	2	2
Total	20,361	100.00	130	60

== See also ==
- 1996 Hong Kong Chief Executive election
