= Robert Lee Wai-wang =

Hong Kong politician

The Honourable Robert Lee
- 李惟宏
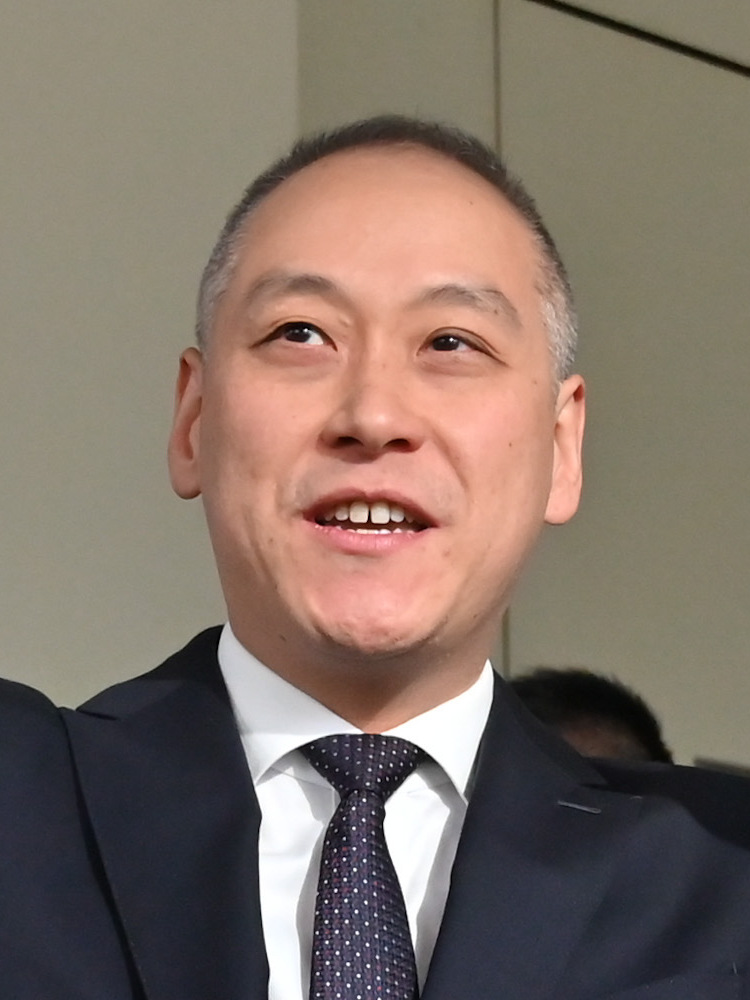
- Lee in 2025

Member of the Legislative Council
- Incumbent
- Assumed office 1 January 2022
- Preceded by: Christopher Cheung
- Constituency: Financial Services

Personal details
- Education: Bard College (BA); University of Pennsylvania (MS)

Robert Lee Wai-wang (Chinese: 李惟宏) is a Hong Kong businessman and politician who has been serving as the member of the Legislative Council for Financial Services since 2022. In the 2021 election, he won more votes than the incumbent legislator, Christopher Cheung, and took the seat.

In October 2022, despite ongoing restrictions when flying into Hong Kong for normal residents, Lee said in reference to the Global Financial Leaders' Investment Summit that "Hong Kong is open for business. I think that message should be loud and clear."

== Electoral history ==
2021 Legislative Council election: Financial Services
Party	Candidate	Votes	%	±%
Nonpartisan	Lee Wai Wang Robert	314	65.01	N/A
BPA	Cheung Wah Fung Christopher	169	34.99	−16.49
Majority		145	30.02	
Total valid votes		483		
Turnout				
Nonpartisan gain from BPA				
