= Financial Services (constituency) =

Functional constituency of Hong Kong

Financial Services 金融服務界
- Functional constituency for the Legislative Council of Hong Kong
- Region: Hong Kong
- Electorate: 562

Current constituency
- Created: 1998
- Number of members: One
- Member: Robert Lee (Independent)

The Financial Services functional constituency (Chinese: 金融服務界功能界別) is a functional constituency in the elections for the Legislative Council of Hong Kong first created in 1991. The constituency is composed of 760 financial services participants. These are, specifically, corporate members of the Chinese Gold and Silver Exchange Society entitled to vote at general meetings, and participants of other exchange societies.

== Return members ==
Election	Member	Party
1991	Chim Pui-chung	Independent
1995	Chim Pui-chung	Independent
Not represented in the PLC (1997–1998)
1998	Chim Pui-chung	Independent
1998 (b)	Fung Chi-kin	Progressive Alliance
2000	Henry Wu	Independent
2004	Chim Pui-chung	Independent
2008	Chim Pui-chung	Independent
2012	Christopher Cheung	Independent→BPA
2016	Christopher Cheung	BPA
2021	Robert Lee	Independent
2025	Robert Lee	Independent

== Electoral results ==
=== 2020s ===
2025 Legislative Council election: Financial Services
Party	Candidate	Votes	%	±%
Independent	Robert Lee Wai-wang	227	58.35	−6.66
Independent	Lian Shaodong	162	41.65	
Majority		65	16.70	
Total valid votes		389	100.00	
Rejected ballots		1		
Turnout		390	69.40	+2.87
Registered electors		562		
Independent hold		Swing		

2021 Legislative Council election: Financial Services
Party	Candidate	Votes	%	±%
Independent	Robert Lee Wai-wang	314	65.01	
BPA	Christopher Cheung Wah-fung	169	34.99	−16.49
Majority		145	30.02	+8.13
Total valid votes		483	100.00	
Rejected ballots		4		
Turnout		487	66.53	−23.96
Registered electors		760		
Independent gain from BPA		Swing		

=== 2010s ===
2016 Legislative Council election: Financial Services
Party	Candidate	Votes	%	±%
BPA	Christopher Cheung Wah-fung	261	51.48	+6.65
Independent	Ricky Chim Kim-lun	150	29.59	
Independent	Tsui Luen-on	96	18.93	
Majority		111	21.89	
Total valid votes		507	100.00	
Rejected ballots		26		
Turnout		533	90.49	
Registered electors		589		
BPA hold		Swing		

2012 Legislative Council election: Financial Services
Party	Candidate	Votes	%	±%
Independent	Christopher Cheung Wah-fung	208	44.83	
Independent	Vincent Marshall Lee Kwan-ho	202	43.53	
Independent	Frankie Yan Man-sing	25	5.39	
Independent	Tang Yu-lap	24	5.17	
Independent	Patrick Lam Tak-ming	5	1.08	
Majority		6	1.30	
Total valid votes		464	100.00	
Rejected ballots		19		
Turnout		483	85.64	
Registered electors		564		
Independent gain from Independent		Swing		

=== 2000s ===
2008 Legislative Council election: Financial Services
Party	Candidate	Votes	%	±%
Independent	Chim Pui-chung	Unopposed		
Registered electors		580		
Independent hold		Swing		

2004 Legislative Council election: Financial Services
Party	Candidate	Votes	%	±%
Independent	Chim Pui-chung	275	51.69	
Independent	Christopher Cheung Wah-fung	92	17.29	
Independent	Henry Wu King-cheong	87	16.35	−37.12
Liberal	Fung Ka-pun	61	11.47	
HKPA	Fung Chi-kin	17	3.20	−36.98
Majority		183	34.40	
Total valid votes		532	100.00	
Rejected ballots		19		
Turnout		541	84.01	
Registered electors		644		
Independent gain from Independent		Swing		

2000 Legislative Council election: Financial Services
Party	Candidate	Votes	%	±%
Independent	Henry Wu King-cheong	177	53.47	
HKPA	Fung Chi-kin	133	40.18	
Independent	So Wai-yin	21	6.35	
Majority		44	13.29	
Total valid votes		331	100.00	
Rejected ballots		6		
Turnout		337	74.89	
Registered electors		450		
Independent gain from Independent		Swing		

=== 1990s ===
1998 Financial Services by-election
Party	Candidate	Votes	%	±%
HKPA	Fung Chi-kin	Unopposed		
HKPA gain from Independent		Swing		

1998 Legislative Council election: Financial Services
Party	Candidate	Votes	%	±%
Independent	Chim Pui-chung	125	40.85	
Independent	Fung Chi-kin	117	38.24	
HKPA	Henry Wu King-cheong	47	15.35	
Independent	Pao Chi-hung	11	5.56	
Majority		8	2.61	
Total valid votes		300	100.00	
Rejected ballots		9		
Turnout		309	80.89	
Registered electors		382		
Independent win (new seat)				

1995 Legislative Council election: Financial Services
Party	Candidate	Votes	%	±%
Independent	Chim Pui-chung	363	59.90	−19.05
Independent	Chan Po-shum	243	40.10	
Majority		120	19.80	
Total valid votes		606	100.00	
Rejected ballots		6		
Turnout		612	68.84	
Registered electors		889		
Independent hold		Swing		

1991 Legislative Council election: Financial Services
Party	Candidate	Votes	%	±%
Independent	Chim Pui-chung	281	47.63	
Independent	Wong Po-ting	200	33.90	
Independent	Cham Yau-tong	59	10.00	
Independent	Chan Po-fun	36	6.10	
Independent	Ka Ting-pong	9	1.53	
Independent	Wong Wun-wing	5	0.85	
Majority		81	13.73	
Turnout		556	80.12	
Registered electors		694		
Independent win (new seat)				
