= Gladys Li =

Hong Kong lawyer and politician

Gladys Veronica Li
- 李志喜
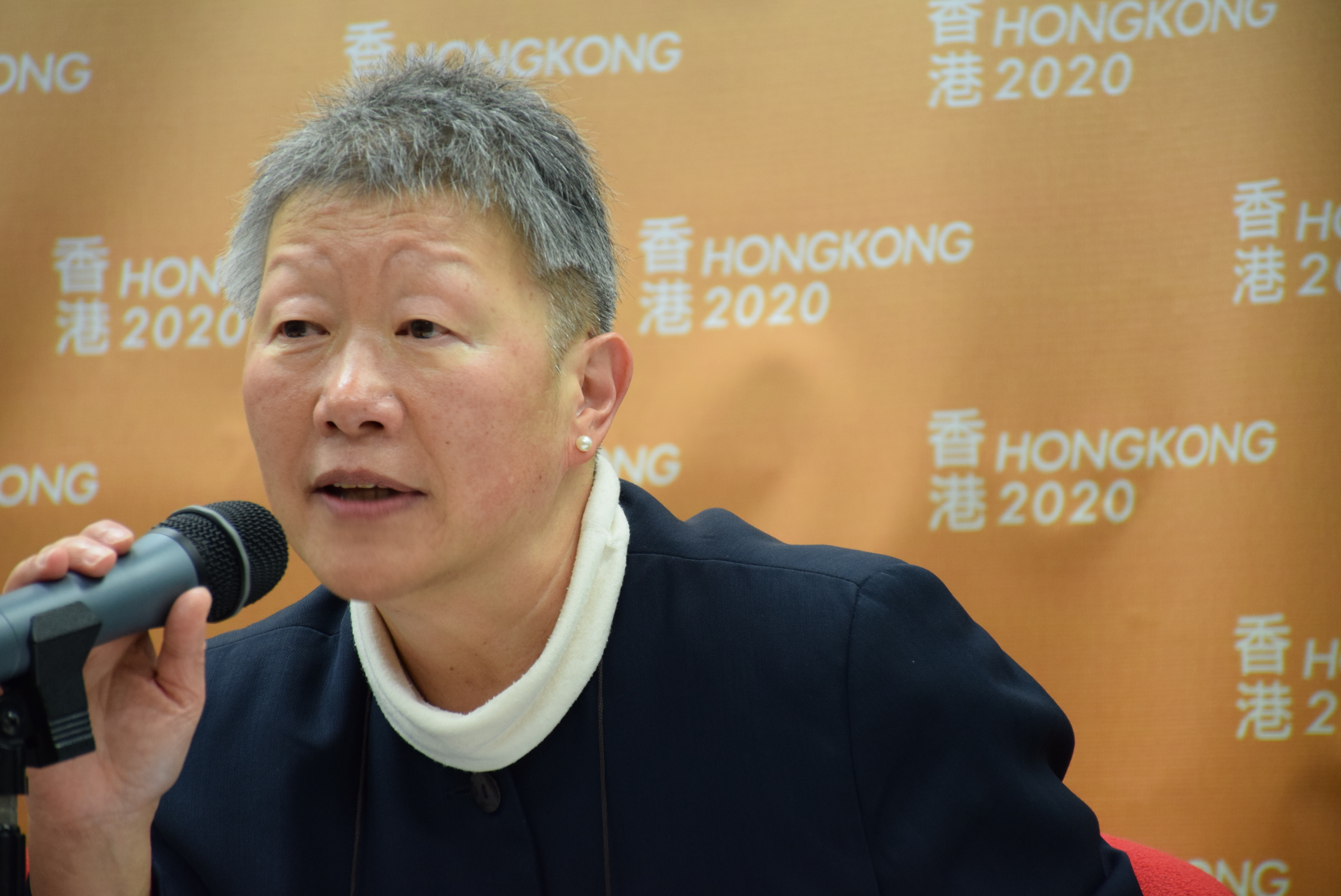
- Born: 1948 (age 77–78); Hong Kong
- Education: University of Cambridge
- Occupation: Barrister
- Organization: Hong Kong Bar Association
- Known for: Constitutional law, human rights advocacy
- Notable work: Vallejos v. Commissioner of Registration (2011)
- Title: Senior Counsel (Hong Kong), Queen's Counsel (England)
- Political party: Civic Party (founding member)

Gladys Veronica Li, QC, SC (Chinese: 李志喜; born 1948), is a former barrister in England, a Senior Counsel at the Hong Kong Bar with practice in constitutional and human rights laws, and a founding member of the Hong Kong Civic Party.

== Career ==
Li began to take an interest in public affairs on her return to Hong Kong in 1982, after 10 years' practice as a barrister in England. She became a member of the lobby group which sought to inform British MPs in the late 1980s about lack of democracy, absence of human rights protections and the importance of the rule of law in Hong Kong. She was Chairman of the Hong Kong Bar Association in 1995 and 1996. Ms Li has also been a member of the Article 23 Concern Group and the Article 45 Concern Group.

In 2011 she successfully represented Filipina domestic helper Evangeline Banao Vallejos in Vallejos v. Commissioner of Registration. Vallejos was seeking permanent residency after working in Hong Kong for 25 years, in a contentious challenge to the Immigration Ordinance that stirred public discussion of human rights in Hong Kong and vilification for Li. However, the CFI's decision was overturned by the Court of Appeal in 2012 and Vallejos's appeal was dismissed by the Court of Final Appeal in 2013.

== Family ==
Li's parents are mother Marie Veronica Lillian Yang and father is Simon Li Fook-sean, a former senior judge who is part of the Li family that owns the Bank of East Asia and who stood as a candidate for Hong Kong Chief Executive in the first CE election in 1996.
