= Chinese Gold and Silver Exchange Society =

Hong Kong organisation of gold trading firms

- Traditional Chinese: 金銀業貿易場
Transcriptions
Standard Mandarin
- Hanyu Pinyin: Jīnyínyè Màoyìchǎng
Yue: Cantonese
- Yale Romanization: Gāmngàhnyihp Mauhyihkchèuhng

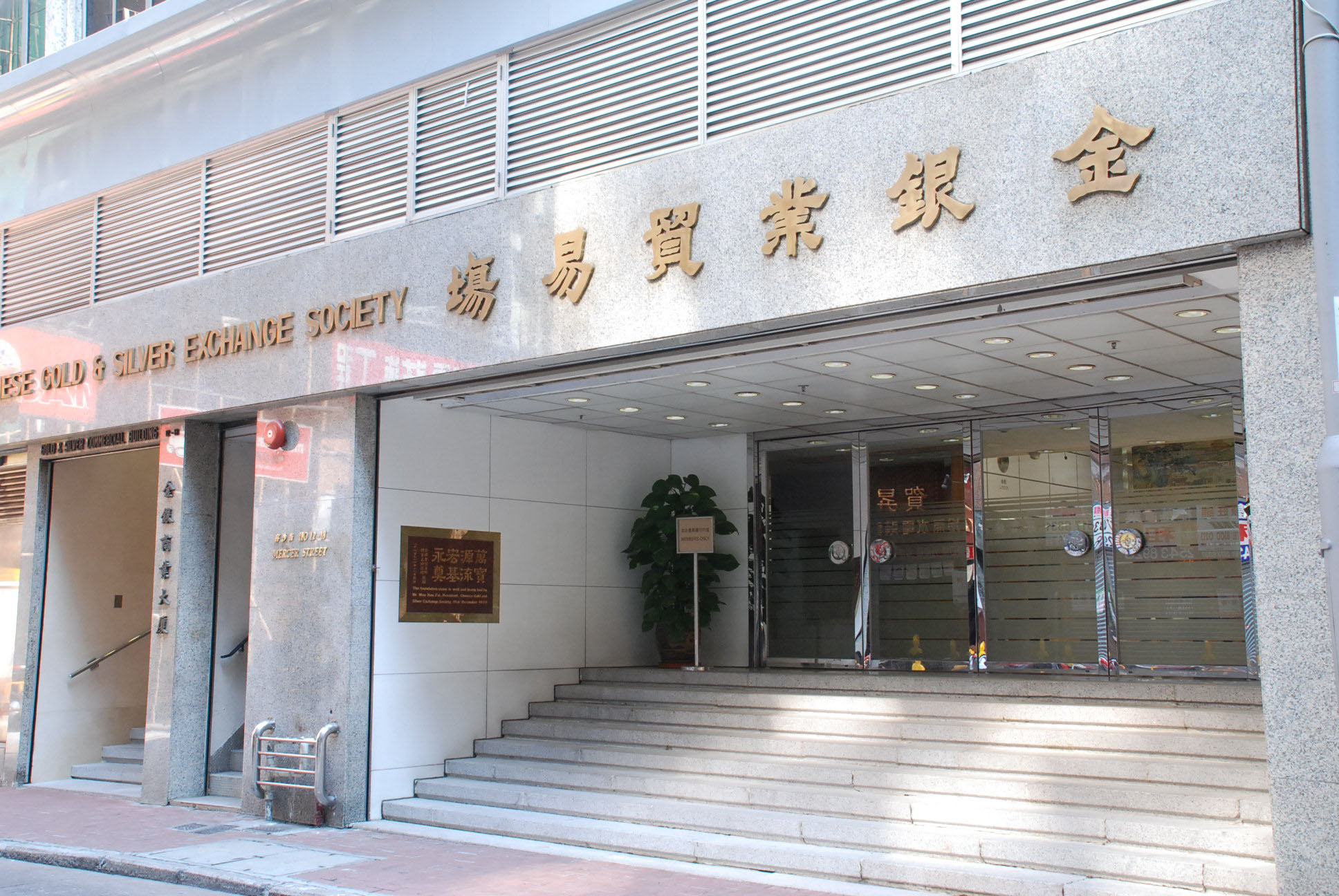
Chinese Gold and Silver Exchange headquarters

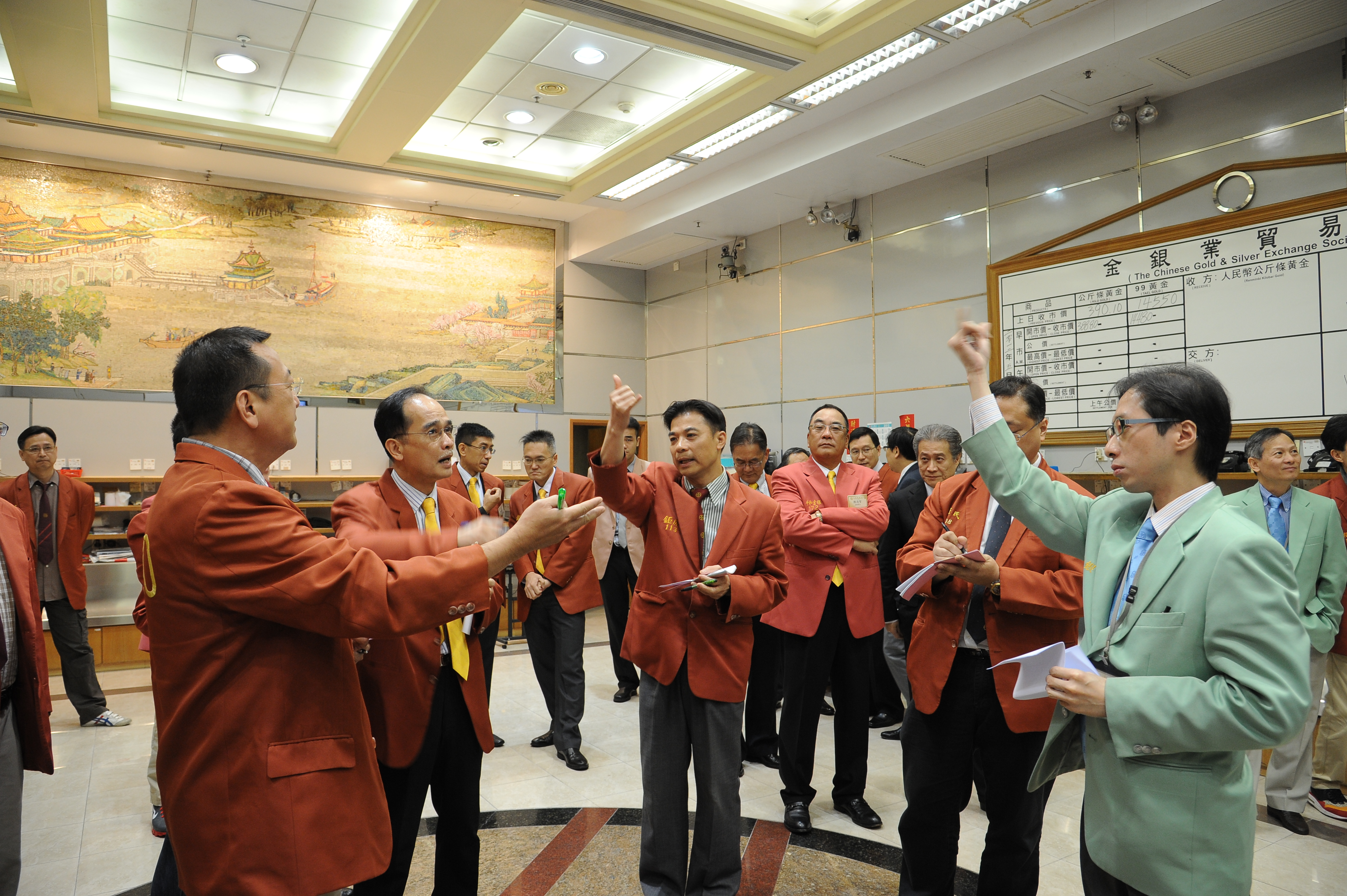
Open outcry method

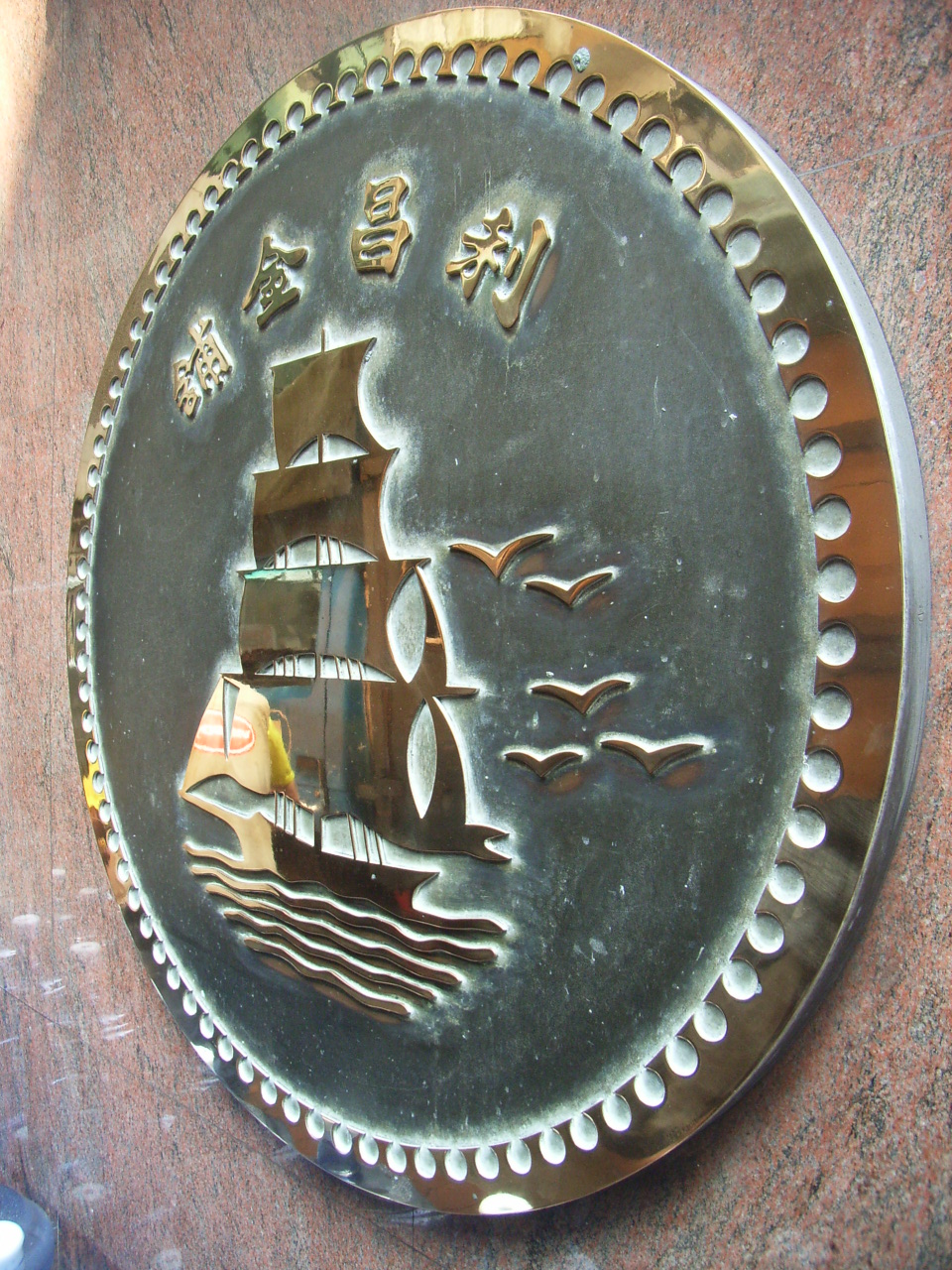
Logo of CGSES member firm Lee Cheong Gold Dealers on their shop at Bonham Strand, Sheung Wan

The Chinese Gold and Silver Exchange Society (CGSE; 金銀業貿易場) is an organisation of gold trading firms in Hong Kong who are participants of the Chinese Gold and Silver Exchange, the first exchange in Hong Kong.

The Chinese Gold and Silver Exchange was established in 1910 and has a history of more than 110 years. CGSE is amongst the few Exchange in the world that has both an open outcry and an electronic precious metals trading platform. It is Hong Kong's only physical gold and silver exchange approved by the government under the laws of Hong Kong in Article 3(d) of Chapter 82.

The CGSE has 171 corporate members from the precious metals industry representing key stakeholders, which include banks, large jeweler groups, bullion merchants, gold refineries, and financial institutions. The role of CGSE is to provide its members with a venue to facilitate precious metal trading activities and member advisory.

== History ==
The CGSES was formally established as an organisation in 1910. Its founders were immigrants from mainland China. It eventually stopped trading silver, but gold trading saw significant growth after 1974 when the government loosened legal restrictions, and by 1979 trading volume was roughly one million ounces per day, making it one of the world's four largest gold trading centres along with London, New York City, and Zurich.

The history of CGSE has been a long and intriguing, dated back to 1910 when it was called the "Gold and Silver Exchange Company" and rename as Chinese Gold and Silver Exchange Society ("CGSE") in 1918. In the formative years, a group of banks, notable mentions, Hang Seng Bank Limited and Tai Seng Bank Limited, assembled a place to provide trading for precious metals and foreign currencies, then later fundraised to build a recognized Exchange that outgrowth the money industry in Hong Kong.

Besides its principal business of trading gold and silver, CGSE concurrently engaged in dealing of 89 fine gold, silver dollar in pre-WWII time, and US Dollar, Japanese Yen, Vietnamese Dong, Filipino Peso and Mexican gold nugget in post-WWII time.

CGSE experienced ups and downs, such as unstable war times, political riots, and fluctuating gold prices, yet the sheer strength was displayed since the 19th century. Noteworthy mentioned was, in January 1980, during the Soviet Union invaded Afghanistan. The one-day high and low gold prices reached a difference of HK$1,200.00. That day, major gold markets in the world were all suspended, but CGSE was the only gold market in the world that remained open.

A similar situation arises in early February of 1983, during the plummeting oil prices, tightening of the US Federal Reserve's monetary policy, and rising interest rates, and highly volatile gold prices, ultimately leading to the suspension of gold trading in the US and Singapore markets, yet CGSE was still opened.

CGSE has a long tradition of donations and charity services dated back to 1940s. It started in 1948 where the Exchange constructed of a Kam Ngan Swimming Shed for the industry workers and public use, which was closed during the government land reclamation, a few years later. A school was founded in 1949 that offers complimentary educational services for children, including complete subsidies of school tuitions, book supplies, stationeries and lunch meals.

In March 1967, it was approved by the Department of Education and transferred to a government-subsidized school called Po Leung Kuk Gold and Silver Exchange Society Pershing Tsang School. Later in 1952, a clinic called The Chinese Gold & Silver Exchange Society Clinic was founded to provide outpatient healthcare services. The clinic provides gynaecology and night clinics, dentistry, X-rays, various pathological analysis and laboratory tests, electrocardiogram electrotherapy machines and other types of equipment to its members.

Until today, the Hong Kong Government and CGSE have maintained a mutually respectful and cooperative relationship. CGSE is also the sole exchange in Hong Kong which trades physical gold and silver and operates in pursuance of section 3 of Chapter 82 of Laws of Hong Kong, under which its operation as a commodity exchange is legally exempted.

== In politics ==
Members of the CGSES entitled to vote at its general meetings are one of two categories of persons eligible to register as Financial Services functional constituency electors, the other being exchange participants of Hong Kong Exchanges and Clearing. This gives them the right to elect a representative to the Legislative Council, as well seats in the Election Committee.

== See also ==
- Gold as an investment
- Silver as an investment
