= Scientia Secondary School =

Secondary school in Ho Man Tin, Hong Kong

- 創知中學
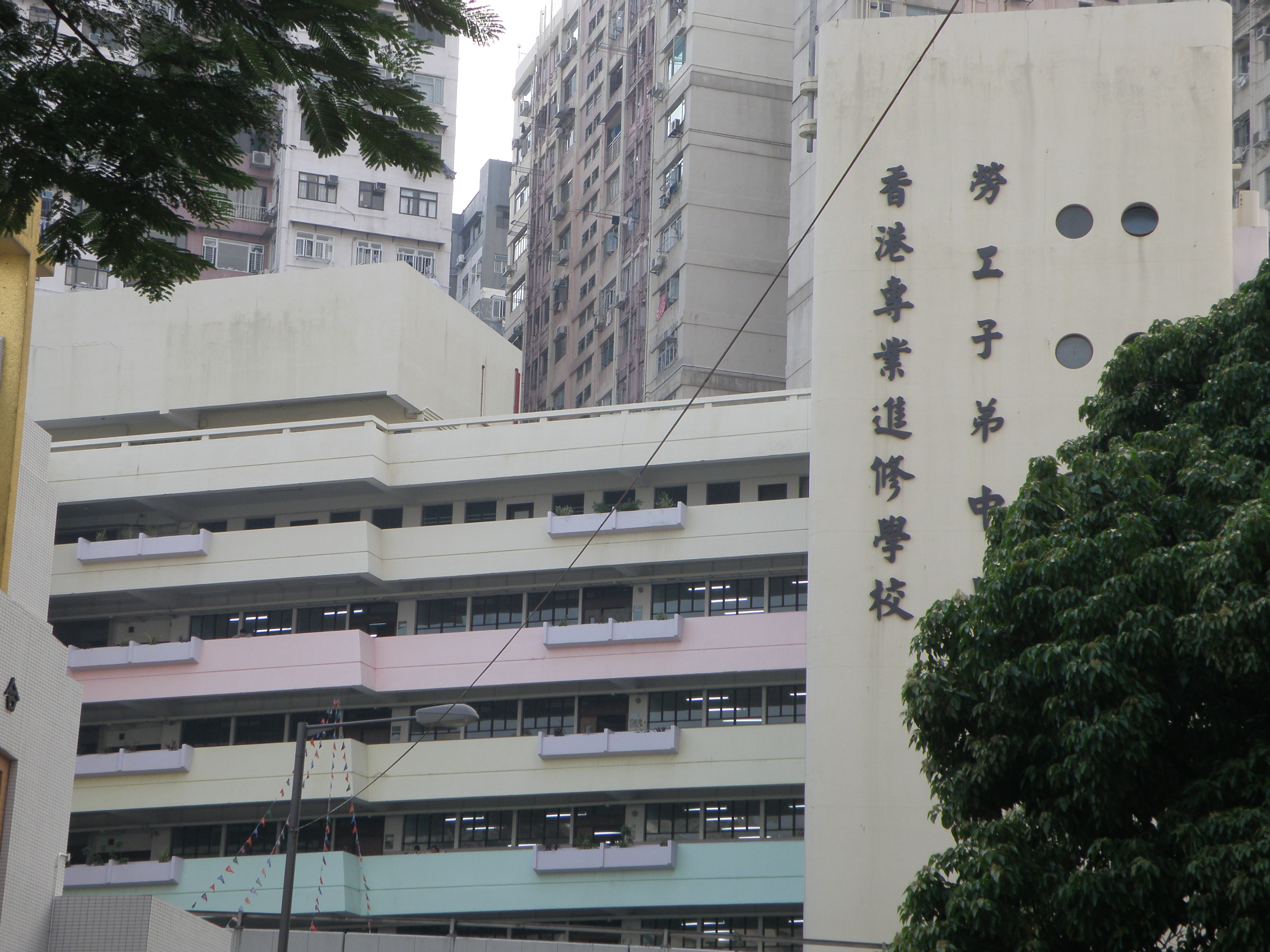
- School exterior

Location
- 14 Princess Margaret Road; Ho Man Tin, Kowloon; Hong Kong; 22.3199°N 114.1788°E

Information
- Type: Direct Subsidy Scheme
- Motto: Proactive, Sincere, Inquisitive, Creative
- Established: 1946
- Principal: Wong Ching Yung
- Faculty: 48 teachers
- Enrolment: 700 (approx.)
- Website: wss.edu.hk

Scientia Secondary School (Chinese: 創知中學) is a secondary school in Ho Man Tin, Kowloon, Hong Kong.

It was formerly called Workers' Children Secondary School (Chinese: 勞工子弟中學) and, before that, Mongkok Workers' Children School (Chinese: 旺角勞工子弟學校).

== History ==
=== Establishment ===
In 1946 the missionary bishop Ronald Hall proposed to various trade unions that they should band together to form a society for the education of workers' children. The "Education Advancement Society for the Children of Workers in Hongkong and Kowloon" was thus formed. The society opened seven schools in 1947, at Mong Kok, Wan Chai, Apliu Street (Sham Shui Po), Hing Man Street (Shau Kei Wan), Sai Wan Ho, Jaffe Road, and Portland Street. The Mongkok school was housed in government premises and had 556 students in April 1947. More schools opened in 1948. These schools were often not in permanent premises but in rented flats. The government was still working to rehabilitate schools ruined during the Japanese occupation of World War II.

A few years after opening, the original Mongkok school was closed by the government, which felt that the workers' children schools were operating in unsuitable premises. The government planned to build new government schools in both Hong Kong Island and Kowloon and withdraw the subsidy given to the education advancement society. However, the Mong Kok school continued operating. A new school campus was built at Nairn Road (now called Princess Margaret Road) in Ho Man Tin. It was formally opened with a commemorative ceremony on 29 April 1951. The school was founded as a kindergarten, and the primary section was added soon after. The lower secondary section was founded in 1961.

=== 1960s disturbances ===
Mongkok Workers' Children School was regarded as a leftist institution. It was the site of discord during the 1967 riots, inspired by the contemporaneous fervour of the Cultural Revolution in China. In May 1967, at the outset of the disturbances, it was reported in the South China Morning Post that men dressed as Red Guards, claiming to have come from Canton, were seen shouting communist slogans outside the school. In October 1967 one of the teachers, Li Mou-lan, was tried and subsequently convicted of possessing inflammatory posters and recommended for deportation back to China, his birthplace. The same month a student of the school was accused of possessing a bomb.

Following a bomb explosion at the Chung Wah Middle School, which was subsequently shut down by the government, the Mongkok Workers' Children School was among four other "communist-run" schools raided by police on 28 November 1967. It was believed that the schools were being used for bomb-making. When the police arrived, students began shouting slogans and throwing objects and furniture at the officers. The headmistress, Lam Suk-ching, was accused by the police of directing others to attack the officers. The police heard "minor explosions" and saw smoke during the raid, and used tear gas shells to quell the disturbance. During the raid 16 people, including the headmistress, were arrested and later charged with obstructing the police and making inflammatory speeches.

=== Modern developments ===
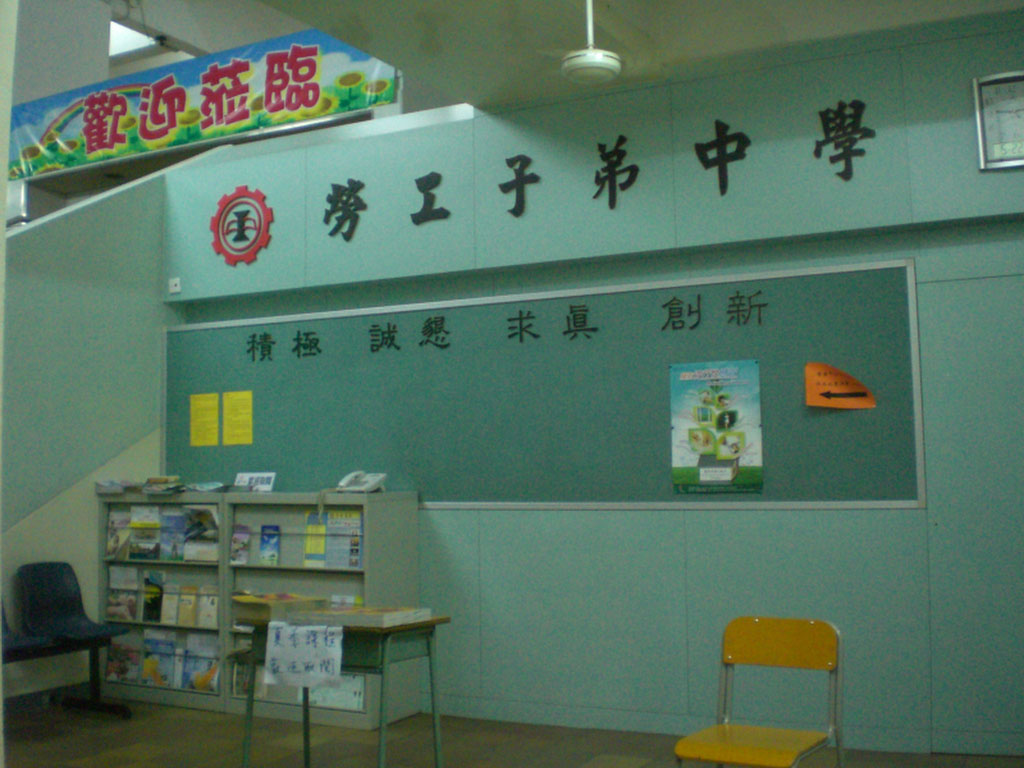
Interior view

The upper secondary section was founded in 1975. In the 1980s the Mongkok Workers' Children School moved toward becoming a more mainstream institution. It participated in the Hong Kong Certificate of Education Examination (HKCEE) for the first time in 1980. It was among several leftist schools that lobbied for government subsidy from the mid-1980s. The Hong Kong Government launched the Direct Subsidy Scheme (DSS) in 1991 to provide grants to private schools. The Mongkok Workers' Children School, previously classified as a Private Independent School (PIS), was one of nine schools that joined the DSS at the outset.

The school was the 1996 champion of the Hong Kong Mathematics Olympiad.

== Description ==
The school is a co-ed institution founded in 1946. It is a Direct Subsidy Scheme school sponsored by the Hong Kong Workers' Educational Organisation Ltd. There are about 700 students, taught by 48 teachers.

The school campus on Princess Margaret Road comprises about 5,190 square metres (55,900 sq ft) of floor space. It comprises classrooms, two computer labs, an auditorium, a library, four laboratories, and two outdoor basketball courts. It is air conditioned.

== Notable alumni ==
- Lo Suk-ching, former LegCo member

== See also ==
- List of secondary schools in Hong Kong
