= Chim Pui-chung =

Hong Kong politician

- 詹培忠
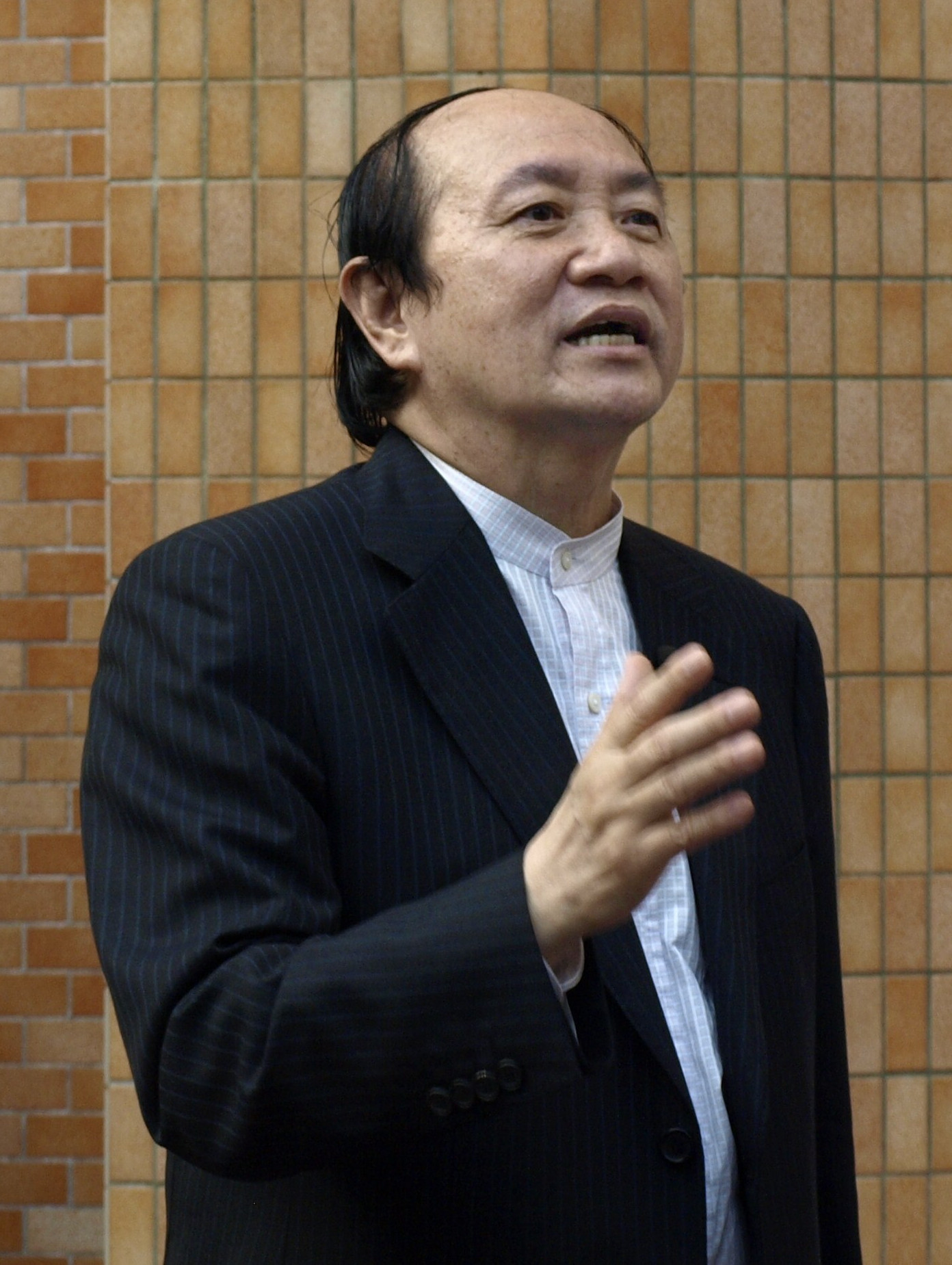
- Chim in 2008

Member of the Legislative Council of Hong Kong
- In office 9 October 1991 – 30 June 1997
- Preceded by: New constituency
- Succeeded by: Replaced by Provisional Legislative Council
- Constituency: Financial Services
- In office 21 December 1996 – 30 June 1998 (Provisional Legislative Council)
- In office 1 July 1998 – 9 September 1998
- Preceded by: New parliament
- Succeeded by: Fung Chi-kin
- Constituency: Financial Services
- In office 1 October 2004 – 30 September 2012
- Preceded by: Henry Wu
- Succeeded by: Christopher Cheung
- Constituency: Financial Services

Personal details
- Born: 24 September 1946 (age 79) Chaozhou, Guangdong, China
- Spouse: Ly Kim-chau
- Occupation: Company director
- Nickname: Angry Man from Teochew (潮州怒漢)

Chinese name
- Chinese: 詹培忠
Transcriptions
Standard Mandarin
- Hanyu Pinyin: Zhān Péizhōng
Yue: Cantonese
- Jyutping: Zim^{1} Pui^{4}-zung^{1}
Southern Min
- Teochew Peng'im: Ziam^{1} Buê^{5}-dong^{1}

Chim Pui-chung (born 1946 in Chaozhou, Guangdong, China) served a member of the Legislative Council of Hong Kong (LegCo), representing the Financial Services Functional Constituency. He is director of several companies.

== Political career ==
Chim was a legislative councillor from 1991 until he was jailed for conspiring to forge documents in 1998, whereupon he was impeached and disqualified as a legislator by Legco. He was released from prison in 1999. In 2004, he was re-elected unopposed as legislative councillor for the financial services constituency. In 2008 he was again elected.

In 2005, he was an unsuccessful candidate in the Hong Kong Chief Executive election, receiving only 21 nominations from the Election Committee, less than the minimum requirement of 100. As a result, Donald Tsang was declared the uncontested winner.

== Career ==
In November 2021, he was charged with fraud, along with his son, Ricky Chim Kim-lun, and Wong Pei Li.

== Family ==
His son, Ricky Chim Kim-lun, is a member of the Election Committee and is also an honorary consul of Papua New Guinea.

Legislative Council of Hong Kong
New constituency	Member of Legislative Council; Representative for Financial Services; 1991–1997	Replaced by Provisional Legislative Council
New parliament	Member of Provisional Legislative Council; 1997–1998	Replaced by Legislative Council
New parliament	Member of Legislative Council; Representative for Financial Services; 1998	Succeeded by Fung Chi-kin
Preceded by Henry Wu	Member of Legislative Council; Representative for Financial Services; 2004–2012	Succeeded by Christopher Cheung
