= Chung Wah Middle School =

Former school in Mid-Levels, Hong Kong

- 中華中學
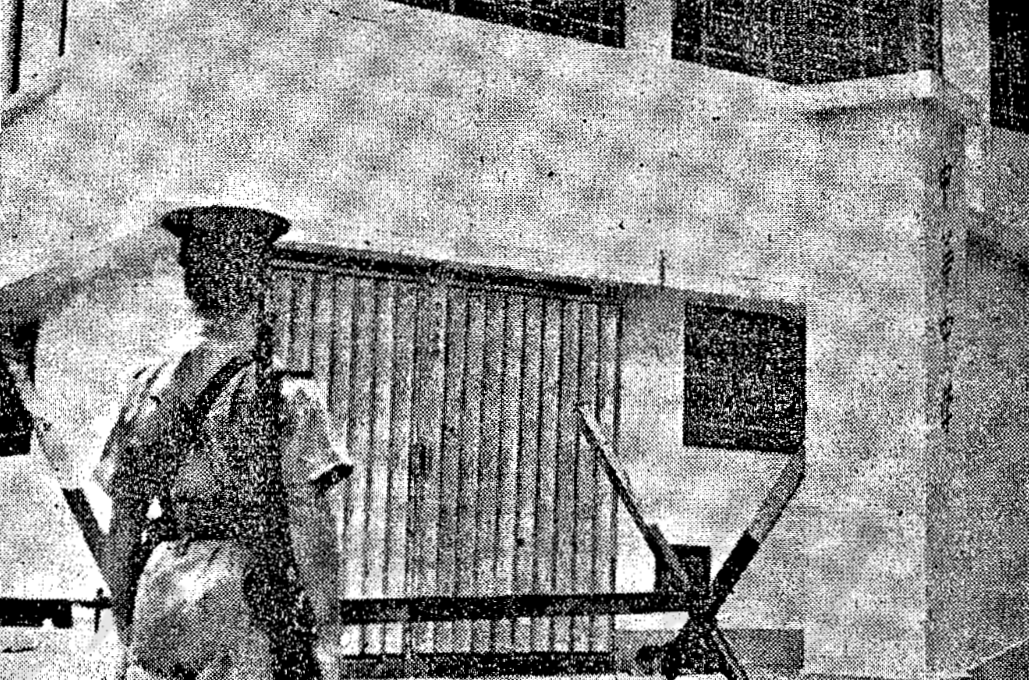
- The school is cordoned off by the police after government ordered to shut down during 1967 riots

Location
- 1 Chico Terrace; Mid-Levels, Hong Kong
- 22.2807°N 114.1513°E

Information
- Opened: 1926
- Closed: 1967
- Principal: Wong Cho-fun (at closure)

Chung Wah Middle School (Chinese: 中華中學) was a leftist school located at 1 Chico Terrace, Mid-Levels, Hong Kong. It opened in 1926 and was shut down by the British Hong Kong government for its involvement in the 1967 riots. Following the 1997 Handover, some school alumni went on to serve as high-ranking officials in the new government.

== History ==
The school was founded by Wong Lan-koon, a grandfather of Elsie Leung.

On 16 October 1967, police raided the school and seized more than 3,500 inflammatory posters. On 27 November, two explosions were reported at the school, with one student seriously injured in the school laboratory. Residents in the area and police alleged that the school was being used as a bomb factory. The injured student, 18-year-old Siu Wai-man, lost a part of his left hand. He was charged with possession of explosive substances and sentenced to four years in prison.

The day after the explosions, four other pro-communist schools were raided by police for suspected bomb-making, namely the Heung To Middle School, Hon Wah Middle School, Fukien Middle School, and the Mongkok Workers' Children School.

Following the explosions, the school was immediately shut down by the government. In mid-1968, the government de-registered the school under the Education Ordinance on the grounds that it had been "willfully used for the unlawful manufacture and storage of dangerous explosive substances".

In late-1968, it was reported in the South China Morning Post that all former students of Chung Wah Middle School had transferred to Hon Wah Middle School.

== Notable alumni ==
- Elsie Leung – the first Secretary for Justice of the HKSAR
- Tung Chee-hwa – the first Chief Executive of the HKSAR

== See also ==
- List of secondary schools in Hong Kong
