= Christopher Cheung =

Hong Kong politician

The Honourable Christopher Cheung Wah-fung JP
- 張華峰
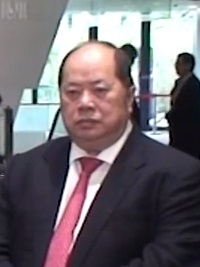

Member of the Legislative Council
- In office 1 October 2012 – 31 December 2021
- Preceded by: Chim Pui-chung
- Succeeded by: Robert Lee
- Constituency: Financial Services

Personal details
- Born: May 2, 1952 (age 74) Fujian, China
- Party: DAB (quit); BPA
- Education: Pui Kiu Middle School; City University of Hong Kong
- Occupation: Securities Dealer

Christopher Cheung
- Traditional Chinese: 張華峰
Transcriptions
Yue: Cantonese
- Yale Romanization: Jēung Wàh fūng
- Jyutping: Zoeng^{1} Waa^{4} fung^{1}

Christopher Cheung Wah-fung, JP (Chinese: 張華峰, born 2 May 1952 in Fujian, China) is the founder and chief executive officer of Christfund Securities and a former member of the Legislative Council of Hong Kong representing the Financial Services constituency.

== Background ==
Cheung founded Christfund in 1980, which was re-organised as Christfund Securities Limited in 1987. He began serving in the Election Committee for Financial Services constituency. Between 1997 and 2000, Cheung was a councillor for the Hong Kong Stock Exchange. Beginning in 2003, he was a non-executive director in multiple holding limited companies including Fuijian Holding, Tongda Financial, and First China Financial. He was an observer for the Independent Police Complaints Council in Hong Kong until 2007.

In 2012, Cheung was elected a member of Legislative Council of Hong Kong, representing the Financial Services functional constituency. He retained his seat in the 2016 election, securing 51 percent of the 507 votes cast.

In November 2020, while Chief Executive Carrie Lam was giving her Annual Policy speech, Cheung was filmed not paying attention and texting someone to arrange the pickup of HK$9,600 worth of hairy crabs by his driver.

== Honours ==
In 2000, Cheung was appointed as Justice of Peace by Tung Chee Hwa.

Legislative Council of Hong Kong
| Preceded by Chim Pui-chung | Member of Legislative Council; Representative for Financial Services; 2012–2021 | Succeeded by Robert Lee |
Order of precedence
| Preceded by Dennis Kwok; Member of the Legislative Council | Hong Kong order of precedence Member of the Legislative Council | Succeeded by Fernando Cheung; Member of the Legislative Council |
