= Huaxia Art Centre =

Arts centre in Shenzhen, China

Coordinates: 22.5345°N 113.9853°E

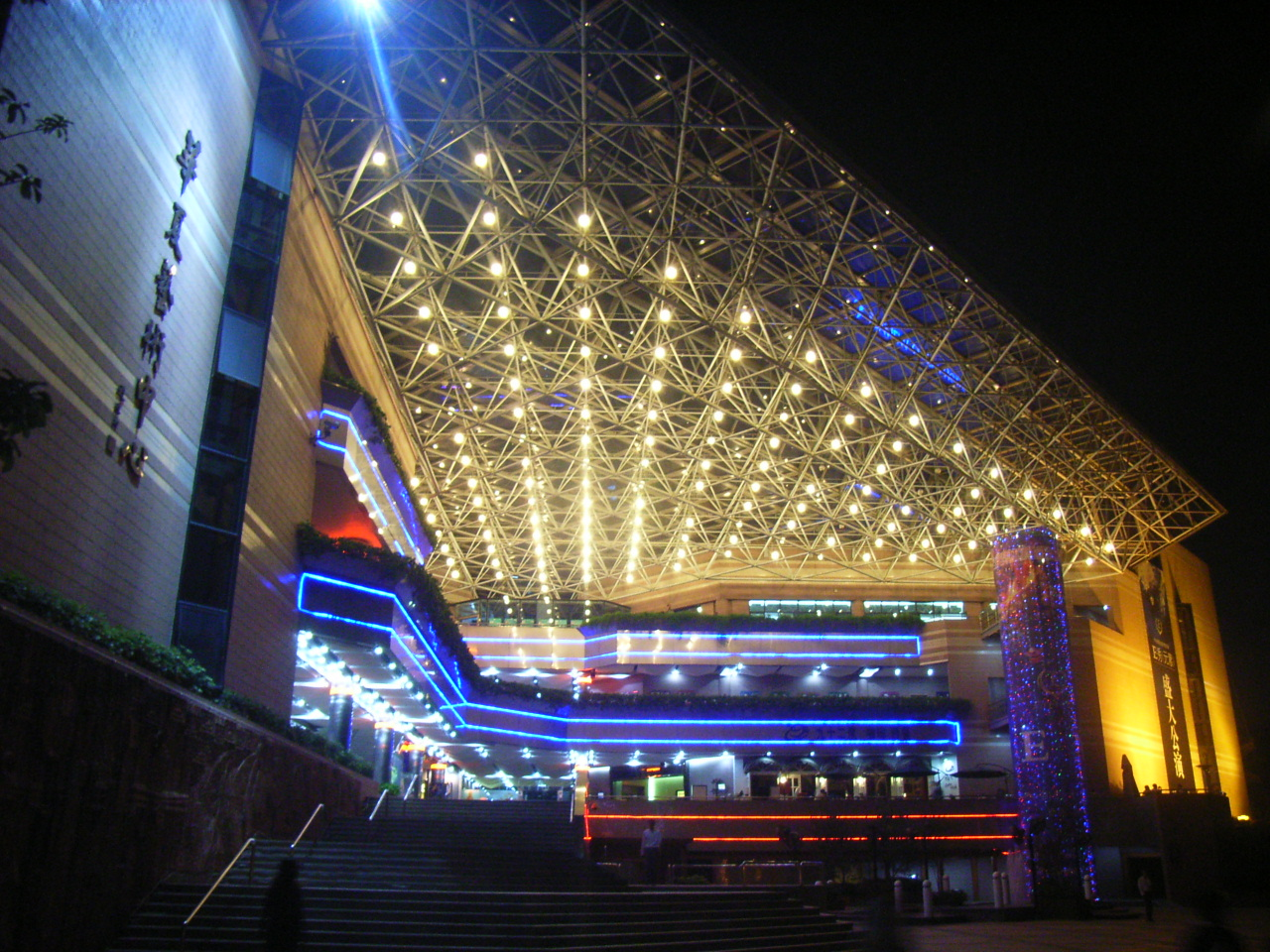
The Huaxia Arts Centre at night

Huaxia Art Centre is a facility for art and culture located on the outskirts of the Overseas Chinese Town in the Nanshan District, Shenzhen City, Guangdong Province, China.

The 13,500-square-metre (145,000 sq ft) centre was completed in 1990 and opened in 1991. It has since hosted a variety of large national and international conferences, exhibitions, and artistic and cultural events.

From February to June 1997, it hosted the Provisional Legislative Council of Hong Kong.

The centre underwent renovations between May 2004 to March 2005 to replace seats and add film studios.
