= Preliminary Working Committee =

The Preliminary Working Committee (PWC) was a body set up by the Government of the People's Republic of China government for the preparation of the transfer of sovereignty over Hong Kong.

The first meeting of the PWC was held in July 1995 and ended its work in December 1995. It consisted of 57 members, of which 30 were from Hong Kong. The chairman was Qian Qichen and the six vice-chairmen consisted of four mainland officials (Lu Ping, Zhou Nan, Jiang Enzhu, and Zheng Yi), two Hong Kong vice-chairmen were Henry Fok and T. K. Ann, two tycoons among the most trusted by Beijing. The mainland members included those with vice-ministerial rank form the Ministry of Foreign Affairs, Hong Kong and Macao Affairs Office, Ministry of Public Security, People's Liberation Army, Ministry of Foreign Trade and Economic Cooperation, People's Bank of China, and the CCP's United Front Work Department. Other Hong Kong members included those were the targets of the united front, such as David Li, Li Ka-shing, Lo Tak-shing, and Maria Tam.

The legality of the body was questioned as the forming of such a body was not envisaged by either the Sino-British Joint Declaration or the Basic Law of Hong Kong. Beijing argued it was the decision made by the National People's Congress on 4 April 1990 when the Basic Law was passed, it provided the NPC to establish a Preparatory Committee for the Hong Kong Special Administrative Region and the Preliminary Working Committee was just preparation for the Preparatory Committee to be set up in 1996.

== See also ==
- Preparatory Committee for the Hong Kong Special Administrative Region
- Transfer of sovereignty over Hong Kong
