= Fung Chi-kin =

The Honourable Fung Chi-kin
- 馮志堅

Member of the Legislative Council of Hong Kong
- In office 1998–2000
- Preceded by: Chim Pui-chung
- Succeeded by: Henry Wu
- Constituency: Financial Services

Personal details
- Born: 9 June 1949 (age 76)
- Party: None
- Spouse: Kwan Po-yin
- Occupation: Securities dealer
- Profession: Legislative Councillor

Fung Chi-kin (born 9 June 1949, Hong Kong) is a Hong Kong politician. He was a member of the Legislative Council of Hong Kong for Financial Services in 1998 and 2000, substituting for Chim Pui-chung who was jailed for conspiring to forge documents and was impeached and disqualified as a legislator by Legco.

Legislative Council of Hong Kong
Preceded by Chim Pui-chung	Member of Legislative Council; Representative for Financial Services; 1998–2000	Succeeded by Henry Wu
