= Tung Chee-hwa =

Hong Kong politician and businessman (1937–2026)

The Honourable Tung Chee-hwa GBM
- 董建華
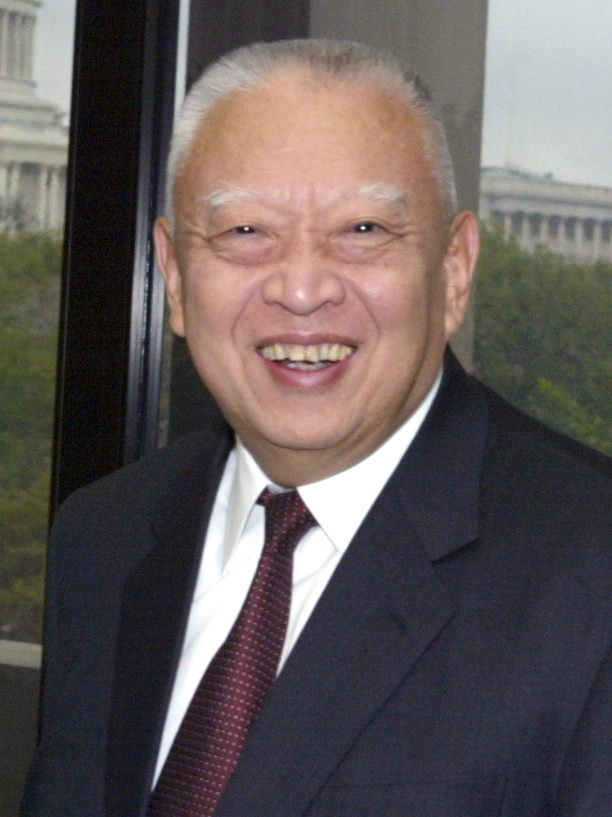
- Tung in 2005

1st Chief Executive of Hong Kong
- In office 1 July 1997 – 12 March 2005
- President: Jiang Zemin; Hu Jintao
- Premier: Li Peng; Zhu Rongji; Wen Jiabao
- Preceded by: Office established Chris Patten (as Governor of Hong Kong)
- Succeeded by: Donald Tsang

Vice Chairman of the Chinese People's Political Consultative Conference
- In office 12 March 2005 – 10 March 2023
- Chairman: Jia Qinglin; Yu Zhengsheng; Wang Yang

Member of the Executive Council of Hong Kong
- In office 7 October 1992 – 3 June 1996
- Appointed by: Chris Patten

Personal details
- Born: 7 July 1937 Xuhui, Shanghai, China
- Died: 8 September 2026 (aged 89) Happy Valley, Hong Kong
- Spouse: Betty Tung (m. 1961)
- Children: 3
- Education: Chung Wah Middle School; University of Liverpool (BS)
- Occupation: Politician; businessman

Chinese name
- Traditional Chinese: 董建華
- Simplified Chinese: 董建华
Transcriptions
Standard Mandarin
- Hanyu Pinyin: Dǒng Jiànhuá
- IPA: [tʊ̀ŋ tɕjɛ̂n.xwǎ]
Wu
- Romanization: Ton Cie Wa
Hakka
- Romanization: Dung^{3} Gien^{4} Fa^{2}
Yue: Cantonese
- Yale Romanization: Dúng Gin wàh
- Jyutping: Dung^{2} Gin^{3} Waa^{4}
- IPA: [tʊ̌ŋ kīːn wȁː]

Tung Chee-hwa (Chinese: 董建華; 7 July 1937 – 8 September 2026) was a Hong Kong businessman and politician who served as the first Chief Executive of Hong Kong between 1997 and 2005, upon the transfer of sovereignty on 1 July. He served as a vice-chairman of the Chinese People's Political Consultative Conference (CPPCC) between 2005 and 2023.

Born as the eldest son of Chinese shipping magnate Tung Chao Yung, who founded Orient Overseas Container Line (OOCL), Tung took over the family business after his father's death in 1981. Four years later, OOCL teetered on the edge of bankruptcy, and the business was saved by the People's Republic of China government through Henry Fok in 1986.

Tung was appointed as an unofficial member of the Executive Council of Hong Kong by last British Governor Chris Patten in 1992 and was tipped as Beijing's favourite as the first Chief Executive of the Hong Kong SAR. In 1996, he was elected the Chief Executive by a 400-member Selection Committee. His government was embroiled in a series of crises, including the bird flu and the 1997 Asian financial crisis. In 2002, he was re-elected without competition. In 2003, more than 500,000 protesters demanded Tung step down in the light of the proposed legislation of the Hong Kong Basic Law Article 23 and the SARS outbreak. Tung resigned in the middle of his second term on 10 March 2005.

After his resignation, he was appointed vice chairman of the Chinese People's Political Consultative Conference by the Beijing government and formed the China-United States Exchange Foundation (CUSEF) in 2008 to influence public opinion towards China in the United States. In 2014, he founded a think tank Our Hong Kong Foundation consisting of the membership of numerous leading tycoons. He remained influential in Hong Kong politics and was dubbed as a "kingmaker".

== Background ==
Tung was born in Xuhui District, Shanghai, on 7 July 1937, the 29th day of the fifth lunar month in 1937 in the Chinese calendar, into the influential shipping magnate family of Tung Chao-yung. Tung Chao-yung was the founder of the Orient Overseas Container Line, a shipping company which was closely associated with the government of the Republic of China. Tung Chee-hwa's younger brother, Tung Chee-chen, was ranked as the 23rd wealthiest man in Hong Kong in 2009, worth US$900 million. In January 2008, Tung and his family were ranked (also by Forbes) as the 16th wealthiest in Hong Kong, with a total value of US$3 billion.

In 1949 during the Chinese Communist Revolution, when Tung was 12 years old, Tung's father moved the family to Hong Kong. In the 1950s, Tung attended the Chung Wah Middle School, a leftist school later shut down by the Hong Kong colonial government in the light of the 1967 Hong Kong riots. He was sent abroad to study at Liverpool University, leaving him with a lifelong passion for the Liverpool Football Club. He graduated from the university with a Bachelor of Science degree in marine engineering in 1960. From Liverpool he was sent to the United States to work as an engineer at General Electric in Massachusetts, and then for the family business in New York. He also lived in San Francisco before he returned to Hong Kong in 1969.

All of Tung's children hold American citizenship.

== Early business and political career ==
Tung joined his father's business upon his return to Hong Kong in 1969 and gradually took over the leadership of the family enterprise. He took over his family business in 1982 when his father died. However, in 1985, his company was heavily in debt and teetered on the edge of bankruptcy. Henry Fok, a pro-Beijing businessman, took initiative and helped Tung's family, with the support of the Chinese Communist Party (CCP).

He became close to the Communist authorities in Beijing afterward, especially with Jiang Zemin, former General Secretary of the Chinese Communist Party, who had risen to power surrounded by his "Shanghai clique"; Tung was able to be associated with them because he was from the nearby city of Ningbo, Zhejiang, and had lived and worked in Shanghai for a while.

Tung was a member from 1985 to 1990 of the Basic Law Consultative Committee, responsible for the drafting of the Basic Law of Hong Kong. In 1993, he was appointed to the Chinese People's Political Consultative Conference, the top advisory body of the People's Republic of China.

Under the consensus between the British and People's Republic of China governments, Tung, who until then had remained a low profile in politics, was appointed in 1992 by the last British Governor, Chris Patten, to the Executive Council of Hong Kong, the highest advisory body in the colonial government. In 1996 he left office to run in the first Chief Executive election.

Before the election, he received a warm handshake from Jiang Zemin who crossed a crowded room to single out Tung, which was seen as a sign of his being regarded as Beijing's choice for the Chief Executive. Tung employed three "isms" in his election campaign, namely Confucianism, elitism and nationalism. On 11 December 1996, he was elected by a 400-member Selection Committee, receiving 320 votes and defeating former Hong Kong Chief Justice Yang Ti-liang and tycoon Peter Woo. All three candidates were of Shanghainese descent. He was sworn in as the first Chief Executive of Hong Kong Special Administrative Region on the day of transfer of sovereignty on 1 July 1997.

== Chief Executive ==
=== First term ===
In early 1997, Tung saw his victory in the first Chief Executive election, in the voting conducted by 400 committees of the electoral college whose members are appointed by the PRC Government.

Tung with U.S. President Bill Clinton in 1998

The government pledged to focus on three policy areas: housing, the elderly, and education. Measures on housing included a pledge to provide 85,000 housing flats each year so as to resolve the problems of soaring property prices. The Asian financial crisis that hit Hong Kong in the months after Tung took office made this objective almost immediately redundant and, in fact, it was a collapse in property prices that became a far more pressing problem in the years between 1998 and 2002.

After being appointed by the State Council of China, Tung took office on 1 July 1997. His first term was significantly – and negatively – impacted by the Asian financial crisis and there was criticism by the general public of his style of governance. Job losses and plummeting values in the stock and property markets, combined with controversial economic policies (which were called crony capitalism at the time), the people of Hong Kong started to question Tung and the HKSAR government.

During Tung's first term the government proposed a number of controversial infrastructure and reformation projects including technology park, a science park, a Chinese medicine centre and the Disney theme park. Tung's decisions were somewhat questioned by the central government, including Jiang Zemin, former General Secretary of the Chinese Communist Party.

Questions arose over Tung's decision to grant the Cyberport Project to Richard Li, son of tycoon Li Ka-shing, without the benefit of an open tender.

The way in which the Walt Disney Company's land grant for its theme park on a 50-year lease apparently disrupted the market, and for studying the possibility of setting up a casino in Hong Kong. His administration was seen as troubled, particularly during the confusion of the first days of the new airport, the mis-handling of the avian influenza epidemic, declining standards due to education reforms (specifically teaching in the Cantonese "mother tongue" and mandatory English examination for teachers), the right of abode issue, and his disagreement of political views with the popular then Chief Secretary, Anson Chan. Tung's popularity plummeted with the economy, to 47% satisfaction at the end of August 2002.

=== Second term ===
Tung, with nominations from 714 members of the electoral college, was uncontested in the election for a second term, as according to the Chief Executive Election Ordinance, nominations from at least 100 members of the 800-strong electoral college are required for each candidate.

==== Accountability system ====
In an attempt to resolve the difficulties in governance, Tung reformed the structure of government substantially starting from his second term in 2002. In a system popularly called the Principal Officials Accountability system, all principal officials, including the Chief Secretary, Financial Secretary, Secretary for Justice and head of government bureaux would no longer be politically neutral career civil servants. Instead, they would all be political appointees chosen by the Chief Executive. The system was portrayed as the key to solve previous administrative problems, notably the cooperation of high-ranking civil servants with the Chief Executive. Under the new system, all heads of bureau became members of the Executive Council, and came directly under the Chief Executive instead of the Chief Secretary or the Financial Secretary. The heads of the Liberal Party and Democratic Alliance for the Betterment of Hong Kong, two pro-government parties in the Legislative Council, were also appointed into the Executive Council to form a "ruling alliance," a de facto coalition. This practically shut out the pro-democratic parties and individuals.

==== Crisis of governance in 2003 ====
Tung with Thai Ambassador Tharit Charungvat in 2003

The first major move of Tung in his second term was to push for the national security legislation to implement Article 23 of the Hong Kong Basic Law in September 2002. However, the initiative drew a hostile response from the pro-democratic camp, lawyers, journalists, religious leaders and human rights organisations. This stoked public concerns that the freedoms they enjoyed would deteriorate. The sentiment, together with other factors such as the SARS epidemic in early 2003, when the government was criticised for its slow response, strained hospital services and the unexpected death toll, resulted in the largest mass demonstration since the establishment of HKSAR, with an estimated 500,000 people (out of the population of 6,800,000) marching on 1 July 2003. Many demanded that Tung step down.

In response to the protests, the leader of the Liberal Party, James Tien, resigned from the Executive Council on the evening of 6 July, signifying the withdrawal of the party's support for the bill implementing Article 23. As a result, the government had to postpone and later withdraw the bill from the legislative agenda. On 17 July 2003, Regina Ip, the then Secretary for Security who was responsible for implementing Article 23, resigned for personal reasons. Another Principal Official, Finance Secretary Antony Leung, who earlier suffered from a scandal over his purchase of a luxury vehicle weeks prior to his introduction of a car sales tax, which was dubbed as the Lexusgate scandal, resigned on the same day.

==== Subsequent developments ====
Tung with Prime Minister of Canada Paul Martin in January 2005

During the debate over Hong Kong's constitutional development, Tung was criticised as not reflecting effectively the views of the general population to push for 2007/08 universal suffrage to the central government in mainland China. Although the primary target of popular opposition was the central government, Tung's lack of support for the pro-democratic camp resulted in his low approval ratings.

In late 2003, in an attempt to bring back visitors to Hong Kong, the government agency InvestHK was mandated to sponsor the Harbour Fest music festival in October, organised by the American Chamber of Commerce. The result was a series of poorly attended concerts, HK$100m bill for the taxpayers, with the Government, InvestHK and the American Chamber of Commerce blaming each other for the flop.

Tung's cabinet suffered another blow in July 2004 when another principal official, the secretary for health, welfare and food, Yeoh Eng-kiong, resigned on 7 July to take political responsibility for the government's handling of the SARS outbreak in 2003, after the release of the investigation report of LegCo over the issue.

In late 2004, the Tung administration experienced another embarrassment as the large planned sale of government-owned real estate, Link REIT, was cancelled at the last moment by a lawsuit by a tenant from an affected estate.

With the subsequent improvement in the economy over 2004, unemployment fell and the long period of deflation ended. This resulted in a decrease in public discontent as the government's popularity improved, and popular support for the democratic movement dwindled with a protest in January attracting a mere few thousand protesters compared to the 1 July protests of 2003 and 2004. However, the popularity of Tung himself remained low compared to his deputies including Donald Tsang and Henry Tang.

==== Resignation ====
Tung's reputation suffered further damage when CCP general secretary Hu Jintao gave him a humiliating public dressing-down for poor governance in December 2004. Official sources specifically cited the poor handling of the Link REIT listing, the West Kowloon cultural project, the Hung Hom flats episode. Tung himself denied it was a dressing-down, and insisted that he retained the central government's support, although he and the rest of the government were asked to examine their past inadequacies. Hu's words, however, were thinly veiled criticism. Nevertheless, in his January 2005 Policy Address, Tung gave a rather critical verdict on his own performance.

The speculation which was running rife in the weeks in the run-up to his actual resignation, and its intensity, continued to perpetuate the impression of Tung's "weakness" and "confusion". Prior to Tung's resignation, in mid-February Stanley Ho, a tycoon with close ties with Beijing, had already commented on the possible candidates for the next Chief Executive and personally endorsed Donald Tsang. This started rumours that Tung would be nominated to the election of vice chairman of Chinese People's Political Consultative Conference (CPPCC) of the PRC. On the night of 27 February 2005, it was revealed that he and nine other persons would be appointed as new members to the CPPCC. All the local newspapers, except for the three controlled by the PRC government, namely Ta Kung Pao, Wen Wei Po and Hong Kong Commercial Daily, went to the presses preemptively on the morning of 2 March with the headline "Tung Resigns".

On 10 March 2005, Tung assembled a press conference at the Central Government Offices and announced that he had tendered his resignation due to "health problems". After flying to Beijing on 11 March, Tung was elected Vice Chairman of the Chinese People's Political Consultative Conference (CPPCC) on 12 March 2005, the last day of CPPCC annual meeting.

His resignation sparked a constitutional debate of whether his successor should fill his remaining term of two years, or start a new term of five years. Tung was mostly chosen by the PRC due to his business background.

== Post–Chief Executive ==
=== U.S.–China politics ===
Tung in 2011

In March 2005, after he resigned as Chief Executive, he was appointed vice-chairman of the Chinese People's Political Consultative Conference (CPPCC). In 2008, Tung formed the China-United States Exchange Foundation (CUSEF), a group whose stated aim is to promote better understanding between the two countries. In 2009, he was named a Global Fellow at Columbia University. In 2017, it was reported that the CUSEF has been a tool for the Chinese Communist Party to push to strengthen its influence over policy debate around the globe by massive funding of organisations abroad, for instance the China Studies department of the Johns Hopkins University's School of Advanced International Studies (SAIS).

In 2018, the University of Texas at Austin rejected funding from the CUSEF for its recently established China Public Policy Center, after U.S. Senator Ted Cruz wrote a letter to UT Austin president Greg Fenves in which Cruz expressed his concerns that the university's China Public Policy Center was considering a partnership with the foundation "given its affiliation with the People's Republic of China's United Front system and its registration as an agent of a foreign principal." Cruz also noted Tung's CPPCC vice chairmanship is "an organization which works closely with the United Front, the structure the CCP utilizes to manage foreign influence operations".

=== Influence in Hong Kong ===
During the 2012 Chief Executive election, it was reported that one of the two candidates, Leung Chun-ying was Tung's protege and therefore Leung acquired the goodwill of Xi Jinping, then the head of managing Hong Kong and Macau affairs. Leung, who was seen as the underdog, eventually won in the election over the other pro-Beijing candidate Henry Tang.

In 2014, Tung founded a thinktank Our Hong Kong Foundation. The foundation has about 80 advisors which consists of some of the most well known tycoons and public figures, drawn from the business, education, social welfare, legal and religious sectors, including former Financial Secretary Antony Leung, former Monetary Authority Chief Executive Joseph Yam, and Jack Ma, the chairman of Chinese e-commerce giant Alibaba.

In the 2017 Chief Executive election, he was seen hugging Carrie Lam, then Chief Secretary for Administration who was seen as a potential candidate for the Chief Executive after incumbent Leung Chun-ying announced he would not seek re-election. It was seen as his blessing for Lam to be the next Chief Executive. In February, the Hong Kong Economic Journal reported, citing unnamed sources, that Tung said in a closed-door meeting that Beijing might not appoint former Financial Secretary of Hong Kong John Tsang as Chief Executive even if he won the election. He said this was the reason he asked Carrie Lam to run in the election in order to prevent an "embarrassing situation". 30 electors of the legal subsector in the Election Committee expressed "deep concerns" about Tung's comments in a joint statement, stating, "Such action undermines the fairness of our Chief Executive election and shows a callous disregard for the aspirations of most Hong Kong people to have free and fair elections without ignorant and insensitive interference." He was dubbed as "kingmaker" in the Hong Kong political community.

In July 2017, Tung sold his family business Orient Overseas (International) Limited (OOIL) to Chinese state-owned Cosco Shipping in a HK$49.2 billion (US$6.3 billion) deal.

== Health and death ==
In March 2021, Tung collapsed while at the opening ceremony at the National People's Congress. His last public appearance was in July 2021, when he attended a film premiere marking the 100th Anniversary of the Chinese Communist Party. He underwent successful heart surgery at Queen Mary Hospital in Pok Fu Lam, Hong Kong, in September 2021.

Tung died at the Hong Kong Sanatorium & Hospital in Happy Valley, Hong Kong, on 8 September 2026, at the age of 89.

On 15 September 2026, a 86-member funeral committee, led by Shi Taifeng, Vice Chairman of the Chinese People's Political Consultative Conference, was formed to organize a state funeral for Tung. A vigil was held on 19 September and on 20 September, a state funeral was held at the Hong Kong Funeral Home at North Point , attended by the Chief Executive, Council President, former Chief Executives and many others before he was cremated at Cape Collinson Crematorium.

== Legacy ==
Following his death, The New York Times noted that Tung "balanced the demands of Beijing and Hong Kongers" as he was able to "carve out a path" between the Chinese government and the people of Hong Kong. The South China Morning Post said that Tung's image of him appearing like a "modest gentleman and benevolent elder" helped ease the anxiety of Hongkongers when sovereignty of the city passed from Britain to Beijing. The Financial Times remarked that Tung led Hong Kong on a path that "led to Hongkongers' deepening divide" with China and "spawned a desire for greater democracy" in the region.

Tung was widely seen as a "bridge-like" like figure when it came to Hong Kong politics and international relations. He was widely noted as a leading unifying figure during Hong Kong's transition from colonial rule. Reuters also mentioned how Tung was a "bridge" between the PRC and the United States due to Tung's personal relationship with President George W. Bush.

Despite having left office, he remained an active figure and was regarded as an influential policymaker. He was dubbed as a "kingmaker" in Hong Kong politics. The Nikkei regarded Tung as a "pro-Beijing heavyweight" while noting his family ties to the Kuomintang regime in Taiwan and to the West. The Straits Times called Tung an "an influential Hong Kong politician" and an "important adviser to Beijing" in the years following his departure from office.

== Awards ==
Tung was awarded a Grand Bauhinia Medal in 2006. He was also awarded an Honorary Doctorate degree in Social Sciences (D.S.Sc) by the Hong Kong University of Science and Technology on 10 November 2006.

On 17 September 2019, Tung was awarded by General Secretary of the Chinese Communist Party Xi Jinping the Outstanding Contributor of One Country, Two Systems (Chinese: "一国两制"杰出贡献者) national honorary title according to an order announced by the Standing Committee of the 13th National People's Congress.

== See also ==
- Executive Council of Hong Kong
- Politics of Hong Kong

Political offices
Preceded by Chris Patten as Governor of Hong Kong	Chief Executive of Hong Kong; 1997–2005	Succeeded by Donald Tsang
Preceded by Chris Patten	President of Executive Council; 1997–2005	Succeeded by Donald Tsang
Preceded by Himself as President of Provisional Executive Council	President of Executive Council; 1997–2005	Succeeded by Donald Tsang
