= Henry Fok =

Hong Kong businessman

The Honourable Henry Fok GBM
- 霍英東

Vice Chairman of the National Committee of the Chinese People's Political Consultative Conference (8th, 9th, 10th)
- In office March 27, 1993 – October 28, 2006
- Chairman: Li Ruihuan→Jia Qinglin

Member of the Standing Committee of the National People's Congress of the People's Republic of China
- In office April 27, 1988 – March 27, 1993
- Chairman: Wan Li

Personal details
- Born: 霍官泰; Fok Koon Tai; 10 May 1923 British Hong Kong
- Died: 28 October 2006 (aged 83) Peking Union Medical College Hospital, Beijing, China
- Resting place: Hong Kong Buddhist Cemetery
- Spouse(s): Elaine Lui Yin-nei (m. 1943) Elaine Fung Kin-nei (m. 1958) Lam Sook-duen (m. 1968)
- Children: 10 sons and 3 daughters With Lui: Timothy Fok Tsun-ting; Ian Fok Chun-wan; Benjamin Fok Chun-yue; Patricia Fok Lai-ping; Nora Fok Lai-lor; Lily Fok Lai-lai; With Fung: Thomas Fok Man-fong; Nelson Fok Man-bun; Manson Fok; David Fok Hing-yeung; With Lam: Donald Fok Hin-suen; Danny Fok Hin-kwong; Michael Fok Hin-keung

Chinese name
- Traditional Chinese: 霍英東
- Simplified Chinese: 霍英东
Transcriptions
Standard Mandarin
- Hanyu Pinyin: Huò Yīngdōng
Yue: Cantonese
- Jyutping: Fok3 Jing1 Dung1

Henry Fok Ying Tung GBM (10 May 1923 – 28 October 2006) was an entrepreneur and politician in Hong Kong. From 1993 until his death, Fok served as Vice Chairman of the National Committee of the Chinese People's Political Consultative Conference. He was one of the Hong Kong's wealthiest persons.

== Biography ==
Fok was born on 10 May 1923 in Hong Kong to an ethnic Tanka family. Fok's father died in a boating accident when he was just seven. He studied at Queen's College, but was not able to finish junior high due to the Japanese invasion in 1941. He worked as a labourer during that time while helping to run the family's small boat business.

=== Business ===
After the war, he became a successful businessman. His business interests included restaurants, real estate, casinos and petroleum. Fok reportedly made his first fortune gun-running into the mainland during the Korean War in the early 1950s, circumventing a United Nations arms embargo. Fok vigorously denied weapons trafficking, but admits having violated sanctions by smuggling steel and rubber as well as other items.

He was the President of the Chinese General Chamber of Commerce in Hong Kong, the President of the Hong Kong Football Association, and the President of the Real Estate Developers Association of Hong Kong. He was also the Chairman of Henry Fok Estates Ltd and the Yau Wing Co of Hong Kong.

In the 1980s Fok organized the effort to bail out OOCL from bankruptcy shortly after its founder Tung Chao-yung died.

Fok developed the Zhongshan Hot Springs Hotel, which had a golf course designed by Arnold Palmer. It was one of the first golf courses built in China since the founding of the People's Republic of China.

In 2006, Forbes magazine listed Fok as the seventh wealthiest person in Hong Kong and the 181st in the world, with a fortune of US$3.7 billion.

=== Political ===
Before the handover of Hong Kong in 1997, Henry Fok was a member of the Drafting Committee for the Basic Law of Hong Kong Special Administrative Region (SAR), the vice-chairman of the Preliminary Working Committee of Preparatory Committee of the Hong Kong SAR, and the vice-chairman of the Preparatory Committee of Hong Kong SAR. He was also Standing Committee member of 7th National People's Congress.

The press frequently reports that Henry Fok had introduced Tung Chee Hwa to Jiang Zemin as a possible candidate of the first Hong Kong Chief Executive.

Henry Fok helped Tung Chee Hwa out of a near-bankruptcy of his family's Orient Overseas Container Line in the 1980s. Because of this relationship, it was often said while Tung was the Chief Executive of Hong Kong that Fok 'intervened/advised' if times, or rather Beijing, called for it.

=== Philanthropy ===
Henry Fok founded the Fok Ying Tung Foundation in 1984, and it is now one of the largest philanthropic organisations in Hong Kong. Fok founded a high-technology business park in Nansha District, Guangzhou. He is said to have visited the site more than 500 times, and through the Foundation, pledged HK$800 million (US$100 million) to the Hong Kong University of Science and Technology in 2005 to support the initiative.

=== Personal ===
Fok's wife was Elaine Lui (呂燕妮), and he had two concubines, Elaine Fung (馮堅妮) and Lam Sook-duen (林淑端), according to the Great Qing Legal Code, which remained in force for Chinese people in Hong Kong until 1971. Some forms of polygamy remained legal in Hong Kong until it was outlawed in 1971. Among Fok's children, the best-known are:

- Timothy Fok Tsun-ting – Hong Kong Football Association chairman and Legislative Council member.
- Ian Fok Chun-wan – managing director, Yau Wing Co. Ltd; Director, Fok Ying Tung Foundation Ltd, a former chairman of the Chinese General Chamber of Commerce, whose son was convicted of drug possession in 2005.

Fok had family roots in Panyu District, Guangzhou, Guangdong.

=== Death ===
On 28 October 2006, Fok died at the age of 83 at the Peking Union Medical College in Beijing, where he was being treated for cancer. He had been diagnosed with lymphoma in 1984 and the cancer had reappeared in 2004. His body was flown back to Hong Kong for a traditional funeral in accordance with his wishes. Fok was one of the first Hong Kongers to have his casket draped in the Chinese national flag since the handover (the others being T. K. Ann and Wong Ker-lee). He was posthumously awarded the Medal of Reform Pioneer.
