= Preparatory Committee for the Hong Kong Special Administrative Region =

Government body in Hong Kong for the transition of sovereignty in 1997

Agency overview
- Formed: 26 January 1996
- Preceding agency: Preliminary Working Committee
- Employees: 150
- Agency executive: Qian Qichen, Committee Chairman

The Preparatory Committee for the Hong Kong Special Administrative Region was a body established by the People's Republic of China government on 26 January 1996 for the handover of Hong Kong in 1997.

== Overview ==
The Preparatory Committee was responsible for implementation work related to the establishment of the HKSAR, including the prescription of the method for the formation of the first government and first Legislative Council, and establishment of the Selection Committee, which in turn was responsible for the selection of the first chief executive and the members of the Provisional Legislative Council.

The Preparatory Committee consisted of 150 members, with 94 Hong Kong appointees and 56 Mainland appointees. All the members of the Preliminary Working Committee were appointed to the Preparatory Committee.

The chairman of the committee was Qian Qichen. The two vice-chairmen from the mainland side were Lu Ping and Zhou Nan. The five vice-chairmen from the Hong Kong side were Henry Fok, T. K. Ann, Tung Chee-hwa, Simon Li and Leung Chun-ying.

== See also ==
- Preliminary Working Committee
- Selection Committee
- Transfer of sovereignty over Hong Kong
