= Selection Committee (Hong Kong) =

Electoral college system in Hong Kong

- Traditional Chinese: 香港特別行政區第一屆政府推選委員會
- Simplified Chinese: 香港特别行政区第一届政府推选委员会
Transcriptions
Standard Mandarin
- Hanyu Pinyin: Xiānggǎng Tèbiéxíngzhèngqū Dìyī Jiè Zhèngfǔ Tuīxuǎn Wěiyuánhuì

The Selection Committee was an electoral college created by the Preparatory Committee in 1996 for electing the first chief executive and Provisional Legislative Council after the establishment of the Hong Kong Special Administrative Region.

The Selection Committee was responsible for recommending and electing the candidate for the first chief executive through local consultations. The ambit of the Selection Committee as later expanded by the Preparatory Committee to include responsibility for the selection of the 60 members of the Provisional Legislative Council.

Under the Basic Law, the Selection Committee would have 400 members made up of Hong Kong permanent residents. The composition of the body was equally split among four functional sectors: industrial, commercial, and financial; professional; labour, social services and religious; and politics (26 Hong Kong deputies to the NPC automatically became the members of the Selection Committee, former political figures, and Hong Kong members of the National CPPCC).

300 members of the first three sectors were elected by the members of the Preparatory Committee. It followed the procedures of nominations: a nominee had to submit his or her name to a body he or she was a member of certain commercial chamber or professional institutes and reviewed by the relevant bodies, and then nominated to the Preparatory Committee for reviewing.

There were a total of 5,789 applicants who put their names forward. On 2 November 1995, the 400 members were elected by the members of the Preparatory Committee.

The body for electing the second chief executive was later replaced by the Election Committee.

== See also ==
- Chief Executive of Hong Kong
- Election Committee
- 1996 Hong Kong Chief Executive election
- 1996 Hong Kong provisional legislative election
- Preparatory Committee for the Hong Kong Special Administrative Region
- Provisional Legislative Council
