= Provisional Legislative Council =

Hong Kong legislature

Provisional Legislative Council of the Hong Kong Special Administrative Region 香港特別行政區臨時立法會

Type
- Type: Unicameral

History
- Established: 25 January 1997; 29 years ago
- Disbanded: 30 June 1998; 28 years ago
- Preceded by: Colonial Legislative Council
- Succeeded by: Legislative Council HKSAR

Leadership
- President: Rita Fan, Independent
- Seats: 60

Elections
- Voting system: Plurality-at-large by Selection Committee
- Last election: 21 December 1996

Meeting place
- Huaxia Art Centre (February–June 1997); Hong Kong Convention and Exhibition Centre (1 July 1997); Legislative Council Building (1 July 1997 – 30 June 1998)

Provisional Legislative Council
- Traditional Chinese: 香港特別行政區臨時立法會
- Simplified Chinese: 香港特别行政区临时立法会
Transcriptions
Standard Mandarin
- Hanyu Pinyin: Xiānggǎng Tèbiéxíngzhèngqū Línshí Lìfǎhuì
Yue: Cantonese
- Yale Romanization: Hēung góng dahk biht hàhng jing kēui làhm sìh lahp faat wuih
- Jyutping: Hoeng1 gong2 dak6 bit6 hang4 zing3 keoi1 lam4 si4 lap6 faat3 wui6*2

The Provisional Legislative Council (PLC) was the interim legislature of Hong Kong that operated from 1997 to 1998. The legislature was founded in Guangzhou and sat in Shenzhen from 1996 (with offices in Hong Kong), until the 1997 handover when it moved to Hong Kong to temporarily replace the Legislative Council of Hong Kong.

The legislature was established by the Preparatory Committee for the Hong Kong Special Administrative Region by resolution at its Second Plenary Session on 24 March 1996. The 60 members of the PLC were elected on 21 December 1996 by the 400-member Selection Committee for the First Government of the HKSAR, which also elected the first Chief Executive. The official start date for this council was on 25 January 1997.

== History ==
=== 1992 electoral reforms ===
When the Hong Kong Basic Law was promulgated on 4 April 1990, the National People's Congress (NPC) issued a decision on the same day on the formation of the first government and legislature of the Hong Kong Special Administrative Region. The decision and the Basic Law envisioned the Legislative Council returned from the 1995 Hong Kong legislative election to continue operating until 1998, when the next legislative election would be due.

The NPC decided that the first legislature was to be formed according to "principles of State sovereignty and smooth transition". More specifically, the first legislature was to have 60 members, 20 of which returned from direct geographical constituency elections, 30 members from functional constituencies and 10 members returned by an election committee. If the composition of the last colonial Legislative Council conforms to the NPC decision and the Basic Law, its members automatically become members of the first post-handover Legislative Council, provided that they uphold the Basic Law, plead allegiance to the Hong Kong Special Administrative Region and meet the requirements of the Basic Law.

The automatic transition (or the "through-train" model) was abandoned on 31 August 1994, when the NPC decided the 1995 Legislative Council would end with British sovereignty over Hong Kong. The policy changed when the Hong Kong government decided the 1995 legislature would be formed with a new electoral formula from the 1994 electoral reform announced by Hong Kong Governor Chris Patten in October 1992. Although the new formula expanded Hong Kong's electoral base, it conformed with the seat composition described in the NPC decision by only allowing 33 percent of seats to be elected through universal suffrage. This was possible only because the decision did not define the election committee and the functional constituency electorate.

The electoral reform created nine functional constituencies that gave paid labourers voting rights and abolished voting by corporations, which could vote in the old functional constituencies. As a result, the number of voters in the functional constituencies increased to about 2.7 million from 104,609. The reform also defined the election committee to consist of district board members, who were themselves elected by universal suffrage.

China did not recognise the Legislative Council returned after the electoral reform. It stated the new composition violated the Sino-British Joint Declaration, the Basic Law and the NPC decision made in 1990. It also stated the reforms were introduced unilaterally, and China was not consulted on the change in seat composition.

Negotiations between the British and Chinese governments on the legislative transition began in April 1993, but ended in November 1993 without a consensus. On 2 July 1993, the NPC Standing Committee (NPCSC) formed the Preliminary Working Committee, an organisation that prepared for the establishment of the Preparatory Committee for the Hong Kong Special Administrative Region in 1996. According to legal scholar Albert Chen, the PLC was an idea of the Preliminary Working Committee.

=== Establishment ===
On 26 January 1996, the Preparatory Committee was formed in accordance with the 1990 NPC decision. At its second plenary session on 24 March 1996, the Preparatory Committee established the PLC. The PLC's composition was consistent with the 1990 NPC decision, but all members were to be chosen by the Selection Committee. By the end of 1996, all 60 members of the PLC had been chosen by the selection committee controlled by China. The Democratic Party boycotted the PLC and criticised it for being undemocratic, while politicians Tsang Yok-sing, Elsie Tu, Dominic Chan and Peggy Lam gained a seat.

The Provisional Legislative Council convened its first meeting on 25 January 1997 at the Shenzhen Guesthouse Hotel in Shenzhen. At the meeting, it elected its first president, Rita Fan. From 1 July 1997 to 1998, it sat at the then Legislative Council Building in Hong Kong.

Council committees and the LegCo Secretariat sat at various locations, including:

- Huaxia Art Centre – 1 Guanqiao Street in the Overseas Chinese Town in Nanshan District, Shenzhen from 22 February to 21 June 1997
- Hong Kong Convention and Exhibition Centre Extension – 1 July 1997

The Council held 60 meetings, 17 motions and passed 13 bills introduced by the Chief Executive of Hong Kong. The Legco Secretariat offices were on the 3rd Floor of the Huaxia Art Centre.

== Organisation ==
=== President of the Provisional Legislative Council ===
The president of the PLC was Rita Fan, who later led the legislative council following the handover.

=== Officers of the Provisional Legislative Council ===
The only officer found in the records was for the Clerk, Pauline Ng Man-Wah. Immediately after the Provisional Legislative Council was disbanded, she became the clerk of the Legislative Council of Hong Kong. She retired from this position on 28 August 2012.

=== Standing committees ===
- Finance Committee
- Public Accounts Committee
- Committee of Members' Interest

== Legislative functions ==
The legislative functions of the PLC are described by the Preparatory Committee in 1996.

== Proceedings ==
=== Meeting broadcast ===
Sessions of the PLC were broadcast with assistance from the Shenzhen Television Station.

== Legal status ==
The PLC is neither referred to in the Basic Law nor the Joint Declaration as their drafters assumed the last colonial legislative session would automatically become the Special Administrative Region's first legislature. The legality of the PLC was challenged in the case HKSAR v Ma Wai Kwan decided by the Court of Appeal on 29 July 1997. The defendants argued that the PLC was unlawful because it did not satisfy the Basic Law's definition of Hong Kong's legislature in Annex II. The court dismissed the argument. Among other reasons, the court held that as a local court it had no power to review an act of a sovereign authority. The court reasoned that since Article 19 of the Basic Law did not expand its judicial powers and that it had no power to review the validity of a sovereign act under colonial rule, it did not hold such power after the handover. While Justice Gerald Nazareth agreed with the majority decision, he questioned whether the constitutional structure of China and that of the United Kingdom were analogous. He also noted there was no "detailed review" of the Chinese constitution during the trial. The decision in Ma Wai Kwan was upheld by the Court of Final Appeal in Ng Ka Ling v Director of Immigration decided in January 1999.

Johannes Chan commented that the lack of judicial review power to review acts of Parliament reflected parliamentary supremacy, a doctrine borne out of unwritten constitutional systems. Since China has a written constitution and that the Basic Law describes the relationship between Hong Kong and the central government unlike the colonial Letters Patent and the Royal Instructions, Chan questioned whether parliamentary supremacy still fully applies in Hong Kong after 1997.

== See also ==
- Legislative Council of Hong Kong
- 1996 Hong Kong Provisional Legislature election
- Legislation of the Provisional Government of Hong Kong
