= Matthias Der =

The Right Reverend Matthias Der
- Bishop of Hong Kong Island
- Province: Hong Kong Anglican Church
- Diocese: Hong Kong Island
- Installed: 2 January 2021
- Predecessor: Paul Kwong

Personal details
- Born: 1964 (age 61–62) Hong Kong
- Denomination: Anglican
- Education: University of Toronto; Wycliffe College

Ordination history
History
Episcopal consecration
- Principal consecrator: Paul Kwong
- Co-consecrators: Peter Kwong; Thomas Soo; Louis Tsui; Andrew Chan; Timothy Kwok

Matthias Clement Tze-Wo Der
- Traditional Chinese: 謝子和
- Simplified Chinese: 谢子和
Transcriptions
Standard Mandarin
- Hanyu Pinyin: Xiè Zǐhé
Yue: Cantonese
- Jyutping: ze6 zi2 wo4

Matthias Clement Tze-Wo Der (Chinese: 謝子和; born 14 August 1964) is an Anglican bishop from Hong Kong. He has served as Bishop of Hong Kong Island since January 2021. Prior to his episcopacy, he served as the dean of St John's Cathedral, Hong Kong from July 2012 to December 2020.

== Early life ==
Der was born in Hong Kong and moved to Taiwan from 1966 to 1976, where his father served as priest in the Church of the Good Shepherd in the Episcopal Church. He described himself as a person "who could not speak clearly until the age of four, who struggled through school for most of his early schooling and who didn't learn the ABCs till the age of 12". In 1981, Der attended Seabury Hall, a boarding school in Hawaii. He attended the University of Toronto in 1984 and graduated with Bachelor of Arts (Sociology) and obtained a Master of Divinity degree from Wycliffe College, Toronto in 1990.

== Ministry ==
In 1990, he was ordained to the diaconate in the Diocese of Toronto of the Anglican Church of Canada, and to the priesthood in 1991. After serving his curacy, Der served as incumbent of St Christopher's Anglican Church in Greater Toronto for twenty years, helping St Christopher expand to a parish worshipping from two sites in North York and Richmond Hill. He was appointed an Honorary Canon of St James’ Cathedral, Toronto in 2007.

Der was appointed Dean of St John's Cathedral of Hong Kong Sheng Kung Hui (Hong Kong Anglican Church) in July 2012 and installed on 13 October 2012.

He is also a delegate to the General Synod of Hong Kong Sheng Kung Hui and serves as the Director of Supervisors for student placement at SKH Ming Hua Theological College and a member of the Board of Governors of Matilda International Hospital.

Der was elected as the Bishop Coadjutor of the Diocese of Hong Kong Island in November 2019. He was consecrated to the episcopate on 3 October 2020 at St John's Cathedral (Hong Kong), after postponement due to the coronavirus pandemic in Hong Kong, which also broke decades-long tradition with the absence of co-consecrators from other Anglican Communion provinces. He was enthroned as the Bishop of Hong Kong Island on 2 January 2021, succeeding Paul Kwong

== Family ==
Matthias Der is son of Canon Edmund B. Der (謝博文法政牧師), an Anglican priest and canon who served in Hong Kong, Taiwan, Canada and USA. His younger brother Canon Philip Der (謝子樂法政牧師) is also an Anglican priest and canon, who succeeded Matthias as incumbent at St Christopher. Matthias is married, and the couple have two daughters.

Hong Kong Sheng Kung Hui titles
Preceded by Paul Kwong	Bishop of Hong Kong Island; 2021–	Incumbent
Preceded by Andrew Chan	Dean of St John's Cathedral; 2012–2020	Succeeded by Chan Kwok-keung
