= Andrew Tsu =

The Right Reverend Andrew Tsu
- Assistant Bishop
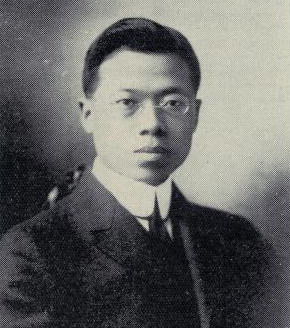
- Bishop Tsu c. 1925
- Church: Chung Hua Sheng Kung Hui
- Diocese: Hong Kong
- In office: 1940 to 1946

Orders
- Ordination: 1907 (deacon); 1912 (priest)
- Consecration: May 1, 1940 by Ronald Hall

Personal details
- Born: Tsu Yu-yü; December 18, 1885
- Died: 13 April 1986 (aged 100)
- Denomination: Anglicanism
- Education: St. John's College, Shanghai; General Theological Seminary

Andrew Yu-Yue Tsu (traditional Chinese: 朱友漁; simplified Chinese: 朱友渔; Wade–Giles: Chu Yu-yü, December 18, 1885 – April 13, 1986) was the eighth Chinese Anglican bishop consecrated in the Chung Hua Sheng Kung Hui.

== Biography ==
Tsu was born on December 18, 1885. He studied at St. John's College, Shanghai, graduating in 1904. He was ordained to the diaconate (1907) and priesthood (1912). He attended the General Theological Seminary and Columbia University in New York following the beginning of his ministry in China, receiving a BD from GTS in 1909.

He was consecrated on May 1, 1940, in Holy Trinity Cathedral, Shanghai as assistant bishop to Ronald Owen Hall of the Anglican Diocese of Hong Kong; his co-consecrators included Daniel Trumbull Huntington and Francis Lushington Norris. His official title was "Assistant Bishop of Hongkong, serving as Bishop of Kunming, in charge of the Yunnan-Kweichow Missionary District." "Yunnan-Kweichow" was shorted to "Yun-Kwei," but during World War II, Tsu was known informally as "Bishop of the Burma Road". He attended the 1948 Lambeth Conference.

Following his 1946 appointment as General Secretary of the Chung Hua Sheng Kung Hui, Tsu was succeeded as "Bishop for Yun-Kwei" by Quentin Huang, consecrated on August 14, 1946, in Santa Barbara, California.

With the advance of Communism in China, he lived in exile in the United States from 1951. He served in the Episcopal Diocese of Pennsylvania for the next 18 years, until retiring.

Bishop Tsu was married to Caroline Alida Huie, third daughter of the Reverend Huie Kin, founder of the First Presbyterian Church in New York City. He died on April 13, 1986, having reached 100 years old.
