= Florence Li Tim-Oi =

Canadian Anglican priest

First Woman Priest in the Anglican Communion
- Born: 5 May 1907; Hong Kong
- Died: 26 February 1992 (aged 84); Toronto, Ontario, Canada
- Venerated in: Episcopal Church (United States), Anglican Church of Canada
- Feast: 24 January (Episcopal Church (United States)); 26 February (Anglican Church of Canada)

Florence Li Tim-Oi (traditional Chinese: 李添嬡; simplified Chinese: 李添嫒; Jyutping: lei5 tim1 oi3; pinyin: Lǐ Tiān'ài; 5 May 1907 – 26 February 1992) was a Hong Kong-born Anglican priest. She was the first woman to be ordained to the priesthood in the Anglican Communion on 25 January 1944.

== Biography ==
Li Tim-Oi was born in Aberdeen, Hong Kong, to parents who supported her education. While at school she was baptised in the Anglican church, taking the name Florence after Florence Nightingale. In 1931, Li was present at the ordination of Deaconess Lucy Vincent at St. John's Cathedral in Hong Kong when the preacher had asked for women to give their lives to work for Christian ministry. Inspired by this, Li would eventually go to Canton Union Theological College to receive her theological education before returning to Hong Kong in 1938. After working for two years in All Saints Cathedral, in Kowloon, helping refugees in Hong Kong who fled mainland China in the midst of the Second Sino-Japanese War, Li was sent by Bishop Ronald Hall, Bishop of Victoria, Hong Kong, to help with refugees in Macau at the Macau Protestant Chapel. Six months into her new post, she returned to Hong Kong to be ordained as a deaconess on 22 May 1941 by Bishop Hall at St. John's Cathedral, where she received her first call.

The Japanese occupation of Hong Kong and of parts of China had made it impossible for Anglican priests to get to neutral Macau, where there was no resident Anglican priest; Li was, despite not being ordained a priest at that time, given permission by Hall to give the sacraments to Anglicans. Hall explained to the Archbishop of Canterbury at the time, William Temple: "I have given her permission to celebrate the Lord’s Supper. If I could reach her physically I should ordain her priest rather than give her permission … I'm not an advocate for the ordination of women. I am, however, determined that no prejudices should prevent the congregations committed to my care having the sacraments of the Church."

In January 1944, Li travelled through Japanese-occupied territory to the small town of Hsinxing, as yet unoccupied by the Japanese, to meet with Hall; from there they proceeded to Shaoqing where he regularised her administration of the sacraments by ordaining her as a priest on 25 January 1944. William Temple confided to others his conflicting views but he felt compelled to take a public stand against it. It was to be 30 years before any Anglican church regularised the ordination of women; to avoid further controversy she resigned her licence (though not her priest's orders) after the end of the war.

In 1948 she was among a group of Chinese clergy sent to visit the USA. She was asked not to preach during the visit. On her return to China she worked in a maternity home and childcare in Hepu. In 1951 she went to study at the private theological Yenching University in Beijing and then returned to Union Theological College in Canton to teach English and theology from 1953 until 1957. During this time, social changes from the rise of the People's Republic of China meant she was subjected to much public criticism and ridicule for adhering to a foreign religion.

The Communist government in China closed all churches from 1958 to 1974, during which time Li was compelled to work on a farm and then in a factory. She was forced to undergo political re-education because she was designated as a counter-revolutionary. Li Tim-Oi went to the mountains to pray during that era because she was scared to be seen with her fellow Christian friends. She said that she nearly committed suicide during those long years of persecution. The Red Guards even forced her to cut up her own church vestments with scissors. In 1974 she was allowed to retire from factory work.

When Hong Kong ordained two further women priests (Joyce M. Bennett and Jane Hwang Hsien Yuen) in 1971, she was officially recognised as a priest in the diocese. However, Li was not in communication with the church in Hong Kong so was not aware of this for several years. When public religious worship was permitted from 1979 she was one of those to develop and lead the church services.

In the 1980s it was possible for Li to leave China. She was appointed an honorary (nonstipendiary) assistant priest at St. John's Chinese congregation and St. Matthew's parish in Toronto in 1983. In 1984 she was reinstated as priest by the Anglican Church of Canada that ordained women as priests since 1975. She served the Chinese community at St. Johns and St. Matthews until she died. She also officiated at the Cathedral Church of St. James in Toronto for several years. In 1984 she was at Westminster Abbey for a celebration of 40 years since her ordination as priest. She died on 26 February 1992 in Toronto.

Li was awarded Doctorates of Divinity by Trinity College, Toronto and the General Theological Seminary, New York.

== Tributes ==
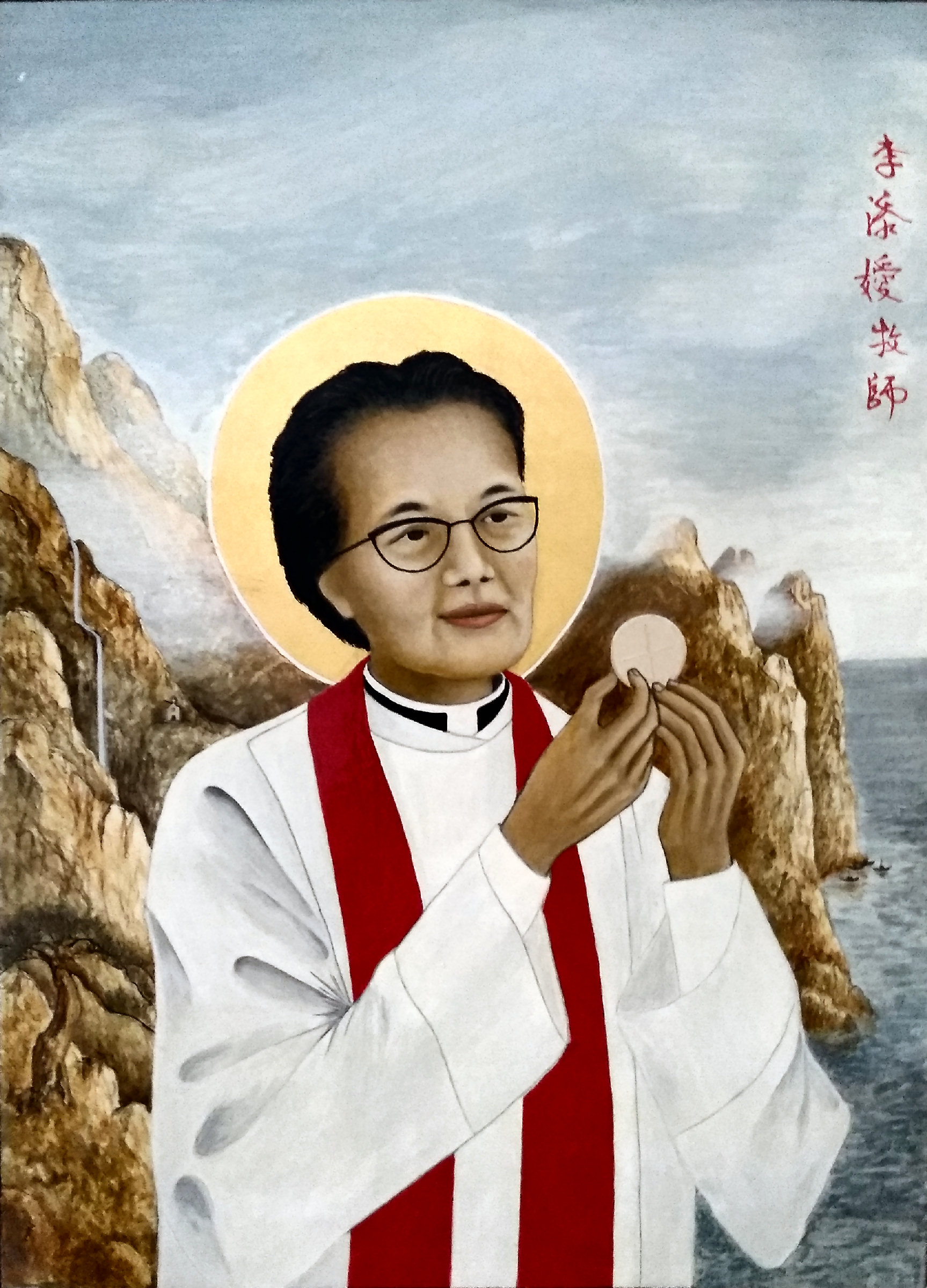
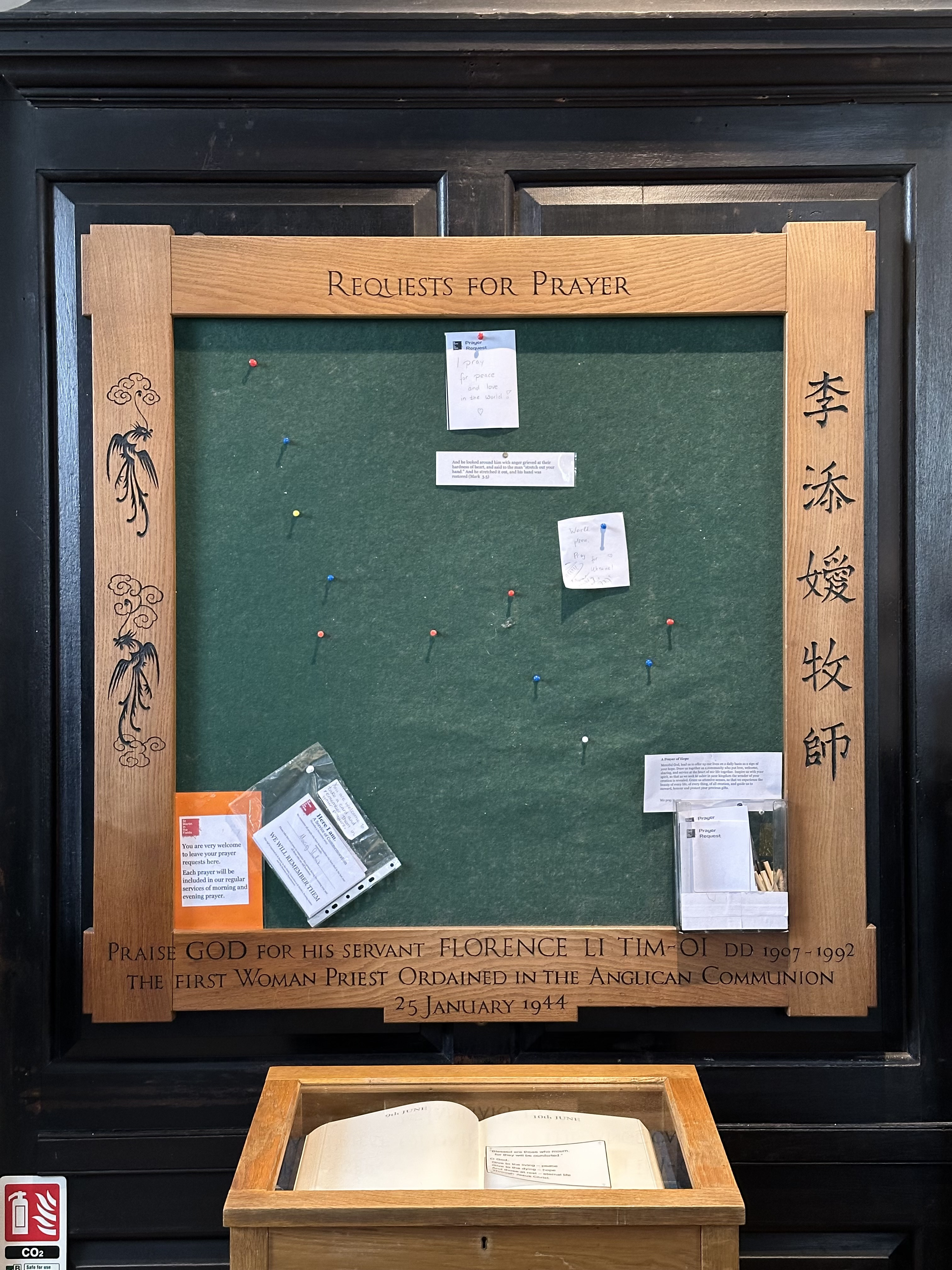
Li is venerated at St Martin-in-the-Fields, London by an icon (left). Her Chinese and English names are carved onto a bulletin board (right) for prayer requests at the church.

In 2003, the Episcopal Church (United States) fixed 24 January as her feast day in Lesser Feasts and Fasts, based on the eve of the anniversary of her ordination. In 2007, the Anglican Communion celebrated the centennial of her birth. In 2018, she was made a permanent part of the Episcopal Church's calendar of saints.

She is also memorialized in the calendar of saints of the Anglican Church of Canada with a feast day on February 26, the anniversary of her death.

Her archives are held in the Lusi Wong Library at Renison University College, the Anglican college at the University of Waterloo.

== See also ==
- Ordination of women in the Anglican Communion
