= Joyce Bennett (priest) =

British woman priest

Joyce Mary Bennett OBE (Chinese: 班佐時; 22 April 1923 – 11 July 2015) was the first Englishwoman to be ordained a priest in the Anglican Communion in 1971. She moved to Hong Kong to work as a teacher but later was ordained as a deacon before ordination as a priest came in 1971. As a fluent Chinese speaker, when she retired, she ministered to Chinese Christians in the United Kingdom until her death in 2015.

== Biography ==
Bennett was born in London. She was educated at Burlington school, Westminster, which was evacuated during the Second World War, to Milham Ford School in Oxford. She then took a degree in history and a diploma in education at Westfield College. In 1949, she went to Hong Kong for the Church Mission Society to work at St. Stephen's Girls' College, and was eventually ordained a deacon in 1962. She was fluent in Chinese.

Bishop Gilbert Baker of the Diocese of Hong Kong and Macao petitioned the Archbishop of Canterbury, Michael Ramsey, for permission to ordain women such as Bennett. Hong Kong had already previously ordained a woman priest, Florence Li Tim-Oi, during the Japanese occupation in the Second World War on an emergency basis. The Archbishop consulted the matter at the Anglican Consultative Council. The Council voted, over Archbishop Michael's objections, that there was no impediment to ordaining women as priests as long as the Province allowed. As Hong Kong was extra-provincial, the ordination of Bennett was allowed with permission quietly granted by the Archbishop. Along with Jane Hwang, Bennett was ordained a priest in December 1971. Whilst visiting England, she refused offers from Church of England congregations to celebrate Holy Communion in their churches.

She was the founding principal of St Catharine's School for Girls, Kwun Tong. Bennett served as an Unofficial Member of the Legislative Council of Hong Kong from 1976 to 1983.

She was made an OBE in the 1979 New Year Honours, and in 1984 received an honorary doctorate from Hong Kong University. In 1994 she was made an Honorary Fellow of Queen Mary University of London. Following her retirement back to the United Kingdom, she ministered to the Chinese Christian community at St Martin-in-the-Fields in London until she died in 2015.

== Works ==
- Bennett, Joyce Mary (1991). Hasten Slowly: The First Legal Ordination of Women Priests. London: Little London Associates. ISBN 978-1-872178-01-1.
- Bennett, Joyce Mary (2003). This God Business. Hong Kong: Religious Education Resource Centre.

== See also ==
- Ordination of women in the Anglican Communion
