= Gilbert Baker (bishop) =

British Anglican bishop (1910-1986)

John Gilbert Hindley Baker (Chinese: 白約翰; 10 October 1910 – 29 April 1986) was a British Anglican bishop who served as Bishop of Hong Kong and Macao (diocesan bishop of the Diocese of Hong Kong and Macau) from 1966 to 1980.

== Early life ==
Baker was born in 1910 as the fourth child of Arthur Ernest Baker and Agnes Flora Baker (née Hindley). His birth records and Census records show his name as John Gilbert Hindley Baker — all the children in the family had 'Hindley' as one of their middle names. He graduated Christ Church, Oxford in 1932, was made deacon in 1935 and ordained priest in 1936. Baker entered the Church of England and became Church Missionary Society (CMS) missionary in China in the 1920s.

A fluent speaker of English and Cantonese, together with some Mandarin, Baker taught at both Lingnan University and Saint John's University, Shanghai. He travelled extensively over China both before and during Second Sino-Japanese War, being in Canton at the time of the fall of the city to the Japanese. He later had to leave China via the Burma Road in order to reach the United States to marry his wife, who was another missionary in China.

== Bishop ==
In 1966, Baker was appointed Bishop of the Anglican Diocese of Hong Kong and Macau, succeeding Ronald Hall. He was chosen following the decision of the previous bishop-elect, Joost de Blank (former Archbishop of Cape Town), not to take up his new appointment due to ill health. Baker was consecrated a bishop on 6 December 1966, by James C. L. Wong, Bishop of Taiwan, at St John's Cathedral, Hong Kong.

Baker was able to ordain, with approval of the Anglican Consultative Council, the first "authorised" Anglican female priests worldwide. In February 1971, the Anglican Consultative Council (ACC) held its first meeting in Limuru, Kenya, each province sending a bishop, a priest, a layman and a woman observer. By a narrow majority, the ACC passed Resolution 28 which confirmed that "the question of the ordination of women was an urgent matter" and that if the Bishop of Hong Kong decided to ordain women to the priesthood, "his action will be acceptable to this Council". On 28 November 1971, Baker ordained Jane Hwang and an English CMS missionary, Joyce M. Bennett, to the priesthood. His predecessor, Ronald Hall, had ordained the first "unauthorised" female priest.

During his time as bishop, Baker remodelled the Bishop's House to incorporate a residence, as Bishop Hall had chosen to live in a bungalow above Dao Fong Shan. Bishop Baker Secondary School in Yuen Long is named after him. He was succeeded as bishop by Peter Kwong in 1981.

== Bibliography ==
- Flowing Ways - Our life in China

Anglican Communion titles
Preceded by Ronald Hall	Bishop of Hong Kong and Macau; 1966 – 1980	Succeeded by Peter Kwong
