= Paul Kwong =

Chinese bishop (born 1950)

The Most Reverend Dr Paul Kwong CStJ
- Archbishop and Primate Emeritus of Hong Kong
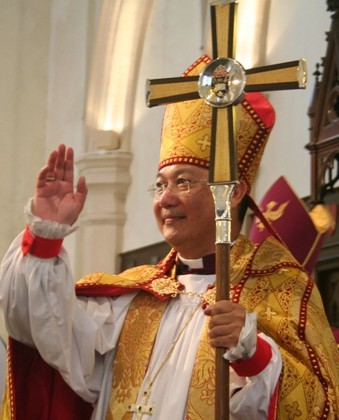
- Church: Hong Kong Sheng Kung Hui
- Province: Province of Hong Kong
- Diocese: Hong Kong Island
- Elected: 3 February 2007
- Installed: 26 September 2007
- Retired: 3 January 2021
- Predecessor: Peter Kwong
- Successor: Andrew Chan

Personal details
- Born: 1950 (age 75–76) British Hong Kong
- Denomination: Anglicanism
- Education: Lingnan College; Church Divinity School of the Pacific; University of Birmingham

Ordination history
History
Diaconal ordination
- Date: 1982
Priestly ordination
- Date: 1983
Episcopal consecration
- Consecrated by: Peter Kwong
- Date: 25 March 2006

Paul Kwong
- Traditional Chinese: 鄺保羅
- Simplified Chinese: 邝保罗
Transcriptions
Standard Mandarin
- Hanyu Pinyin: Kuàng Bǎoluó
- Wade–Giles: K'uang Paolo
- Yale Romanization: Kwàng Bǎolwó
- IPA: [kʰwâŋ pàʊlwǒ]
Yue: Cantonese
- Yale Romanization: Kwong bóulòh
- Jyutping: Kwong3 bou2lo4
- IPA: [kʷʰɔ̄ːŋ pǒulɔ̏ː]

Paul Kwong CStJ (Chinese: 鄺保羅; born 28 February 1950) is a retired Anglican bishop from Hong Kong, who served as Archbishop and Primate of Hong Kong Sheng Kung Hui, Bishop of Hong Kong Island, and Bishop of Macau from 2007 to 2021. Kwong is also the current chair of the Anglican Consultative Council, as the first sitting primate to lead an ACC meeting. Kwong is also a member of the Chinese People's Political Consultative Conference (CPPCC) taking a pro-Beijing stance.

== Early life and education ==
Kwong was born to a local Christian family in 1950. His father was a teacher and his great-grandfather, Kwong Yat-sau, was the first Chinese priest in the Diocese of Victoria. Kwong is a fourth-generation Anglican.

Kwong was first graduated from Lingnan College with a Bachelor of Arts in English Language degree in 1977. After graduation, he was admitted to Church Divinity School of the Pacific in 1979 to pursue studies in a Master of Theology degree, then graduated in 1982. Kwong was admitted to University of Birmingham to study a degree of Doctor of Philosophy in 1996, then graduated in 2008.

== Ministry and public services ==
Kwong was ordained deacon in 1982 and priest in 1983. Upon the ordination, he was appointed curate of Holy Trinity Church in 1983. Three years later, Kwong was appointed vicar of St. Matthias' Church, leading the parish until 1996. He was chaplain to St. John's Cathedral with responsibility for the Mandarin speaking congregation, and also served as assistant to the Archbishop, and Provincial General Secretary.

Kwong was first elected Bishop on 30 December 2005 and consecrated on 25 March 2006 at St John's Cathedral. Following his consecration, Kwong became Coadjutor Bishop until his predecessor, Peter Kwong, left office on 31 December 2006. He was later enthroned diocesan bishop on 15 January 2007. After being elected by the General Synod on 3 February 2007, Kwong was installed Archbishop on 26 September 2007 at St John's Cathedral (Hong Kong). He was reelected Archbishop by the General Synod on 1 June 2013. His advisor for theological and historical studies is Rev Dr Philip L. Wickeri, Professor of Church History at HKSKH Ming Hua Theological College.

Kwong was conferred an honorary degree of Doctor of Laws by Lingnan University, his alma mater, on 16 October 2007. Kwong was designated member of Chinese People's Political Consultative Conference, political advisory body of People's Republic of China, in February 2013.

Kwong was elected chairperson of the Anglican Consultative Council on 15 April 2016 during the Lambeth Conference, succeeding James Tengatenga, then Bishop of Southern Malawi. Prior to this appointment, he has served as the ACC Standing Committee since 2012.

He was also awarded Dean's Cross for Servant Leadership in Church and Society Award by Virginia Theological Seminary on 13 November 2016, making him the first non-American to receive the honor. In 2017, he was enthroned as Episcopal Canon of St. George's Cathedral, Jerusalem.

Kwong retired in January 2021, succeeded by Matthias Der, Dean of St John's Cathedral, as the bishop of Hong Kong Island and by Andrew Chan, Bishop of Western Kowloon, as Archbishop of Hong Kong. He was invited by Archbishop Chan to be Archbishop Emeritus of Hong Kong.

== Political views ==
Paul Kwong has been known for his staunch pro-Beijing stance in Hong Kong. During an interview with the reporters of Echo, official newspaper published by the Province, Kwong stated that a universal suffrage would not be a "panacea", and numerous social issues in Hong Kong would still exist even after its implementation. He also voiced objection to civil disobedience as a means to strive for democracy in Hong Kong and expressed his reservations about the Occupy Central movement in the same interview.

== Controversy ==
=== Pro-Beijing homily ===
In a homily he gave to the faithful in St. Paul's Church on 6 July 2014, Paul Kwong ridiculed the 511 protesters who were arrested during a sit-in protest following the annual 1 July rally, suggesting they should "bring along their Filipino maids to the march". He also criticized their lack of critical thinking ability and expressed his perplexity over why some Hong Kong people "have to speak up so much" in that homily.

Kwong then quoted several verses in Book of Isaiah to support his claim that Jesus remained silent in the face of crucifixion, saying, "Jesus remained silent in the face of Pilate. He was like a lamb awaiting slaughter." He further added, "[s]ometimes we don't have to say anything. Silence is better than saying anything."

Kwong also condemned some lawmakers for being "irrational and violent" when expressing opinion in meetings of the Legislative Council, saying, "I don't think he would act like a few councilors we have now, throwing everything around. I don't think that if Jesus was in the streets today, he would use such humiliating words to scold government officials and other people. I don't think that Jesus would express himself with such irrational violence."

Kwong later mentioned a church member's opposition to the government's proposed developments in northeastern New Territories, quoting the church member's assertion that Hong Kong is losing its autonomy. He rebutted the idea, expressing his disbelief that mainlanders would be "given all new flats". Kwong further added, "Hong Kong's autonomy is just partial autonomy, not full autonomy."

Kwong's comments soon sparked controversy among pan-democrats as well as church members. Wu Chi-wai, pastor from Christian and Missionary Alliance, responded that it would be "unfair to use Jesus to fit some personal values and orientation". He also challenged Kwong's claim that Jesus remained silent in contempt of crucifixion. Emily Lau, then-chairwoman of the Democratic Party, criticized him for being too cynical, expressing her disappointment that Kwong "had lashed out at the students". Chan Kin-man, co-organizer of Occupy Central movement, queried Kwong's attitude, saying, "[b]elievers and society expected religious leaders to speak up to manifest the value of their belief."

== Bibliography ==
- Kwong, Paul (2011). Identity in Community: Toward a Theological Agenda for the Hong Kong SAR. Münster: LIT Verlag. ISBN 978-3-643-90078-4.
- Kwong, Paul (2013). "The Hong Kong Sheng Kung Hui." In The Wiley-Blackwell Companion to the Anglican Communion, edited by Ian S. Markham, J. Barney Hawkins IV, Justyn Terry et al., 253–62. Chichester, West Sussex: Wiley-Blackwell. ISBN 978-1-118-32086-0.
- Kwong, Paul and Philip Wickeri (2015). "Sheng Kung Hui: The Contextualization of Anglicanism in Hong Kong." In The Oxford Handbook of Anglican Studies, edited by Sathianathan Clarke Mark Chapman and Martyn Percy, 256–70. Oxford: Oxford University Press.

== See also ==
- Hong Kong Sheng Kung Hui
- Archbishop of Hong Kong
- Primate

Anglican Communion titles
Preceded by Peter Kwong	Archbishop and Primate of Hong Kong; 2007–2021	Succeeded by Andrew Chan
Preceded by Peter Kwong	Bishop of Hong Kong Island; 2007–2021	Succeeded by Matthias Der
Preceded by Peter Kwong	Bishop of Macau; 2007–2021	Succeeded by Andrew Chan
Preceded by James Tengatenga	Chair of the Anglican Consultative Council; 2016–2023	Succeeded by Maggie Swinson
