= Alaric Rose =

Dean of Hong Kong from 1941 until 1952

Alaric Pearson Rose was Dean of Hong Kong from 1941 until 1952.

Rose was born 26 September 1909 in Lye and Stourbridge, England. He was educated at St Edmund Hall, Oxford and ordained in 1933. After a curacy in Gateshead he was Chaplain at St. John's Cathedral, Hong Kong until his appointment as Dean; and Canon Residentiary afterwards.

Rose was appointed as the first full-time philosophy lecturer at the University of Hong Kong in 1952 (HKU Council Minutes, 22 May 1952, 7), and often acted as Head of Department. He retired from the university in 1961.

Rose died in Harbourne, Birmingham, England on 27 December 1985.

Church of England titles
| Preceded by John Leonard Wilson | Dean of Hong Kong; 1941–1952 | Succeeded by Barry Dorn Till |
