= S.K.H. St. Christopher's Home =

S.K.H. St. Christopher's Home (聖公會聖基道兒童院)
- Founded: 1935
- Founder: Bishop R.O. Hall
- Type: Non-governmental organisation
- Location: 15/F, The Hong Kong Federation of Youth Groups Building, 21 Pak Fuk Road, North Point, Hong Kong
- Region served: Hong Kong
- Method: Residential Child Care Preschool education
- Website: skhsch.org.hk (English and Traditional Chinese)

S.K.H. St. Christopher's Home (Chinese: 聖公會聖基道兒童院) is a child-focused Christian social service organisation in Hong Kong founded by Bishop R.O. Hall in 1935. It is the largest non-governmental organisation in Hong Kong providing small group home service for children who cannot receive adequate family care.

== Mission ==
The mission of St. Christopher's Home is to create and sustain a healthy environment for children and youths to grow, to develop potentials and to live a life of fullness.

== Background ==
Sheng Kung Hui St. Christopher's Home was founded in 1935 by Bishop Ronald Hall in Tai Po. It is named after a saint, Christopher, the "bearer of Christ", who carried the Christchild across the dangerous river. It began as a small orphanage which would take care of just a few homeless children. In response to the society's changing needs, the home has extended its services beyond residential care for children to a wide range of child-focused social services, such as pre-primary education services, children health development services and support for needy newly arrived children from the mainland from 1993.

== Services ==
=== Residential Child Care Services ===
Residential Child Care services are divided into two categories, namely the Small Group Home and the Foster Care Service.

==== Small Group Home ====
In seeing that many young children are unable to receive adequate care and proper attention due to family crisis and problems, St. Christopher's Home set up small group homes to compensate for what these children lack. Small group homes basically serve three purposes including: Protecting and promoting the health and welfare of children, taking care of their development (physically and mentally) and last but not least, enhancing their potential development, sense of responsibility, self-respect and self-care abilities.

This service targets at children aged 4–18, hoping to provide them with temporary 24-hour family-like residential care until they are able to return home or settle down in another long term residential home placement. Small group homes are mainly located in public housing estates including Sau Mau Ping Estate in Kwun Tong, On Yam Estate in Kwai Chung, Cheung Hang Estate in Tsing Yi, Tin Shui Estate and Tin Yiu Estate in Tin Shui Wai and Lok Man Road in Chai Wan.

The Home creates a home-like environment for children and provides counselling as well as welfare plans for them in which all of these are done by registered social worker. Moreover, it helps children to develop social and self-care skills and provides tutorial classes for them to act as outside classroom supplement.

==== Foster Care Service ====
St. Christopher's Home has established three types of foster care services, each with different objectives to facilitate the functions and underlying purposes of the scheme.

Being able to be brought up with family care and support is essential for children's physical and holistic health, hence these services aim at allowing children to grow up healthily and more importantly, enjoy a stable and sound family life for the protection and promotion their welfare and development.

Children with special needs especially those who are mildly physical or mentally handicapped children and children with health problems are rendered to special foster care services to accommodate their needs.

===== Ordinary Foster Care Service =====
This is designed for children who lacked the basic and sufficient care due to difficult situations and problems that existed in their family such as family financial problems etc. To combat this and allow these children to receive adequate family care and continue a happy family life, they would be placed under the care of foster families until they are able to live on their own, join an adoptive family or their original families' condition allow them to return home.

===== Emergency Foster Care Service =====
This is designed for children who are deterred from adequate family care due to family crisis or emergencies among the family such as child abuse. Similar to ordinary foster care service, these children are arranged to foster families where they could receive family care as well as sheltered under a healthy family life. Not until their original family situation allows them to return home or have they secured a long term residential placement will they be leaving the foster homes.

Together with ordinary foster care services, emergency foster care services are only eligible for children who are 18 years old or below.

===== Day Foster Care Service =====
This service is designed for assisting parents who are unable to take care of their children during daytime due to other obligations such as work duties. Unlike the previous two foster care services, children would be assigned to foster families during the daytime while their parents are away for work and would return home in the evening.

Only children under the age of 10 are accessible to the day foster care services.

===== Services available =====
- Matching: Arranging foster children to appropriate foster families so that they are able to receive adequate family care and live a normal and secure family life.
- Supervision: The Home would also advise, supervise and provide support to foster families so as to ensure the quality of care given to foster children and also the well being of the foster family.
- Counseling: Regular visits from the Social Welfare Department are conducted to provide counselling for foster children to monitor their mental condition. Their individual needs would also be taken care of through welfare plans prepared for them.

=== Pre-primary Education Services ===
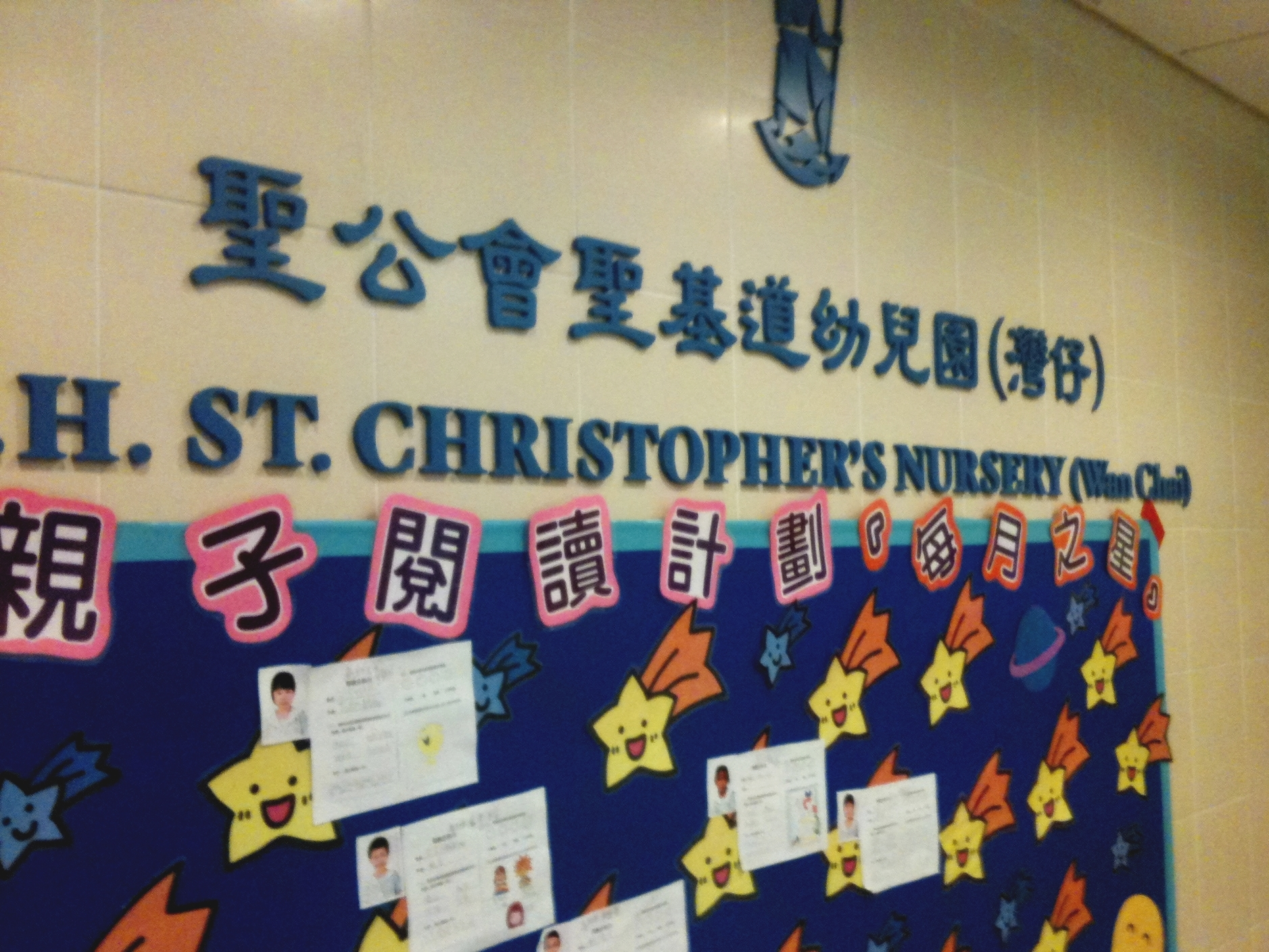
S.K.H.St.Christopher's Nursery (Wan Chai)

Apart from providing physical and mental care services for children who are in need, St. Christopher's Home also engage in education provision. The Home launched pre-school education service programmes for children aged 2–6 in 2006 to enable children in need to get access to primary school preparation. Two nurseries were also established in both Wanchai and Kwai Chung in which each nursery could accommodates around 100 children; providing services to 200 children at their full capacity.

Pre-primary Education Services aim at helping children with their development in problem solving skills as well as multiple intelligence, i.e. interpersonal, intrapersonal, musical, logical-mathematical and verbal linguistic skills. Apart from assisting children in their all-rounded development, the Home also involve in education work to train them to become independent, and help them enrich their communication skills when interacting with different people. On top of that, they aimed at establishing a happy and relaxing learning environment for children to enhance their creativity.

What differentiates the education services provided by the Home from traditional pre-school curriculums is that its emphasis in injecting enjoyable element in educational activities. Visits to different places would be arranged to arouse students' interest as well as fulfilling educational objectives. Computer and information technology learning would also be included in the curriculum to make it more attractive. In seeing the importance of trilingualism in the future society, the Home also provide programmes to enhance the language and communication skills in Cantonese, English as well as Mandarin. Moreover, the schools adopted the continuous assessment policy to keep track of students' performance throughout the school year.

Qualified and experienced pre-school education professionals certified with degree and diploma level in pre-school education would be teaching students to ensure the teaching quality.

=== Children Health Development Services ===
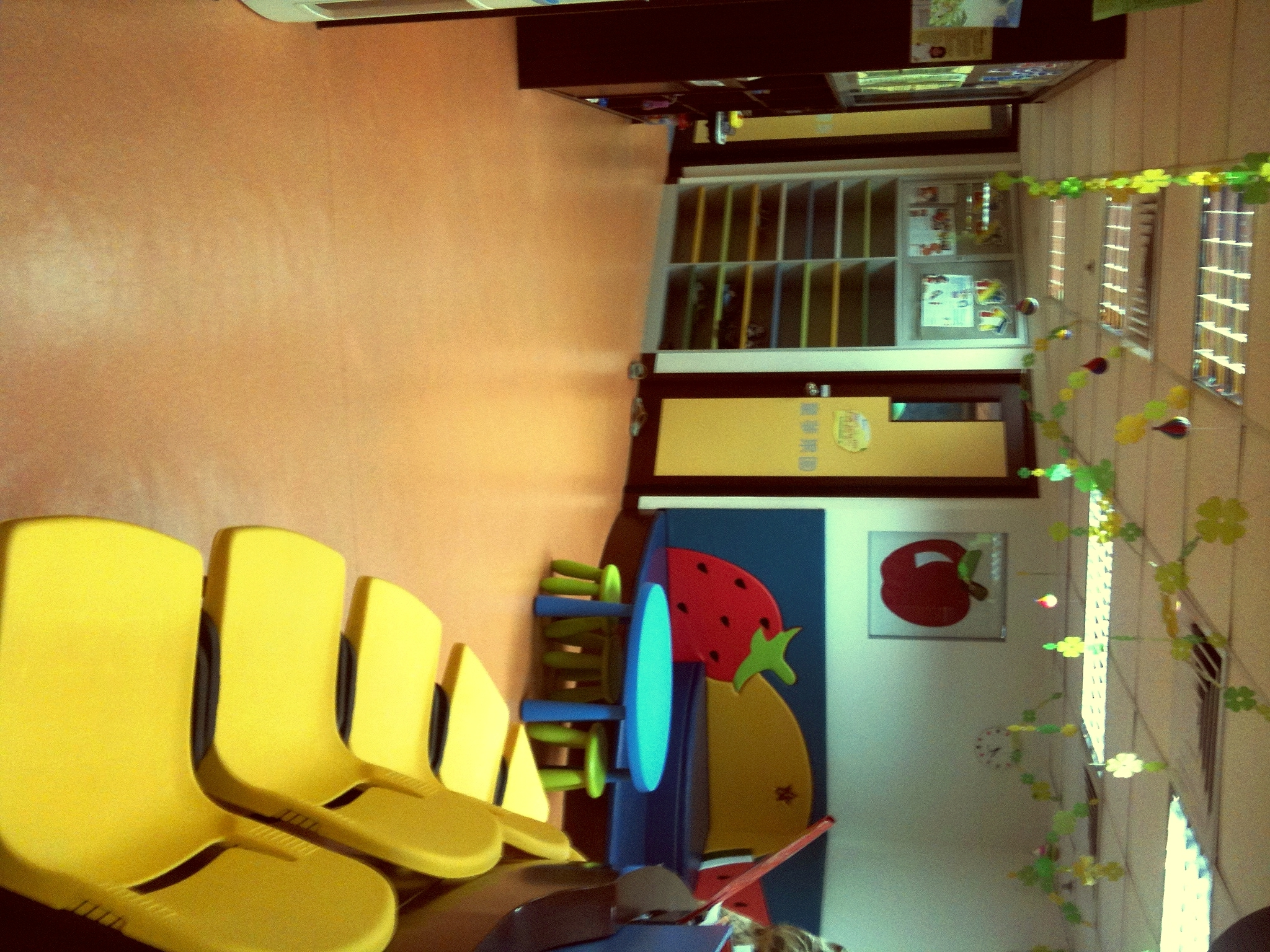
Kidsmind

Health does not only refer to the absence of disease of a physical body or access to nutritious food, it also includes the well being of a person's mental state and social life. In view of this, the Home has launched a programme called "Kidsmind" aiming at promoting the welfare and health care of children.

==== Kidsmind ====
Kidsmind was launched not only to merely promote the health care of children, but they also targeted at providing comprehensive health information and establishing a healthy living environment for children.

Children aged 0 –12, parents and care givers are hoped to benefit from this programme.

A comprehensive set of services are available for target groups to enjoy, namely:

- Health guidance and training services for children
- Health assessment and integrated intervention for children
- School-based and community-based health education
- Children health surveys
- Children health promotion activities
- Children health educational kits
- Health talks, seminars, workshops and playgroups

=== Project for New Arrivals ===
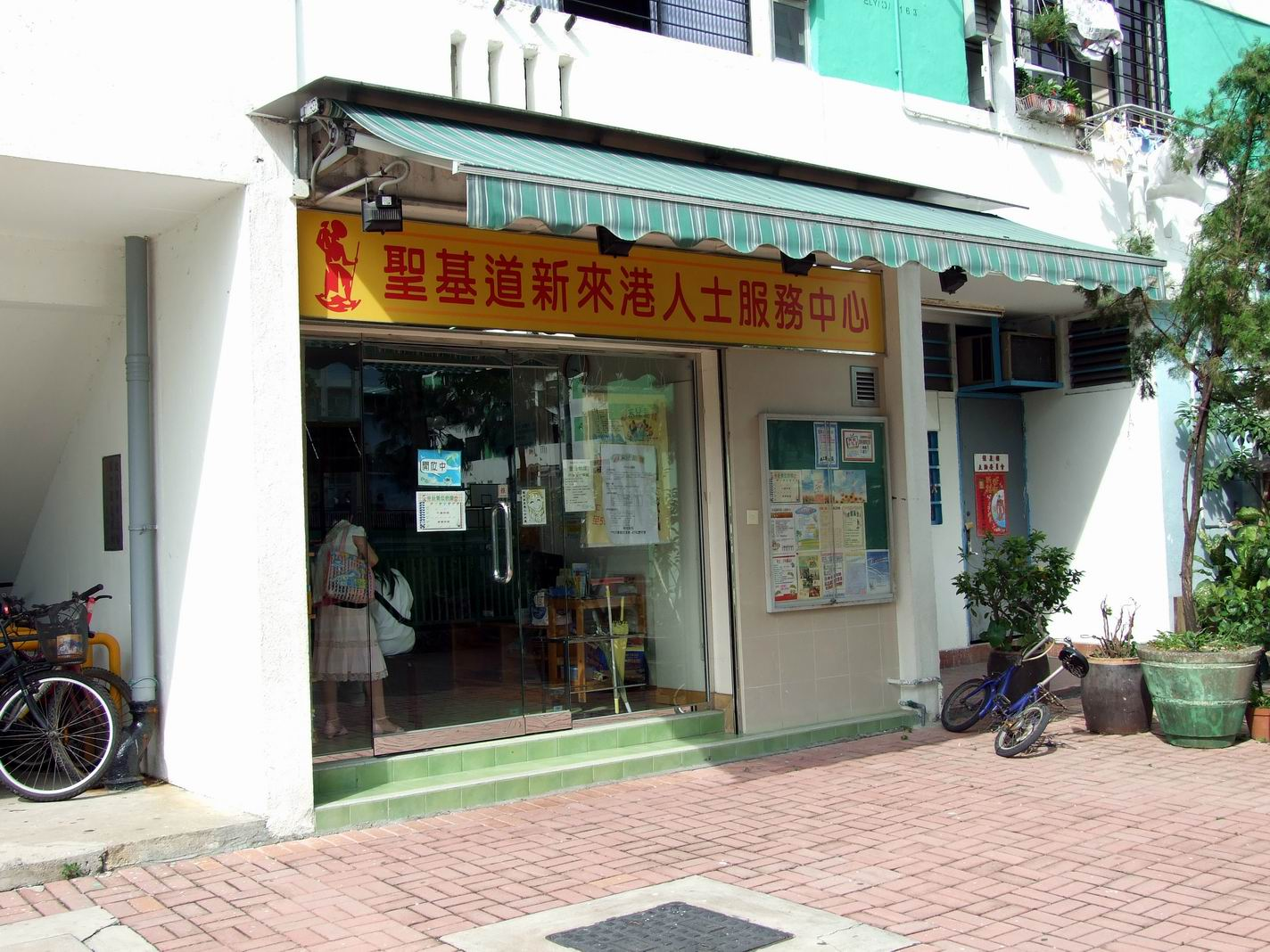
Project for New Arrivals in Shatin

With the large inflow of new arrivals (NA), supporting services in all kinds are in great demand. In October 1999, the Home launched the Project for New Arrivals in Shatin so as to provide various supporting services to the new arrival children and their families. Eligible beneficiaries are those NA migrated to Hong Kong within four years. The home provides an environment for after-school activities where new arrival children can catch up on their English and computer skills and make friends.

The Project aim at guiding NA to adapt to the new lives in Hong Kong, reinforcing family and all kinds of supportive network of the NA, as well as cultivating a harmonic atmosphere amongst the NA and local citizens. The service targets are approached actively in a dynamic way. Comprehensive services are provided such as information for community resources, adjustment programs, support groups, integration programs, counselling and referrals. The project also train mainland mothers in Hong Kong to teach Putonghua and thus increase their self-esteem and sense of independence.

=== Clinical Psychological Services ===
This serves as a platform for comprehensive psychological assessment and intervention service to members of the Home including the staff with professional support. It aims at providing for children comprehensive psychological assessment, diagnosis and intervention service. On top of that, it supports staff through facilitating multi-disciplinary and offering professional staff supporting programs, and providing case consultations and counselling services to them.

The Services are extensive programs including individualised psychological assessment and diagnosis, individualised counselling, group therapy, case consultations, skill training talks and workshops and psychological education.

== Support ==
=== "Lok-lok and Yiu-yiu" Sponsorship Scheme ===
The public can provide support to this organisation by simply bringing vibrant colours to the dreary lives of the children by donations. There is a sponsorship scheme called "Lok-lok & Yiu-yiu" Sponsorship Scheme. Regular donors who contribute at least HK$50 per month or $600 per year would be entitled a pair of dolls called "Lok-lok & Yiu Yiu" as souvenir. The contributions will be designated for providing accommodation, academic support, emotional counselling, development opportunities and horizon-broaden activities and community support for the children from broken families and low-income groups.

=== Children Emergency Fund ===
Children of the Home are facing complicated difficulties due to the growing acuteness of family problems and society problems. This fund serves to provide aid to the needy children of the Home upon urgent and sudden incidents.

=== Voluntary Specialist Recruitment Scheme ===
Everyone can lend a hand to children to live a life of fullness by being volunteers of the Home. The "Voluntary Specialist Recruitment Scheme", recruiting voluntary helpers with special talents such as photography, video production, home design, graphic design, translation, communication, database management, etc. was set up for eagar youths who wish to assist in the activities organised by the Home. Applications for individual volunteers aged 21 or above, who are mature and independent, are welcomed to join in the big family.

Also, general donation and charity sales activities aiming at improving the general service quality and expanding further services to the Home are organised. On top of that, designated use of donation according to donor's specific desire or preference are also available within the organisation.

== Publications ==
1. Helping Parents to Improve and Level Up the 8 Types of Intelligence of Children (published in July 2007)
  Introduction: Through daily activities and interaction, parents can always help their children in developing and improving the eight intelligence of children namely: Language, Mathematical and logical solving, physical movements, Nature Observation, Interpersonal skills, Visual Ability, Music and Self Conscience. By very simple and inexpensive methods, it helps children to build up their confidence as well as igniting their inner abilities. This book recorded different methods and experiences from other parents on these aspects.
1. Healthy Lesson Package (published in March 2007)
  Introduction: It is important for children to adopt a healthy life style when they are young. The package is divided into 7 parts: Food and drinks, Sports, Rest, Personal Hygiene, Emotions, Friends and Healthy Learning. Each part provides eight activities and interactive games to teach children about health.
1. ‘Health follows me’ Exercise Package (published in March 2006)
  Introduction: According to a research from the World Health Organization, it is estimated that 35 million people died due to chronic disease. One major cause for chronic disease is lack of exercise. Exercise is very important to healthy life. In view of this, the Home published this package to provide interesting and convenient ways to do exercise, and at the same time promotes the importance of regular exercise.
1. Children Study: Move Move, Run More! Impact on Psychomotor and Self-Worth Development (published in December 2005)
  Introduction: This publication aims at promoting health issues to children as well as the importance of exercise in leading a healthy and balanced life. From a recent research of children’s health, obese problem among children is getting serious in Hong Kong due to the lack of exercise and the fast food diet they are adopting every now and then. From 2004 February to June, the Baptist University did a research about the volume of exercise done by primary school student. The research aims at raising the concern about the issue and encourages children to participate more in sports.

== Criticisms ==
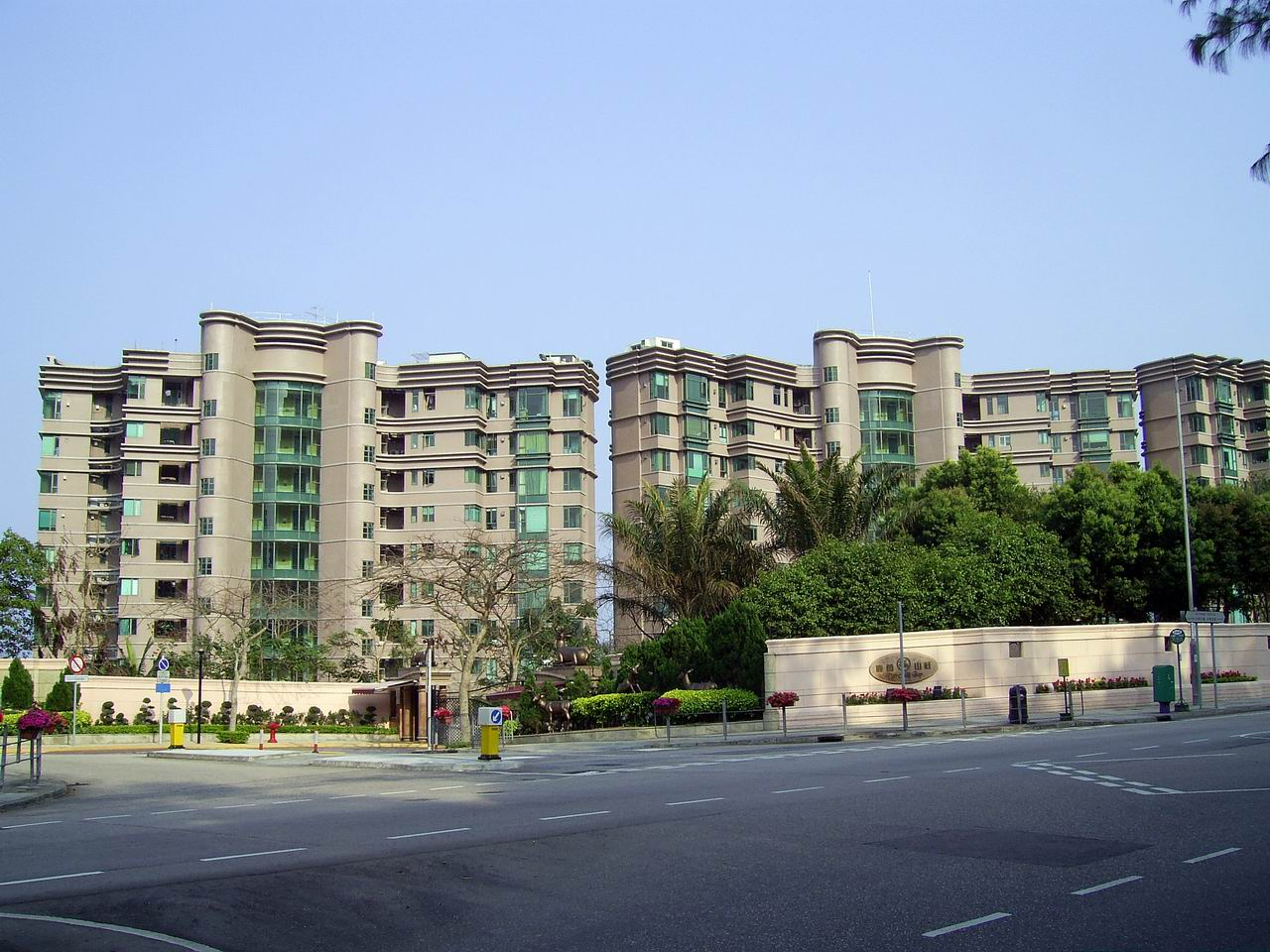
Deerhill Bay

In a ruling on 27 January 2010, the Court of First Instance upheld a Board of Review decision that Hong Kong Sheng Kung Hui was liable for profit tax amounted for HK$180 million on Deerhill Bay project. This project was launched under a joint venture set up by both Hong Kong Sheng Kung Hui and Cheung Kong Holdings in 1993. In return, the church could receive 129 apartments and 94 parking spaces from the developer according to their agreement.

By 2006, Hong Kong Sheng Kung Hui had made HK$1.119 billion from the properties' sale. Before the site underwent redevelopment, the land had been occupied by an orphanage, the S.K.H. St. Christopher's Home, for almost 50 years from 1935. In the mid 1980s, the Hong Kong government decided the reallocation of the home.

In the appeal, Anthony Neoh SC, for the church, claimed that all the received money coming from the Deerhill Bay project had been used for charitable purposes only. However, the court held that the church had failed to prove it. The Hong Kong Council of Social Service says that it is necessary for all government-subsidized non-government organisations to return audit reports to the Social Welfare Department every year and Deerhill Bay's case served as an important reminder to all welfare groups. In addition, The profit generated has to be used for charity to qualify for tax exemption.

== See also ==
- Hong Kong Sheng Kung Hui
