= Ronald Hall =

Anglican missionary bishop (1895–1975)

The Right Reverend Ronald Owen Hall CMG, MC & Bar
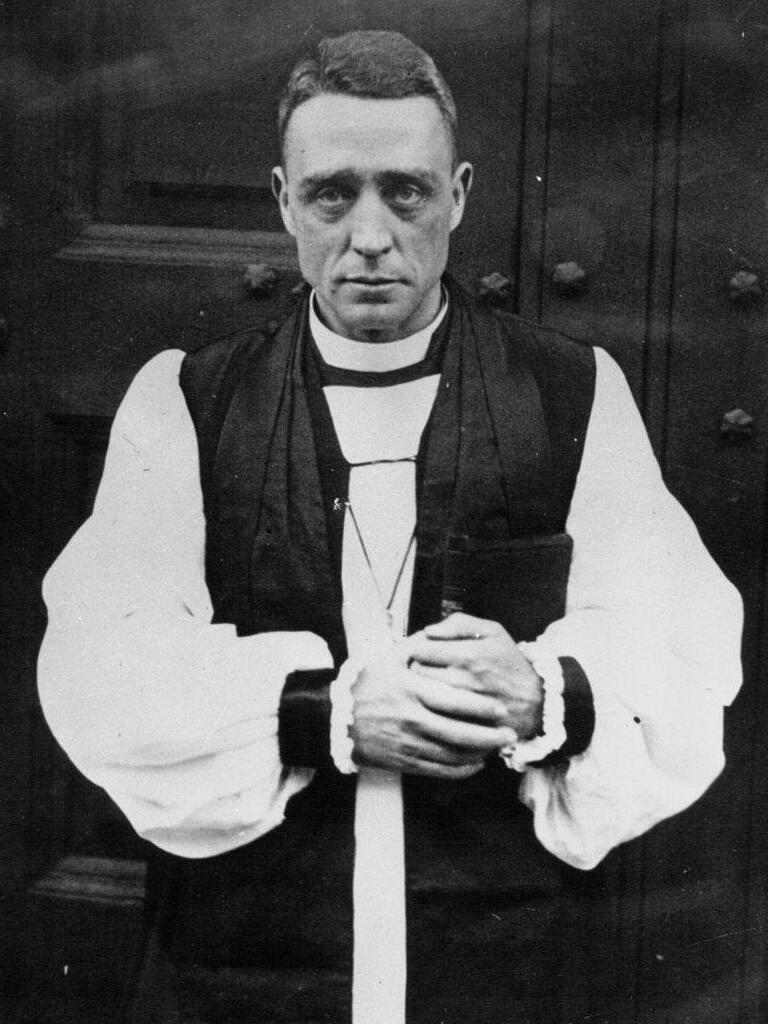
- Province: Anglican-Episcopal Province of China
- Diocese: Victoria (1932–51); Hong Kong and Macau
- Installed: 30 December 1932
- Predecessor: Charles Ridley Duppuy (Diocese of Victoria)
- Successor: Gilbert Baker (Diocese of Hong Kong and Macau)

Orders
- Ordination: 1925
- Consecration: 1932

Personal details
- Born: 22 July 1895 Newcastle upon Tyne
- Died: 22 April 1975 (aged 79) Lewknor, Oxfordshire
- Buried: St Margaret's Lewknor, Oxfordshire
- Denomination: Anglican
- Education: Royal Grammar School, Newcastle, and Bromsgrove School.

Ronald Owen Hall CMG MC* (Chinese: 何明華; Jyutping: Ho Ming Wah; pinyin: Hé Mínghuá; 22 July 1895 in Newcastle upon Tyne – 22 April 1975 in Lewknor, Oxfordshire) was an English Anglican missionary bishop in Hong Kong and China in the mid 20th century. As an emergency measure during the Second World War, with China under Japanese occupation, he ordained Florence Li Tim-Oi as the first woman priest in the Anglican Communion.

Hall had just finished his schooling when the First World War broke out, during which he served as an infantry and staff officer. He was decorated with the Military Cross and Bar, and rose to the rank of major. After the war he took a shortened degree course at the University of Oxford, and made his first visit to China for a student Christian conference in 1922. After a period as a parish priest in his native Newcastle, he became Bishop of Victoria, Hong Kong in 1932, remaining in Hong Kong until his retirement in 1966. He and his wife then settled in Oxfordshire.

== Early life ==
Hall was born on 22 July 1895 in Newcastle, England. He was the second child (and eldest son) of an Anglican clergyman, Cecil Gallopine Hall, who was then Curate of St Andrew's Newcastle, and his wife Constance Gertrude (née Upcher, herself the daughter of another clergyman). Hall was educated at the Royal Grammar School, Newcastle, and Bromsgrove School.

== War service ==
With the outbreak of the First World War, he joined the Northumberland Fusiliers. He was commissioned as a second lieutenant on 10 December 1914 for service with the 18th (1st Tyneside) Battalion, one of the "Pals battalions" raised as part of Lord Kitchener's New Armies. He was promoted to temporary captain on 1 April 1915. He was transferred to 15th (Nottingham) Battalion, Sherwood Foresters on 9 July 1915, and subsequently to the General List with the same date, having been appointed a staff captain. On 7 June 1916 he was appointed a General Staff Officer, 3rd Grade. On 7 April 1917 he was appointed brigade major, reputedly the youngest in the British Army. He was appointed General Staff Officer, 2nd Grade, with the temporary rank of major, on 14 October 1918. He relinquished his commission on 16 January 1919. He was awarded the Military Cross in the 1918 New Year Honours, and a Bar to the medal in the 1919 New Year Honours.

== Early ministry ==
After the war, Hall took his degree at Brasenose College, Oxford, on the shortened degree course run in the immediate post-war years. He became a leader of the British Student Christian Movement and was appointed to the national staff in 1920. Hall attended the World's Student Christian Federation conference in Peking in 1922. He became friends with young Chinese Christian leaders, including the evangelist T. Z. Koo (Gu Ziren) and Y. T. Wu, the founder of the Three-Self Patriotic Movement in China.

Ordained deacon in 1920 in Newcastle Cathedral and priest in Southwark Cathedral in 1921 for work with the Student Christian Movement, Hall later became vicar of St Luke's Newcastle upon Tyne.

== Bishop of Hong Kong ==
In 1932 he was appointed Bishop of Victoria, Hong Kong, and then from 1951 of the smaller Diocese of Hong Kong and Macau, retiring in 1966. He was consecrated a bishop on 28 October 1932, by Cosmo Lang, Archbishop of Canterbury, at St Paul's Cathedral.

=== Social engagement ===
Hall was described as a "legendary figure" with a "burning compassion for the less privileged". He emphasised the needs of ordinary people, especially victims of social upheaval. As Bishop of Hong Kong, he advocated for the poor and supported the Chinese Communist Revolution. Before World War II, Hall established an orphanage in Tai Po, Hong Kong, which later became the St Christopher's Home. He was also instrumental in the setting up of the Hong Kong Housing Society. Under his leadership, the Anglican Church became a major partner with the Hong Kong government in provision of social services.

=== Ordination of first woman priest ===
While Bishop of Hong Kong, Hall ordained the first woman priest in the Anglican Communion. The Japanese occupation of Hong Kong and of parts of China had made it impossible for Anglican priests to get to neutral Macau, where there were a number of refugee Anglicans with no priest. Florence Li Tim-Oi had already been made a deaconess in Macau by Hall and had been authorised by him and his assistant to give the sacraments to the Anglicans in these extenuating circumstances. In January 1944, Li travelled through Japanese-occupied territory to the small town of Hsinxing, as yet unoccupied by the Japanese, to meet with Hall; from there they proceeded to Shaoqing where he regularised her administration of the sacraments by ordaining her as a priest on 25 January 1944. The Archbishop of Canterbury at the time, William Temple, confided to others his conflicting views but he felt compelled to take a public stand against it.

When the war ended in 1945, Li, to avoid controversy, gave up her licence as a priest, though never renounced her ordination. At the provincial synod of the Chung Hua Sheng Kung Hui in Shanghai in 1947, Hall tried but failed to receive retroactive approval in canon law for Li's ordination. In 1948, Hall was awarded the Order of Brilliant Star with Plaque by Chiang Kai-shek.

== Retirement and legacy ==
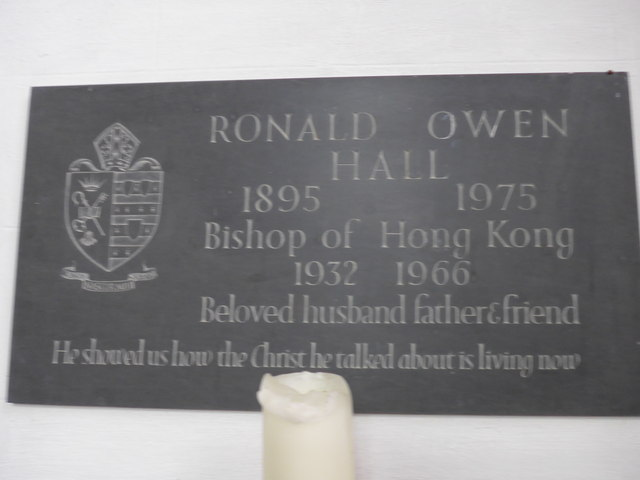
Memorial plaque in St Margaret's Lewknor

Hall retired in 1966 and was succeeded as bishop by Gilbert Baker. Hall would subsequently be recognised throughout Hong Kong and England:

- References to Hall can be seen around Hong Kong. The Anglican seminary in Hong Kong, Ming Hua Theological College, and one of the student hostels of Chung Chi College, Chinese University of Hong Kong, Ming Hua Tang, (Note: Hall was one of the founders of Chung Chi College.) are both named after him.
- In 1965, the University of Hong Kong awarded him the Doctor of Divinity (honoris causa).
- In the 1966 Queen's Birthday Honours, Queen Elizabeth appointed Hall Companion of the Order of St Michael and St George (CMG).
- The Bishop Ho Ming Wah Chinese Centre was opened in London in 1987.

Hall's Chinese given names, Ming Wah / Minghua, may be translated as “understands the Chinese people”.

== Criticism ==
Due to his close connections with Christian leaders in China, he was accused of being deeply influenced by Chinese communists. For example, the governor of Hong Kong Alexander Grantham (1947–57) commented that one of the Hall's foundations, Bishop's Worker Schools, was "completely communist-dominated and centres of communist and anti-British indoctrination."

== See also ==
- Florence Li Tim-Oi
- Hong Kong Sheng Kung Hui

== Writing ==
- Hall, Ronald O. (1942). The Art of the Missionary: Fellow Workers with the Church in China. London: Student Christian Movement Press.

Anglican Communion titles
Preceded by Ridley Duppuy	Bishop of Victoria; 1932–1951	Diocese abolished
New diocese	Bishop of Hong Kong and Macau; 1951–1966	Succeeded by Gilbert Baker
