= St. Catharine's School for Girls (Kwun Tong) =

Secondary school in Hong Kong

Coordinates: 22.3191°N 114.2195°E

- Traditional Chinese: 聖傑靈女子中學
- Simplified Chinese: 圣杰灵女子中学
Transcriptions
Standard Mandarin
- Hanyu Pinyin: Shèng Jiélíng Nǚzǐ Zhōngxué
Yue: Cantonese
- Jyutping: sing3 git6 ling4 neoi5 zi2 zung1 hok6

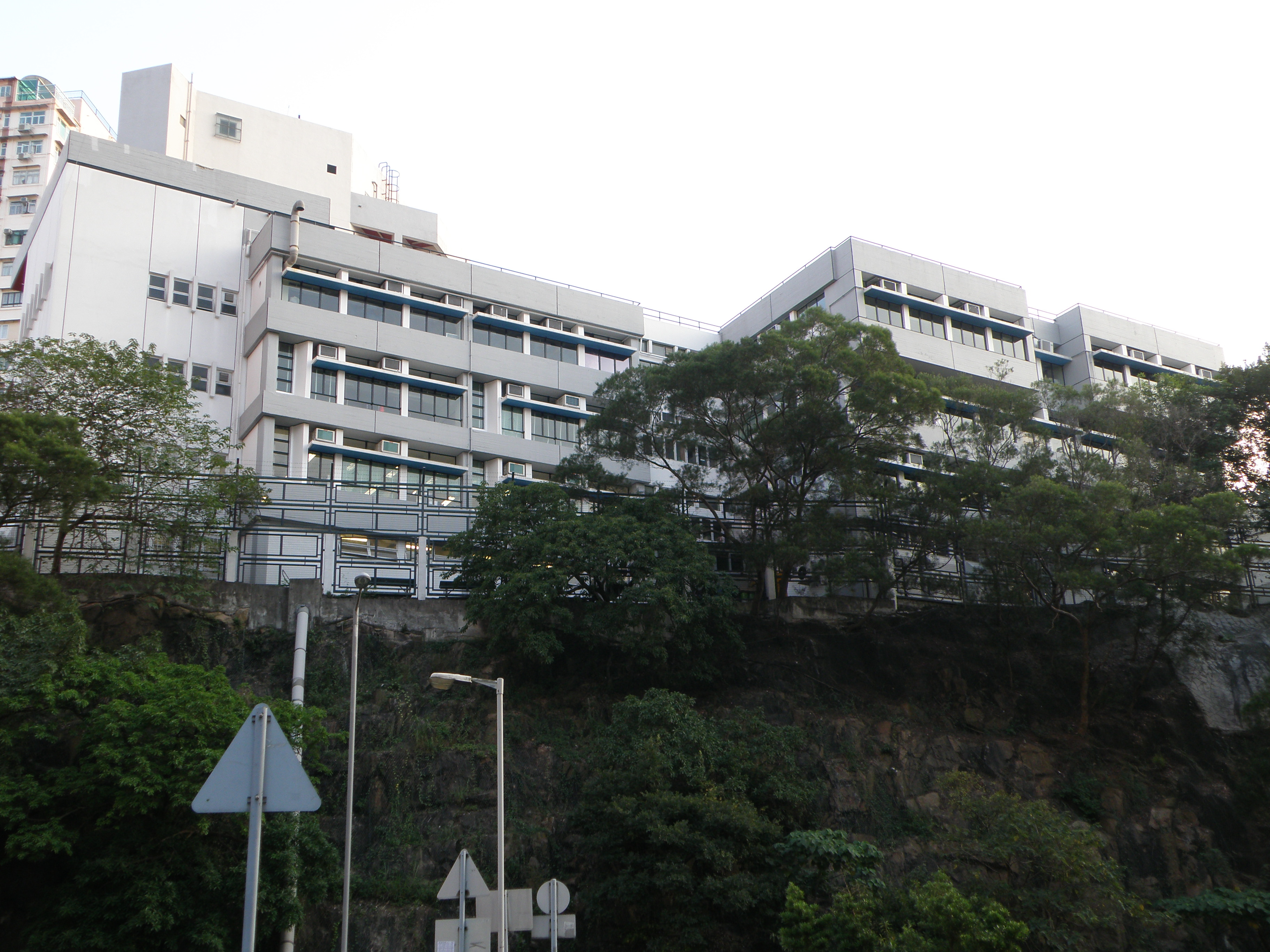
St Catharine's School for Girls

St Catharine's School for Girls (Chinese: 聖傑靈女子中學) is located in Hong Lee Road, Kwun Tong, Hong Kong. It is a girls' secondary school.

== History ==
The school was established by its first principal, The Revd. Joyce M. Bennett, who was contacted by the Education Department in 1965. Ms. Bennett first visited the school site at Ngok Yue Shan in late 1965. As the government first requested an establishment of 24 classes in the school, Ms. Bennett then planned to set up four different subjects (Arts, Science, Commerce and Technical) to satisfy the government. Ms. Bennett retired in 1983 and returned to the UK.

== The school name ==
The name originally proposed for the school was "St. Anne's", St Anne being the mother of the Blessed Virgin Mary. But the Chinese members of the school organizing committee thought that the name is not good when translated into Chinese. After a long search, Ms, Bennett proposed the name "St. Catharine's", after Catharine of Alexandria, the patroness of young women, wheelwrights, attorneys, and scholars. She was considered to be a particularly appropriate model for a school which was to combine academic and technical education. St Catharine's feast day, 25 November, was considered a suitable day for school celebration.

Its Chinese name "傑靈" comes from the ancient Chinese proverb "人傑地靈", meaning "Outstanding people make sacred land."

== Principals ==
- The Revd. Dr. Joyce M Bennett，O.B.E. (1968–1983)
- Mrs. Lau Li Kwok Kin, Clara (1983–1994)
- Dr. Sun Pong Tak Ling (1994–2008)
- Mrs. Ip Au Tak Hing (January – August 1994, September 2005 – July 2006)
- Ms. Heung Yuk Mui (2008–2024)
- Mr. Kwan Chi Kuen (2024-present)

== Class names ==
The school set up five Form One classes in September 1968. Ms Bennett considered it unwise to name the five classes with 'A' to 'E' since it may lead to the misconception that the classes are ranked according to the quality of the students. Eventually, Ms Bennett picked five women from The New Testament and their names were adopted:

- Mary: A woman who was attentive to Jesus' teaching,
- Martha: a busy cook,
- Dorcas: a tailor,
- Priscilla: a tent-maker, and
- Phoebe: a deaconess

These women were all considered good role models for the girls.
