= Ridley Duppuy =

British Anglican bishop (1881–1944)

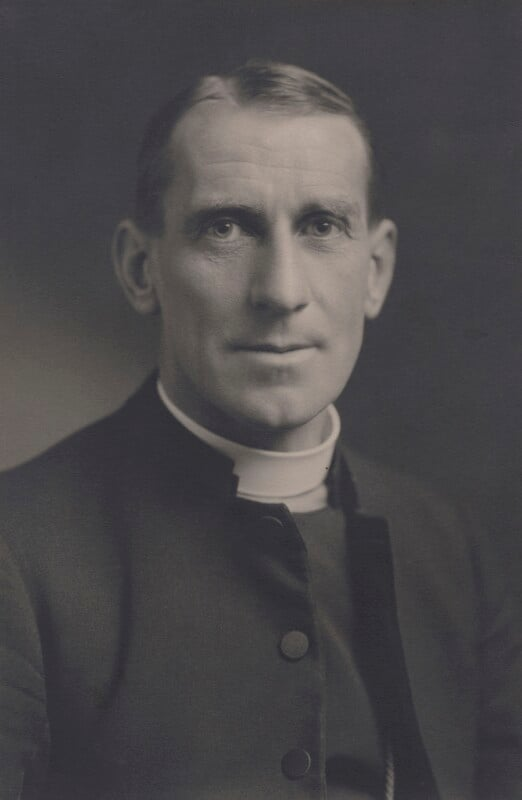
Duppuy, 1920s–1930s

Charles Ridley Duppuy (杜培義, 22 September 1881 – 26 September 1944) was a British Anglican priest who served as Bishop of Victoria, Hong Kong from 1920 to 1932.

== Early life and career ==
He was born on 22 September 1881, the son of a priest (C. Duppuy), and educated at Keble College, Oxford.

He was ordained in 1904 (the last year before the Diocese of Birmingham was founded) and his first post was as a curate in Aston; after which he was Vicar of Christchurch, Bradford.

== Chaplain ==
Duppuy was released from his post in Bradford to serve for 13 months as a Temporary Chaplain to the Forces from January 1918. He was described in his interview with the Chaplain-General as ‘manly, quick, keen...’ and was posted to France attached to the 42nd Division Royal Artillery. A Report described him as a priest of great energy and boundless enthusiasm. He had organising ability and was businesslike and very conscientious ‘a wonderful influence amongst officers and men. One of the best chaplains in the army’. The Deputy Chaplain-General was less laudatory regarding Duppuy as ‘satisfactory’ and ‘No great speaker or preacher’. Duppuy was demobilised in March, 1919.

== Bishop ==
Appointed Bishop of Victoria, Hong Kong in 1920, he was consecrated into bishop's orders on St John the Baptist's Day 1920 (24 June), by Randall Davidson, Archbishop of Canterbury, at St Paul's Cathedral. He resigned in 1932 to take up an appointment in Britain as a Canon residentiary of Worcester Cathedral; he remained Canon until his death, but added to it the posts of Assistant Bishop of Worcester from 1936, Archdeacon of Worcester from 1938 and Vice-Dean of the cathedral from 1940. He died on 26 September 1944.

Religious titles
Preceded by Gerard Lander	Bishop of Victoria; 1920–1932	Succeeded by Ronald Hall
