= Diocese of Hong Kong Island =

Diocese of Sheng Kung Hui

Diocese of Hong Kong Island 香港島教區
- Coat of arms

Location
- Territory: Hong Kong Island; Outlying islands
- Ecclesiastical province: Hong Kong
- Headquarters: St. Stephen's Church

Statistics
- Parishes: 10
- Churches: 16
- Schools: 33

Information
- Denomination: Anglican
- Rite: Use of Salisbury
- Established: 22 September 1998
- Cathedral: St. John's Cathedral

Current leadership
- Bishop: Matthias Der
- Dean: Kwok-keung Chan
- Bishops emeritus: Paul Kwong 2007–2021, Peter Kwong 1981–2007

Website
- dhk.hkskh.org

Diocese of Hong Kong Island
- Traditional Chinese: 香港島教區
- Simplified Chinese: 香港岛教区
- Cantonese Yale: hēung góng dóu gaau kūi
Transcriptions
Standard Mandarin
- Hanyu Pinyin: Xiānggǎng Dǎo Jiàoqū
Yue: Cantonese
- Yale Romanization: hēung góng dóu gaau kūi
- Jyutping: hoeng1 gong2 dou2 gaau3 keoi1

The Diocese of Hong Kong Island is one of the three dioceses under the Hong Kong Sheng Kung Hui, a province of the Anglican Communion. Its territory covers Hong Kong Island and the outlying islands. The cathedral of the diocese, St. John's Cathedral, is the oldest surviving Western ecclesiastical building in Hong Kong. It was constructed in the 1840s.

The incumbent Bishop of Hong Kong Island, Matthias Der, was consecrated as bishop on 3 October 2020 and enthroned on 2 January 2021. Der succeeded Paul Kwong as bishop of the diocese, who served concurrently as Archbishop and Primate of Hong Kong.

== Churches ==
The diocese oversees over 16 churches and chapels across Hong Kong Island and the outlying islands of Hong Kong.

=== Parishes ===
- St. John's Cathedral, Central
- St. Stephen's Church, Sai Wan
- Holy Nativity Church, Shau Kei Wan
- St. Peter's Church, North Point
- St. Mary's Church, Causeway Bay
- St. James' Church, Wan Chai
- St. Paul's Church, Mid-Levels
- St. Matthew's Church, Sheung Wan
- St. Luke's Church, Kennedy Town
- St. Timothy's Church, Pok Fu Lam

=== Missions ===
- Grace Church, Stanley
- Church of the Incarnation, Discovery Bay
- Church of the Ascension, Tung Chung
- Discovery Bay Church
- St. Stephen's Chapel (located in St. Stephen's College), Stanley
- Emmanuel Church (located in George C. Tso Memorial Chapel of the defunct Béthanie Sanatorium), Pok Fu Lam

== Bishops ==
1. Peter Kwong Kong-kit (1998–2007)
2. Paul Kwong (2007–2021)
3. Matthias Clement Tze-wo Der (2021–present)

== Gallery ==
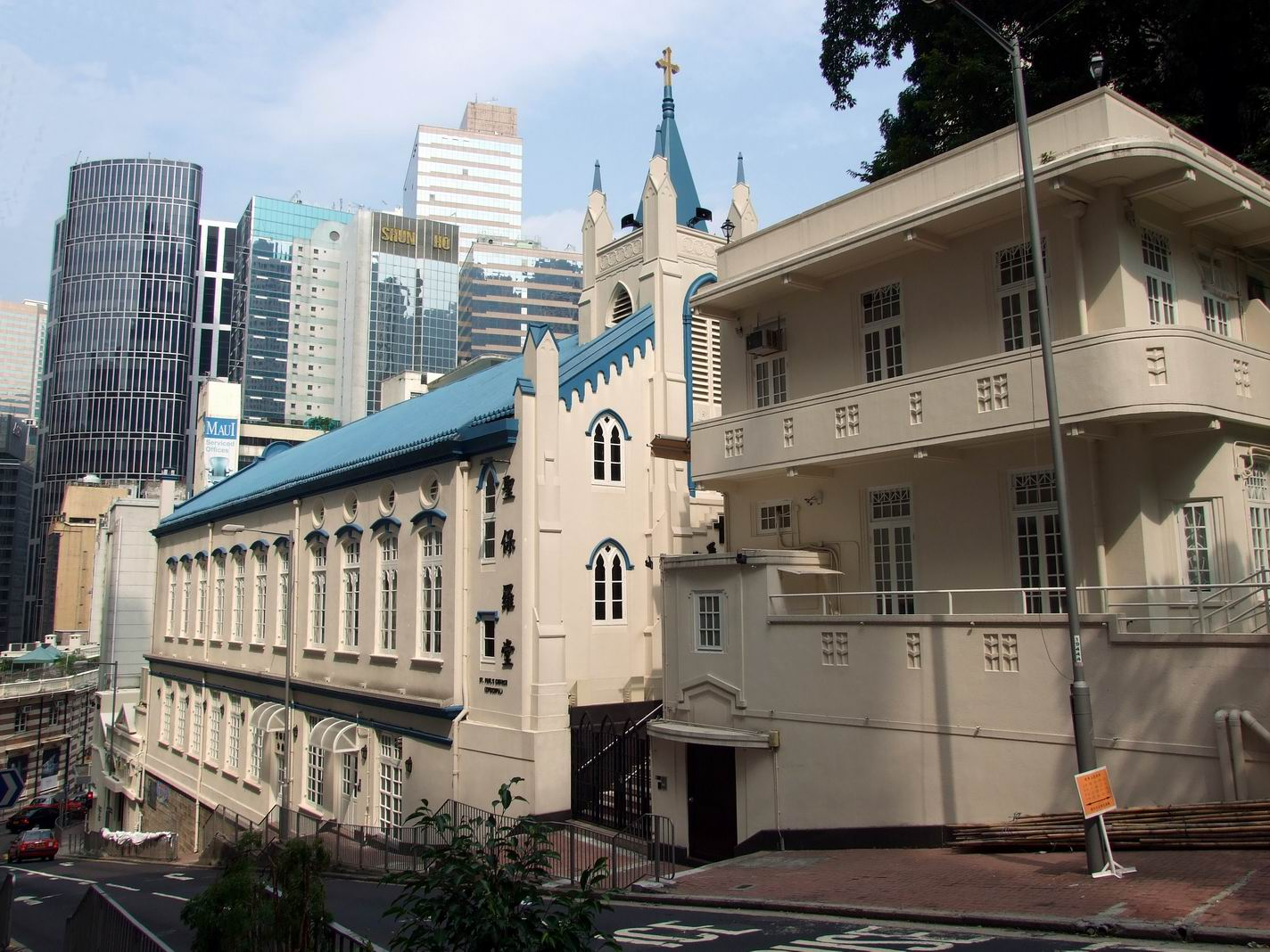
St. Paul's Church

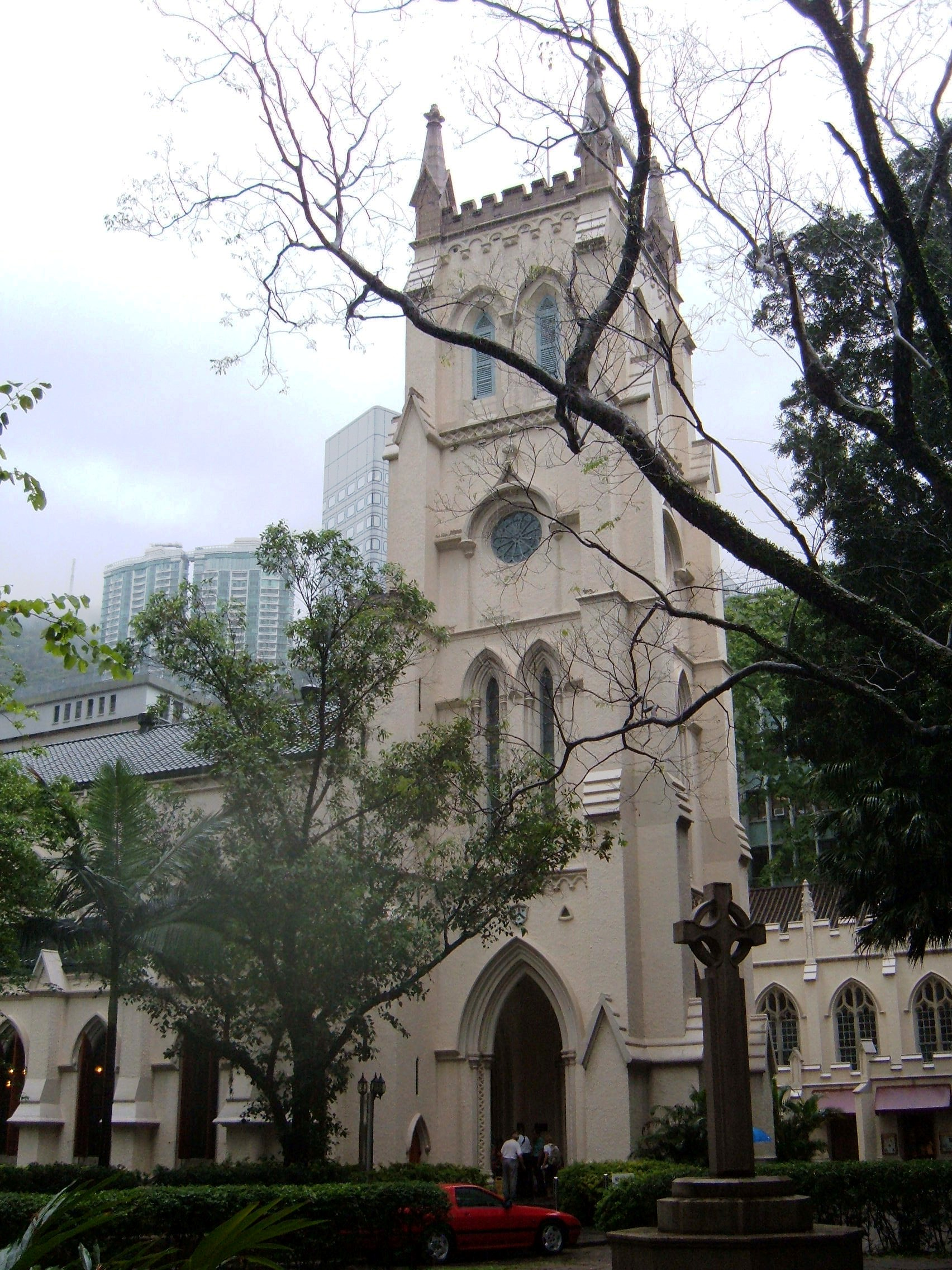
St. John's Cathedral

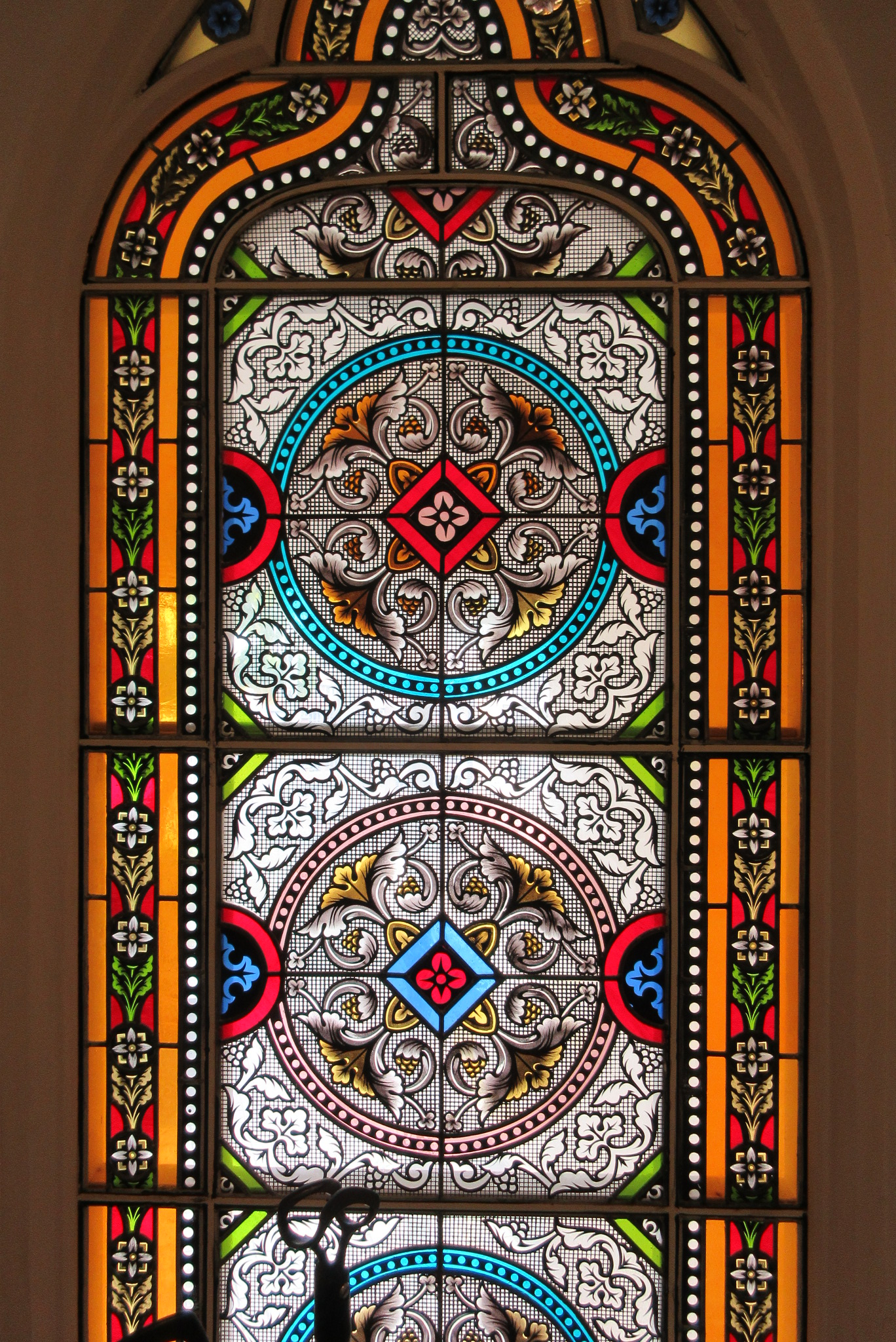
Emmanuel Church

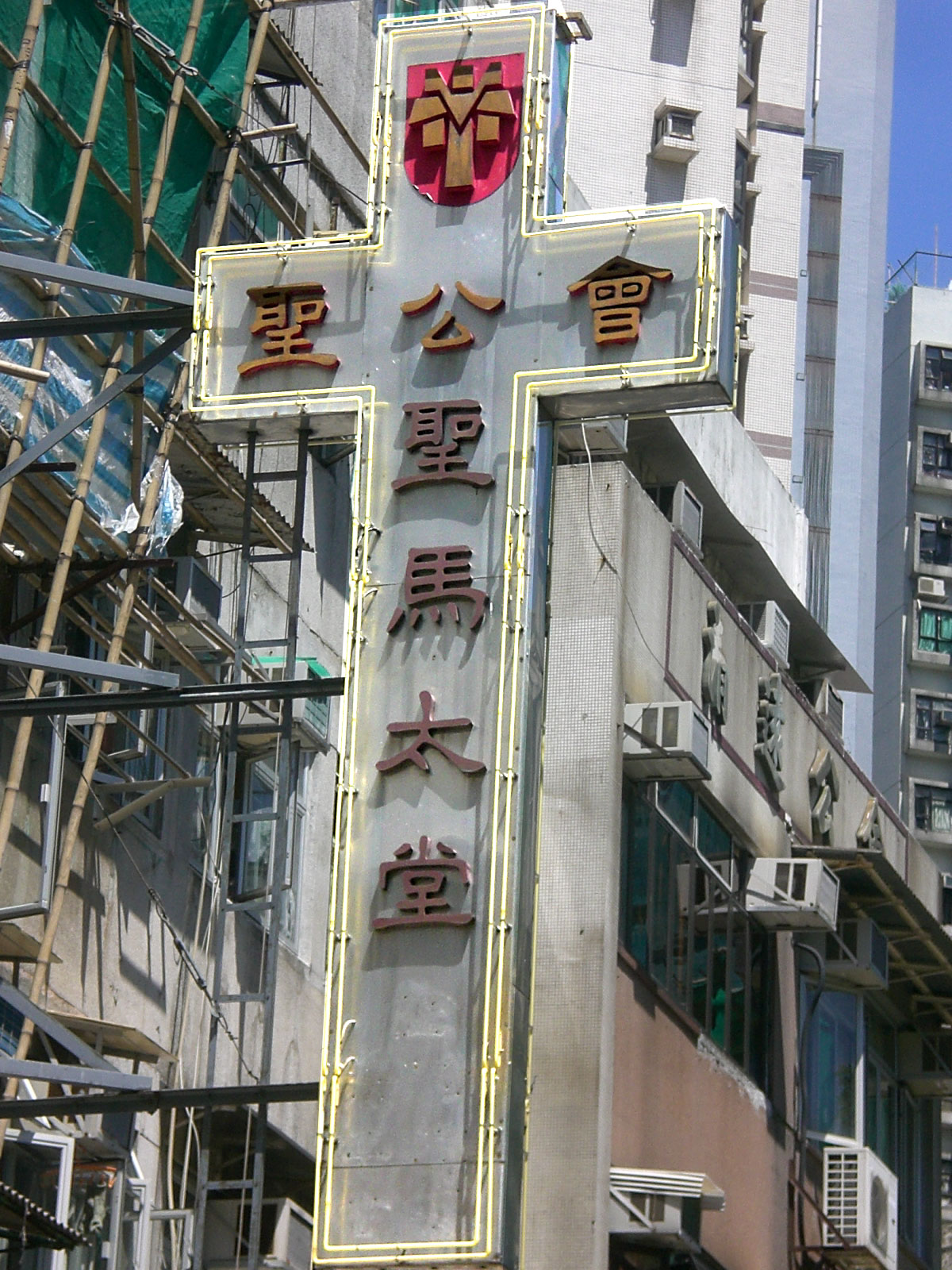
St. Matthew's Church

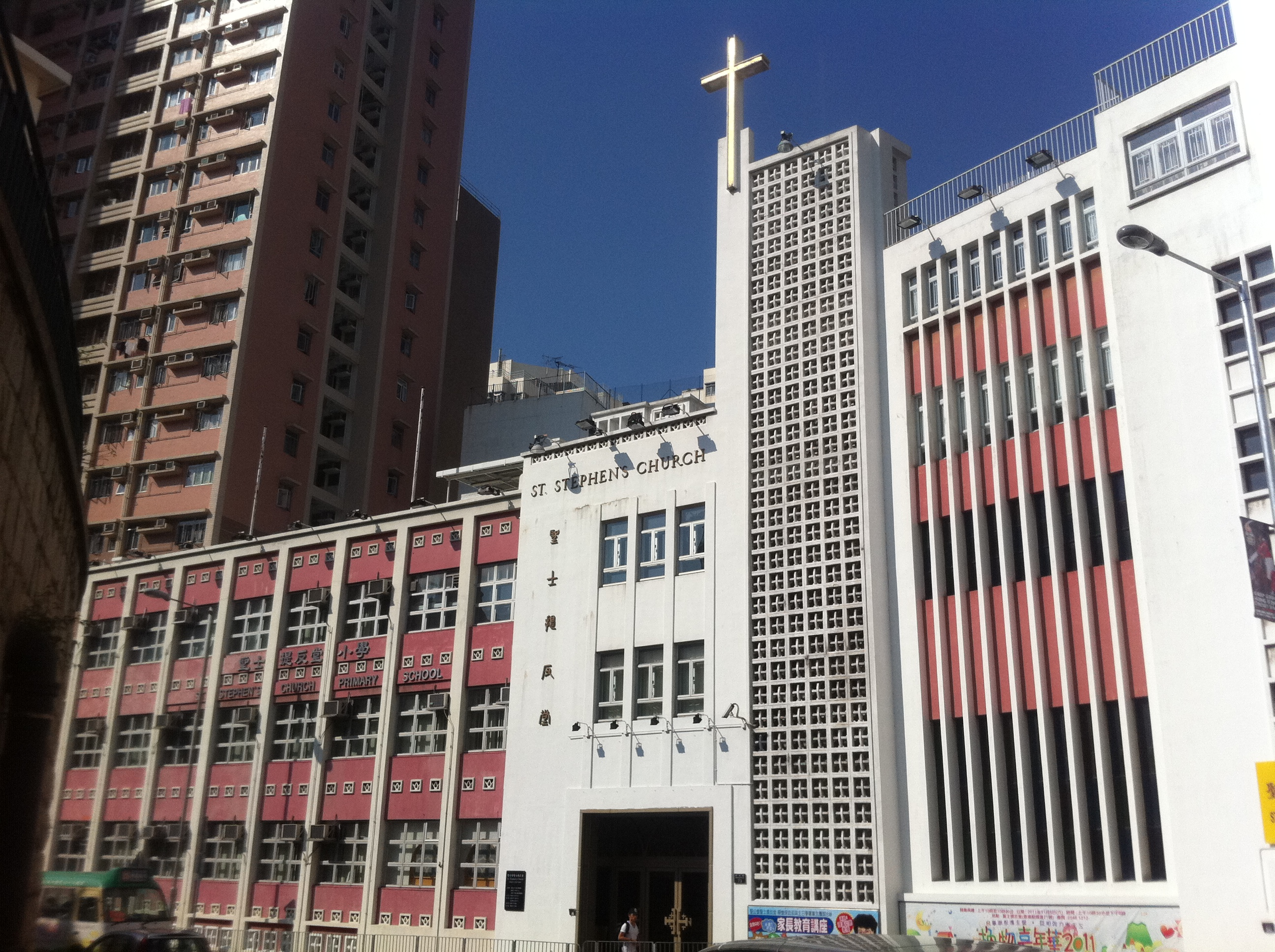
St. Stephen's Church

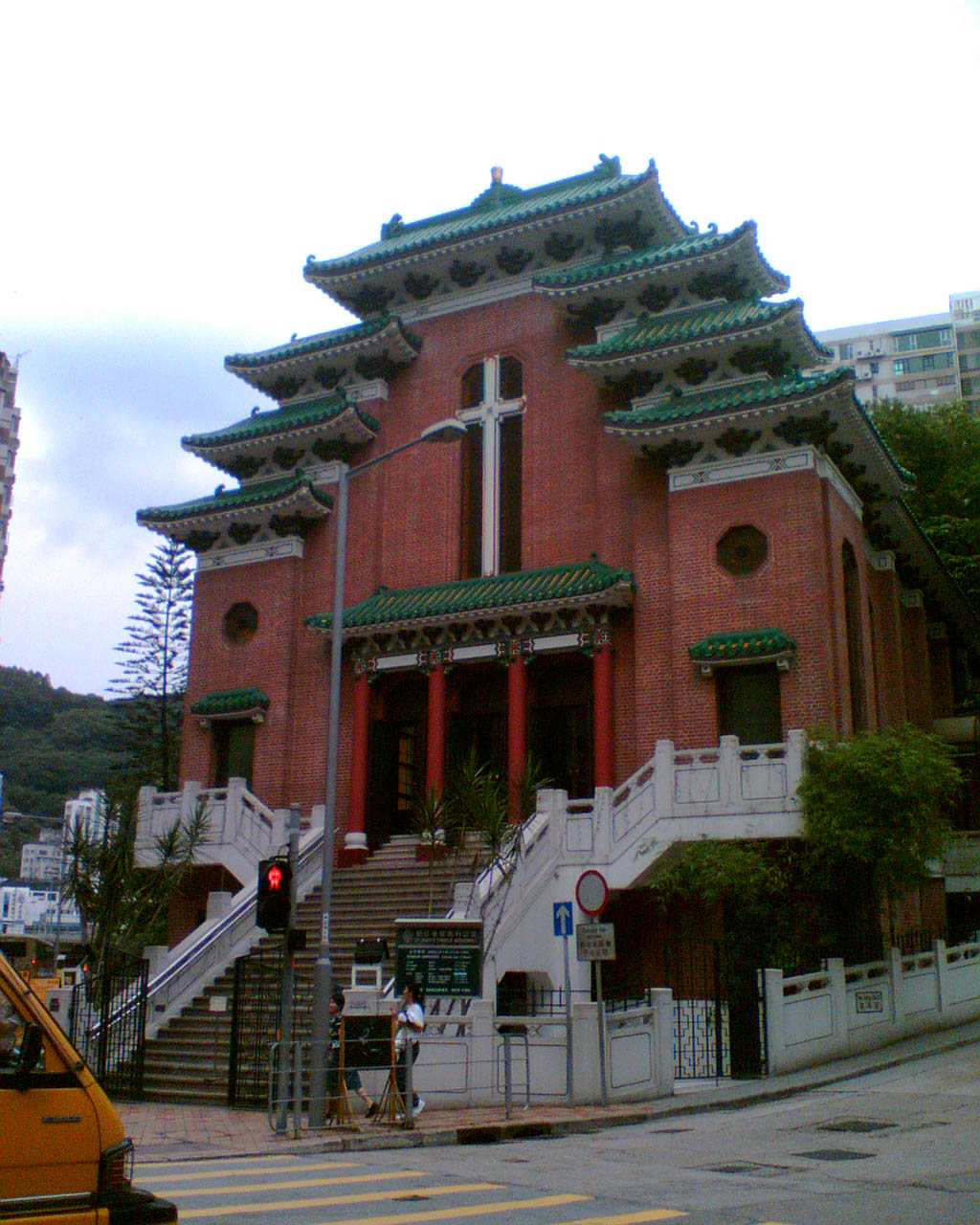
St Mary's Church Causeway Bay

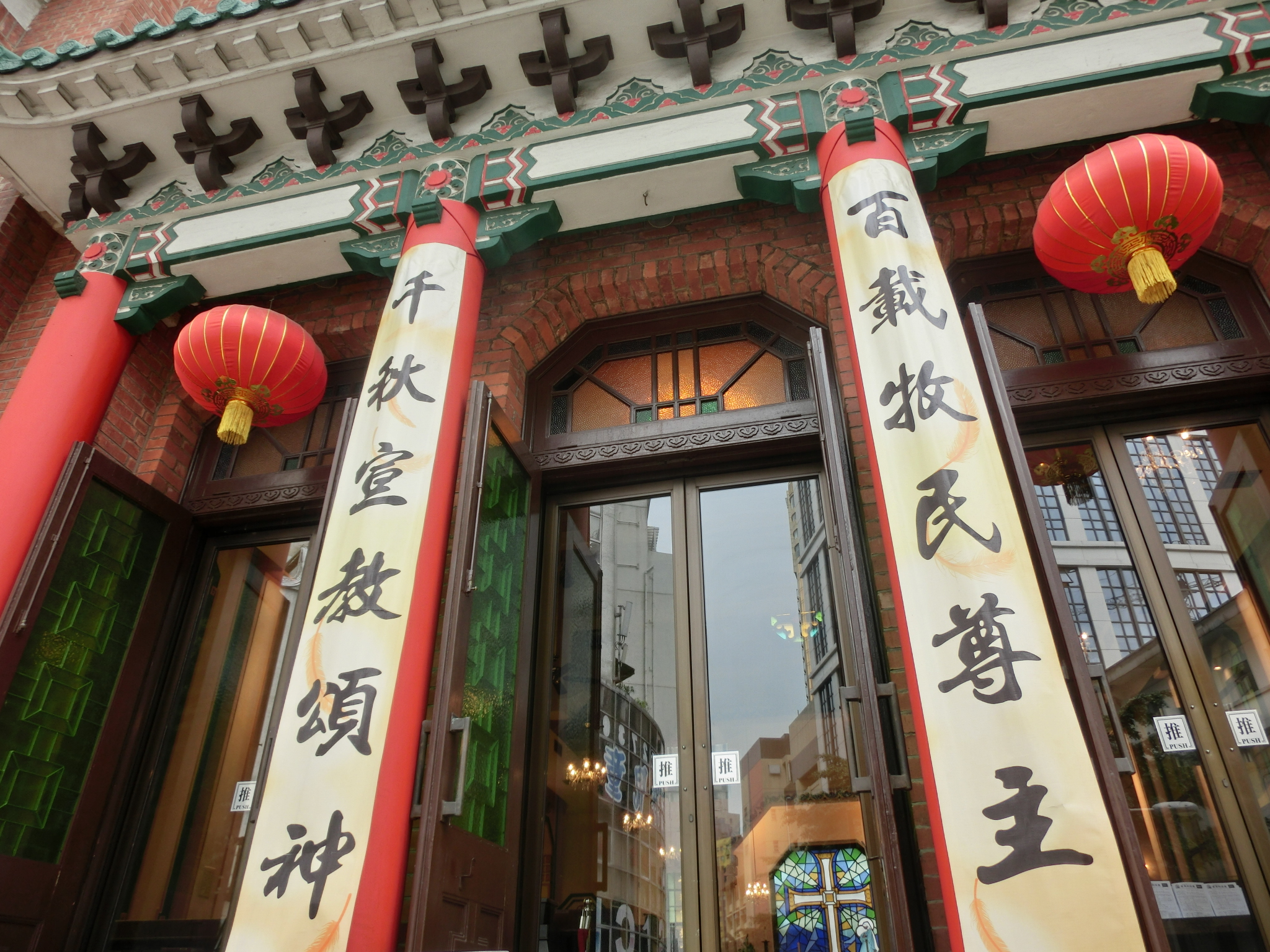
St. Mary's Church
