= Diocese of Hong Kong and Macao =

Former extra-provincial diocese of the Anglican Church (1951–1998)

The Diocese of Hong Kong and Macao (Chinese: 港澳教區) was an extra-provincial diocese in the Anglican Communion serving Hong Kong and Macau. It existed from 1951 until 1998, when it was reorganized as an autonomous Anglican church, the Hong Kong Sheng Kung Hui.

== History ==
The diocese was a remnant of the older Anglican Diocese of Victoria, part of the Chung Hua Sheng Kung Hui, China's autonomous Anglican church. The Chung Hua Sheng Kung Hui was effectively abolished in 1949 during the Chinese Communist Revolution due to the formation of the Three-Self Patriotic Movement. Anglicans in Hong Kong and Macau reorganized the diocese, which was essentially extra-provincial under the Archbishop of Canterbury. The diocese was abolished in 1998 upon the formation of the Hong Kong Sheng Kung Hui as a province of the Anglican Communion in its own right. It was split into four new dioceses: three in Hong Kong and a missionary area covering Macao.

== Bishops ==
- Ronald Hall
  - Andrew Tsu (assistant)
- Gilbert Baker
  - Luke Cheung Wing Ngok (assistant)
- Peter Kwong

=== Cheung Wing Ngok ===
Luke Cheung Wing Ngok (Chinese: 張榮岳; 28 January 1916 – 8 January 1979) was an Anglican bishop who served as assistant bishop in the Diocese of Hong Kong and Macau, 1978–1979. Having served as Archdeacon of Hong Kong and Vicar of St Stephen's Church for three decades, Cheung was consecrated a bishop on 13 June 1978 at St John's Cathedral (Hong Kong), but only served for a few months, before he died of cancer in January 1979.
