= St John's Cathedral (Hong Kong) =

- The Cathedral Church of St John the Evangelist
- 聖約翰座堂
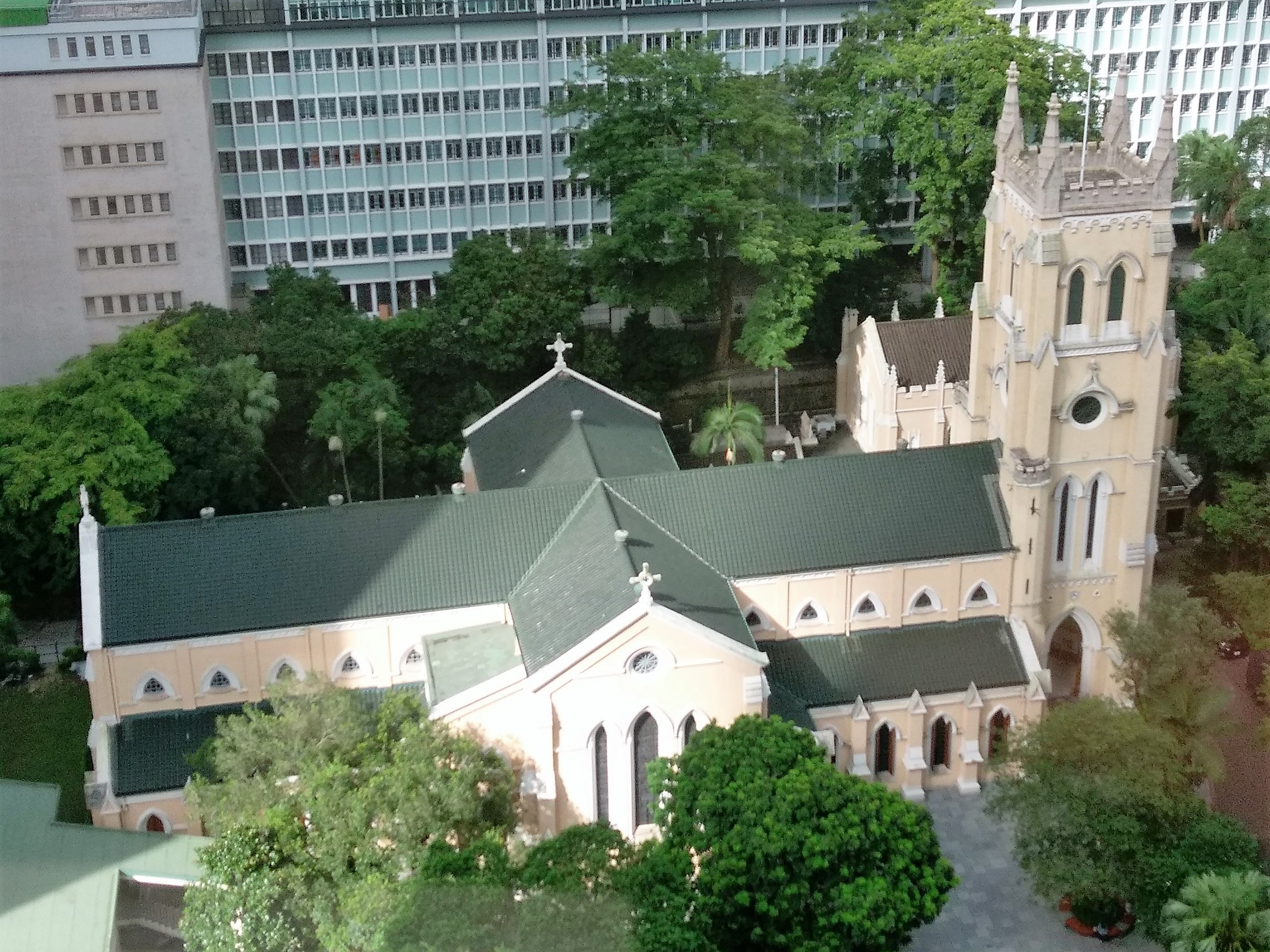
- St John's Cathedral
- St John's Cathedral
- 22°16′43.86″N 114°9′34.41″E
- Location: 4–8 Garden Road; Central, Hong Kong
- Denomination: Anglican
- Churchmanship: High Church
- Website: www.stjohnscathedral.org.hk

History
- Status: Cathedral
- Dedication: St John the Evangelist
- Consecrated: 1852

Architecture
- Heritage designation

Declared Monument of Hong Kong
- Designated: 5 January 1996
- Reference no.: 60
- Style: Gothic Revival
- Groundbreaking: 1847
- Completed: 1849

Specifications
- Materials: stucco, wood

Administration
- Province: Hong Kong & Macao
- Diocese: Hong Kong Island

Clergy
- Archbishop: Andrew Chan
- Bishop: Matthias Der
- Dean: Chan Kwok-keung

St John's Cathedral
- Traditional Chinese: 聖約翰座堂
- Simplified Chinese: 圣约翰座堂
- Cantonese Yale: Sing yeuk hohn joh tòhng
Transcriptions
Standard Mandarin
- Hanyu Pinyin: Shèng yuēhàn zuòtáng
Yue: Cantonese
- Yale Romanization: Sing yeuk hohn joh tòhng
- Jyutping: Sing^{3} yeuk^{3} hon^{6} zo^{6} tong^{4}

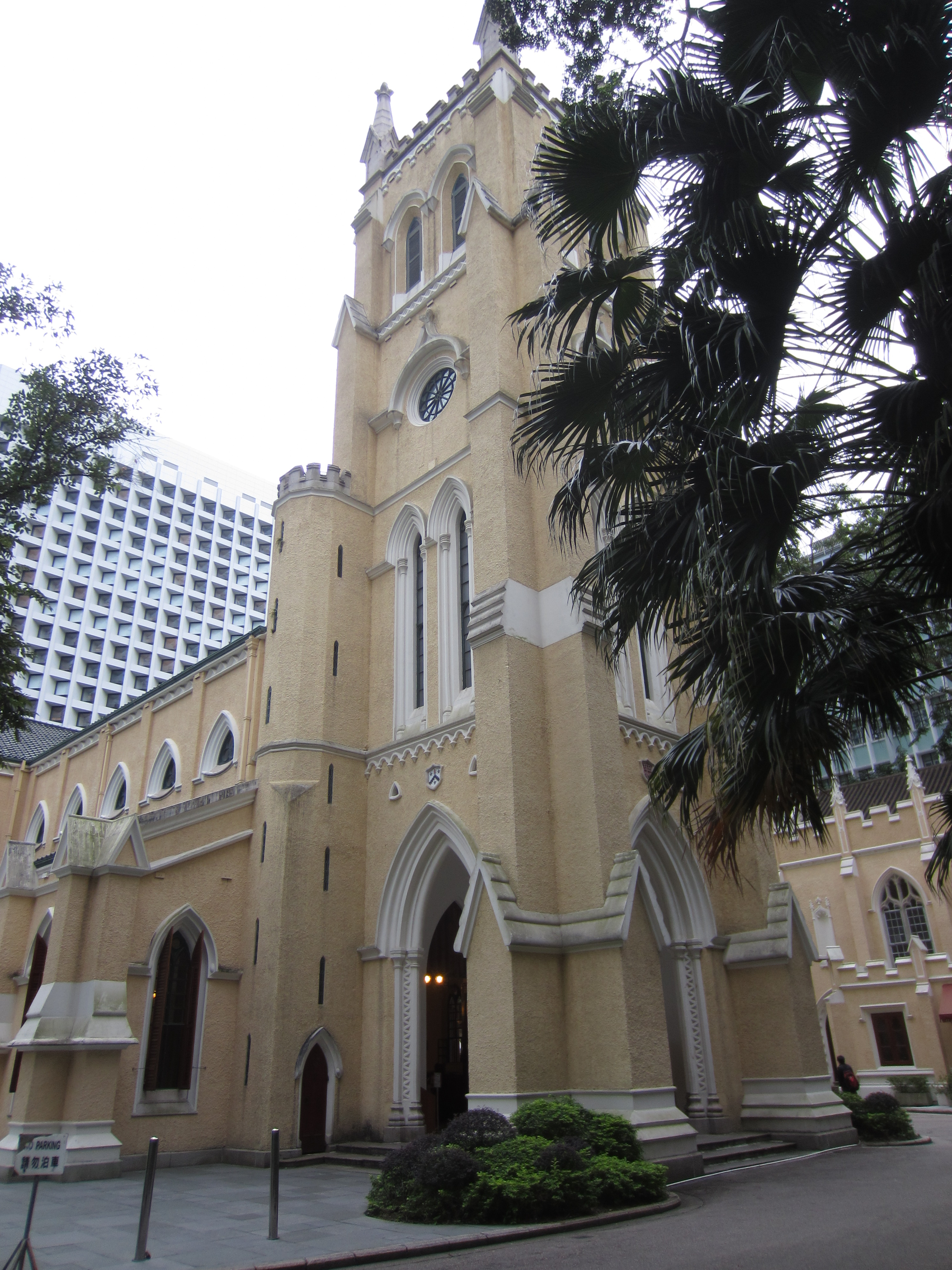
Church tower

The Cathedral Church of Saint John the Evangelist is the cathedral of the Anglican Diocese of Hong Kong Island, and mother church to the Province of Hong Kong and Macao. It is the seat of the Archbishop of Hong Kong and the Bishop of Hong Kong Island.

At Garden Road, Central, the cathedral is located in a central location, surrounded by the Bank of China Tower, Cheung Kong Center, HSBC Main Building, Court of Final Appeal Building, Former Central Government Offices, and the Former French Mission Building.

St John's Cathedral is one of the five cathedrals in Hong Kong. The others are Holy Trinity Cathedral (Anglican), All Saints’ Cathedral (Anglican), St Luke Orthodox Cathedral (Eastern Orthodox), and the Cathedral of the Immaculate Conception (Roman Catholic).

== History ==
The congregation that would become the cathedral held its first Sunday service on Sunday, 11 March 1849, as "Hongkong Colonial Chapel", the founding church of the Diocese of Victoria. It was consecrated as St John's Cathedral by George Smith, bishop of Victoria, in 1852.

On the morning of 8 December 1941, the day after their attack on Pearl Harbor, Hawaii, the Japanese attacked Hong Kong. On Christmas morning 1941 Alaric Rose took the morning service in St John's with a congregation of one hundred, while shelling continued on the island.

During the Japanese occupation of Hong Kong, the cathedral was converted into a club for the Japanese. Many of the original fittings were stripped out, including the original stained glass windows, which had been created by William Morris' firm.

On 9 September 1945, the first service after the arrival of the Royal Navy was held in the cathedral.

It was the site of the Cathay Pacific memorial service for Cathay Pacific Flight 700Z, which crashed in South Vietnam in 1972 due to a bomb.

In 1981, Peter Kwong became the first Chinese bishop of Hong Kong, who went on to become the first archbishop of Hong Kong when the province was established in 1998.

The site of St John's Cathedral is the only freehold land in Hong Kong, granted in fee simple pursuant to s. 6(1) of the Church of England Trust Ordinance (Cap. 1014) of 1930. All other land tenure in Hong Kong is leasehold in nature.

On 5 June 2012, there was a service of thanksgiving at the cathedral in honour of the diamond jubilee of Elizabeth II.

On 1 June 2025, Stephen Chow became the first Cardinal from Roman Catholic Church and Roman Catholic Diocese of Hong Kong to preach in the cathedral. Coincidentally, Bishop Matthias Der celebrated the Sung Eucharist. This marked the first time that there was a Catholic Cardinal and an Anglican Bishop together in the cathedral's 180 years of history.

== Architecture ==
It is the oldest surviving Western ecclesiastical building in Hong Kong, and the oldest Anglican church in the Far East.

The cathedral's architectural style is a plain, unadorned adaptation of 13th-century English and decorated Gothic, which was the popular revivalist style for churches at the time. Along the north wall is a memorial tablet to William Thornton Bate, who was killed in the battle on Canton in 1857. A similar tablet is found at St Ann's Church in Portsea, Portsmouth, Hampshire.

The bell tower of the cathedral is decorated with a large "VR" on the west face, in commemoration of the institution's founding during the reign of Queen Victoria. The north and south faces of the tower are decorated with the coats-of-arms of two former governors of Hong Kong, John Francis Davis and George Bonham.

There were reports that the main doors of the cathedral are made with wood planks salvaged from HMS Tamar, but according to a 2016 article published by the South China Morning Post, that is untrue.

The first pew on the south side of the interior bears the royal arms, as it was formerly reserved for the governor or any member of the royal family visiting Hong Kong before the handover in 1997.

It was declared a monument of Hong Kong in 1996.

== War memorial ==
Next to the cathedral is a large memorial cross, unveiled by governor Reginald Edward Stubbs in 1921 in memory of the soldiers killed in the First World War. During the Japanese occupation the cross was reduced to a straight granite column. In 1952 it was replaced by a Celtic cross, with an inscription added to commemorate those who had died in both world wars. The original bronze tablet with the names of the First World War dead is held inside the cathedral, in St Michael's Chapel.

Every year ex-British Army members hold a memorial service at the memorial cross.

Beside the memorial cross is a tombstone covering the remains of Ronald Douglas Maxwell, who was killed in Wan Chai three days before the ceasefire. This is the only grave within the cathedral precinct, and is registered by the Commonwealth War Graves Commission.

== Clergy ==
Clerical position	Name
Archbishop of Hong Kong	Andrew Chan
Archbishop emeritus of Hong Kong and bishop emeritus of Hong Kong Island	Peter Kwong
Archbishop emeritus of Hong Kong and bishop emeritus of Hong Kong Island	Paul Kwong
Bishop of Hong Kong Island	Matthias Der
Dean	Chan Kwok Keung
Chaplains (ministries)	William Newman (Christian Education, and St Stephen's Chapel Stanley)
Chaplains (ministries)	Robert Martin (liturgy and spirituality, and Emmanuel Church Pokfulam)
Chaplains (ministries)	Drew Courtright (outreach ministry, and Discovery Bay Church)
Chaplains (ministries)	Dwight dela Torre (Filipino congregation)
Chaplains (ministries)	Sharon Langbis (Filipino congregation)
Chaplains (ministries)	Peter Koon (Chinese ministry)
Chaplains (ministries)	Francis Yu (Chinese ministry)
Honorary chaplain	Philip L. Wickeri
Honorary chaplain	Polly Wong Heung-fong (deacon)

== Gallery ==
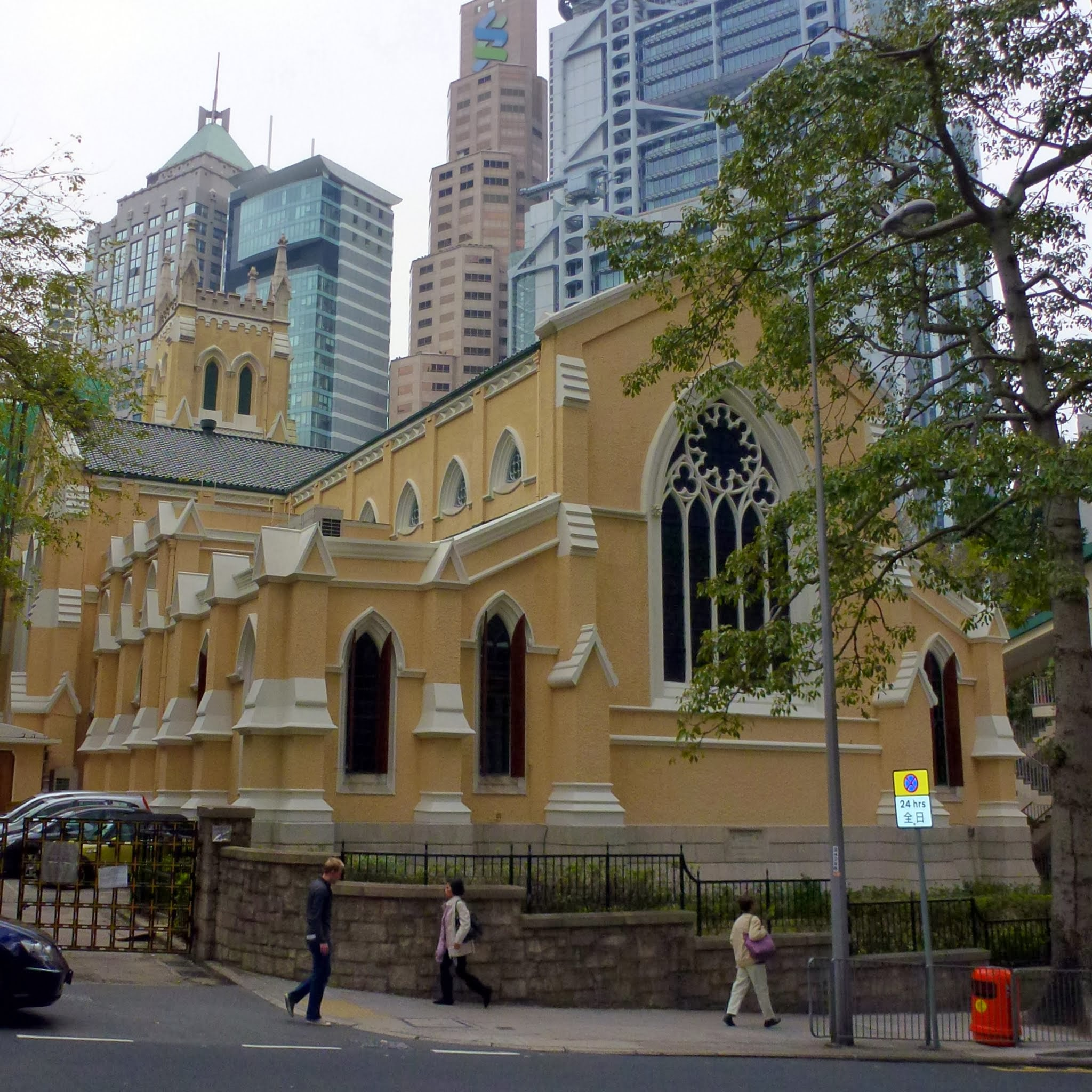
View from Garden Road

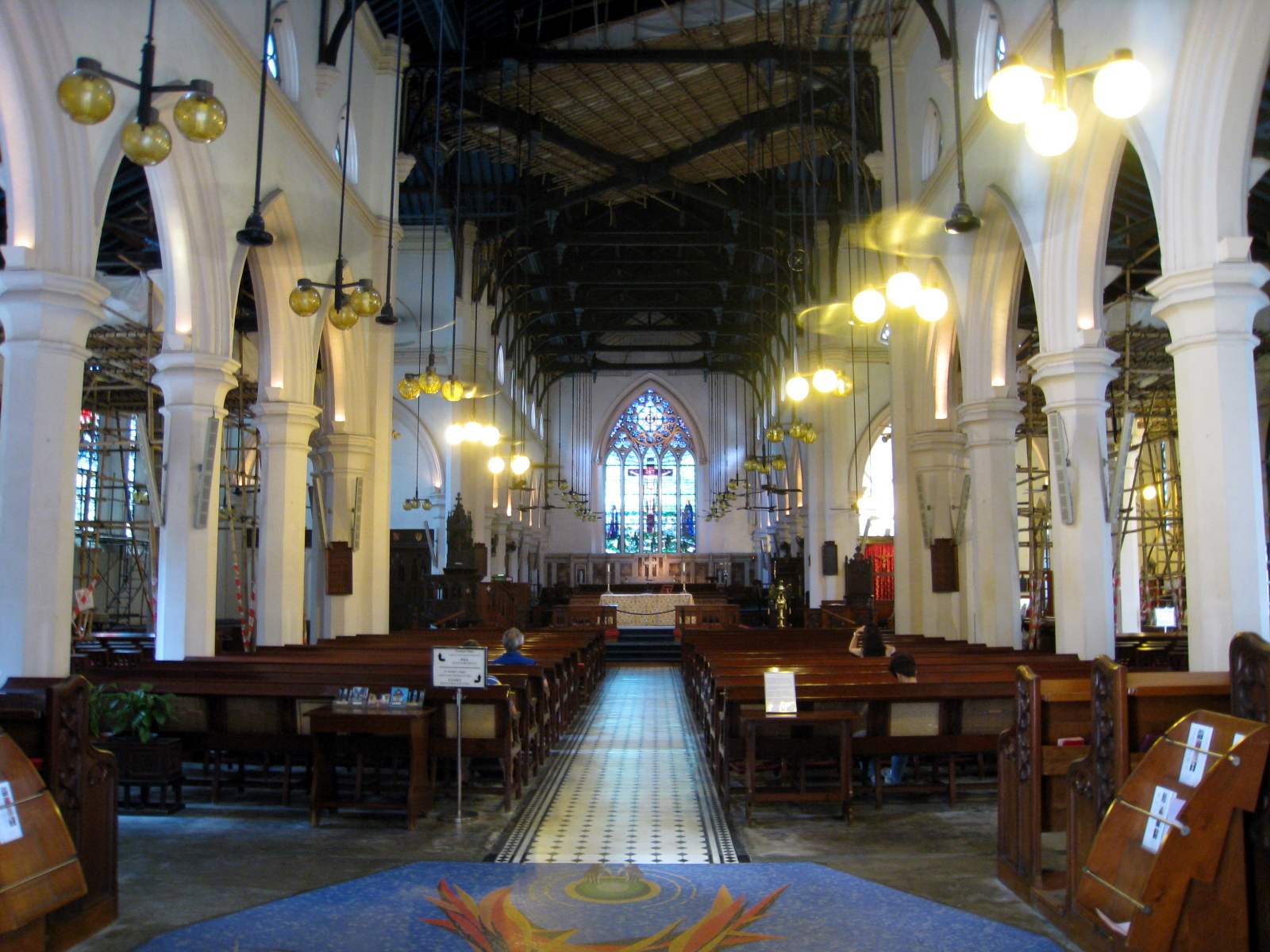
Interior of St John's Cathedral

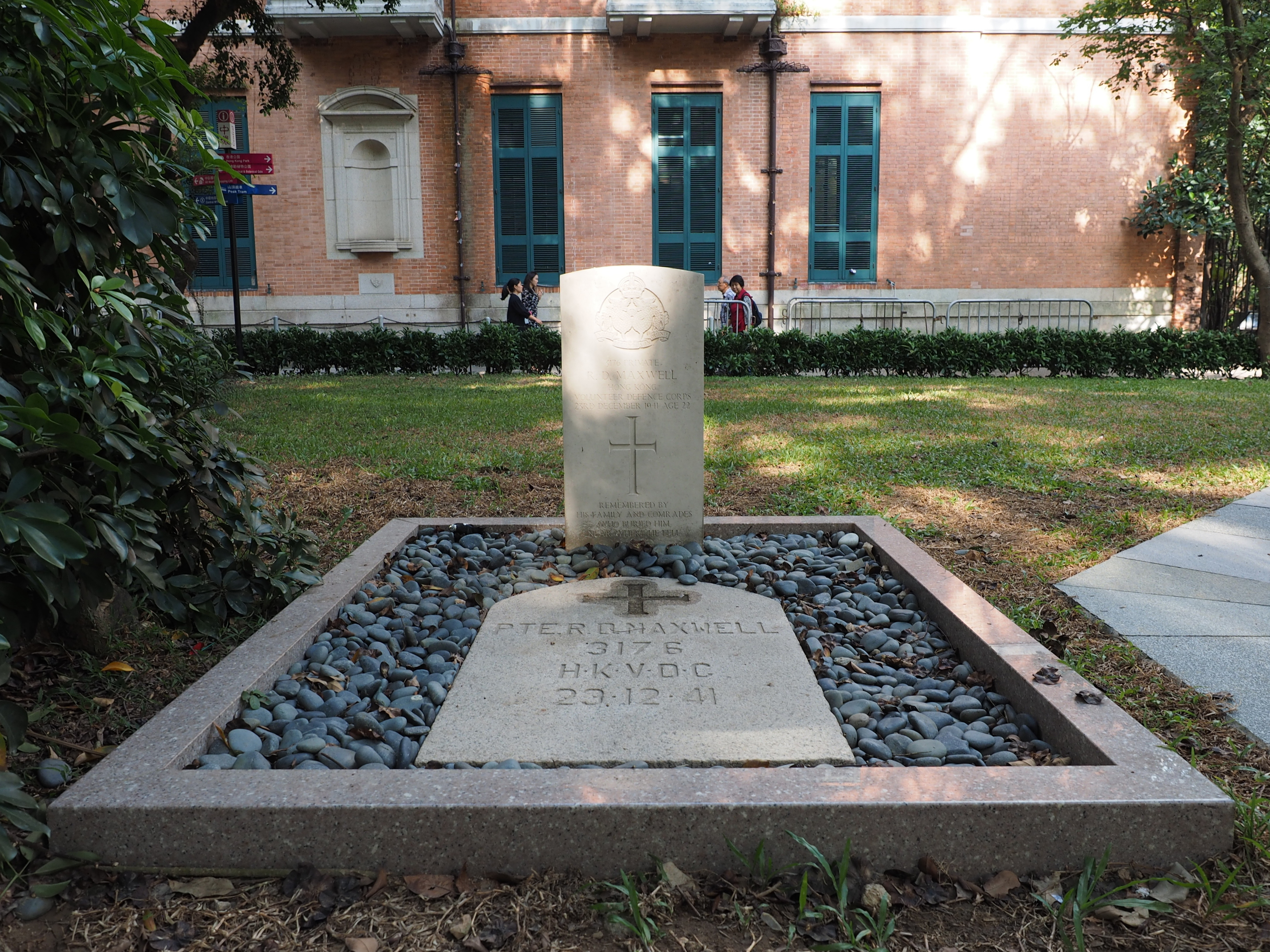
the grave of Ronald Douglas Maxwell

== See also ==
- Hong Kong Sheng Kung Hui
- List of Anglican churches in Hong Kong
- List of cathedrals
- Places of worship in Hong Kong
- St. John's Cathedral, Taipei
