= Peter Kwong (bishop) =

Hong Kong primate (born 1936)

The Right Reverend Peter Kwong GBS
- Archbishop Emeritus of Hong Kong
- Native name: 鄺廣傑
- Church: Hong Kong Sheng Kung Hui
- Diocese: Diocese of Hong Kong Island
- Installed: 1981
- Term ended: January 2007
- Predecessor: N/A (post created)
- Successor: Paul Kwong
- Other posts: Archbishop of Hong Kong; Bishop Emeritus of Hong Kong Island; Bishop of Hong Kong Island; Bishop of Hong Kong and Macao

Personal details
- Born: February 28, 1936 (age 90) British Hong Kong
- Denomination: Anglicanism
- Education: Bexley Hall; Kenyon College; Chung Chi College

Kwong Kong-kit
- Traditional Chinese: 鄺廣傑
Transcriptions
Yue: Cantonese
- Yale Romanization: Kwong Gwóng giht
- Jyutping: Kwong^{3} Gwong^{2} git^{6}

Peter Kwong Kong-kit GBS (Chinese: 鄺廣傑; born 28 February 1936) is a Hong Kong Anglican prelate who was the first Primate of the Hong Kong Sheng Kung Hui (i.e. the Anglican Church), Archbishop of Hong Kong and Bishop of the Diocese of Hong Kong Island following the establishment of the Anglican Communion's Province of Hong Kong after the Handover. He was the first Chinese bishop of the diocese of Hong Kong and Macao.

Kwong was the chaplain of Chung Chi College and lectured at the Chinese University of Hong Kong until he was appointed diocesan secretary in 1979. In 1981 he became the bishop of Hong Kong and Macao; he was consecrated a bishop on 25 March 1981 at St John's Cathedral (Hong Kong); his diocese was split in order to create the new church Province of Hong Kong, and the portion he retained became the Diocese of Hong Kong Island (and he the Bishop of Hong Kong Island). Kwong was installed at the same Cathedral as the first Chinese archbishop of the Anglican Church on 25 October 1998.

His contributions to the community of Hong Kong are wide and varied. He participated in the discussions leading up to the reunification of Hong Kong with the Mainland through the Consultative Committee for the Basic Law, the Preparatory Committee for the SAR and the Selection Committee (an electoral college created by the Preparatory Committee). He was Advisor on Hong Kong Affairs between 1992 and 1997. After the Handover he became a member of the Chinese People's Political Consultative Conference.

Following his retirement in January 2007, he has become the Archbishop Emeritus of Hong Kong Sheng Kung Hui and the Bishop Emeritus of the Diocese of Hong Kong Island.

He is advisor to the Amity Foundation of China, vice-president of the Church Missionary Society and patron of the Comfort Care Concern Group, an organisation for the terminally ill. He has been awarded the degree Doctor of Divinity honoris causa by Kenyon College, Bexley Hall and, in 2000, the University of Hong Kong.

In 2007 Kwong was succeeded by the new archbishop and primate, Paul Kwong (no relation).

== See also ==
- Archbishop of Hong Kong
- Primates in the Anglican Communion
- List of Bishops and Archbishops

Anglican Communion titles
Preceded by Gilbert Baker	Bishop of Anglican Diocese of Hong Kong and Macao; 1980–1998	Diocese abolished
New creation	Bishop of Anglican Diocese of Hong Kong Island; 1998–2006	Succeeded by Paul Kwong
New creation	Archbishop of Hong Kong; 1998–2006	Succeeded by Paul Kwong
New creation	Primate of Hong Kong Sheng Kung Hui; 1998–2006	Succeeded by Paul Kwong
