= Huie Kin =

Chinese Pastor (1854-1934)

Huie Kin (Chinese: 許芹; pinyin: Xǔ Qín; August 8, 1854 – January 22, 1934) was a Chinese-American Presbyterian pastor.

He was born in Sunning (now Taishan) in southern Guangdong, China. He sailed to San Francisco in 1868 where he was houseboy; his later employer, Mrs. James Gardiner, later helped him in his education. He attended Geneva College in Geneva, Pennsylvania, and Lane Theological Seminary in Cincinnati. He became a missionary to the Chinese in New York City, and according to his obituary he founded the First Presbyterian Church for the New York Chinese, though a more recent book describes him instead as the "primary Chinese missionary at the Chinese Sunday School" at the Presbyterian Church on University Place. He published Reminiscences, a memoir, in 1932.

He married Louise M. van Arnam; the couple met in 1886 and were married in April 1889.

He returned to China shortly before his death, and died in Beijing. He was survived by his wife and nine of their ten children.

== Sources ==
- Lui, Mary Ting Yi (March 4, 2007). The Chinatown Trunk Mystery: Murder, Miscegenation, and Other Dangerous Encounters in Turn-of-the-Century New York City. Princeton University Press. ISBN 978-0-691-13048-4.
