= Philip L. Wickeri =

Philip L. Wickeri (Chinese: 魏克利) is Adviser to the Archbishop of Hong Kong for theological and historical studies and Professor of Church History at Hong Kong Sheng Kung Hui Ming Hua Theological College. He is specialized in Chinese theology and Chinese church history.

== Education and Academic Career ==
Wickeri obtained his A.B. at Colgate University and his M.Div. at Princeton Theological Seminary. Between his M.Div. and his Ph.D., he spent some time in Taiwan. He also earned a Ph.D. at Princeton and a D.D. at Church Divinity School of the Pacific.

Since the 1980s, he taught at Nanjing University. During his stay in Nanjing, he helped to establish the Amity Foundation, the Chinese Bible printing company. He stayed in Hong Kong and China until 1998, the year he took up the offer of Professor of World Christianity at San Francisco Theological Seminary and the Graduate Theological Union in Berkeley, California. He was ordained by Bishop K.H. Ting in 1992.

In 2008, he was invited by Paul Kwong, Archbishop of Hong Kong, to be his advisor for theological and historical studies in HKSKH. While he became advisor to the archbishop and professor of church history in HKSKH Ming Hua Theological College, he still held the position as adjunct faculty in interdisciplinary studies at the Graduate Theological Union and adjunct professor in theology at California State University.

== Family life ==
He met his wife, Janice, when both of them studied at the Chinese School of Middlebury College in Vermont. Together they have one daughter, Elisabeth.

== Writings ==
- Wickeri, Philip L. and Lois Cole (Eds., 1995). Christianity & Modernization: A Chinese Debate. Hong Kong: Daga Press. ISBN 9789627250173
- Wickeri, Philip L. (1988). Seeking the Common Ground: Protestant Christianity, the Three-Self Movement, and China's United Front. Maryknoll, N.Y.: Orbis Books. ISBN 9781610975292
- Wickeri, Philip L. (2007). Reconstructing Christianity in China: K. H. Ting and the Chinese Church. Maryknoll, N.Y.: Orbis Books. ISBN 9781608333660
- Wickeri, Philip L. (2015). Christian Encounters with Chinese Culture: Essays on Anglican and Episcopal History in China. Hong Kong: Hong Kong University Press. ISBN 9789888208388
- Wickeri, Philip L. (2016). Unfinished History: Christianity and the Cold War in East Asia. Leipzig : Evangelische Verlagsanstalt. ISBN 9783374040742
- Wickeri, Philip L. and Chan Ruiwen (2019). Thy Kingdom Come: A Photographic History of Anglicanism in Hong Kong, Macau, and Mainland China. Hong Kong: Hong Kong University Press. ISBN 9789888528028
