= HKSKH Ming Hua Theological College =

Coordinates: 22.2797°N 114.1557°E

- Traditional Chinese: 香港聖公會明華神學院
- Simplified Chinese: 香港圣公会明华神学院
Transcriptions
Standard Mandarin
- Hanyu Pinyin: Xiānggǎng Shèng Gōnghuì Míng Huá Shénxuéyuàn
Yue: Cantonese
- Jyutping: hoeng1 gong2 sing3 gong1 wui2 ming4 waa4 san4 hok6 jyun6*2

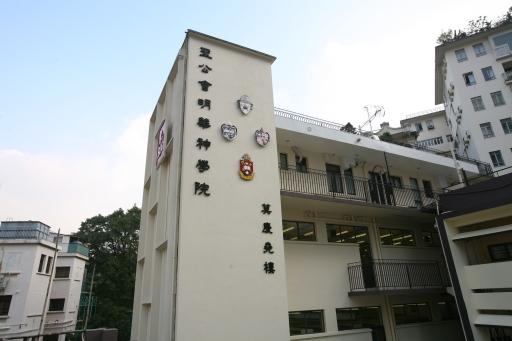
Sheng Kung Hui Ming Hua Theological College (聖公會明華神學院)

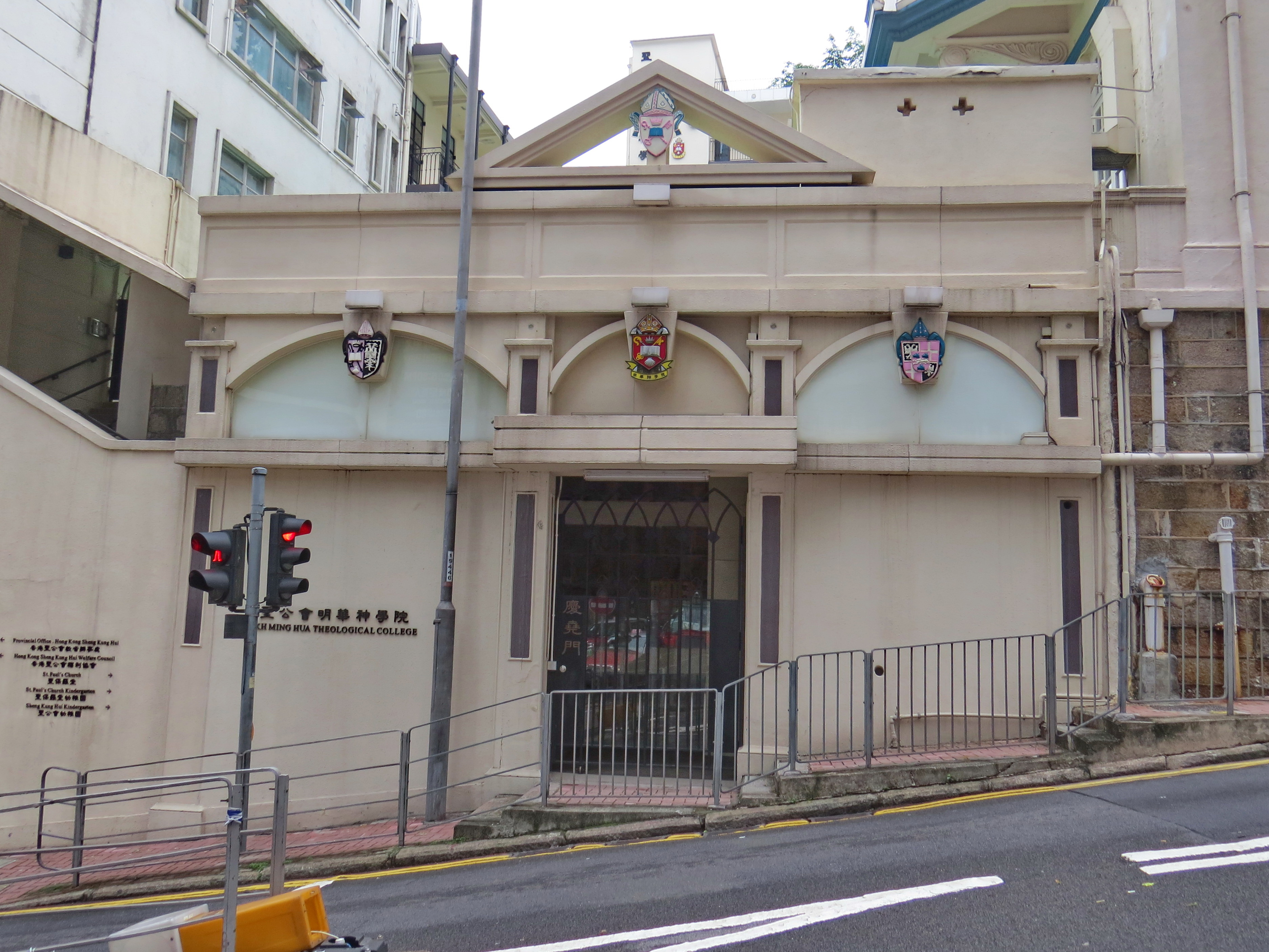
Ming Wah Theological College Qingyao Gate

The HKSKH Ming Hua Theological College (Chinese: 香港聖公會明華神學院), full name "Hong Kong Sheng Kung Hui Ming Hua Theological College", shortly "Ming Hua Theological College" or Ming Hua, is the Protestant seminary of Hong Kong Sheng Kung Hui, the local Anglican Church. Founded in 1947, Ming Hua is now a large seminary offering programs up to doctoral degrees. It is also the only Anglican seminary in Greater China, committed to the training and education of all members of the Church in Hong Kong and Macau.

== History ==
In 1947, the "Ming Hua College" was established by R.O. Hall, the Bishop of then the Church of England’s Diocese of Victoria. There were nine teachers and Hall was the principal. The school provided training courses for Chinese lay Christians in Hong Kong and Macau, particularly the poor and under-privileged among them.

In 1996, the Province of Hong Kong Sheng Kung Hui was established. In order to cooperate with the training of clergymen for the Province, Ming Wah College was renamed "Ming Hua Theological College", with the responsibility to train priests and lay people. And it was the only Sheng Kung Hui (i.e., Anglican) seminary in Greater China.

In 2017, after partnering with the Charles Sturt University in Australia, Ming Hua was approved to offer Bachelors and Masters degrees by the education bureau of the Hong Kong Government.

In 2021, the same Church's St. Mark's Primary School in Shau Kei Wan closed. The site was redeveloped into the new campus of Ming Hua Theological College.

In 2025, Ming Hua partnered with Virginia Theological Seminary to offer its Doctor of Educational Ministry (DEdMin) degree.

Ming Hua Theological College is now a large seminary offering programs up to doctoral level. The current president of the college is Archbishop Emeritus Paul Kwong.

== Programs ==
The programs offered by Ming Hua include

- Doctor of Educational Ministry
- Master of Arts in Christian Studies
- Diploma of Theology
- Diploma of Sacred Music
- Diploma of Spiritual Direction
- Clinical Pastoral Education (CPE)

== Library ==
The library of Ming Hua was officially opened after the newly renovated College's dedication ceremony on September 27, 1997. It was named the "Lai-Wong Yan-lin Library" (after the chief benefactor's name). The library mainly collects books and periodicals in the fields of Christianity, theology, philosophy, church history and humanities. It occupies two floors, including a study area and five collection areas: circulation, audio-visual materials, periodicals, reference books and special collections. The circulation books and most audio-visual materials are available for loan. Readers can use the library’s computer facilities or personal laptops to connect to the library’s Wi-Fi and access a variety of electronic resources. The library regularly holds workshops to help readers build digital literacy and skills so that they can use the library’s facilities and resources more effectively.

== Academic exchanges ==
There are frequent guests of overseas scholars and professors, exchanging with scholars of Ming Hua. The College also has close relationship with local partners and with the Three Self Patriotic Movement of the Protestant Churches in China.

== Publications ==
Since 2013, Ming Wah has published a quarterly magazine @Ming Wah, which mainly records reflections from teachers and students, photos of activities, and news and developments of the college.

== See also ==
- Hong Kong Sheng Kung Hui
- List of evangelical seminaries and theological colleges
