= Murder of Poon Hiu-wing =

2018 murder in Taipei, Taiwan

- The victim, Poon Hiu-wing
- Location: Purple Garden Hotel, Datong District, Taipei, Taiwan
- Date: 17 February 2018
- Attack type: Battery, homicide (strangulation)
- Victim: Amber Poon Hiu-wing
- Perpetrator: Chan Tong-kai
- Motive: Couple dispute
- Convictions: Money laundering

Amber Poon Hiu-wing (5 August 1997 – 17 February 2018), (Note: traditional Chinese: 潘曉穎; simplified Chinese: 潘晓颖; Jyutping: pun1 hiu2 wing6; Cantonese Yale: Pūn Híu-wihng; pinyin: Pān Xiǎoyǐng) a 20-year-old pregnant woman from Hong Kong, was killed in Taipei on 17 February 2018 whilst on vacation with her boyfriend Chan Tong-kai (born 13 December 1998), (Note: traditional Chinese: 陳同佳; simplified Chinese: 陈同佳; Jyutping: can4 tung4 gaai1; Cantonese Yale: Chàhn Tùhng-gāai; pinyin: Chén Tóngjiā) aged 19 at the time and from Shenzhen. Chan admitted to Hong Kong authorities that he killed his girlfriend in a hotel room in Taipei, stole her belongings, left her body in the bushes, and flew back to Hong Kong. As the murder happened in Taiwan – where Hong Kong authorities had no jurisdiction – Chan could only be sentenced on money laundering charges resulting from the murder. Chan could not be extradited to Taiwan either since no extradition treaty exists between Hong Kong and Taiwan.

In February 2019, the Hong Kong government cited this case as the rationale for a proposed amendment to the ordinances regarding extradition to establish a mechanism for case-by-case transfers of fugitives, on the order of the chief executive, to any jurisdiction with which the city lacks a formal extradition treaty. While the proposed amendment would allow Hong Kong to extradite Chan to Taiwan, concerns over the inclusion of mainland China in the amendment led to the 2019–2020 Hong Kong protests. As such, the murder case is often cited by the media for ultimately sparking the months-long unrest.

== Murder in Taiwan ==
According to court documents, the victim Amber Poon Hiu-wing and the accused suspect Chan Tong-kai met in July 2017 while working part-time for the same company. They began an intimate relationship a month later, and by the end of the same year Poon became pregnant. Chan arranged a trip to Taiwan for the two of them in February 2018, paying for the plane tickets and accommodation. Poon told her mother on 8 February that she would be going to Taiwan with a friend until 17 February, but did not divulge the identity of the person accompanying her.

On 16 February 2018, the night before the couple were to fly back to Hong Kong, they went to one of Taipei's night markets and bought a pink suitcase there. After they returned to their room in the Purple Garden Hotel in Datong District, they quarrelled over how to pack their belongings into the suitcase they just bought. The quarrel ended with the two making up and having sex, and Poon messaged her mother at 1:21 am of 17 February through WhatsApp that she would be back in Hong Kong later that night. Around 2 am, the two got into another argument, during which Poon revealed the baby she was carrying in her womb was conceived with a former boyfriend, and showed Chan a video of her having sex with another man. Chan reacted with rage and smashed her head against the wall of the hotel room and started strangling her from behind with his hands. They struggled on the floor for around 10 minutes until Poon was dead. Chan then folded her body into the suitcase, packed her belongings, and went to bed.

On the morning of 17 February, Chan disposed of Poon's belongings in garbage bins around the hotel—though keeping her ATM card, her digital camera, and her iPhone—and dragged the suitcase (with the body inside) into the Taipei Metro. After a 40-minute ride, he got off at Zhuwei station and dumped the body in the thickets off the trail along the Tamsui River. He tossed the suitcase elsewhere and withdrew NT$20,000 from Poon's account using her password with the intention of doing more shopping in Taiwan. However, he changed his mind and boarded the plane back to Hong Kong that night. Over the next two days, Chan took money from Poon's account three more times, totalling HK$19,200, to pay his credit card bills.

== Investigation and trial ==
Poon's parents reported her as missing to Hong Kong police on 5 March. They also discovered a copy of Chan's departure and arrival cards for Taiwan identifying the hotel Chan and Poon stayed in. With this information, Poon's mother filed a missing persons report, while her father flew to Taipei, and sought help from local authorities. The hotel handed over surveillance footage to the Taipei city police, which showed both Poon and Chan entering the hotel on 16 February but only Chan leaving the next morning, dragging the pink suitcase behind him. Taiwan's Criminal Investigation Bureau contacted their counterpart in Hong Kong, who summoned Chan for questioning. Under caution, Chan confessed to killing his girlfriend and revealed where he disposed of the body, upon which the Hong Kong police placed him under arrest on 13 March. On the same day at 9:53 pm, Taiwanese authorities found Poon's decomposing body after a three-hour search. According to the autopsy, Poon's body was exposed to the sun and heavy rain, and her neck bone was missing. Poon's death was ruled a homicide.

Even with Chan's confession, the Hong Kong police could not prosecute him on murder or manslaughter charges since they did not have jurisdiction over crimes committed outside the city under the territorial principle. Instead, Chan was charged with theft and handling stolen goods. The charges were later amended to four counts of money laundering, since the money he withdrew from Poon's account were proceeds of an indictable offence. Chan pled guilty to all four counts, and on 29 April 2019, he was sentenced to 29 months in prison. He was released six months later on 23 October 2019, having served 13 months on remand before sentencing and also having received a one-third sentence reduction for good behaviour in prison.

Separately, authorities in Taiwan sought to lay charges of murder and illegal disposal of a human body against Chan Tong-kai. The Taiwan High Prosecutors Office asked the Hong Kong government for mutual legal assistance three times in the span of six months from mid to late 2018 but received no response. In December 2018, prosecutors in Taipei issued a warrant for Chan, but since Hong Kong and Taiwan had no mutual legal assistance treaty in place, they had to go through political channels to seek assistance from the Hong Kong government to help bring the accused to stand trial in a Taiwanese court.

== Extradition controversy ==
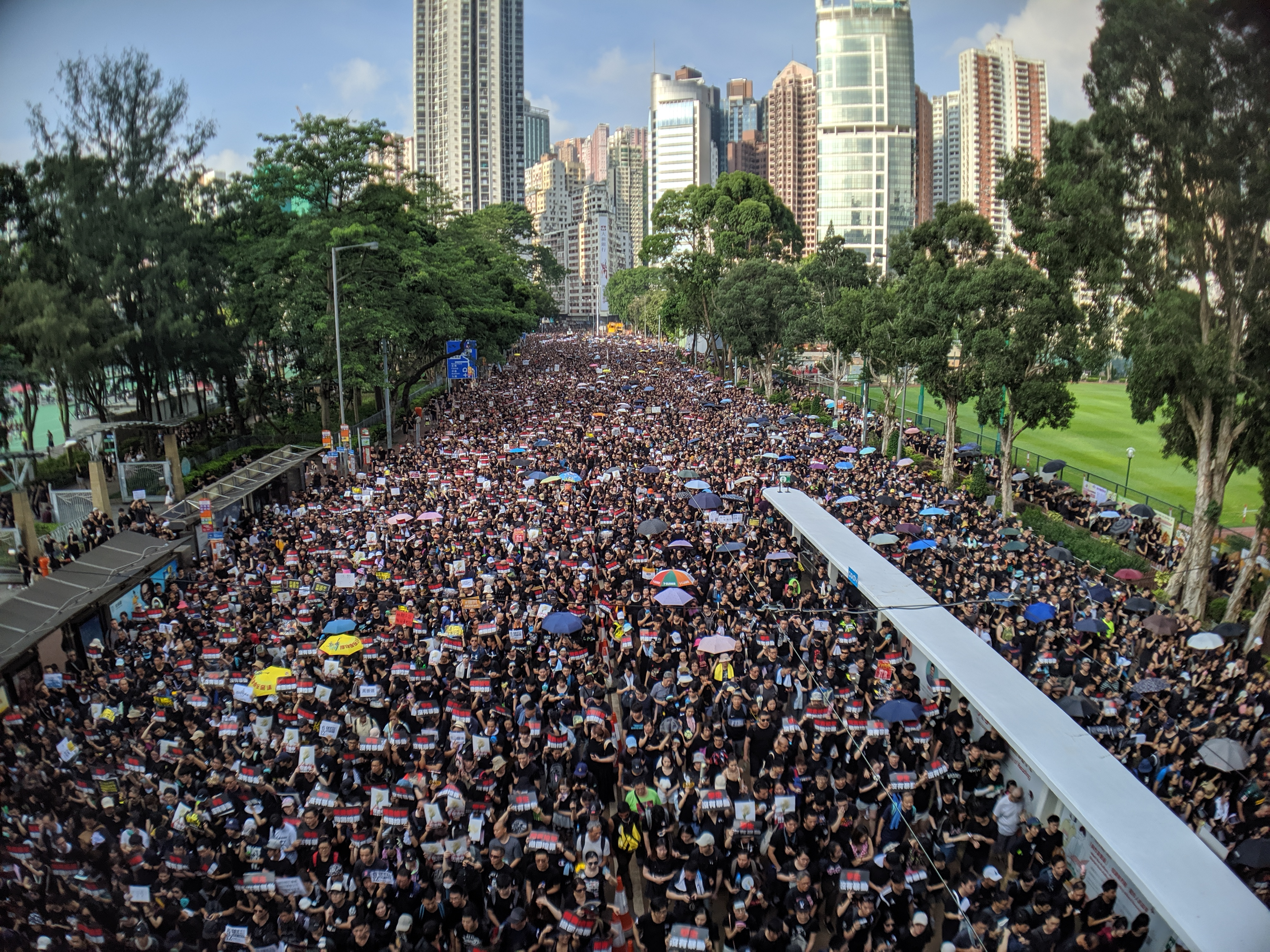
Organisers estimated nearly two million protesters took to the streets calling for the full withdrawal of the extradition bill on 16 June.

Complicating the case was the political situation between Hong Kong and Taiwan, who do not share an extradition treaty. Hong Kong, as a special administrative region of China, could not establish its own treaty with Taiwan since China considers Taiwan a breakaway province and does not recognise the island's government. Hong Kong also did not have any extradition agreements with mainland China as a safeguard between the different legal systems of China and Hong Kong, a former British colony that operates on its own laws derived from English law. This safeguard prevents Hong Kong from handing over accused persons to any part of China, which from China's (and thus Hong Kong's) point of view includes Taiwan.

To close this "legal loophole", the Hong Kong government in February 2019 proposed an amendment to the Fugitive Offenders Ordinance (Cap. 503) and Mutual Legal Assistance in Criminal Matters Ordinance (Cap. 525) to establish a mechanism for case-by-case transfers of fugitives, on the order of the chief executive, to any jurisdiction with which the city lacks a formal extradition treaty. Citing the Chan Tong-kai case in particular, Hong Kong Chief Executive Carrie Lam mentioned receiving five letters from Poon Hiu-wing's parents addressed to her personally seeking justice for their daughter: "If you have read these letters from Mr. and Mrs. Poon, you would also feel that we must try to help them." Lam sought to fast-track the proposal with a 20-day public review, described as "unusually short", and bypass regular legislative processes, explaining that "if we act too carefully, and slowly consult society or issue consultation papers, then I am afraid we would not be able to help with this special case."

The amendment, which would allow Chan Tong-kai to be brought to Taiwan, would also allow extradition to mainland China. This was of concern to different sectors of Hong Kong society. Pro-democracy advocates fear the removal of the separation of the region's jurisdiction from mainland Chinese laws administered by the Communist Party, thereby eroding the "one country, two systems" principle in practice since the 1997 handover. Opponents of the bill urged the Hong Kong government to explore other avenues, such as establishing an extradition arrangement solely with Taiwan, and to sunset the arrangement immediately after the surrender of the suspect.

Taipei reacted to the proposed bill with cynicism, with Chiu Chui-cheng, deputy minister of Taiwan's Mainland Affairs Council, questioning whether Hong Kong government's legislation was "politically motivated" using the homicide case as an "excuse". The Taiwanese government also stated it would not enter into any extradition agreement with Hong Kong that defined Taiwan as part of the People's Republic of China. It opposed the proposed bill on grounds that Taiwanese citizens would be at greater risk of being extradited to mainland China.

Local opposition to the bill grew steadily in Hong Kong. On 9 June, protesters estimated to number from hundreds of thousands to more than a million marched in the streets and called for the bill to be withdrawn and for Chief Executive Carrie Lam to step down. Even with such a showing, the government announced that it would press forward with the second reading of the bill on 12 June. This prompted an escalation in some protesters' methods to stall the bill on 12 June, which resulted in intense standoff between the protesters who gathered outside the Legislative Council Complex and the police, who have deployed tear gas and rubber bullets. Subsequent protests expanded their goals to include demands for investigations on allegations of police brutality and electoral reform, spread to different districts throughout the city, and continued well into 2020.

On 15 June, Lam announced she would suspend the proposed bill. Ongoing protests called for a complete withdrawal of the bill. On 4 September, after 13 weeks of protests, Lam officially promised to withdraw the bill upon the resumption of the legislative session from its summer recess. On 23 October Secretary for Security John Lee announced the government's formal withdrawal of the bill, coincidentally on the same day as Chan Tong-kai's release from prison.

== Proposed surrender to Taiwanese authorities ==
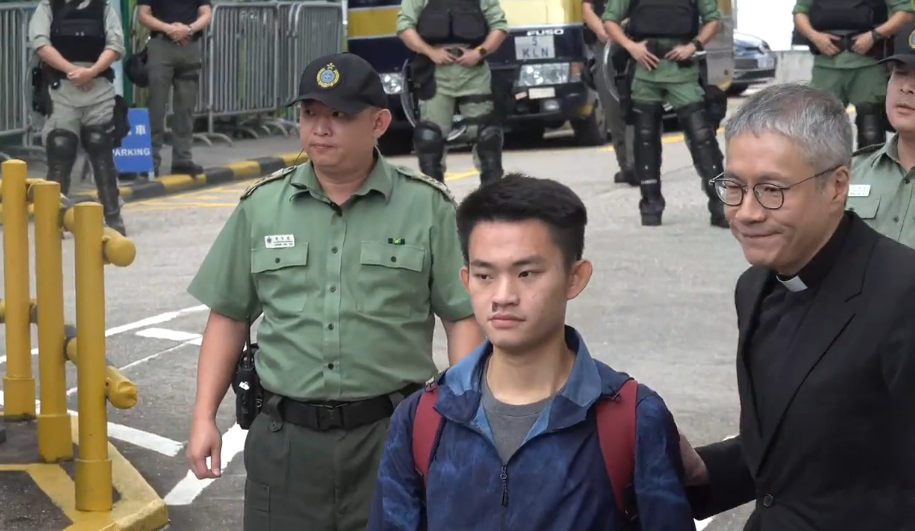
Chan Tong-kai (centre) being released from the Pik Uk Correctional Institution on 23 October 2019, accompanied by Reverend Peter Douglas Koon (right)

The decision to withdraw the extradition bill leaves Hong Kong authorities few options to send Chan to Taiwan to stand trial. On 18 October, days before Chan was to be released, the Hong Kong government released a statement reiterating that they have no jurisdiction over Chan's alleged crimes in Taiwan, and they have no grounds to extend his sentence, implying that Chan could walk free after his release. On the other hand, the statement said Chan expressed willingness to surrender himself to Taiwanese authorities, and has asked the Hong Kong government to help make proper arrangements.

Taiwan initially refused this arrangement, citing the need to have a judicial assistance agreement with Hong Kong so it can obtain key documents relating to the case. In addition, the Taiwanese government under the ruling Democratic Progressive Party (DPP) expressed scepticism at Chan's willingness to surrender, suspecting it to be a Chinese ploy to dilute Taiwan's claim to self-rule by denying it a formal channel to negotiate with Hong Kong. It is suspected that Taiwanese president Tsai Ing-wen, who had long supported the protesters in Hong Kong against the extradition bill, was sensitive to issues relating to sovereignty as the 2020 Taiwan presidential elections drew close. The DPP's response drew fire from the opposition Kuomintang, who accused the Tsai administration for politicising a judicial issue. Hong Kong's authorities dismissed Taiwan's scepticism as "nonsense".

One day before Chan's release, Taiwan reversed its position and offered to take him back, but insisted that he be escorted by Taiwanese officials sent to Hong Kong. This solution would imply more judicial autonomy for Taipei, but Hong Kong rejected the offer, emphasising Taiwanese officials have no law enforcement power in Hong Kong.

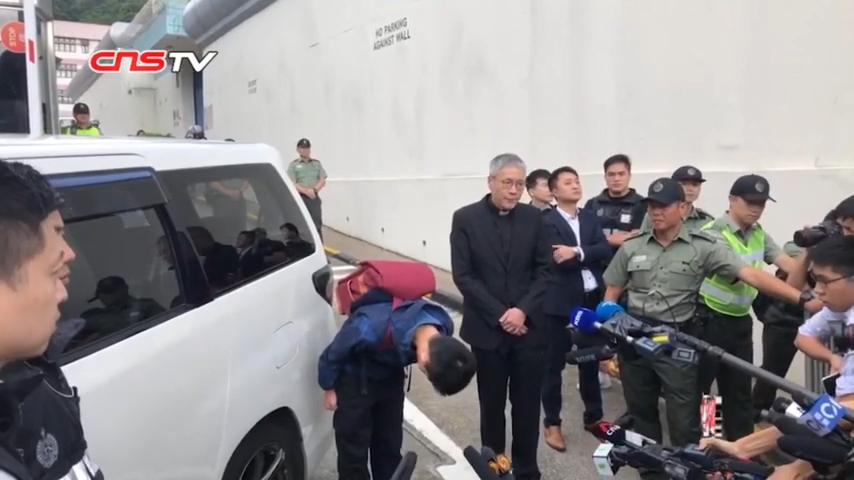
Chan bowing in apology to Poon's family

On the day of his release on 23 October, Chan apologised to Poon Hiu-wing's family and the Hong Kong society in general, obliquely referring to the unrest that he ultimately caused in the city, and asked for forgiveness. Reverend Canon Peter Douglas Koon had purchased tickets to accompany Chan to fly to Taiwan on the day of his release, but they were unable to board the flight due to the timing of his release. As the case became a sensitive political issue, Reverend Koon expressed that Chan would delay his surrender to Taiwan until the presidential elections were over. In the meantime, Taiwan's criminal police department have set up an ad hoc group to handle Chan's case in general, and created a special "single window" mechanism to process Chan's visa application, his expected arrival, and other related arrangements. With Taiwan closing its borders to non-residents due to the COVID-19 pandemic, Chan remains in Hong Kong. He was put under police protection that he requested, reportedly until July 2021 as he no longer stays in the police's safe house.

In October 2021, Poon's mother criticized the Democratic Alliance for the Betterment and Progress of Hong Kong (DAB) lawmakers Starry Lee and Holden Chow for "vanishing" on her after holding a press conference in 2019 with her to push forward the 2019 Hong Kong extradition bill. Lee, Chow, Chris Tang, and Raymond Siu all declined to meet with Poon's mother when she invited them to join her for a press conference. In 2022, Peter Koon, now a member of the Election Committee, stated that Chan could not fly to Taiwan as he had been blacklisted by the airlines, and that the Hong Kong government might have to consider extraterritorial jurisdiction to deal with his case now that the extradition bill had been withdrawn.
