= Customs declaration =

Form for imports and exports across borders

A customs declaration is a form that lists the details of goods that are being imported or exported when a citizen or visitor enters a customs territory (country's borders). Most countries require travellers to complete a customs declaration form when bringing notified goods (alcoholic drinks, tobacco products, animals, fresh food, plant material, seeds, soils, meats, and animal products) across international borders. Posting items via international mail also requires the sending party to complete a customs declaration form.

The declaration form helps the customs to control goods entering the country, which can affect the country's economy, security or environment. A levy duty may be applied.

Travellers have to declare everything they acquired abroad and possibly pay customs duty tax on goods. Some countries offer a duty-free allowance of certain products which may not need to be declared explicitly.

== Types of forms ==
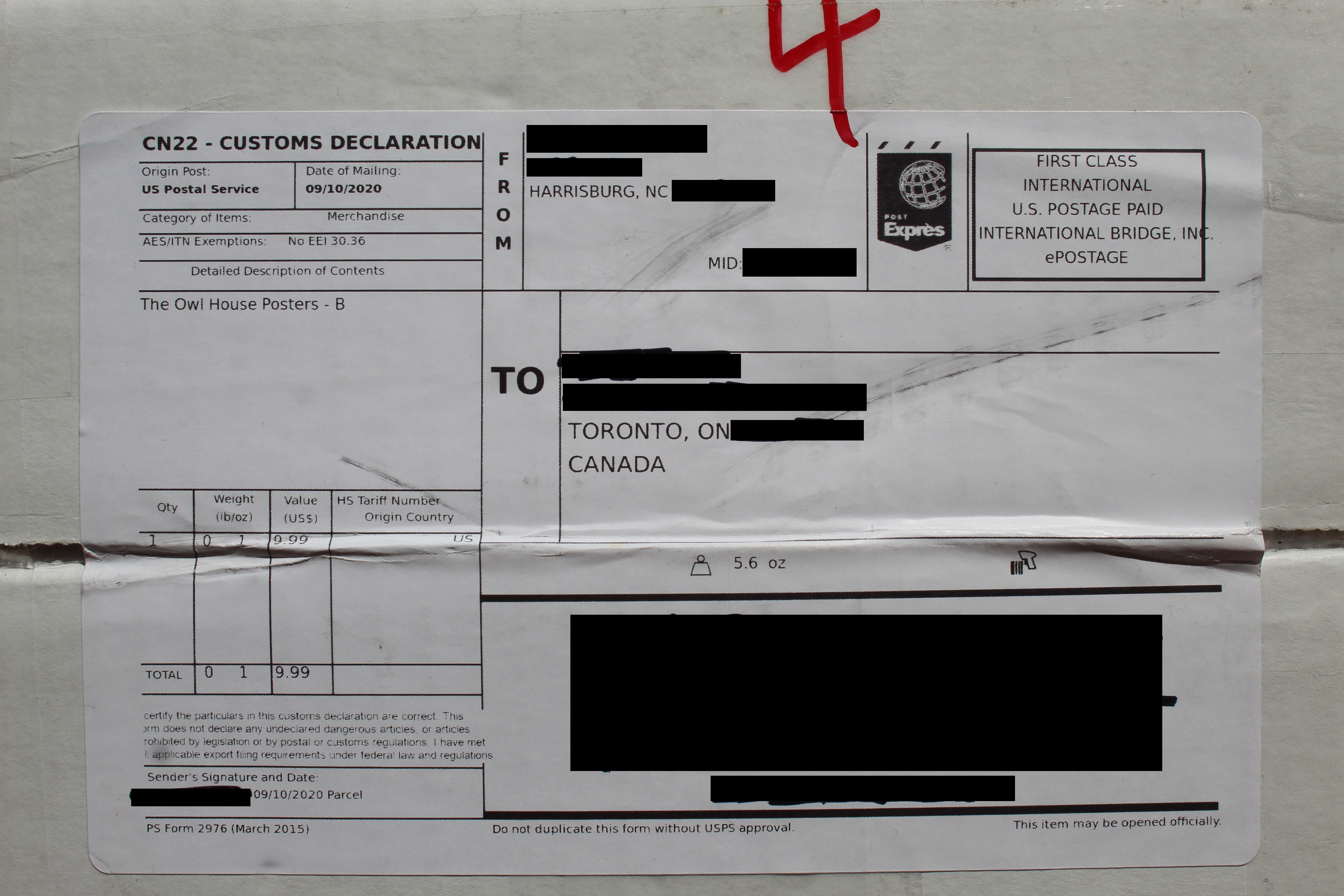
Customs declaration used for parcels.

- When an individual is transporting the goods, the form is called a customs arrival card, or a landing card, or an entry voucher. The traveller is required to fill out the form, sign and submit to the customs or border protection officer before entering the country.
- When an individual or an organization ships goods across the borders, one must use other customs declaration forms, such as a commercial invoice, or a proforma invoice, an import declaration form, an ATA Carnet, or a re-export declaration. Incoterms on these forms define the shipment and customs declaration. A Harmonized System Code (Hs code or harmonized code) might be required to define the type of goods and their associated tax rate. The importer is usually required to provide information about the goods' country of origin and the certificate of origin. Errors on the forms can cause delays or confiscation of the goods. For that reason, importers often use a customs brokerage to clear goods through customs.

Some nations require a customs declaration form from each person crossing the border, while other nations require one form per family traveling together. A family is usually defined as family members residing in the same household, who are related by marriage, adoption, blood, or domestic relationship.

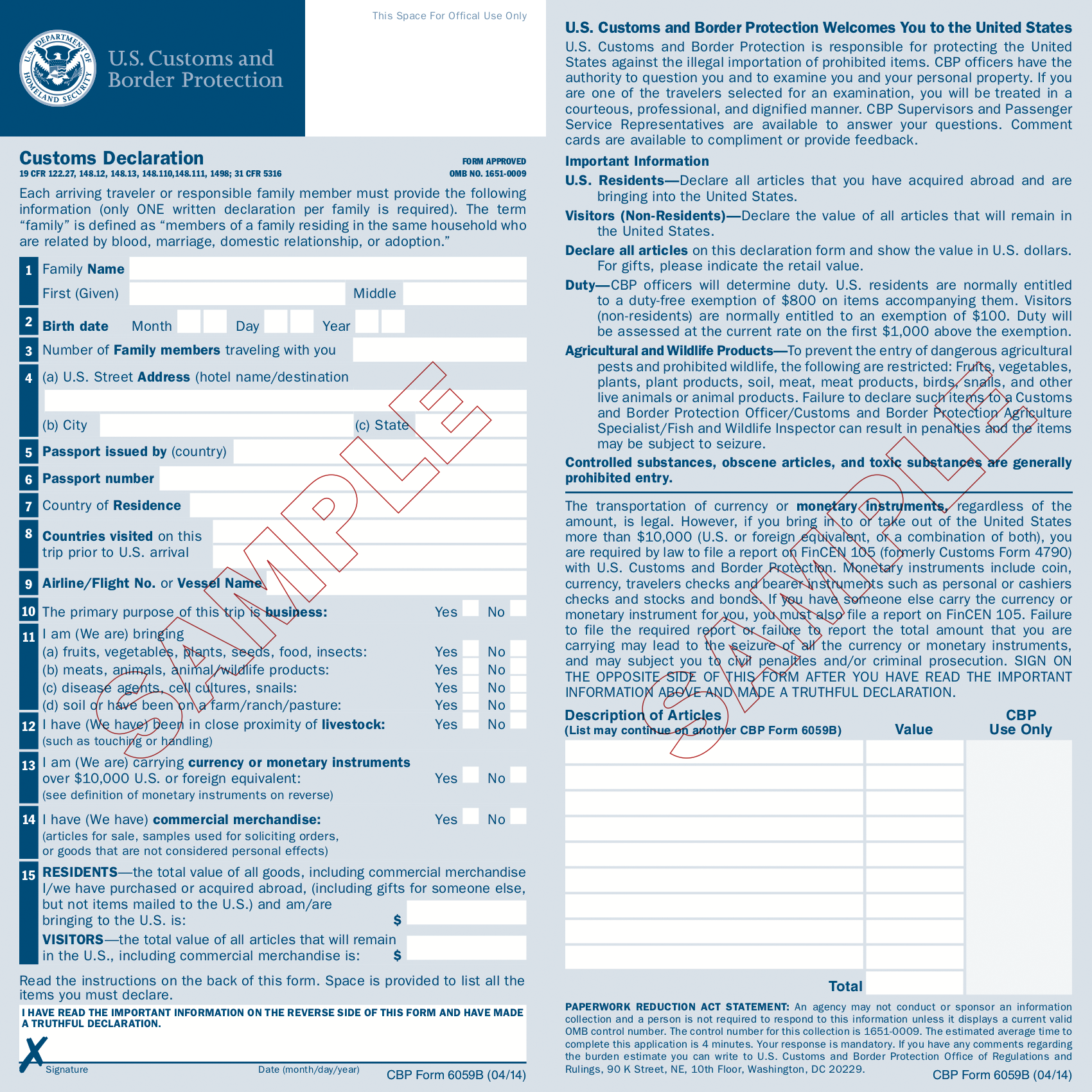
U.S. Customs and Border Protection Form 6059B (arrival card)

== Selected jurisdictions ==
=== Australia ===
The Department of Immigration and Border Protection handles the customs imports and exports of Australia. Incoming passengers are required to declare for inspection all food, plant material and animal products on arrival in Australia.

=== Canada ===
Customs declaration managed by the Canada Border Services Agency:

- Each Canadian resident returning to Canada can have a personal exception on goods and gifts purchased or received in another country. Personal exceptions are based on the length of the absence from the country. 24 hours, 48 hours, or 7 days.
- Alcohol limitations: 1.5 L of wine or 1.14 L of liquor or 24 x 355 mL cans or bottles (8.5 L) of beer or ale. (Must be of legal age in the province of importation.) Tobacco limitations, 200 cigarettes, 200 tobacco sticks, 50 cigars or cigarillos and 200 grams of manufactured tobacco (Special Duty may apply).
- Each individual must declare travelling with $10,000 or more in cash.

=== China ===
General Administration of Customs handles the customs imports and exports for the Government of China.

=== European Union ===
The European Union's Directorate-General for Taxation and Customs Union is responsible for taxation and Customs Union matters. The European Union Customs Union regulates trade in the EU. The European Customs Information Portal is an importing and exporting service provided by the EU. Some territories within the EU do not participate in the customs union, usually as a result of their geographic circumstances. Through agreements, the EU has customs unions with Andorra, San Marino, and Turkey respectively, with the exceptions of certain goods.

=== Hong Kong ===
The Customs and Excise Department handles the customs imports and exports for Hong Kong.

=== India ===
The Central Board of Indirect Taxes and Customs handles the customs imports and exports of India.

Items prohibited for import:

- Maps and literature where Indian external boundaries have been shown incorrectly
- Narcotic drugs and psychotropic substances
- Goods violating any of the legally enforceable intellectual property rights
- Wildlife products
- Counterfeit currency notes/coin or fake currency notes
- Specified Live Birds and animals

=== Indonesia ===
The Directorate General of Customs and Excise handles the customs imports and exports of Indonesia.

=== Kuwait ===
The Kuwait Customs

- Alcohol of all kinds is forbidden to enter.
- Materials containing packaging. In quantities. Will be considered commercial and require a temporary import license
- Fees for commercial materials 5%
- Customs Broker https://www.eqab.net

=== New Zealand ===
The New Zealand Customs Service handles the customs imports and exports of New Zealand.

=== Pakistan ===
Pakistan Customs handles the customs imports and exports for Pakistan and control of the list of tariffs in Pakistan.

=== Philippines ===
The Bureau of Customs handles the customs imports and exports for Philippines.

=== Poland ===
The Customs Service of Poland handles the customs imports and exports for Poland.

=== Russia ===
The Federal Customs Service of Russia handles the customs imports and exports for the Russia. The Russian Customs Tariff covers the Federal Customs Service of Russia.

=== Singapore ===
Singapore Customs handles the customs imports and exports for Singapore.

=== South Korea ===
Korea Customs Service handles the customs imports and exports for South Korea.

=== Sri Lanka ===
Sri Lanka Customs handles the customs imports and exports for Sri Lanka.

=== Sweden ===
The Swedish Customs Service handles the customs imports and exports for Sweden.

=== United Kingdom ===
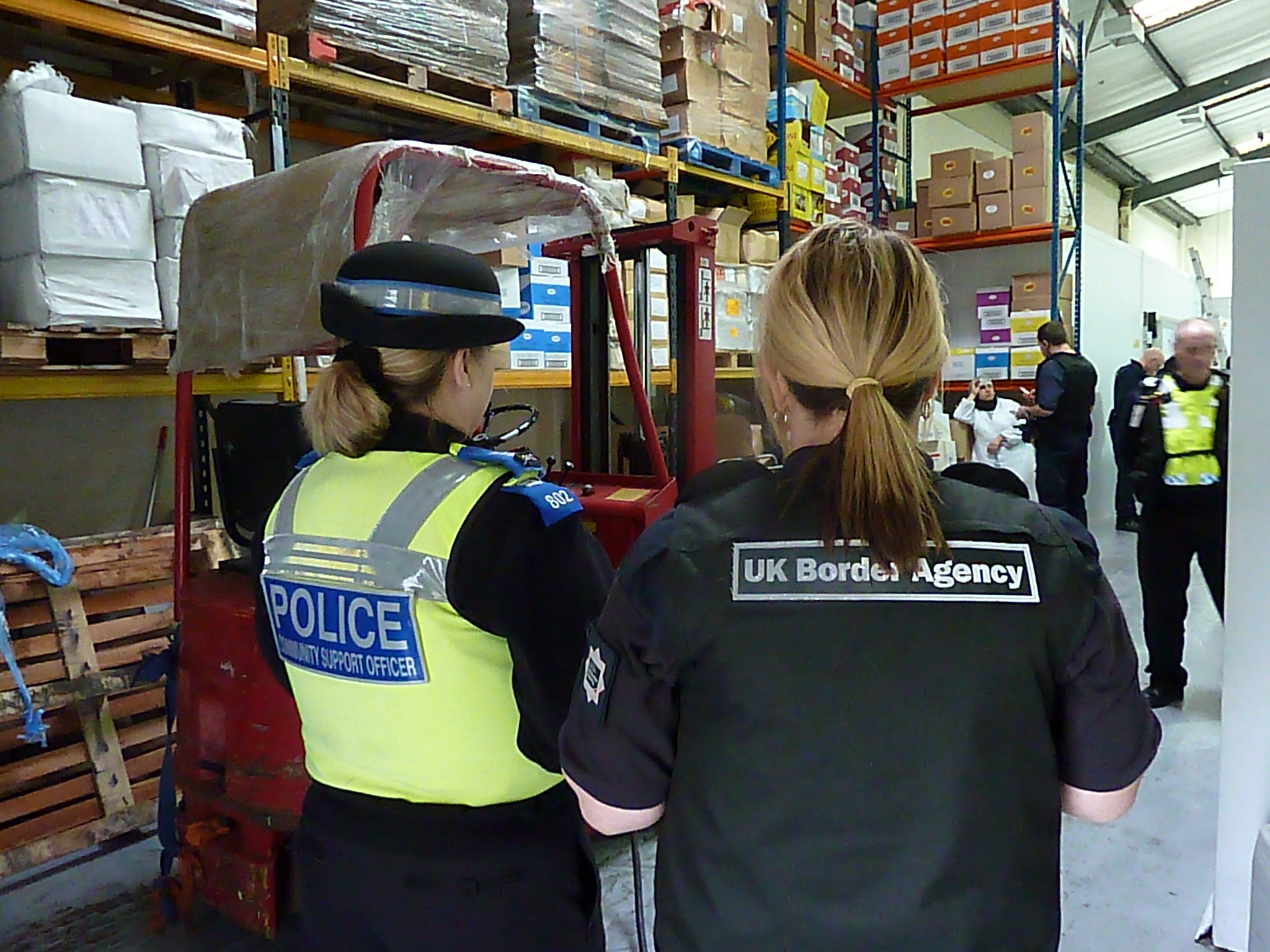
The UKBA regularly cooperates with the Police, such as at this customs raid. The officer on the left is a Police Community Support Officer (PCSO)

Border Force is a British law enforcement command within the Home Office, responsible for frontline border control operations at air, sea and rail ports in the United Kingdom. Previously part of the UK Border Agency which was replaced in 2013 by UK Visas and Immigration which now manages applications for people who want to visit, work, study or settle in the UK.

Border Force works with HM Revenue and Customs. HMRC's Customs Declaration Service (CDS) is replacing the long-standing CHIEF system of customs declaration.

Post Brexit, the Northern Ireland Protocol came into effect on 1 January 2021, which was subsequently revised under The Windsor Framework, a legal agreement between the European Union and the United Kingdom which adjusts the operation of the Northern Ireland Protocol.

The Customs Declaration Service is also used for declarations on goods movements to or from Northern Ireland, including goods moving from Great Britain to Northern Ireland, but other customs declarations will continue to use CHIEF pending a longer-term move to the CDS. HMRC explains that "CHIEF is a reliable and robust platform" but "its age means it can’t easily keep pace with new technology".

=== United States ===
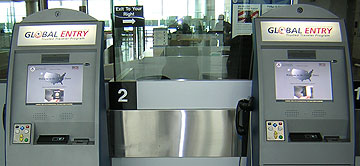
U.S. Global Entry Kiosks, that can make a Customs declaration for the traveller.

- U.S. Customs asks a Head of Household to complete the form (CBP Form 6059B as of July 2016). Family members residing in the same household, who are related by marriage, adoption, blood, or domestic relationship, can use one form.
- For returning U.S. residents: The personal duty exemption for each family member is $800.00. For example, a family of five members returning is allowed a combined personal duty exemption of $4,000 (calculated as $800 for each family member multiplied by 5).
- For international visitors: US laws allow visitors some exemptions, like tobacco, gifts, personal effects, etc. The head of a household can complete a form for a family. It is good to check the current duties and exemptions to avoid tax or loss of goods.
- Anyone travelling with more than $10,000 must declare it.

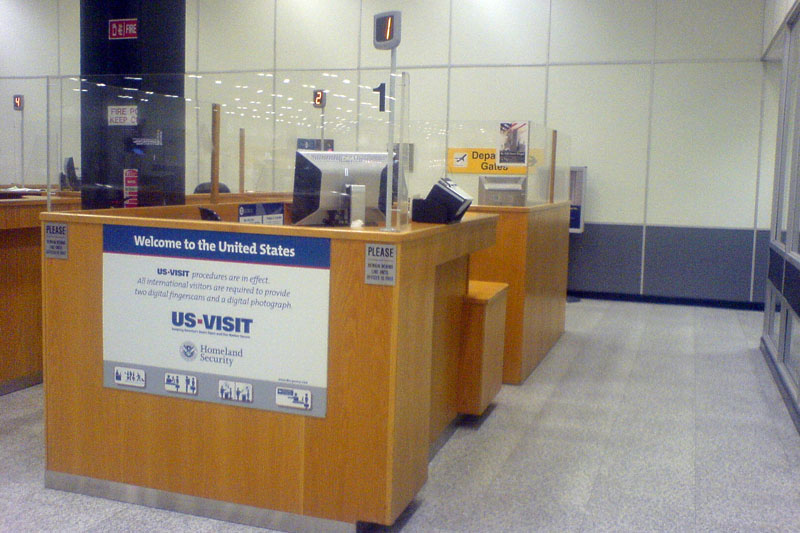
Shannon Airport preclearance

- At some international airports, the US operates United States border preclearance stations, where U.S. Customs and Border Protection is done before boarding the international flight.
- If exporting goods that are valued more than $2,500, an extra form is required: the Electronic Export Information (EEI) form. The Automated Export System (AES) is the system used by U.S. exporters to electronically declare their international exports. This information is used by the Census Bureau to help compile U.S. export and trade statistics.

== See also ==
- Airport check-in
- Carnet de Passages en Douane
- Customs valuation
- Departure card
- Duty-free shop
- Electronic System for Travel Authorization
- Free trade zone
- Freight forwarder
- Landing card
- List of countries by imports
- Migration card
- NAFTA
- Passport
- Title 19 of the United States Code
- Visa (document)

== Gallery ==
International Customs sign

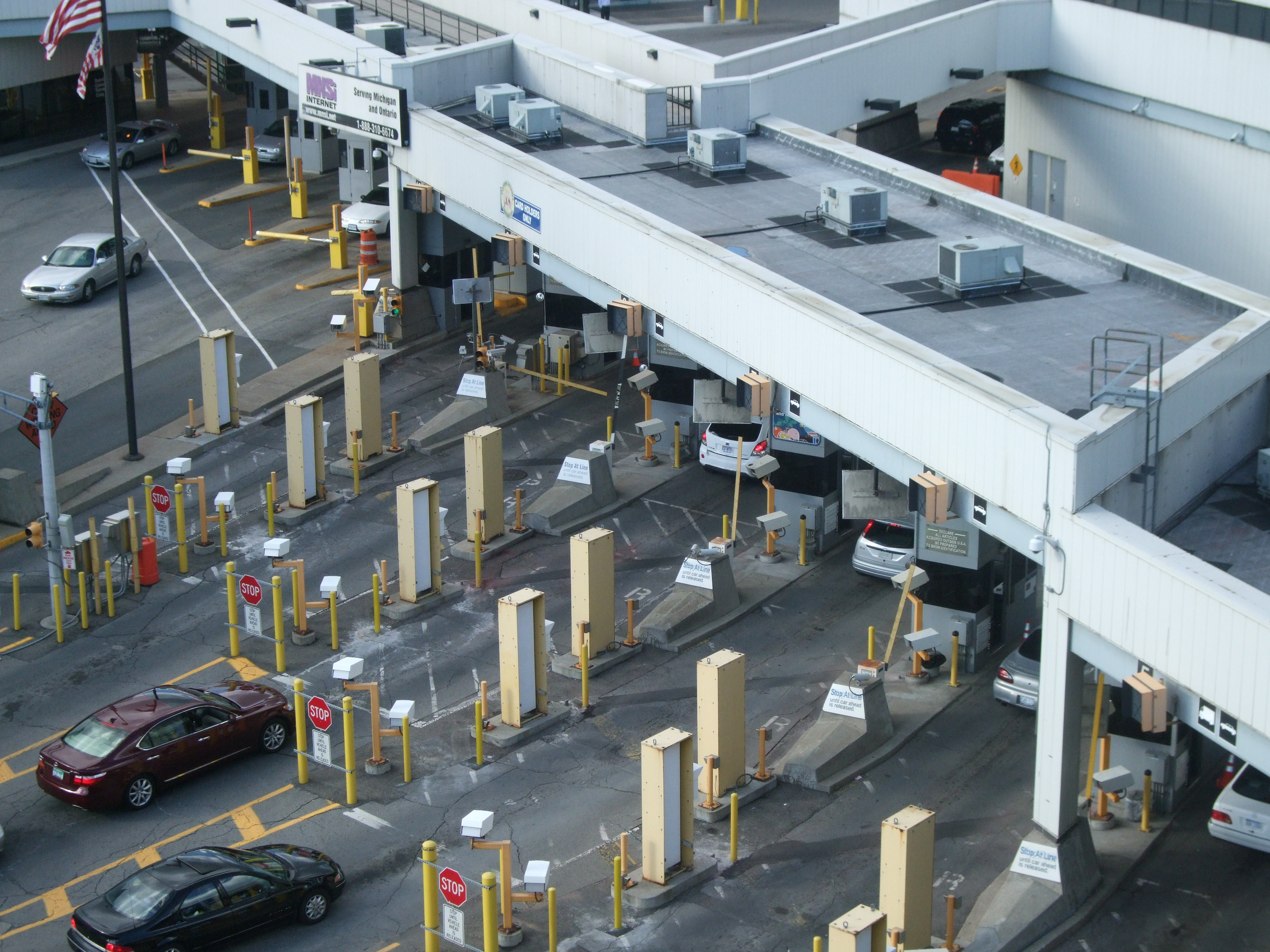
Detroit Customs stop

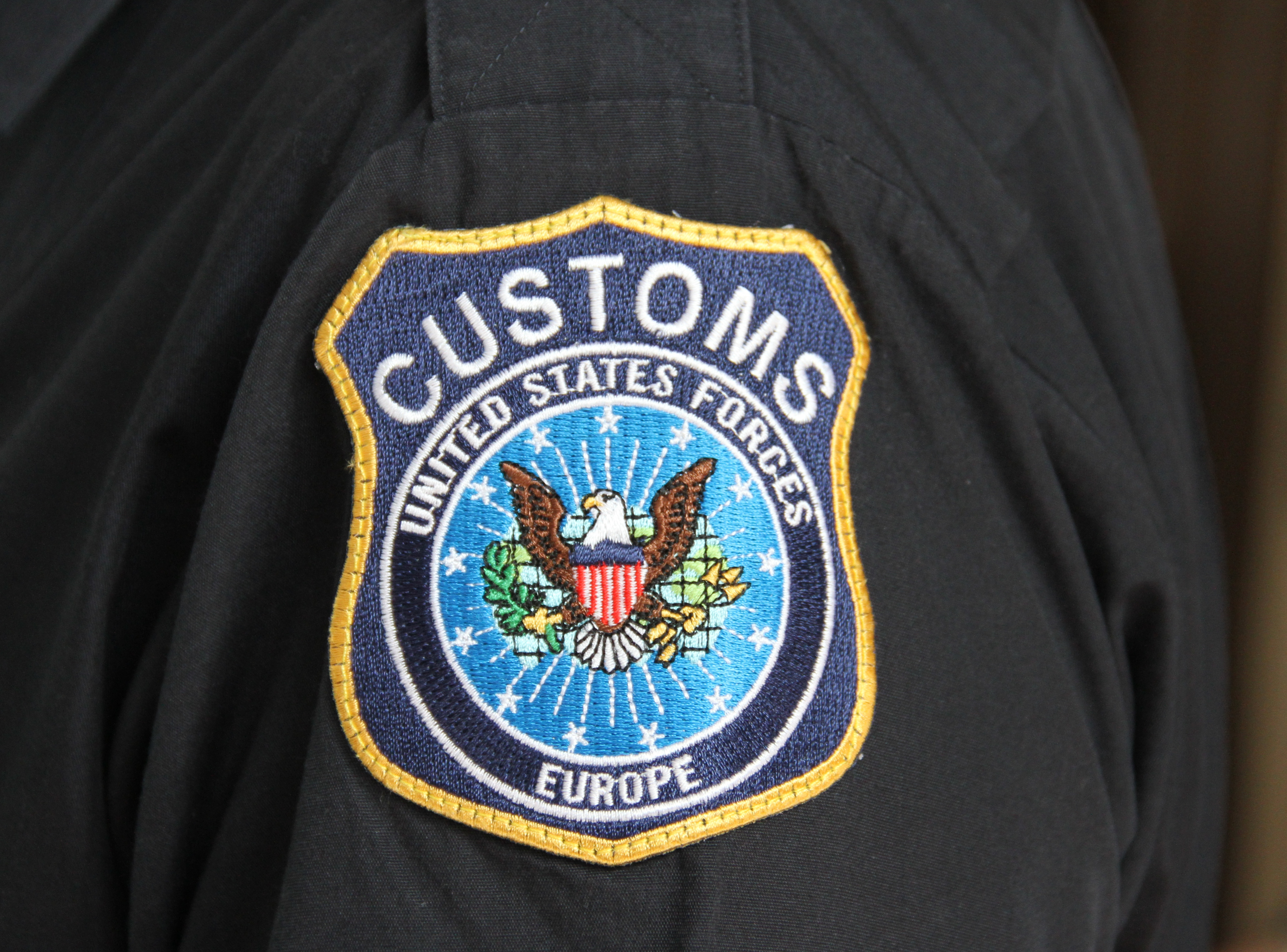
US Forces Customs patch

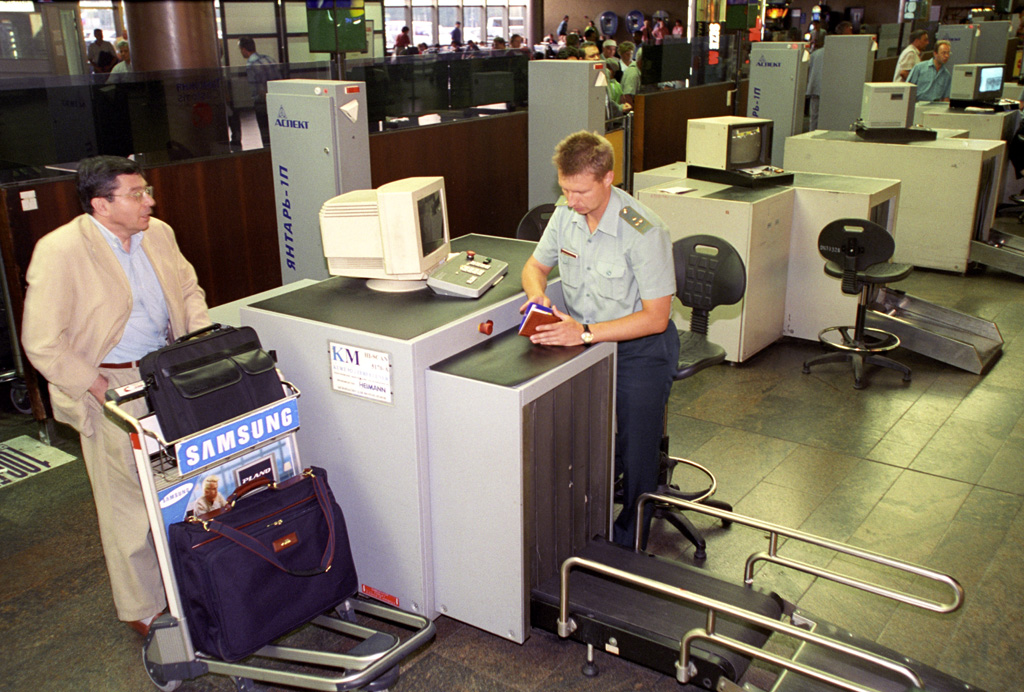
Customs control at Sheremetyevo-2 international airport

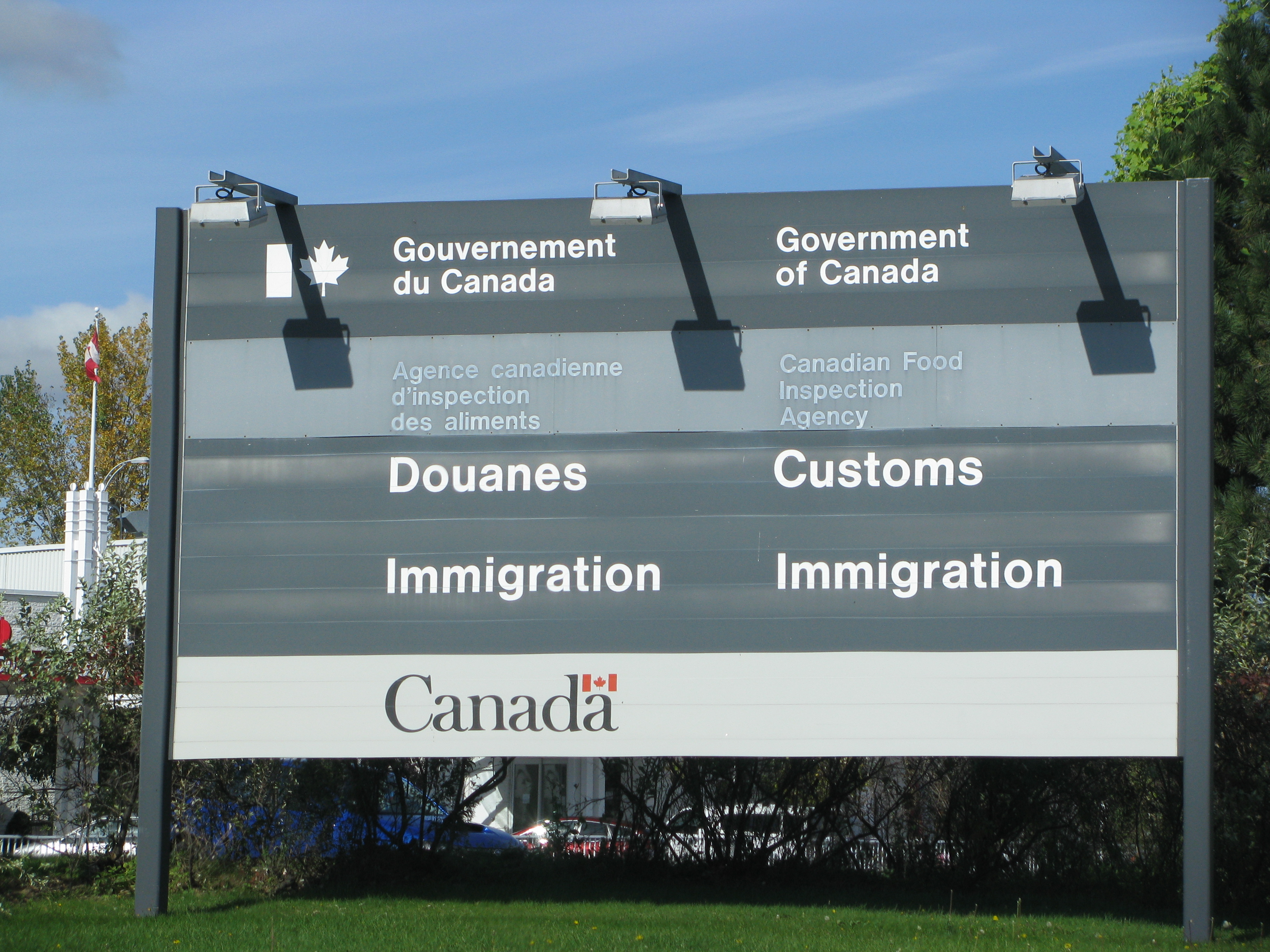
Canadian Customs and Immigration sign

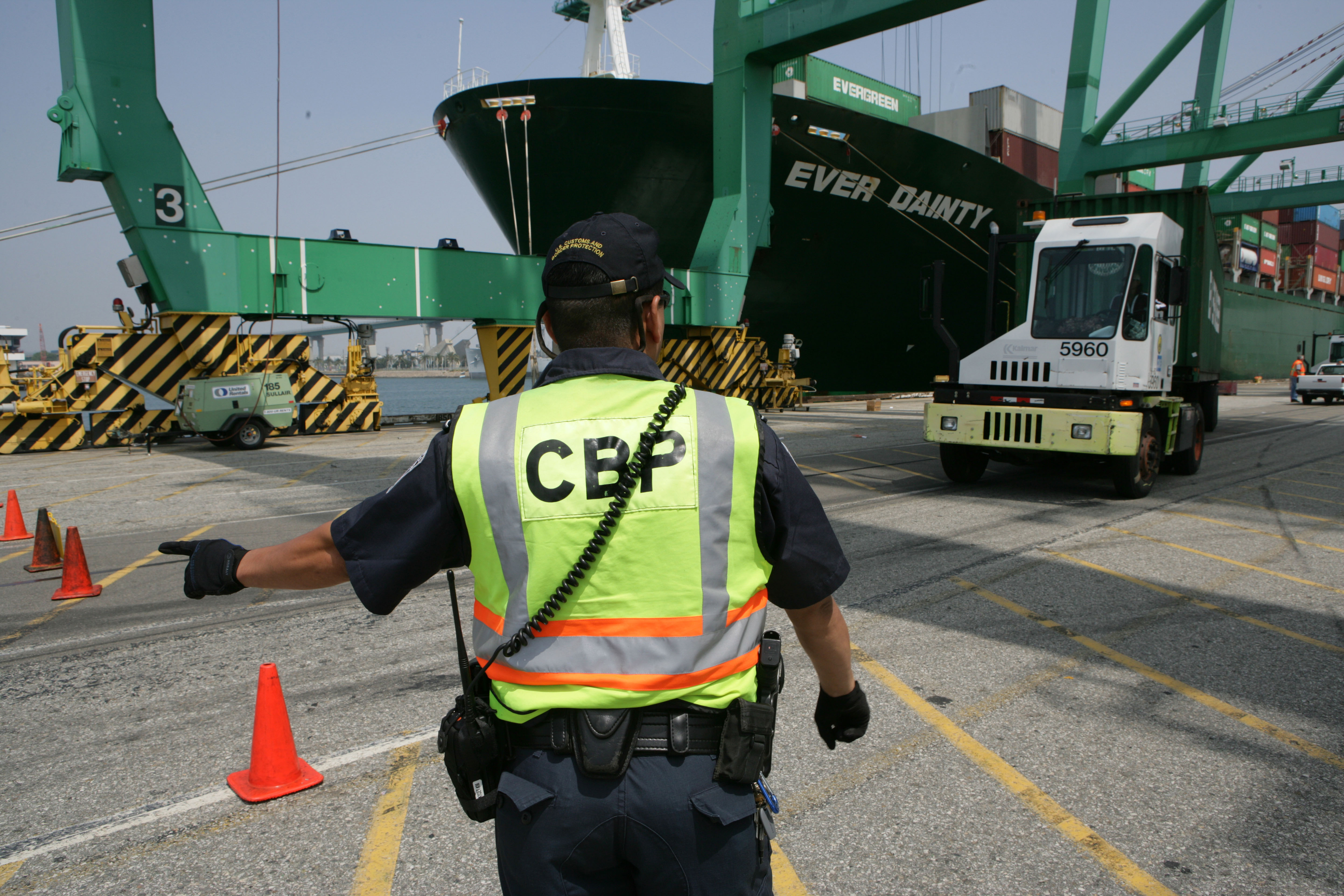
U.S. CBP officer directing a truck

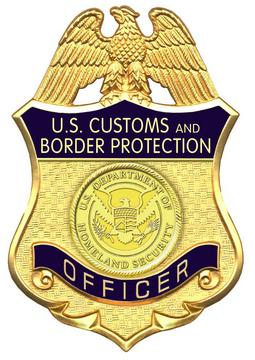
US CBP Badge

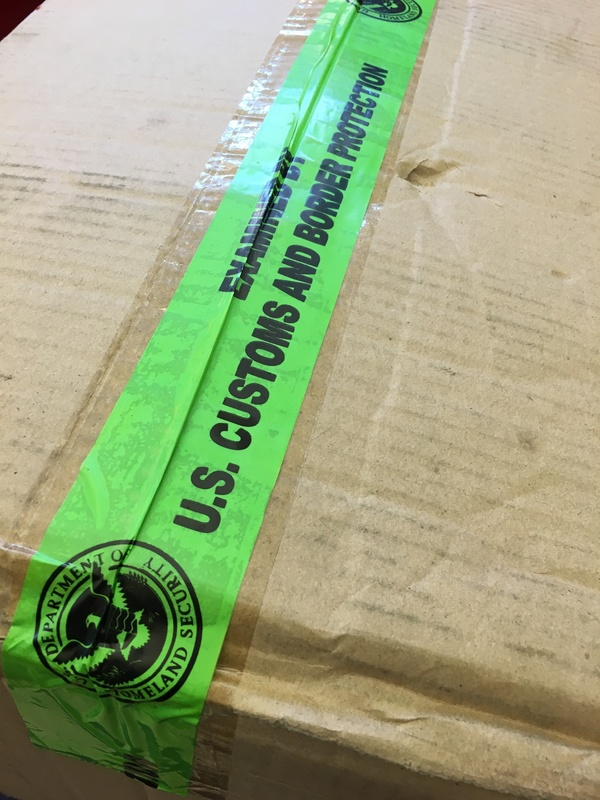
Tape used by U.S. Customs and Border Protection to reseal packages that they have searched, and to indicate that they have done so
