= Customs broker =

Workers filing customs documentations

Custom brokers or Customs House Brokerages are working positions that may be employed by or affiliated with freight forwarders, independent businesses, or shipping lines, importers, exporters, trade authorities, and customs brokerage firms.

== North America ==
=== United States ===
Customs brokers in the United States prepare and submit documentation to notify or obtain clearance from government agencies such as the U.S. Food and Drug Administration, the U.S. Department of Agriculture, and the Fish and Wildlife Service. They also arrange the transhipment (i.e., local delivery) of merchandise via trucking companies. Many customs brokers specialize in certain goods like apparel, perishables, or clearing the crew and manifest of large cargo vessels. Most are located at major airports and harbors with international traffic. With the advent of the Automated Broker Interface and rules allowing customs brokers to be permitted nationally (as opposed to specific ports), customs brokers no longer need to be located near a port.

==== Qualifications ====
US Customs broker licenses are issued and overseen by U.S. Customs and Border Protection (CBP). The requirements governing US Customs broker licenses, including eligibility, are laid out in Title 19, Part 111 of the United States Code of Federal Regulations (19 CFR 111). These regulations permit both individuals and companies to obtain Customs brokers licenses, though the application process and general rules governing each type of license differ from each other.

To be eligible to obtain for a US Customs broker license, an individual applicant must satisfy several requirements: he or she must pass the US Customs Broker License Exam (CBLE) with a score of 75% or higher; on or before the date of application, he or she must be a United States citizen, must have attained the age of 21, and must not be a federal employee; and he or she must be of good moral character. The individual must submit the license application, along with license application fee, within three years of passing the CBLE. This three year time limit is calculated from the date of the letter informing the examinee of passing the CBLE.

Upon receipt of a license application package, CBP reviews it on its merits.

License eligibility for non-individuals is different. To be eligible to obtain a US Customs broker license, a partnership must have at least one member of the partnership who is a broker. An association or corporation must be empowered under its articles of association or articles of incorporation to transact customs business as a broker, and have at least one officer who is a broker.

Customs broker licensees are not government employees and should not be confused with "customs officers" (in other countries the two terms may be interchangeable). Customs brokers need to be familiar with the tariff schedule, a listing of duty rates for imported items, CATAIR, the statutory and regulatory rules governing importations, and other trade related matters. To illustrate, a customs broker may need to advise an importer on the marking requirements of the country of origin, or complete paperwork for a clothing shipment subject to quotas and visa requirements. Knowing the requirements of each type of import can avoid delays, merchandise seizures, and fines and penalties that may be levied against the importer and/or broker.

=== Canada ===
In Canada customs brokers are licensed by the Canada Border Services Agency (Canada Customs) and most are members of the Canadian Society of Customs Brokers. The customs broker licenses are issued under the Customs Brokers Licensing Regulations (SOR /86-1067) and Section 9 of the Customs Act.

== European Union ==
For customs brokers and clearing agents operating within the European Union, there is no licensing system. The onus is firmly on the importer or exporter to ensure that any party acting on their behalf is in possession of the facts to do so.

Representation is governed by Article 18 of the Union Customs Code (Regulation (EU) No 952/2013), which recast and repealed the earlier Community Customs Code (Council Regulation (EEC) No 2913/92). Any person may appoint a customs representative, and the representation may be either direct, in which case the representative acts in the name of and on behalf of another person, or indirect, in which case it acts in its own name but on behalf of another person; a customs representative must be established within the customs territory of the Union, except where it acts on behalf of persons who are not themselves required to be so established.

A direct representative acts on behalf of the importer or exporter but does not itself become responsible for the customs debt arising from its actions, whereas an indirect representative is jointly and severally liable for that debt. In most cases the third party will elect to provide brokerage services on a direct representation basis, so the importer or exporter is exposed to the risk of error or omission by the customs broker.

== United Kingdom ==
Following the United Kingdom's withdrawal from the European Union, the appointment of a customs intermediary is governed by section 21 of the Taxation (Cross-border Trade) Act 2018, under which a principal may appoint a customs agent to make customs declarations on its behalf.

An agent may act either as a direct agent, making declarations in the name of the principal, in which case what the agent does is treated as done by the principal, or as an indirect agent, making declarations in its own name, in which case the agent is liable for the import duty alongside the principal. A direct agent also becomes personally liable for import duty where the appointment was not disclosed to HM Revenue and Customs, where it has been withdrawn, where the agent acted without authority, or where the declaration did not comply with the rules on simplified declarations. Appointing an agent does not remove the importer's own obligations; HMRC guidance states that the trader remains responsible for due diligence on its customs declarations.

== Asia ==
=== Kuwait ===
Kuwait Customs licensed by the General Directorate of Customs (Government of Kuwait-customs) It also requires several steps to obtain a license for. In addition to deposits. and some exams. He is able to clear all incoming/outgoing shipments. and collect all the necessary taxes on behalf of customs.

=== Saudi Arabia ===
Saudi Arabia follows the same rules and regulations. But the Kuwaiti customs broker cannot serve in Saudi borders and vice versa

=== Nepal ===
Nepal broadly follows the India model in the system of Customs process. The customs brokers here in Nepal are called Customs Agent / Bhansar Agent is appointed by the Department of Customs, Nepal. There are total of 170 Customs Agents in the fiscal year of 2076/77 to 2078/79 B.S. Most of the declarations are made online through Nepal Customs Automation System (NECAS) and some of done manually in the respective Customs Office.

Singapore

Singapore broadly follows the European Union model in that the importer or exporter of record remains liable for the correct and timely declaration of shipments. It is also however then similar to the US and Australia in requiring the person making the customs declaration to be registered and to have passed competency tests. All declarations are made online through Singapore Customs' Tradenet system using one of the Tradenet Front End applications licensed by Singapore Customs for that purpose.

Whilst there is no Customs Broker role explicitly recognised by Singapore Customs, there is separate recognition for the various service providers within the customs processing chain. These are as follows:

Declaring Entity - The declaring entity is the importer or exporter of record and whose Unique Identifying Number (UEN) is being used to make a declaration for import, export or transshipment.

Declaring Agent - A declaring agent is an organisation appointed by a declaring entity to make a declaration on its behalf. A declaring agent may be a freight forwarder or a specialist customs service provider such as Tradenet Services Pte Ltd (TNETS).

Declarant - A declarant is the individual person making the declaration for the declaring agent. Effective Jan 7, 2013 declarants must be registered with Singapore Customs and have passed Singapore Customs competency tests.

TradeNet Front End Solution Provider - A provider of software through which declarations to Singapore Customs' Tradenet system can be made.

The only service provider which provides an integrated service to declaring entities, and is therefore the most similar in Singapore to a customs broker, is Tradenet Services Pte Ltd (TNETS). TNETS is also the largest declaration service bureau processing more than 1.2 million Tradenet declarations per annum with a trade value of more than SGD100bn.

=== Pakistan ===
Customs Brokers are commonly known as Clearing Agents in Pakistan. They are licensed by Customs Authority under VIDE SRO 450(I)/2001 DATED 18-6-2001.

=== India ===
Customs Brokers are licensed by the Commissioner of Customs that has jurisdiction over the area where the applicant intends to carry out their business in India and are governed by the Customs Brokers Licensing Regulations 2018.

=== Philippines ===
Customs broker is a profession which expertise include tariff and customs laws, rules and regulations for the clearance of imported or exported goods or merchandise from customs authority, preparation of import or export documents including computation and payment of duties, taxes and other charges accruing thereon, representing clients before any government agency concerning classification or valuation of imported or exported goods AND is a bona fide holder of a valid license as such by the Professional Regulatory Board for Customs Brokers.

=== South Korea ===
Customs broker are licensed by customs authority. Customs broker should pass 2 separate exams. 1st test is multiple choice but 2nd test is essay-type. They should memorize major articles in customs law, valuation principles, HS headings with notes and international trade rules. E.g. UCP, CISG..

=== Sri Lanka ===
As in world practice, Sri Lanka Customs administers the customs house agent exams. The person seeking to become a customs house agent should have training in a cargo clearing company before applying for the Customs House Agent/ Wharf Assistance certificate course conducted by Sri Lanka Customs. There is an examination at the end of the course. Those passing the exam will be eligible to get the customs house agent. This is the first requirement to start a career as a customs broker. Customs House Agents are commonly known as CHA or wharf clerk.

== Latin America ==
=== Costa Rica ===
Customs broker are authorized by Directorate General of Customs (DGA), university degree requirement is Bachelor of Customs Administration and two years of experience, plus $10,000 bail with the first customs. There are heavy fines in case of error or wrong caculo tariff classification, being one of the riskier professions in Costa Rica.

=== Mexico ===
In Mexico a customs broker is an agente aduanal, who acts under a federal licence known as a patente aduanal. A new Customs Law published in November 2025 and in force from 1 January 2026 replaced the previously indefinite validity of these licences with a renewable twenty-year term, subject to re-certification every three years, and created a Customs Council (Consejo Aduanero) made up of representatives of the Ministry of Finance, the Tax Administration Service, the National Customs Agency and the anti-corruption secretariat, which grants, renews, suspends and cancels broker licences and agency authorisations. The same reform removed a provision that had relieved brokers of liability where a client supplied false or inaccurate information, and brokers now carry full legal responsibility for tariff classification and customs valuation.

== Oceania ==
=== Australia ===
In Australia, customs brokers are licensed by the Australian Customs and Border Protection Service

The relationship between a broker and client may begin before the actual importing of goods. A complicated scrutiny of Customs Duty, Tax rates and government trade regulations and Quarantine permission may have to be undertaken first. Brokers are trained and licensed to provide consultancy services of the above nature as accuracy is critical to the importer. Due to the brokers intimate knowledge of the client’s business activities their relationship can be difficult to break. When a broker receives the documents for a job they register it in the company system, then to process a customs entry they must:

- Classify goods in accordance with customs regulations
- Obtain relevant permits from the importer
- Process the customs entry in a ‘compile’ system, and;
- Pay duties and taxes on behalf of the importer

After the above is completed and clearance from customs has been given a complete dispatch is made. The customer must be sent invoices for disbursement then the cargo can be taken from the bonded warehouse and delivered to the customer’s nominated facility.

=== New Zealand ===
To operate as a customs broker in New Zealand, you need a Unique User Identification (UUI). UUI Accreditation can be achieved by sitting and passing three exams set by the Customs Brokers and Freight Forwarders Federation of New Zealand Inc (CBAFF).

== Other countries ==
Roles for customs brokers are broader than other country's one. From customs clearance, Customs compliance consulting up to administrative appeal.
