= SGAC =

SGAC may refer to:

- SG Arrival Card, a digital arrival card required by Singaporean immigration, mandatory for all travellers entering Singapore except those transiting without seeking immigration clearance, as well as residents entering via land-based checkpoints
- Space Generation Advisory Council, a non-governmental organization which aims to bring the views of students and young space professionals to the United Nations, Space Agencies and other organisations
- Student Global AIDS Campaign, an advocacy group with more than 85 chapters at high schools, colleges, and universities across the United States
