= Arrival card =

Border control document

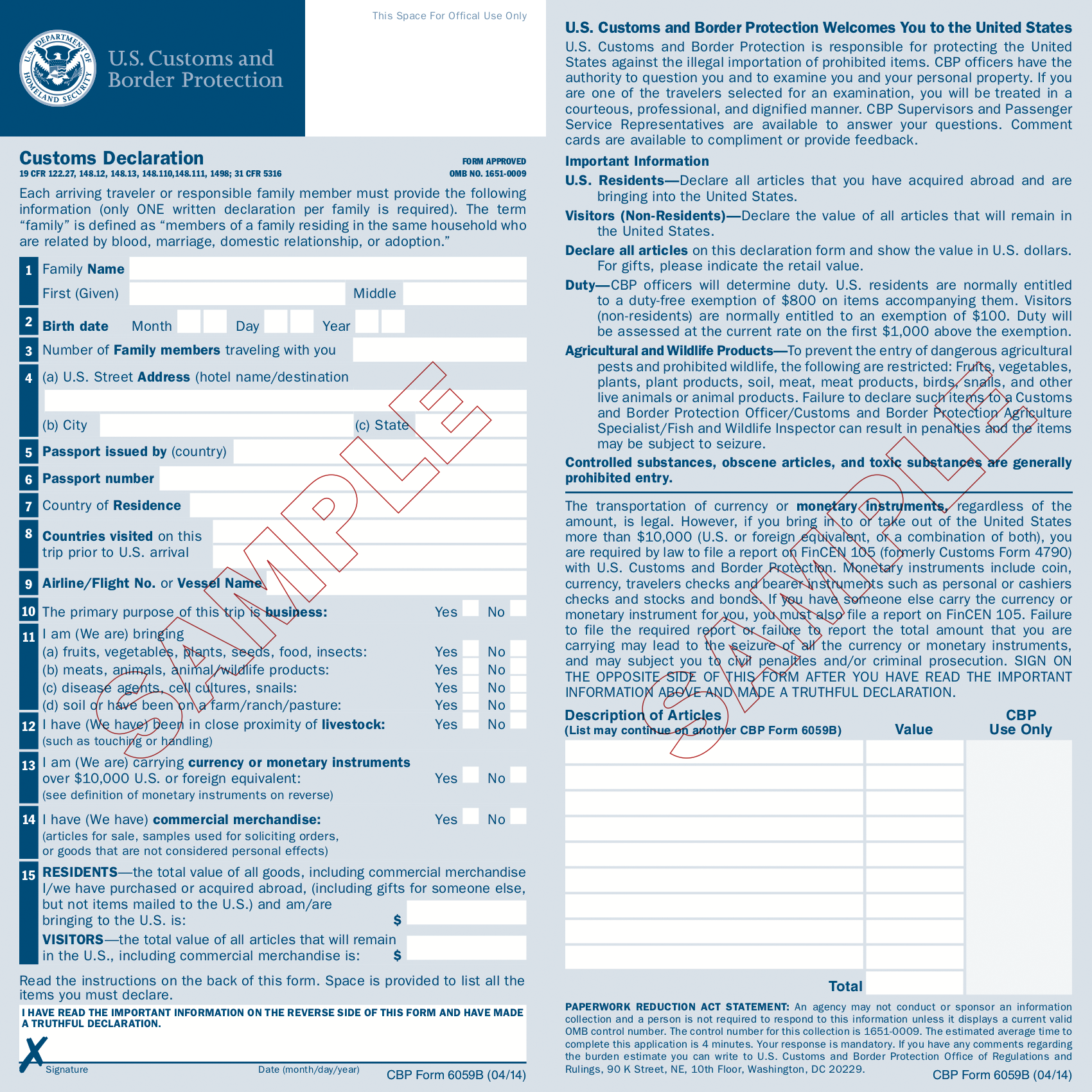
U.S. Customs and Border Protection Form 6059B (arrival card)

An arrival card, also known as an incoming passenger card, landing card or disembarkation card, is a legal document used by immigration authorities in many countries. It is used to obtain information about an incoming passenger which is not provided by the passenger's passport, such as health, criminal record, where they will be staying, purpose of the visit, etc. It is also used to provide a record of a person's entry into the country. The card may also provide information on health and character requirements for non-citizens entering the country. Some countries require an arrival card for each incoming passenger, while others require one card per family unit, and some only require an arrival card for non-citizens only.

Some countries, such as Thailand, attach a departure card to the arrival card, which is retained in the passenger's passport until their eventual departure. This arrival card can also be combined with a customs declaration, which some countries require incoming passengers to fill out separately.

Singapore (which switched to electronic cards) and the United States (following the introduction of the biometric recording system by the Immigration and Checkpoints Authority and the United States Customs and Border Protection respectively.) no longer requires compiling information from physical immigration cards. There is minimal cross-border formality between a number of countries, most notably those in the passport-free travel area of Europe's Schengen Area.

The requirement to produce an arrival card is usually in addition to a requirement to produce a passport or other travel document, to obtain a visa, and sometimes complete a customs declaration.

== Information on the card ==
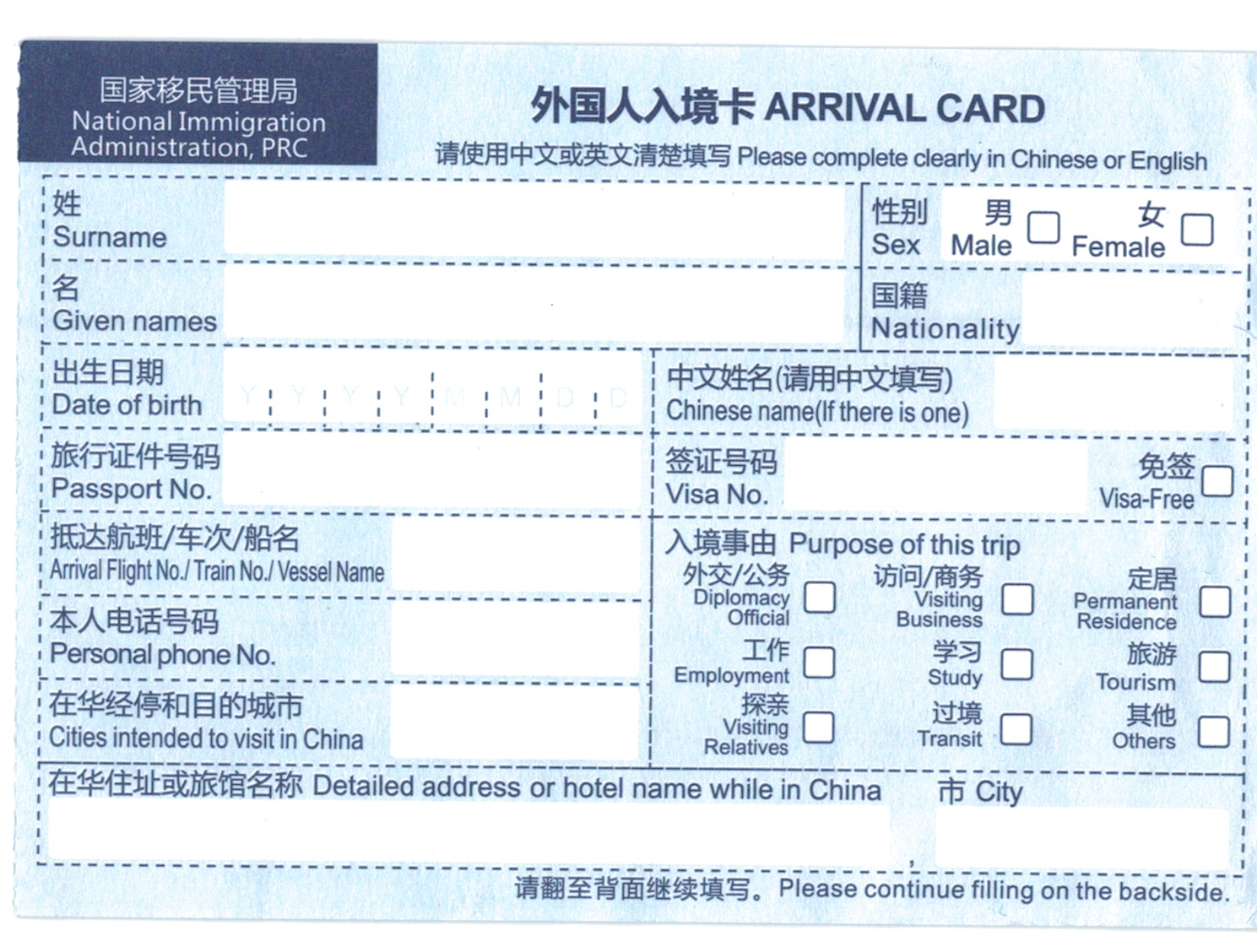
Information requested by a Chinese arrival card includes the passenger's information and details about their proposed trip.

The information requested varies by country. Typically, the type of information requested on the arrival card includes:

- Full name
- Nationality
- Date of birth
- Passport number, place of issuance and expiration date
- Flight number or name of aircraft, ship or vehicle
- Purpose of trip: vacation, education/study, visiting relatives/families, business, diplomatic
- Duration of stay
- Destination (next stop of disembarkation)
- Address in country
- Information on items being bought into the country which may be of interest to customs and quarantine authorities

Travellers are generally required to sign, date, and declare the information is true, correct, and complete.

== Electronic arrival cards ==
Some countries, such as China, Indonesia, Malaysia, Singapore, and Thailand, have retired physical arrival cards, switched to requiring passengers to submit their arrival cards electronically.

== United Kingdom ==
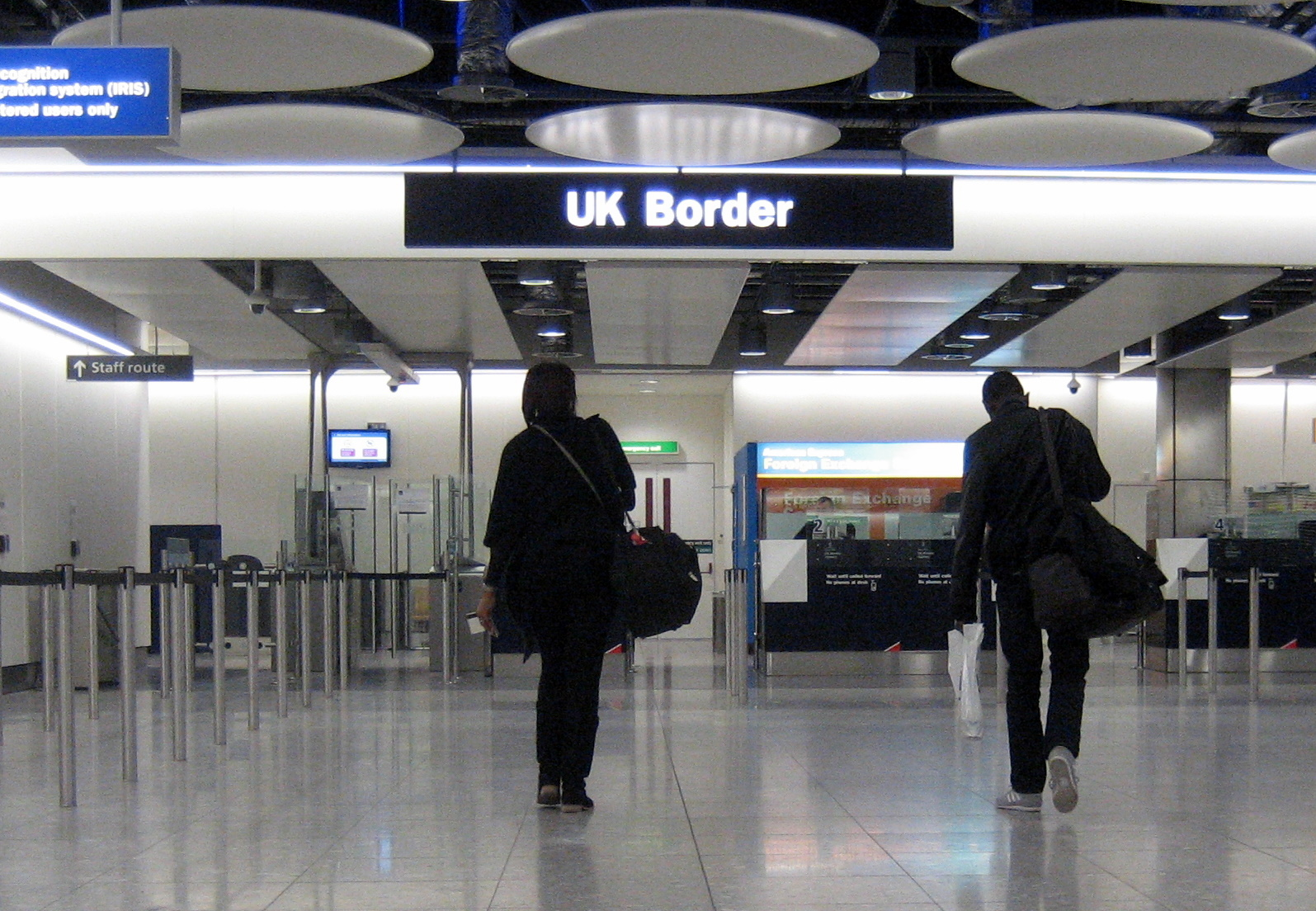
Border Force officers staff the UK border at Heathrow Terminal 5, where landing cards were turned in

Non-EEA citizens were formerly required to complete a landing card on entry to the United Kingdom. The traveller was required to present the completed form at the Border Force desk at the point of entry. The form was usually supplied by the airline, train, or ferry company.

In the UK, the landing card system was governed by the Immigration Act 1971, schedule 2 paragraph 5, which states:

The Secretary of State may by order made by statutory instrument make provision for requiring passengers disembarking or embarking in the United Kingdom, or any class of such passengers, to produce to an immigration officer, if so required, landing or embarkation cards in such form as the Secretary of State may direct, and for requiring the owners or agents of ships and aircraft to supply such cards to those passengers.

In August 2017, the Home Office announced that landing cards would be completely scrapped as part of Digital Border Transformation and Modernization. This change was expected to come into effect by Autumn of that year. Landing cards were abolished for all passengers effective 20 May 2019.

Information on the purpose of the trip, destination, or any items brought into the country was absent from the landing card. Travellers were asked for additional information about their occupation and the port of their last departure.

== See also ==
- Airport check-in
- Airline ticket
- Boarding pass
- Departure card
- Passport
- Visa
- Migration card
- Immigration Act 1971
- Visa policy of the United Kingdom
