= Peter Douglas Koon =

Hong Kong clergyman and politician (born 1966)

The Reverend Canon The Honourable Peter Douglas Koon BBS JP OStJ
- 管浩鳴
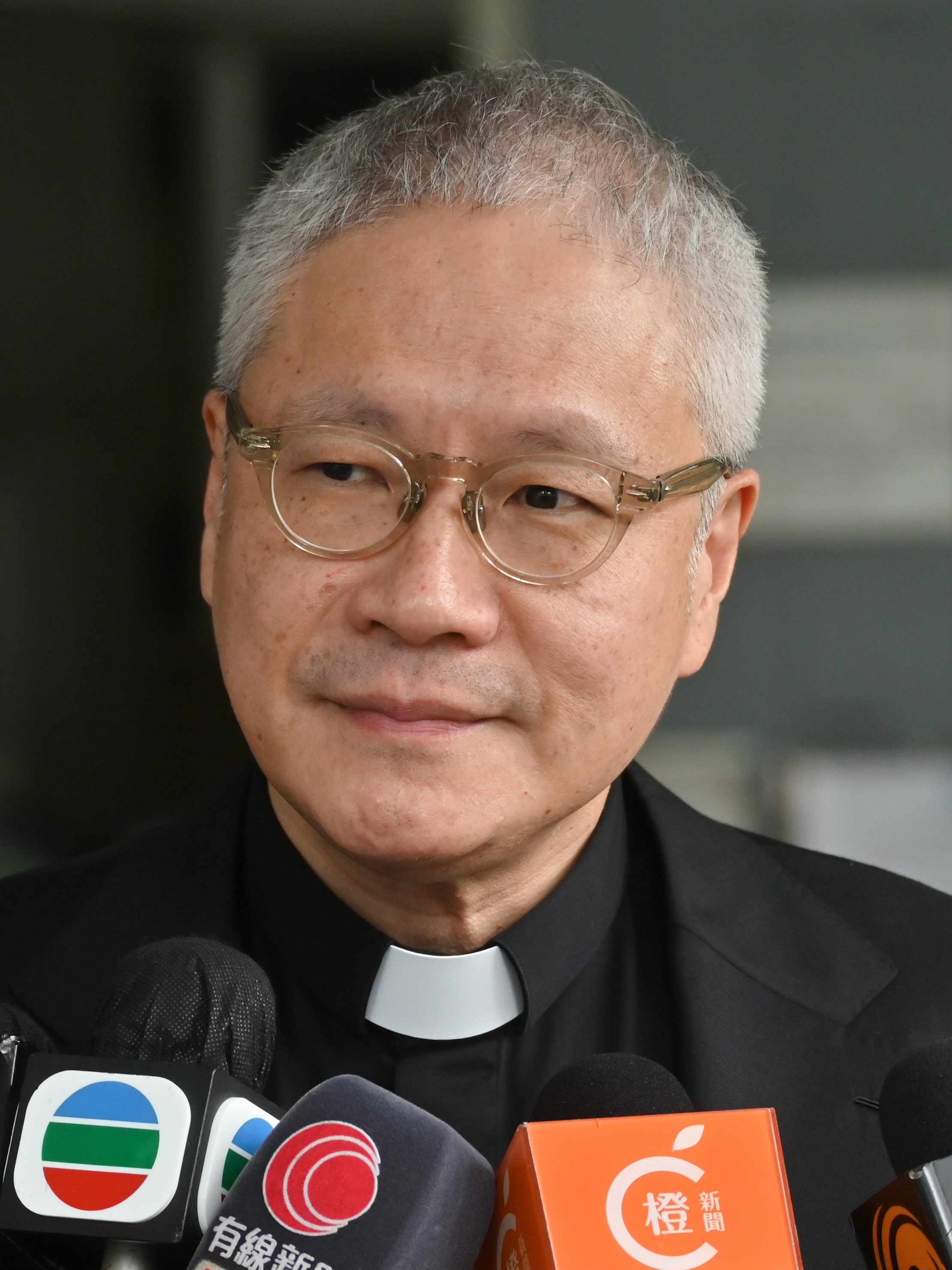
- Koon in 2025

Member of the Legislative Council
- Incumbent
- Assumed office 1 January 2022
- Preceded by: Constituency created
- Constituency: Election Committee

Member of the Beijing Municipal Committee of the Chinese People’s Political Consultative Conference
- Incumbent
- Assumed office 2018

Provincial Secretary General of the Hong Kong Sheng Kung Hui
- In office 2007–2021

Personal details
- Born: 1966 (age 59–60)

Peter Douglas Koon Ho-ming, BBS, JP, OStJ (Chinese: 管浩鳴; born 1966) is the provincial secretary general of Hong Kong Sheng Kung Hui (HKSKH) and a chaplain of HKSKH St John's Cathedral. He is also a member of the Election Committee since 2021 and 13th Beijing Municipal Committee of the Chinese People’s Political Consultative Conference (CPPCC).

== Priesthood ==
Koon has been provincial secretary general of the Hong Kong Sheng Kung Hui (HKSKH) since 2007 and is the chairman of the council of the SKH St Christopher's Home and the honorary secretary of the executive committee of HKSKH Welfare Council. He is also the head of the Anglican (Hong Kong) Early Childhood Education Council and the supervisor and manager several of Anglican schools in Hong Kong including St. Stephen's Girls' College where he is the chairman. Koon followed a relatively mild view toward LGBT community in accordance to his Communion, objecting to discrimination occurring in conservative schools and emphatically assured the LGBT community that Anglican schools would be accepting of LGBT faculty and students in 2015.

== Political career ==
Koon joined former Chief Executive Tung Chee-hwa's Our Hong Kong Foundation, which was filled with senior pro-Beijing politicians, as an adviser in 2014. In 2017, he was appointed by the government to sit on the Committee on the Promotion of Civic Education and the Curriculum Development Council. In 2018, he was elected to the 13th Beijing Municipal Committee of the Chinese People’s Political Consultative Conference (CPPCC).

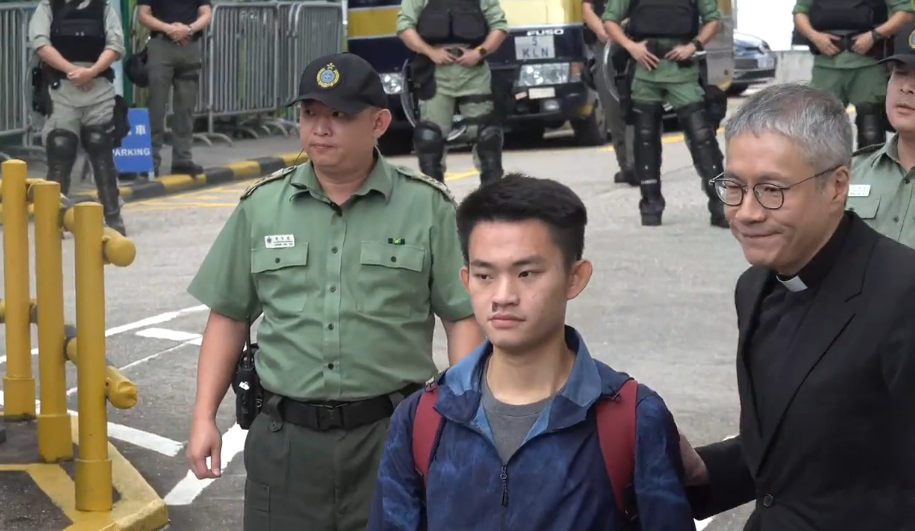
Reverend Peter Douglas Koon (right) accompanied Chan Tong-kai (centre) who was released from the Pik Uk Correctional Institution on 23 October 2019.

In the murder case of Poon Hiu-wing which led the Carrie Lam government to introduce the amendment to the existing extradition law that triggered the widespread anti-extradition protests in 2019, Koon became a spokesman for murder suspect Chan Tong-kai and has provided support to Chan after he was released from prison on money laundering charges relating to the murder case on 23 October 2019. Koon said he had persuaded Chan to surrender himself to Taiwan but Chan failed to turn himself in due to the diplomatic complications between China and Taiwan, even after years of his release.

After the drastic overhaul of the Hong Kong electoral system imposed by Beijing in 2021, Koon was elected uncontestedly as one of the 1,500 members of Election Committee which was responsible for electing the Chief Executive and 40 of the 90 members in the Legislative Council in the September Election Committee subsector election. In the December 2021 Legislative Council election, Koon decided to run in the Election Committee constituency which was elected by not more than 1,500 members of the Election Committee which he was a member himself.

In September 2023, after Koon suggested that St John's Cathedral put up the flag of China during a service, Koon said "Hongkongers are simply overreacting" when some people objected to the change.

In 2025, during the Same-sex Registration Bill debate, Koon once intended to abstain from voting on the bill, however due to lobbying from religious sector, he eventually switched sides to veto the bill.

In December 2025, he was re-elected as legislative councilor.

== Honours ==
- Order of the Hospital of St John of Jerusalem (OStJ) (2016)
- Bronze Bauhinia Star (BBS) (2017)

Legislative Council of Hong Kong
Preceded by Constituency created	Member of the Legislative Council; Representative for Election Committee; 2022–present	Succeeded by present
