= Immigration and Checkpoints Authority =

Border control agency of Singapore

Agency overview
- Formed: 1 April 2003; 23 years ago
- Preceding agencies: Singapore Immigration and Registration; Customs and Excise Department

Jurisdictional structure
- Operations jurisdiction: Singapore
- Governing body: Government of Singapore
- Constituting instruments: Immigration Act; Passports Act; National Registration Act

Operational structure
- Headquarters: 2 Crawford Street, Singapore 207218
- Elected officers responsible: K Shanmugam, Minister for Home Affairs; Edwin Tong, 2nd Minister for Home Affairs
- Agency executives: Lian Ghim Hua, Commissioner, ICA; SAC Hsu Sin Yun, Dy Commissioner (Operations); DC Ong Choon Beng, Dy Commissioner (Policy & Transformation); SAC Benjamin Chia Jin Ming, Dy Commissioner (Capability & Technology Development)
- Parent agency: Ministry of Home Affairs

Website
- www.ica.gov.sg

The Immigration and Checkpoints Authority (Note: Chinese: 移民與關卡局；Malay: Penguasa Imigresen dan Pusat Pemeriksaan; Tamil: குடிநுழைவு சோதனைச் சாவடிகள் ஆணையம், romanized: Kuṭinuḻaivu cōtaṉaic cāvaṭikaḷ āṇaiyam) (ICA) is a law enforcement agency within the Ministry of Home Affairs (MHA), the border control agency responsible for frontline border control operations at air, sea and rail ports in Singapore.

ICA was formed on 1 April 2003 after the restructuring of the preceding agencies responsible for customs and immigration control, the Singapore Immigration and Registration (SIR) and the Customs and Excise Department (CED). It is accountable directly to the MHA, which is under the purview of the Government of Singapore and its relevant ministers.

Its responsibilities include immigration and customs controls and the screening of passengers, freight and port staff at the country's rail, air and sea ports, as well as dozens of smaller airstrips, ports and marinas. In addition, their duties also include counter-terrorism, part of which is to detect and deter the illicit importation of radioactive and nuclear material by terrorists or criminals.

== Organization ==
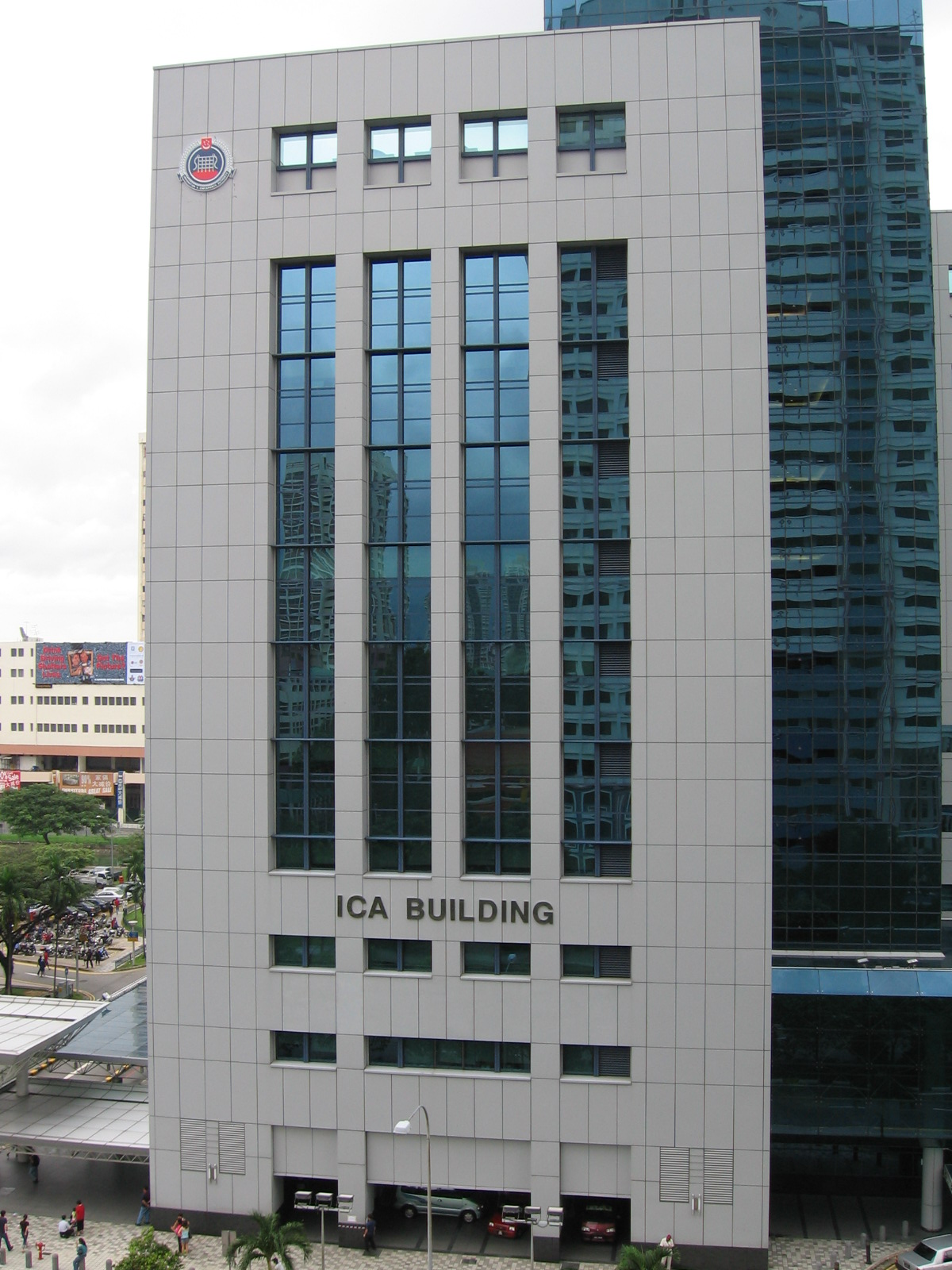
The ICA Building at Kallang Road. ICA counter services is only for services that cannot be done or completed online.

=== Overview ===
ICA oversees most immigration and identification related matters in Singapore. At its Kallang Road headquarters, services are provided from "cradle to grave", starting from birth registration to the issuance of identity cards and finally to the registering of deaths. ICA also carries out its border control duties on both goods and people at most ports of entries in Singapore.

==== Legal Powers ====
Civil servants in ICA employed under the Home Affairs Services scheme (legally defined as "immigration officers") primarily enforce the Immigration Act (Cap 133) and the Passports Act (Cap 220). ICA also enforces the National Registration Act (Cap 201).

Immigration officers can prohibit entry to any person or class of persons for any reason related to the conditions of Singapore. Since 2018, immigration officers have policing powers of search and arrest within the checkpoints and in their immediate vicinity. Under the Integrated Checkpoints Command (ICC) concept, ICA is ultimately responsible for border security at Singapore's checkpoints.

ICA issues different passes to facilitate the entry of aliens arriving in Singapore, such as the Visit Pass, Landing Pass or the Dependent's Pass.

ICA officers deployed as cargo and baggage examination officers are empowered under the Customs Act (Cap 70) to search people and conveyances at all ports of entry in Singapore. They can then seize any controlled items or contraband found before referring them to the appropriate Controlling Agency such as Singapore Customs or the Central Narcotics Bureau (CNB). The most common contraband are duty-unpaid cigarettes and tobacco products due to the high duties imposed on them. Other examples include narcotics, replica firearms, wild animals and unlicensed medicine.

==== Immigration enforcement ====
Immigration offenders are referred to ICA's Enforcement Division (ED) which oversees investigation, prosecution and repatriation matters. Investigation officers will investigate potential offences, interview suspects and witnesses and share information with other agencies if necessary. Prosecution officers from ICA work together with deputy public prosecutors at the Attorney-General's Chambers to ensure that offenders are lawfully detained and given trial. Examples of common offences include the harbouring of immigration offenders, employing immigrants illegally or entering marriages of convenience. Home owners who have been found guilty of renting their houses to immigration offenders and not carrying out one or more of the mandatory checks may be sentenced to a jail term, fine or both.

==== Counter-terrorism ====
ICA is Singapore's first line of defence against potential terrorist threats by restricting the movement of security sensitive persons across international borders. ICA also works closely with other agencies such as the Police and ISD to prevent terrorist attacks from occurring in Singapore. After the escape of Mas Selamat in 2008, all checkpoints immediately stepped up security checks. During the lead-up to the 2018 Trump-Kim Summit, Home Affairs Minister K. Shanmugam revealed that four people had been turned away at the checkpoints for terrorism related reasons.

ICA is part of the Inter-Agency Coordination Group within the Republic of Singapore Navy's Maritime Security Task Force. ICA participated in the 2011 Exercise Northstar, in which immigration officers boarded ships to check for immigration offenders, firearms and explosives. ICA also participated in the 2013 Exercise Highcrest which simulated terrorist attacks on one of Singapore's checkpoints.

In 2020, ICA stepped up its security measures and increased patrols after a series of terrorist attacks in France. Sixteen foreigners were also repatriated after investigations by ISD.

==== Services Centres ====
ICA has three services centres which caters to the different demographics in Singapore.

The Citizen Services Centre issues the pink National Registration Identity Card (NRIC), the certificate of citizenship and the Singaporean passport. The Registry of Births and Deaths is also under the Citizen Services Centre.

The Permanent Resident Centre issues the blue NRIC for permanent residents as well as entry and re-entry permits.

The Visitor Services Centre issues visit pass extensions, visas and long term visit passes.

=== Structure ===
ICA is divided into staff and line units. Staff units are involved in manpower, training and corporate services. Line units deal with the front-line operations of ICA. The senior executive management is called the Leadership Group (LG).

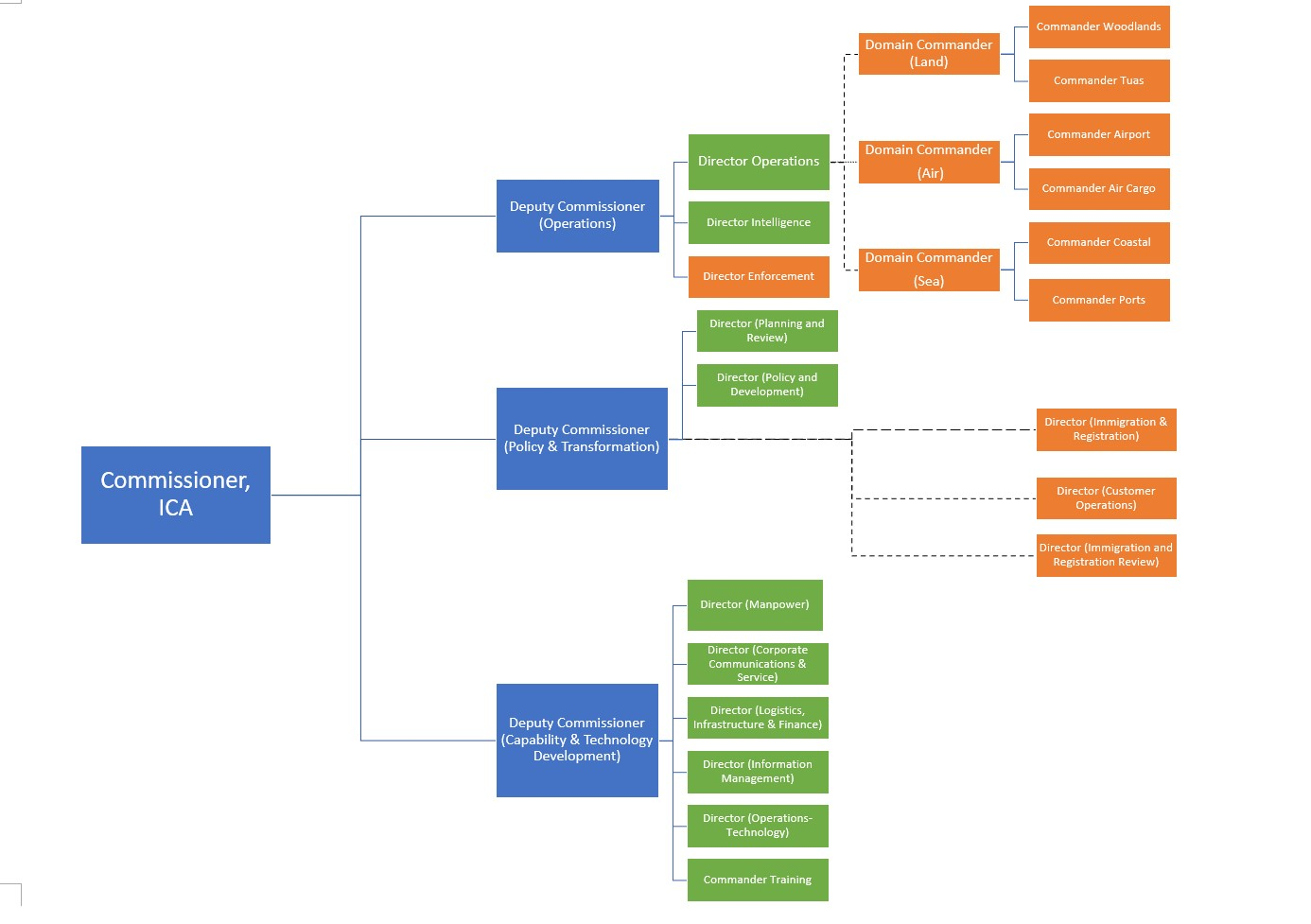
ICA organization chart. Orange = line units. Green = staff units

Leadership Group
Appointment	Rank	Name	Notes
Commissioner (ICA)	Commissioner	Marvin Sim	From CNB
Deputy Commissioner (Operations)	Deputy Commissioner	Hsu Sin Yun	From SPF
Deputy Commissioner (Policy & Transformation)	Deputy Commissioner	Cora Chen	
Deputy Commissioner (Corporate Development & Administration)	Deputy Commissioner	Ong Choon Beng	
Director Manpower	MX	Pravina Jit	
Director Operations			
Director Intelligence	Assistant Commissioner	Wong Hong Meng	
Domain Commander (Sea)	Assistant Commissioner	Chua Sze How	
Domain Commander (Land)	Senior Assistant Commissioner	Chua Tuan Meng	
Domain Commander (Air)	Senior Assistant Commissioner	Sng Gek Lian Julia	
Director Enforcement	Assistant Commissioner	Nam Liang Chia	
Commander Airport	Assistant Commissioner	Alan Koo	
Commander Woodlands	Assistant Commissioner	Colin Tan	
Commander Tuas	Deputy Assistant Commissioner	Jackson Tan	
Commander Coastal	Assistant Commissioner	Chia Hoi Mun	
Commander Ports	Assistant Commissioner	Lian Lee Siong	
Commander Air Cargo	Assistant Commissioner	Maran S/O V K Subrahmaniyan	
Commander Training	Assistant Commissioner	Ernest Soo	
Director Immigration and Registration	Senior Assistant Commissioner	Dominic Chua	
Director Immigration and Registration Review	Senior Assistant Commissioner	Siew Chui Lin	
Director Customer Operations	Senior Assistant Commissioner	Angie Wong	
Director Corporate Communications and Service	Assistant Commissioner	Sharon Wong	
Director Policy and Development	Assistant Commissioner	Chui Wai Cheng	
Director Information Management	Assistant Commissioner	Chia Hui Keng	
Director Technology	-	Tan Sor Hoon	
Director Logistics, Infrastructure and Finance	Assistant Commissioner	Yong Koi Hin	
Director Operations-Technology	Assistant Commissioner	Theodore Tan	

== History ==
=== Early years (1915–1964) ===
==== Immigration and Registration Department ====
When the Straits Settlement was first established, immigration control was minimal to facilitate free trade. Entry control began when the colonial government enacted the Quarantine and Prevention of Disease Ordinance in 1915. In 1933, the Immigration Department was established to administer the Aliens Ordinance which placed quotas on newcomers entering Singapore. This effectively ended the freedom of travel in Singapore.

Ordinance No. 5 of 1952 (The Immigration Ordinance) came into force on 1 August 1953, setting the foundation of immigration law in Singapore. The Immigration Ordinance was amended in 1959 after Singapore was granted sovereignty. The amendment gave Singaporeans the right of entry into the Colony. A new Immigration Depot was built at Telok Ayer Basin (East Wharf) while the head office was moved to Empress Place Building. Round-the-clock immigration clearance for vessels was started 1 June 1961.

Birth registration started in 1872 which was then used for health and statistical purposes. However, by 1938 registration of births became compulsory by law. At the start of the second World War, the British introduced paper identity cards for the first time. This was suspended after the British surrender in 1942. The colonial government began issuing identity cards again in 1948 to counter the communist insurgency. The desire to limit the entry of those who might have communist sympathies extended to the creation of a new Immigration Bill in 1950. When Singapore merged with Malaya, Sabah and Sarawak to form the Federation of Malaysia in 1963, immigration came under the jurisdiction of the federal government and the Immigration Department became a federal agency in Kuala Lumpur.

==== Customs and Excise ====
Customs control was started when the Monopolies Department was founded in 1910 to collect excise duties on goods such as hard liquors and opium. In 1916, the colonial government began taxing tobacco products on import to raise funds for the war effort. In 1932, the Customs headquarters was shifted to the Customs House from Cecil Street. The Excise Department replaced the Monopolies Department in 1936 and in 1938, the Excise Department was renamed the Department of Customs & Excise.

=== Post-independence (1965–2002) ===
==== Stricter immigration control ====
After Singapore separated from Malaysia on 9 August 1965, freedom of movement continued to exist between the two countries for a short period of time. Two border checkpoints were gazetted for travel between the two countries. They were the Tanjong Pagar Railway Station and the Woodlands Checkpoint. Malaysians had to produce identity cards to be able to enter Singapore, until passports were required on both sides in July 1967. To travel to Peninsular Malaysia, the Singapore restricted passport and the Singapore Certificate of Identity was required. The Restricted Passport Centre was at South Quay and was moved to Outram Road in 1976, but closed on 31 December 1994.

In the 1970s, illegal immigration and over-stayers became a serious problem in Singapore. A task force was set up in 1974 to deal with the immigration problem. Laws were introduced that allowed immigration officers to seize and detain vessels and vehicles used to convey illegal immigrants. Those who harboured or employed illegal immigrants could also be punished. Data on foreigners' movements within Singapore were processed by the new Immigration Data Processing Centre.

The Last Port Clearance was introduced in 1980 to attract more passenger liners to Singapore.

A passport office was opened at Joo Chiat Complex in 1984. This office issued both international and restricted passports and was closed in 1999. The Immigration Department moved its head office to the Pidemco Centre in June 1986. Immigration officers were also deployed to places such as India and Hong Kong to open consulates and high commissions. All passports issued by Singapore immigration after 1990 were computerised and machine-readable. The Entry and Exit Control Integrated System implemented in the early 1990s was a computerized immigration system that was used at checkpoints to speed up the processing of travellers. A hotline for information was set up in 1992, with restricted access to countries lifted.

==== National Registration Office ====
The independence of Singapore in 1965 brought with it the National Registration Act in 1966. The distinctive pink identity cards were issued for the first time. The National Registration Office (NRO) replaced the former Registry of Persons.

At the time, the NRO and the Registry of Births and Deaths (RBD) came under the former Ministry of Labour. The Registry of Societies (ROS), Martial Arts Control Unit (MACU) came under the Ministry of Home Affairs. On 16 October 1981, the NRO, RBD, ROC, MACU and ROS merged to form the National Registration Department (NRD). The NRD consisted of four registries: the Registry of Births and Deaths, the Registry of Citizens, the Registry of Societies and the National Registration Office. The NRD was located at the Empress Place Building until 1986 when the building was transformed into the now defunct Empress Place Museum.

==== Customs and Excise Department ====
Tobacco, liquor, motor vehicles and petroleum became restricted goods after Singapore was granted independence as a sovereign nation. The Customs and Excise Department (CED) cooperated closely with other government agencies such as the Agri-Food & Veterinary Authority and the Central Narcotics Bureau. When the GST was introduced in 1994, the work scope of the CED was expanded. The red and green channel customs system was implemented in 1991 in Changi Airport and at sea checkpoints.

The CED was located first at Cecil Street from 1910 till 1932 and later the White House at Maxwell Road from 1932 until 1989 when it moved to World Trade Centre (now HarbourFront Centre).

==== Singapore Immigration and Registration ====
In 1995, the Immigration Department was renamed Singapore Immigration. An immigration checkpoint was established at the Changi Ferry Terminal in May that year. There was a change in the passport application and collection in the 1990s, reducing the need for applicants to report to the building. To further reduce that need, applications by mail and internet were introduced and rebates were given for such applications.

A new logo was launched by then-Minister for Home Affairs, Wong Kan Seng, at the foundation stone ceremony for the SI Building in 1995. The West Coast Barter Trade Centre closed in June 1995. Singaporeans were then sent renewal forms for passports nine months before their passports expired.

SI became an autonomous agency in 1996 as well as launching its first website. All immigration offices moved from the Pidemco Centre to the new building at Kallang Road in 1997. The Singapore Immigration and the National Registration Department merged to form Singapore Immigration & Registration in 1998. A new land checkpoint at Tuas was opened on 2 January.

=== 21st century: Merger and integration (2003–present) ===
On 1 April 2003, SIR and the border control functions of CED were merged to form ICA in response to the 9/11 attacks and the Jemaah Islamiyah plots. The remaining functions of the CED was reorganised and renamed into Singapore Customs. ICA was to be part of the Home Team and a new, blue uniform was introduced to reflect that change. The first Commissioner of ICA was Lock Wai Han, who was in the Singapore Police Force before he oversaw the merger of the two agencies.

ICA's first major challenge came with the Severe Acute Respiratory Syndrome (SARS) epidemic in 2003, testing the agency's ability to control Singapore's borders and screen passengers for contagious diseases.

In 2005, the then-Director CNB Eric Tan became the Commissioner of the ICA.

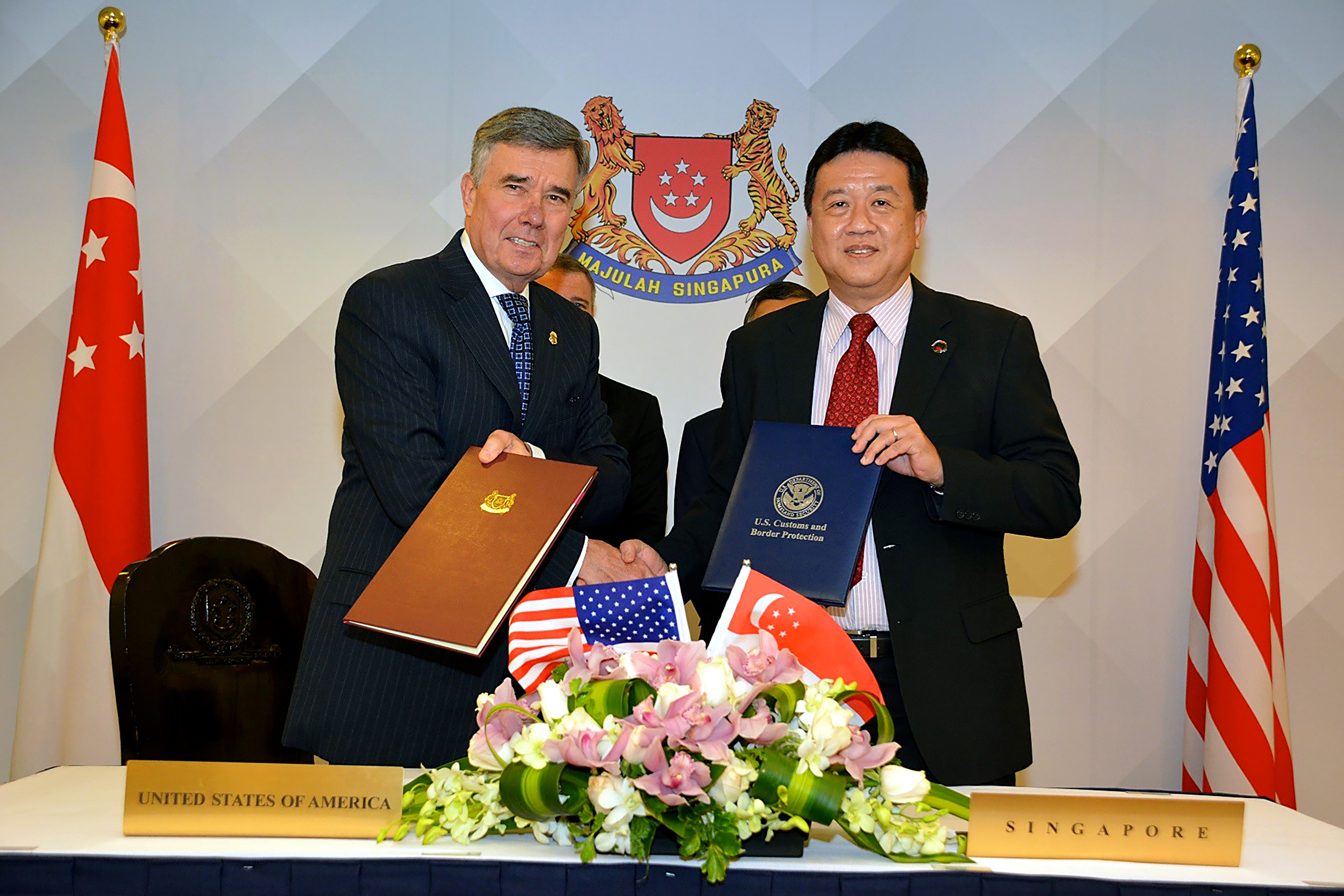
Clarence Yeo (right), then-Commissioner of ICA

In 2010, Deputy Commissioner Clarence Yeo became the Commissioner of the ICA.

On 1 July 2011, Keretapi Tanah Melayu Berhad (KTMB) and the Malaysian CIQ agencies were relocated to the Woodlands Train Checkpoint (WTCP). From then on, all arriving and departing trains terminated and started at WTCP.

==== Integrated Checkpoints Command ====
On 2 January 2015, the Integrated Checkpoints Command concept was introduced. Under the Integrated Checkpoints Command, ICA checkpoints are split into three domains: Land, Sea and Air. Each domain is headed by a Domain Commander who reports directly to the Commissioner. All Home Team agencies deployed at the checkpoints must report to the Domain Commander.

In 2017, the amended National Registration Act empowered ICA officers to investigate and enforce offences under said Act.

On 30 March 2017, it was announced that Woodlands Town Centre would be absorbed by the new Woodlands Checkpoint extension.

On 1 April 2018, the amended Immigration Act took effect. ICA officers would now perform roles as first responders. The amendment gave immigration officers the legal powers of police officers in relation to offences committed in the vicinity of checkpoints.

On 3 September 2018, Marvin Sim became the Commissioner of ICA. He was previously senior director of Joint Operations Group at MHA and deputy director at CNB.

On 10 May 2019 during its Work Plan Seminar, ICA announced its new crest, mission and vision. The organisation's values remain unchanged.

On 25 November 2019, ICA took over the investigation of offences under the National Registration Act and National Registration Regulations. These offences were previously investigated by the SPF.

==== COVID-19 pandemic ====
In January 2020, ICA became the first line of defence against the COVID-19 pandemic. The Singapore government immediately started border health control procedures, announcing travel bans on foreign visitors arriving from affected areas and temperature screening at checkpoints. Incoming travellers were issued health advisories. Stay-Home Notices (SHN) and other enhanced measures were later added to contain the outbreak.

Counter services in the ICA Building became strictly for selected services that cannot be done or completed online or by e-appointment only. All applications are to be done online. Members of the public should use the e-Services at the ICA Building. If you have made the application earlier and the process requires you to proceed to the building itself for physical collection (e.g. NRIC and passports), you will have to book the appointment via the e-Appointment service.

Stay-Home Notices were issued by ICA to travellers who were deemed to be "at-risk", such as those returning from affected areas. Such travellers were not allowed to leave their place of stay for a 14-day period, starting from the day of arrival. A Singaporean who was served his stay-home notice on arrival back into Singapore, posted on social media a photo of him eating bak kut teh, a meat soup dish in Singapore, on the same day he arrived in Singapore. He was later convicted of breaching his stay-home notice.

Starting from 23 March 2020, no foreign visitors were allowed transit or entry into Singapore.

From 27 March 2020, Stay-Home Notices were issued by email.

On 28 March 2020, entry requirements were extended to all Long Term Pass holders. They would have to obtain an Approval Letter of Entry before travelling to Singapore.

On 10 April 2020, it was announced that a cluster of COVID-19 cases at the ICA building at Kallang Road, where 3 officers had tested positive for the coronavirus. The building was closed for a day on 11 April for disinfection purposes.

On 1 April 2022, the Causeway fully reopened at midnight, signalling the return to normalcy since Malaysia closed the land border with Singapore on March 18, 2020.

On 13 February 2023, Singapore reverted to DORSCON Green, which meant the cessation of all COVID-19 related border measures. However, returning travellers from air and sea checkpoints were still required to complete a health declaration form.

== Checkpoints ==
Below is a list of Singapore's ports of entries for persons, conveyances and goods. All of them fall under the purview of the ICA. Only two, Tuas and Woodlands Checkpoints are fully owned by ICA.

=== Land Domain ===
- Tuas Command
- Woodlands Command
  - Woodlands Train Checkpoint (WTCP)
  - Woodlands Checkpoint (NWC)
  - Old Woodlands Checkpoint (OWC)

Woodlands Command is the world's busiest land checkpoint, clearing more than 100 million travellers every year. It consists of Woodlands Checkpoint, WTCP, Old Woodlands Checkpoint and Woodlands Mini-checkpoint.

The Woodlands Mini-checkpoint consists of ten immigration counters used to clear motorcycles during the morning peak period.

The Old Woodlands Checkpoint is open to cars, motorcycles and lorries carrying cargo depending on the traffic situation. It was first re-gazetted as an immigration depot in 2008 to clear departing lorries. in 2009, it was expanded to be able to clear motorcycles and arriving lorries. In 2013, the installation of car booths enabled OWC to clear all forms of arriving traffic.

=== Air Domain ===
- Airport Command
  - Singapore Changi Airport
  - Seletar Airport
- Air Cargo Command
  - Airport Logistics Park of Singapore
  - Changi Airfreight Centre
  - Parcel Post Section

=== Sea Domain ===
- Coastal Command
  - Singapore Cruise Centre
  - Marina Bay Cruise Centre Singapore
  - Tanah Merah Ferry Terminal
  - Changi Ferry Terminal
  - Changi Point Ferry Terminal
  - Jurong Fishery Port
  - Marina South Pier
  - West Coast Pier

ICA's Coastal Command is the largest command in ICA in terms of the number of checkpoints, stretching from the East to the West of the country.

- Ports Command
  - Port of Singapore
  - Sembawang Port
  - Jurong Port
  - Keppel Distripark
  - Ports Command HQ

== Personnel ==
=== Officers ===
Immigration officers in ICA are considered public servants by law and are part of the Singapore Civil Service.

Since the implementation of the Home Affairs Services (HAS) (ICA) Unified scheme, new officers join as Direct-Entry Sergeants and Direct-Entry Inspectors. Direct-Entry Sergeants need minimally 5 O'level passes and they can range from ITE graduates to polytechnic diploma holders. Direct-Entry Inspectors must be graduates from a university accredited by its home country. Newly trained Sergeants will become Primary Screening Officers, while Inspectors will become Team Leaders in their foundation posting. Regardless, all new officers will be posted to Tuas, Woodlands or Coastal Command.

There is a separate scheme for civilian officers in ICA. These officers, who are known as "Management Executives" are typically deployed to ICA's services centres and do not perform border security functions at the checkpoints. ICA also employs temporary staff and administrative assistants to provide customer service support.

=== Training ===
All ICA direct-entry Sergeants and Inspectors must attend and pass the ICA Basic Course which is held regularly at the Home Team Academy. The Basic Course includes lessons on document examination, basic unarmed combat and basic firearms training. The Basic Course lasts twenty three weeks for Direct-Entry Inspectors and sixteen weeks for Direct-Entry Sergeants. Both courses are non-residential, are fully paid-for the duration of the courses and trainees will receive their substantive rank pay as well. In return, officers have to serve bonds of one to two years after graduation. Direct-Entry Sergeants also receive sign-on bonuses and retention pay-outs. To remain in service, officers will have to pass law examinations and a firearms shooting test.

Advanced courses are also conducted by ICA's Training Command. Direct Entry Sergeants are typically trained into specialists in different fields such as profiling, cargo examination and firearms shooting. Senior officers will first be exposed to ICA's ground operations before being sent to enforcement, service or staff units. Overseas postings at Singapore's consulates are also available. Furthermore, suitable officers at any level below that of Inspector may also secure scholarships and promotion into the rank of senior officers as part of the new unified scheme.

Specialised courses are conducted by different units in ICA, such as the Court Etiquette, Protocol and Procedures course conducted by ICA's Enforcement Division.

=== Ranks ===
Before the merger, both SIR and CED had their own distinct rank progression. However, they were similar in that there was a separate scheme for Senior and Junior officers. This continued to be the case post-merger until 2017.

Since 2017, ICA officer ranks have fallen under the HAS (ICA) Unified scheme. All Immigration Officers are placed under this scheme regardless of education level.

As part of the unified scheme, the ranks of Corporal and Staff Sergeant were collapsed into a single Sergeant rank with numerical increments. The ranks of Senior Checkpoint Inspector were removed and suitable Checkpoint Inspectors would be promoted to Inspectors instead. A new rank, Deputy Assistant Commissioner was added to provide more opportunities for officers at the middle management level.

At present, ranks in the ICA are similar to those in the Singapore Police Force with some changes in insignia and naming (see table below).

Rank	Abbreviation	Rank Insignia
Sergeant 1	SGT(1)	
Sergeant 2	SGT(2)	
Sergeant 3	SGT(3)	
Checkpoint Inspector (1)	CI (1)	
Checkpoint Inspector (2)	CI (2)	
Inspector	INSP	
Assistant Superintendent	ASP	
Deputy Superintendent	DSP	
Superintendent	SUPT	
Deputy Assistant Commissioner	DAC	
Assistant Commissioner	AC	
Senior Assistant Commissioner	SAC	
Deputy Commissioner of ICA	-	
Commissioner of ICA	-	

=== Awards and decorations ===
The Long Service medals were introduced in 2013 to recognise the dedication and performance of senior ICA officers.

==== Medals ====
- Pingat Kepujian (Commendation Medal) - The medal may be awarded to any of the following persons who has distinguished himself through commendable performance and conduct, or significant efficiency, competence and devotion to duty.
- Pingat Berkebolehan (Efficiency Medal) - The medal may be awarded to any of the following persons for exceptional efficiency or exceptional devotion to duty or for work of special significance.
- Pingat Bakti Setia (Long Service Award) - The medal may be awarded to any person who has completed 25 years continuous service in the service of the government or associated agencies.
- Good Service Medal
- Long Service and Good Conduct Medal (10 Years)

Long Service and Good Conduct Medal (10 Years) with 2 clasps

A Clasp may be awarded to a recipient of the 10 Years Medal on his completion of at least 15 years of continuous and unbroken qualifying service and a second Clasp on his completion of at least 20 years of continuous and unbroken qualifying service.

- Long Service and Good Conduct Medal (30 Years)
- Long Service and Good Conduct Medal (35 Years)
  - A Clasp may be awarded to a recipient of the 35 Years Medal on his completion of at least 40 years of continuous and unbroken qualifying service. The ICA also gives a Special Appreciation Award (SAA) for retired officers who are re-employed to service for every five years.

== Equipment ==
=== Firearms ===
Under Section 38A of the Immigration Act, all immigration officers shall be issued arms and ammunition as necessary. In practice, only qualified officers serving in protective security related roles are issued firearms.

The service firearm is the 5-shot Taurus Model 85 revolver. Other equipment include handcuffs, flexicuffs and expandable batons.

=== Uniform ===
Since 2003, the uniform has not changed from its current Navy Blue design which was chosen to establish ICA as a member of the Home Team.

The uniform comes in different designs to suit the varied operating environments of ICA. The basic field uniform consists of a short-sleeved dress shirt and pants with a dress or duty belt as appropriate. This uniform can be most often seen in the Land and Sea checkpoints. Inspectors and above typically wear a bush jacket (for men) or a tunic (for women). A dress skirt is also available for female officers. Air Domain officers working at Changi Airport wear two-piece suits with ties to conform with airport guidelines, while sea-going clearance team officers wear long-sleeve coastal uniforms that resemble the SAF's Number 4 uniform. Cargo examination officers are issued polo shirts due to their warm operational environment.

A unique ICC domain insignia was created in 2016 for each domain of the ICC, which symbolizes a shared identity for all HT officers working in that domain.

=== Technology ===
ICA integrates information technology to streamline the entry and exit procedure at checkpoints. Singapore citizens, permanent residents and other registered travelers can use automated lanes called enhanced-Immigration Automated Clearance System (eIACS). The Biometric Identification of Motorbikers (BIKES) System at ICA's land checkpoints can be used by residents and work pass holders entering and leaving Singapore by motorcycles.

In 2007, the Central Identification and Registration Information System (CIRIS) was introduced. CIRIS was a digital database which replaced the National Identification Databank/Passport and Employment (NID/PEM) System that was in use.

In 2018, the ICA released the MyICA app which allowed citizens to process multiple transactions in a single payment.

At ICA's 2019 Workplan Seminar, the New Clearance Concept was introduced. Foreign visitors would fill in an electronic disembarkation card or e-DE card. They would be then allowed to use ICA's automated immigration gates upon arrival. Singaporeans will no longer have to present their passports or their thumbprints for immigration clearance at the automated gates. Instead, facial recognition technology will be utilised.

In 2020, ICA announced the cessation of physical embarkation cards. Arriving travellers would be directed to use the SG Arrival Card, an electronic embarkation card with apps in Google Play and Apple's App Store. In view of the COVID-19 pandemic, all travellers entering Singapore from 27 March 2020 were to fill in electronic health declaration cards integrated into the SG Arrival Card website.

==== Biometric verification ====
ICA has progressively implemented the use of biometric verification to improve security at its checkpoints. ICA employs the use of biometry to find persons of interests and has deployed a suitcase sized facial recognition system to different checkpoints

In 1997, ICA implemented the Checkpoint Access Cards. which used fingerprint data to facilitate entry. The system was called Immigration Automated Clearance System or IACS. Later in 2006, the system was upgraded to the Enhanced Automated Immigration Clearance System (EIACS).

In 2005, the Biometric Database for Immigration Clearance (BDIC) was introduced. This was a biometric database that contained all the biometric records of immigration offenders and police criminal records. This was used to supplement text-based blacklist screening and prevented undesirable travellers from entering Singapore with a fraudulent passport.

In October 2006, ICA began issuing biometric passports to Singapore citizens.

In October 2017, ICA started issuance of new biometric passports with additional security features. This marked the second series of biometrics passports issued by Singapore. Singapore citizens and Permanent Residents have their iris bio-data registered as well.

In 2016, ICA began the biometric registering and verification of travelers using the Bioscreen system. In 2019, ICA announced the launch of iris scanning and facial recognition trials. This would allow passport-less travel for its citizens and permanent residents. Passport-less clearance began in 2024.

At Changi Airport's Terminal 4, there are Automated Immigration Gates (AIGs) which allow foreigners one-time use of automated immigration clearance.
