= Singapore Customs =

Government agency

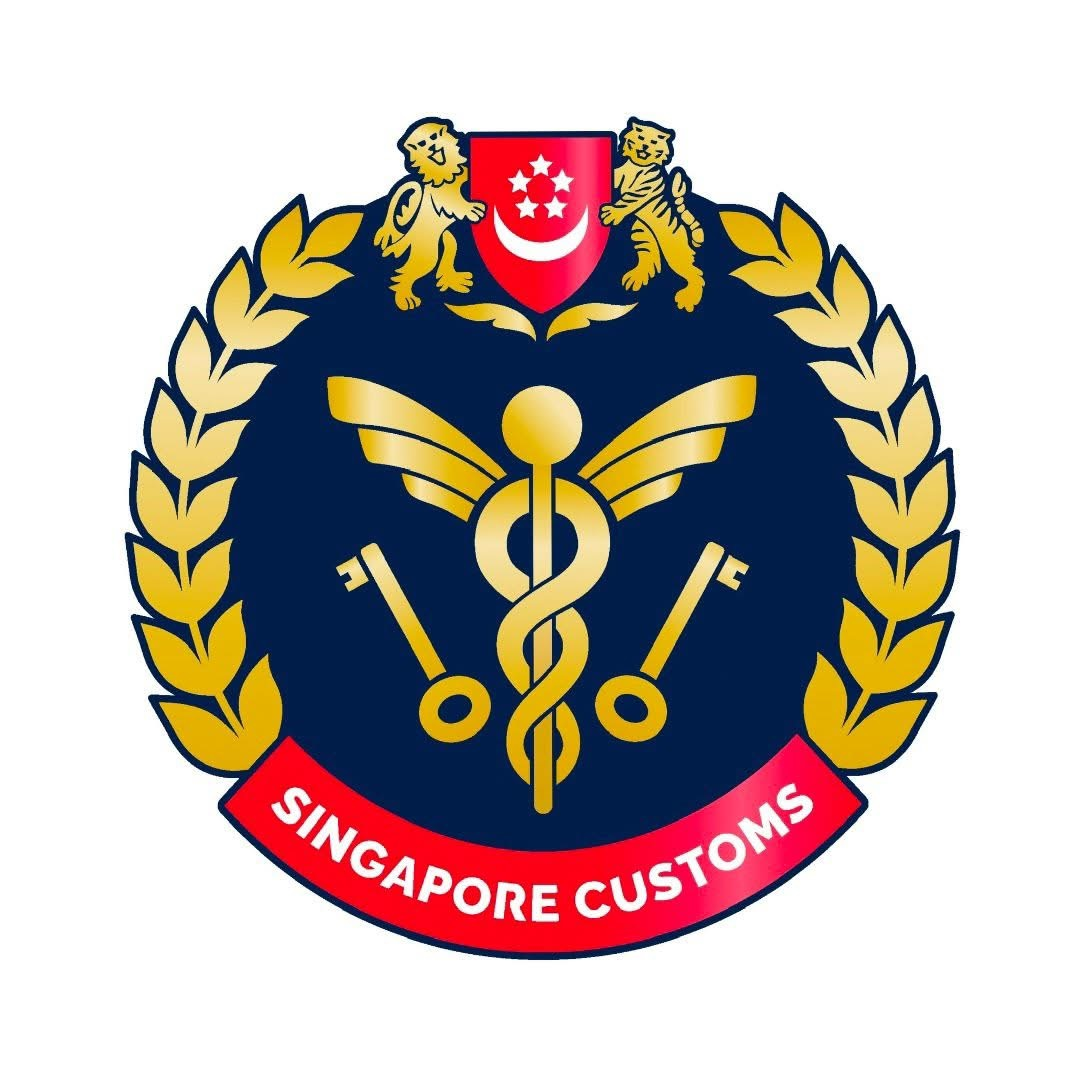

Agency overview
- Formed: 1 April 2003; 23 years ago
- Preceding agency: Department of Customs and Excise (CED)

Jurisdictional structure
- Operations jurisdiction: Singapore
- Specialist jurisdiction: Customs, excise, gambling

Operational structure
- Headquarters: 55 Newton Road, Revenue House, Singapore 307987
- Elected officer responsible: Lawrence Wong, Minister of Finance
- Agency executive: Tan Hung Hooi, Director-General of Customs
- Parent agency: Ministry of Finance

Website
- www.customs.gov.sg

The Singapore Customs is a department under the Ministry of Finance of the Government of Singapore. Singapore Customs was reconstituted on 1 April 2003, after the Customs and Excise Department and the Trade Facilitation Division and Statistics Audit Unit of International Enterprise Singapore (IE Singapore) were merged. The border function's at the land, air and sea checkpoints were also simultaneously transferred to Immigration and Checkpoints Authority (ICA). Singapore Customs serves as the lead agency for trade facilitation and revenue enforcement. It is also responsible for implementing customs and trade-related enforcement measures, including those pertaining to Free Trade Agreements and strategic goods.

The headquarters is located in Revenue House along Newton Road, Novena.

== Goods and Services Tax (GST) Refund for Tourists ==
The Tourist Refund Scheme (TRS) is administered by Singapore Customs on behalf of the Inland Revenue Authority of Singapore (IRAS). The scheme allows tourists to claim a refund of the Goods and Services Tax (GST) paid on goods purchased from participating retailers if the goods are brought out of Singapore via Changi International Airport or Seletar Airport.

== History ==
The Customs Department was founded when Singapore was the British Empire's Straits Settlements and later Crown Colony. Established in 1910 under the name Government Monopolies Department, Customs is one of the oldest tax-collecting organisations in modern Singapore to increase the country's state coffers to help fund national programmes. Revenue collection began in December 1909 when the first import duty was imposed on hard liquors. In 1916, the tariff was extended to include tobacco and cigarettes. The collection of duty on petroleum was introduced in 1934. Motor vehicles are also subject to tax and excise duties. Effective 1 January 2012, compressed natural gas (CNG) for motor vehicles is subject to tax and excise duty.

The department has gone through many transitions, mergers, and re-organizations in the last century under the government of Singapore. The department's responsibilities in securing Singapore's future are affected by worldwide globalization, market forces and changes in laws, tariffs, trading and traveling trends.

On 1 April 2003, the department was re-constituted as Singapore Customs - a government agency transferred to the Ministry of Finance of Singapore - providing essential services for revenue collection and enforcement, trade documentation, trade facilitation, and security functions as Singapore’s single authority on customs and trade regulatory matters.

On 15 November 2019, the new Customs Operations Command building was officially opened at Bulim Drive off Jalan Bahar in Jurong West. This will allow for intelligence, investigation and compliance-related functions to come under the command.

On 1 January 2025, Singapore Customs unveiled a refreshed logo.

== Primary roles and functions ==
Singapore Customs' primary roles and functions are:

- collection of customs revenue;
- protection of customs revenue by preventing the evasion of duties and taxes;
- provision of one-stop service for trade and customs matters, including issuance of permits, licenses and Certificates of Origin, and provision of classification and valuation advice;
- facilitation of trade through simplification of customs procedures and administration of tax break schemes;
- enforcement of trade requirements under the various Free Trade Agreements (FTAs);
- regulation of trade in strategic goods and strategic goods technology; and
- enforcement against the illegal buying and selling of all types of duty-unpaid tobacco and liquors.

== Organisational structure ==
Singapore Customs is headed by a Director-General, who is supported by a Deputy Director-General, four Senior Assistant Directors-General, three Assistant Directors-General, two Directors (Data Division and Networked Trade Platform Office), a Chief Human Resource Officer and a Chief Information Technology Officer.

The functions of Singapore Customs are carried out by the following divisions and directorates:

- Checkpoints Division
- Compliance Division
- Data Division
- Human Resource Directorate
- Information Technology Directorate
- Intelligence & Investigation Division
- Ops-Tech & Management Division
- Planning, Communication & International Division
- Trade Division
- Digital Services

Each branch within a division is typically headed by a Chief Superintendent of Customs or the non-uniformed equivalent.

The Internal Audit Branch reports directly to the Director-General of Customs.

Senior Management
Appointment	Rank	Abbreviation	Name
Director-General (Customs)	Director-General	DG	Tan Hung Hooi
Deputy Director-General (Policy & Facilitation)	Deputy Director-General	DDG (P&F)	Lim Teck Leong
Chief Human Resource Officer	Senior Assistant Director-General	CHRO	Karen Lim Shu Wen
Senior Assistant Director-General (Checkpoints)	Senior Assistant Director-General	SADG (CP)	Sung Pik Wan
Senior Assistant Director-General (Compliance)	Senior Assistant Director-General	SADG (C)	Winston Tay Wee Hua
Senior Assistant Director-General (Ops-Tech & Management)	Senior Assistant Director-General	SADG (OTM)	Teh Thiam Siong
Senior Assistant Director-General (Intelligence & Investigation)	Senior Assistant Director-General	SADG (I&I)	Lee Boon Chong
Assistant Director-General (Trade)	Assistant Director-General	ADG (T)	Raine Ng
Assistant Director-General (Digital Services)	Assistant Director-General	ADG (DS)	Raine Ng
Assistant Director-General (Planning, Communication & International)	Assistant Director-General	ADG (PCI)	Teo Angie
Assistant Director-General (Intelligence & Investigation)	Assistant Director-General	ADG (I&I)	Goh Hoon Lip
Chief Information Officer	N.A.	CIO	Cheryl Sim Hwee Leng
Director, Data Division	N.A.	D(Data)	Chong Soo Yuen

== Rank structure ==
The rank structure of Singapore Customs is as such, in order of ascending seniority:

Rank	Abbreviation	Rank Insignia
Higher Customs Officer II	HCO II	
Higher Customs Officer I	HCO I	
Senior Customs Officer	SCO	
Chief Customs Officer	CCO	
Superintendent of Customs	SC	
Higher Superintendent of Customs	HSC	
Senior Superintendent of Customs	SSC	
Deputy Chief Superintendent of Customs	DCSC	
Chief Superintendent of Customs; Senior Chief Superintendent of Customs	CSC; SCSC	
Assistant Director-General of Customs	ADG	
Senior Assistant Director-General of Customs	SADG	
Deputy Director-General of Customs	DDG	
Director-General of Customs	DG	

== See also ==
- Immigration and Checkpoints Authority
- Inland Revenue Authority of Singapore
- Ministry of Finance (Singapore)
