= Departure card =

Immigration document

A departure card, also known as an outgoing passenger card or embarkation card, is a legal document used by immigration authorities to provide passenger identification and an effective record of a person’s departure from certain countries. It also serves as a declaration in relation to health and character requirements for non-citizens entering a particular country. The departure card can come attached with its corresponding arrival card with the former being retained in the passport after passport control clearance. The card is then surrendered to passport control upon departure.

== Information on the card itself ==
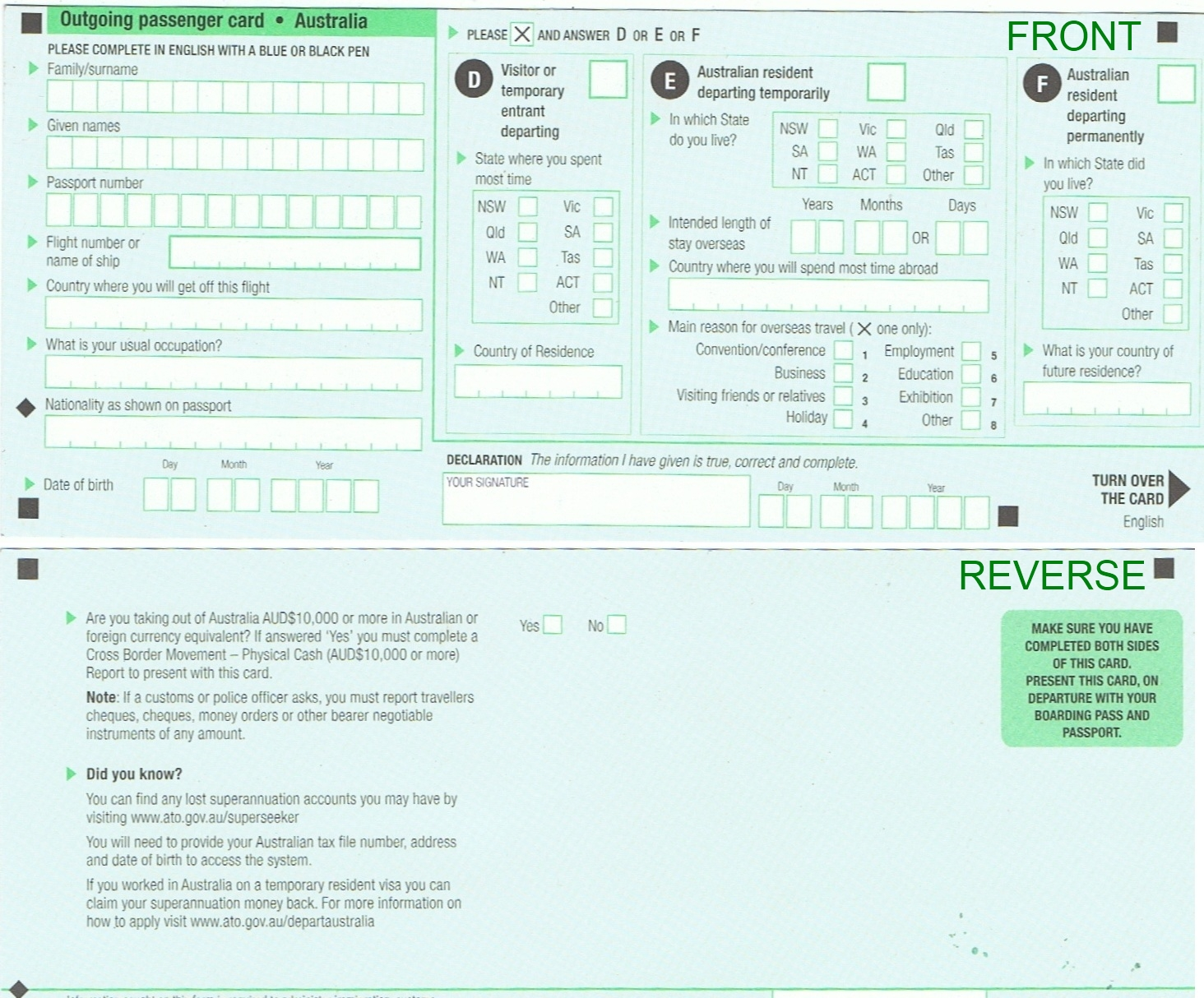
Outgoing Passenger Card from Australia

Typically the information on the departure card includes

- Full name
- Nationality
- Passport number
- Flight number or name of aircraft, ship or vehicle
- Purpose of trip: vacation, education/study, visiting relatives/families, business, diplomatic
- Duration of stay
- Destination (next stop of disembarkation)
- Address in country

Travelers are also required to sign, date and declare the information is true, correct and complete.

Passengers on international flights required to fill in departure cards need a valid boarding pass and passport to proceed through immigration checkpoints.

== Retirement, exemption and integration with arrival card ==
ASEAN

Depending on the jurisdiction, an immigrant will be issued a card that both has an arrival and departure portion where both share a common serial/control number to facilitate identification. The traveller is usually required to retain the latter in his passport and use that same card to exit the country. Some jurisdictions that have this system are Hong Kong, Macau, Malaysia, Singapore, Indonesia, USA, Brazil and Thailand. Hong Kong and Macau have the departure portion as a carbon copy of the landing card but the flight number, next destination and signature are left blank while the latter six have a shorter portion for departure cards which require less information, but they are joined together as with others to enable immigration officers to tear off one portion as with most ASEAN nations.

For a short time between 2009 and 2010, the Philippines also had a card with portions pertaining to arrival and departure. All passengers, regardless of nationality, are required to fill out the arrival portion and immigrants were required to retain the departure portion. Filipino citizens on the other hand would fill out a separate departure card on their next flight leaving the Philippines. Later in 2011, the Bureau of Immigration reverted to the older cards. In 2014, the Bureau of Immigration switched to the new color-coded cards, with the arrival card being blue, and the departure card being red. In 2018, the looks of the card, along with the color-coding was changed, with the arrival card being red, and the departure card being green. Since 2014, the Bureau of Immigration only required Filipino citizens to complete departure cards, while foreigners/visitors to only complete arrival cards.

From September 16, 2017, departure/arrival cards are no longer required for Thais to leave/enter Thailand through immigration check-points.

Australia

Departure cards were completely retired across Australia on 1 July 2017 marking the end of a procedure that has been in place for aircraft and ship departures since the 1960s. Before that in March 2015 Brisbane Airport offer its passengers to use an app to print departure cards at Departure Card Kiosks within its international terminal. Over the years the cards were refined (made smaller) and used different designs. Up until the 2000s departure cards were also stamped with an immigration departure date and port stamp along with the travellers passport.

India

From July 2017, Indians flying out of India are exempted from filling the departure card. The exemption is only applicable for travel through airports only.

USA

In the United States, the most common example of this is the Form I-94. Prior to its digitization in 2013, the departure portion of a paper I-94 form must be retained by the passenger at all times during their stay (passport control officers would usually staple this portion to the passport). As the US is one of the few countries that doesn't have a formal passport control for departing passengers, visitors would need to return the card through the staff at the departing carrier's check-in counter at the airport (if leaving by air) or to border officers (if leaving by land). After its digitalization in 2013, the paper I-94 is phased out for all air and sea arrivals, while at the land border officers continue to issue paper I-94 which is now linked to the database.

== See also ==
- Arrival card
- Boarding pass
- Passport
- Visa
