= St. Paul's College, Hong Kong =

Boys' school in Hong Kong, established in 1851

Coordinates: 22°17′04″N 114°08′20″E

- 聖保羅書院 (Chinese)
- College Badge of St. Paul's College

Location
- 69 Bonham Road, Hong Kong; 777 Victoria Road, Hong Kong

Information
- Type: DSS, Day
- Motto: Timor Domini Principium Sapientiae (Latin) 寅畏上主是為智之本 (Chinese) (The fear of the Lord is the beginning of wisdom)
- Denomination: Anglican
- Established: 1851; 175 years ago
- Founder: Rev. Vincent John Stanton
- Principal: Mak Chi Ho Michael
- Supervisor: Pong Yuen Sun, Louis
- Grades: Secondary 1 – Secondary 6
- Gender: Boys
- Enrolment: around 1200 (Secondary) around 600 (Primary)
- Language: English
- Campus type: Urban
- Houses: Pine, Rosewood, Banyan, Ginkgo, Oak, Yew (Arranged in house competition results)
- Publication: Wayfarer (弘道, school magazine); Scope (文苑, school newspaper)
- Pupils: Paulines
- Website: spc.edu.hk

St. Paul's College, Hong Kong
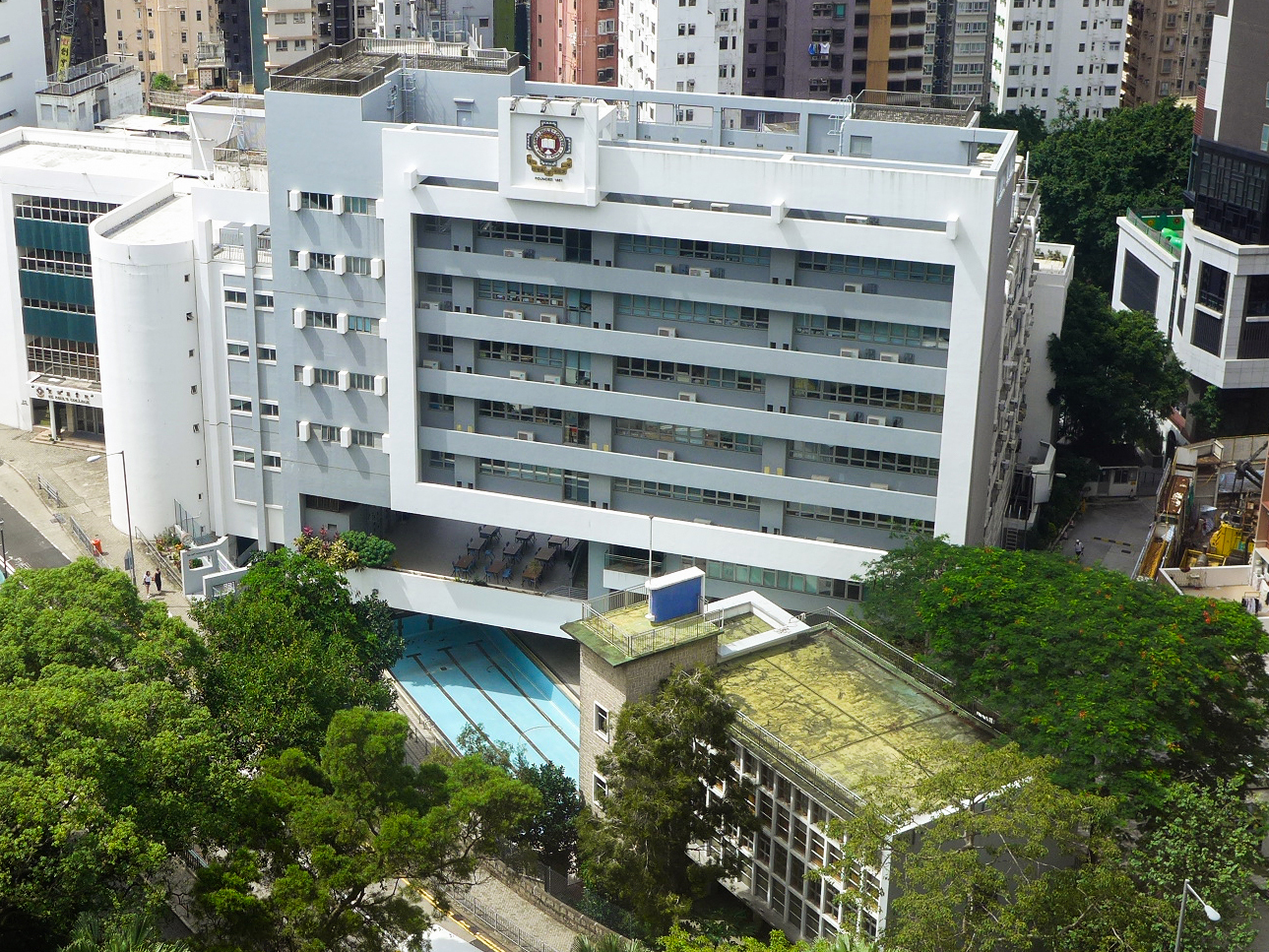
- St. Paul's College campus, as seen from HKU (2017).

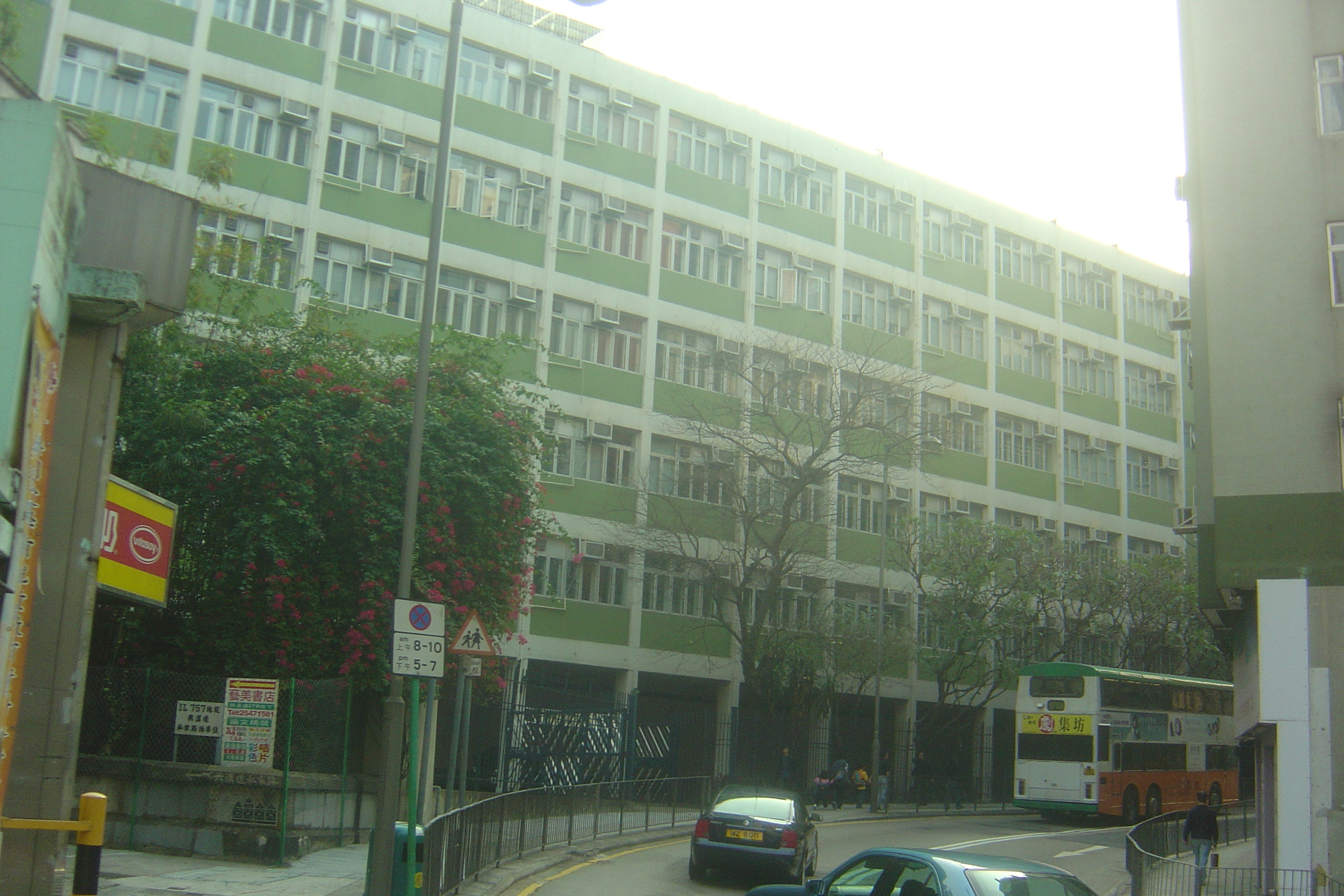
- Exterior of the North Wing (Classroom Block)
- Traditional Chinese: 聖保羅書院
- Simplified Chinese: 圣保罗书院
Transcriptions
Standard Mandarin
- Hanyu Pinyin: Shèngbǎoluó Shūyuàn
- Wade–Giles: Shengpaolo Shuyüan
- Yale Romanization: Shèngbǎulwó Shūywàn
- IPA: [ʂə̂ŋ pàʊlwǒ ʂúɥɛ̂n]
Yue: Cantonese
- Yale Romanization: Sing bóu lòh syù yún
- Jyutping: Sing3 bou2 lo4 Syu1 jyun2
- IPA: [sīːŋ.pǒulȍ ɕŷːjy̌ːn]

St. Paul's College (SPC; Chinese: 聖保羅書院) is an Anglican day school for boys in Hong Kong. First opened in 1851 with only one tutor and nine pupils, it is the oldest continuously operated school in Hong Kong. Today, it has more than 1,200 pupils in the secondary section and nearly 600 pupils in the primary section.

St. Paul's comprises an all-boys primary school section (Primary 1–6) and secondary section (Forms 1–6). The secondary school campus is situated in the Mid-Levels area, part of Hong Kong Island's Western District, whilst the primary school operates in a dedicated campus at Pok Fu Lam in the Island's Southern District.

The College Council enjoys a special status in Hong Kong, in that it is a statutory body incorporated by a local ordinance, the St. Paul's College Council Incorporation Ordinance (Cap 1102, Laws of Hong Kong). The aim of the college is to "provide a liberal education to Chinese youths in the English language upon Christian principles.".

== History ==
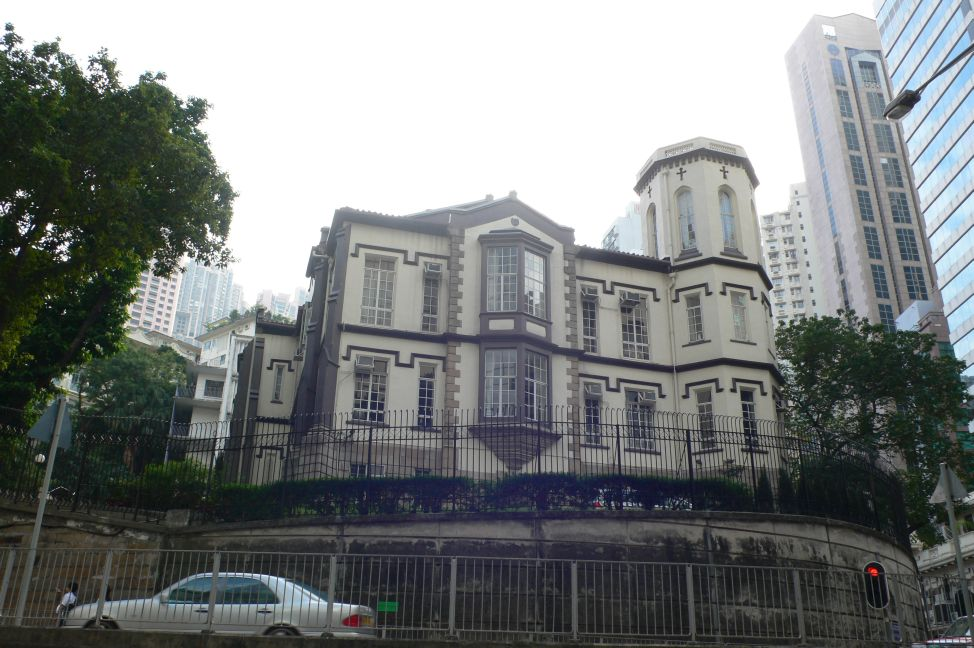
The old campus, now called Bishop's House, Glenealy

=== Establishment ===
St. Paul's College was one of the earliest Anglo-Chinese schools. Its founder, Rev. Vincent John Stanton, was the first colonial chaplain of the former Colony of Hong Kong, appointed in 1843. In 1841, Rev. Stanton raised funds in England to start an Anglo-Chinese school in Hong Kong.

The original purpose of founding the Church of England Anglo-Chinese School in Hong Kong was to train "a body of native clergy and Christian teachers for the propagation of the Gospel in China...[and] to aid in the diffusion of Christian principles among the Chinese". Thus, the school opened for the purpose of teaching English to Chinese boys in 1849. St. Paul's College was officially founded in 1851, located at Glenealy in what is today the Central District.

The school opened with James Summers as headmaster, Rev. Edward T. R. Moncrieff as the tutor and nine boys. The number of students soon swelled to 33. Rev. Moncrieff, the school's only tutor at the time, travelled to India, where he was killed in 1857 in the Indian Mutiny.

The college was suspended from 1857 to 1861. It reopened under sinologist John Fryer and was led by him for the ensuing two years.

Under the leadership of Bishop John Burdon, St. Paul's became a school mainly for English-speaking boys from 1873 to 1878. During this time, St. Paul's College and St. Joseph's College competed in the earliest inter-school football matches ever played in the colony. The college again became an Anglo-Chinese school under the headmastership of A. T. Fryer in 1878. The college was suspended in 1899, and the building was used as a training school for Chinese Catechists under the leadership of Rev. P. A. Bunbury.

=== Early 20th century ===
The Church Missionary Society took over the school building, and St. Paul's College reopened with Rev. A.D. Stewart as headmaster in 1908. Rev. Stewart's brother Col. E. G. Stewart highlighted the primitive facilities of the school at this time in his article about St. Paul's history. "Some of us can remember the old south wing - two enormous classrooms on the first floor and one on the ground floor - the rest of the space taken up with wide verandas and staircases, the whole constructed of ancient and somewhat worm-eaten wood, which must have caused a headache to the insurance company; the bad lighting and amazing discomforts which would not be tolerated by modern schoolboys."

During this time, the enrolment soared to 300 and extensions became necessary. In 1911, the Wu Ting Fang Hall and St. Paul's Church were erected. In 1914, St. Paul's Girls' College (renamed St. Paul's Co-educational College in the late 1940s) was founded by Kathleen Stewart (sister to Rev. A.D. Stewart and wife of Rev. Ernest Martin. Headmaster Rev. A.D. Stewart retired and his brother Colonel E. G. Stewart took charge in 1930.

=== Japanese occupation ===
In December 1941, the school closed abruptly when Japan invaded Hong Kong in the Pacific War. Col. Stewart, along with some school staff and students, risked their lives for the defence of the colony. After World War II, Colonel Stewart was awarded Distinguished Service Order (DSO) and the Order of the British Empire (OBE) honours in 1948. He was appointed Royal Hong Kong Regiment, honorary colonel.

=== Post-wars years and the Bonham Road era ===
After the Japanese occupation of Hong Kong, the school was briefly merged with St. Paul's Girls' College, and renamed St. Paul's Co-educational College. St. Paul's College regained its independence in 1949 when its campus on Bonham Road was completed. St. Paul's Co-educational College remained co-educational. Rev. G.L. Speak was appointed principal in 1959.

During the Hong Kong 1967 leftist riots, Form 6 pupil Tsang Tak-sing was expelled from the school and prosecuted for distributing leaflets promoting Communism and public order crime. Tsang was sentenced to two years in prison. He later went on to become a deputy in the National People's Congress of Communist China, a member of the Central Policy Unit and, on 1 July 2007, the Secretary for Home Affairs in the Hong Kong Government. Timothy Ha Wing-ho was appointed principal in 1969.

St. Paul's College bloomed quickly in the late 20th century. In 1979, the opening of St. Paul's College Alumni Association Tse Yu Chuen Swimming Pool marked the completion of one of the greatest building projects of the decade. Its construction was made possible by funding from parents, older boys and the Alumni Association.

In 1992, St. Paul's College was the first aided school to opt for the Direct Subsidy Scheme (DSS). However, the scheme was eventually suspended when the government policy changed. Under DSS, the school would have been given maximum freedom with regard to curriculum, school fees and entrance requirements.

St. Paul's College Primary School was relocated to Hill Road in 1993, in premises which formerly housed a secondary school. The vacant block at Bonham Road was transformed into a series of special-purpose rooms including an art room, music room, staff room, teaching resource room, computer room and teachers' common room.

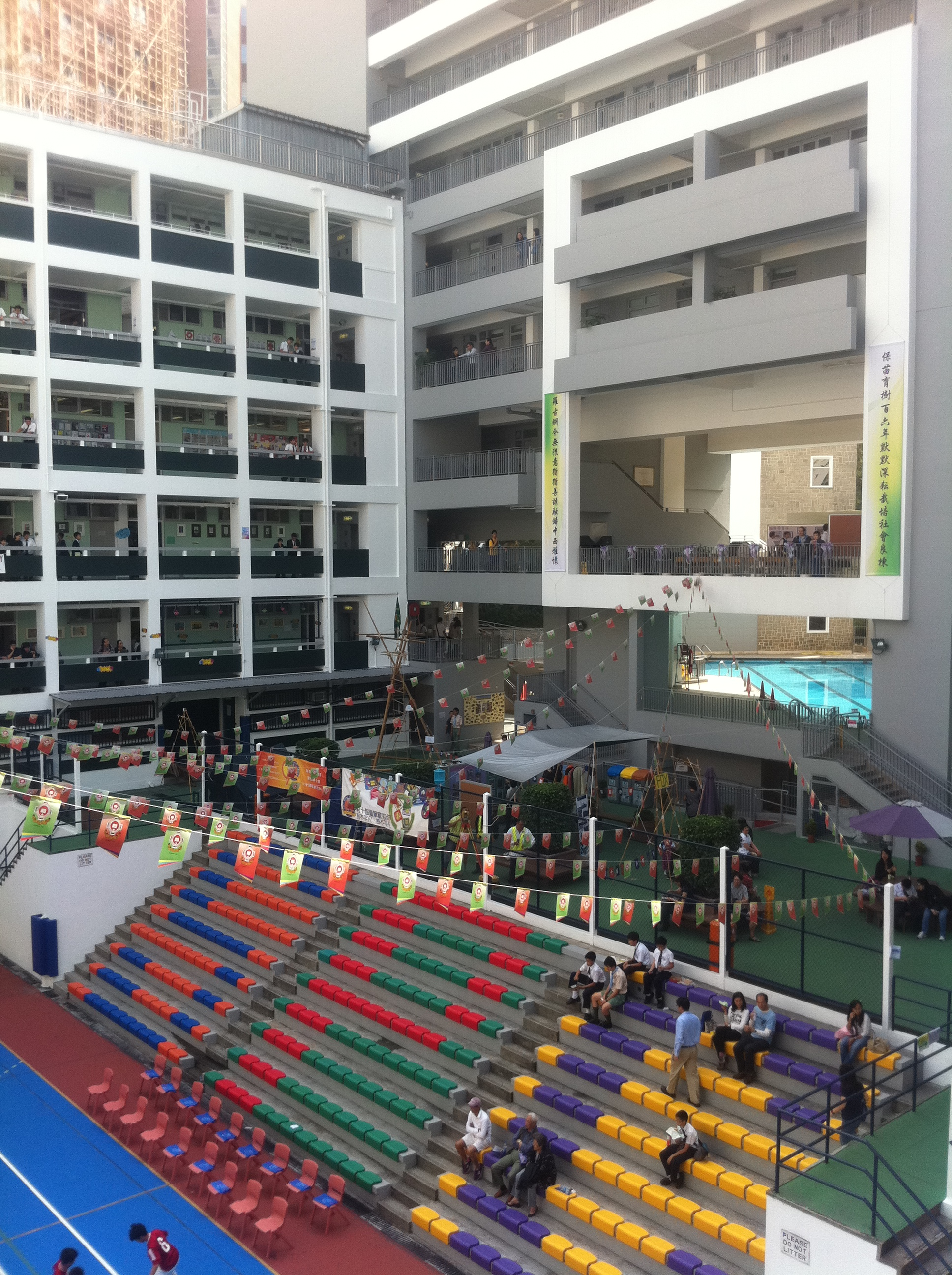
HK Mid-levels Bonham Road 聖保羅書院 Saint Paul's College 開放日 Exhibition Day courtyard Nov-2011

=== 2000–present ===
In 2001, the college celebrated its 150th anniversary. The school elected to join the DSS, under which the school was given more autonomy in the enrolment of students, appointment of teachers and the design of the curriculum.

As the college celebrated its 155th anniversary in 2006, John Richard Kennard was appointed as the 11th principal. Under the DSS, the new South Wing was opened by Archbishop Peter Kwong. The Wong Ming Him Hall underwent renovation in 2008, while the College Hall was renovated in 2010.

A new SPC Primary School campus was built in Pok Fu Lam. The project resulted in the SPC Primary School relocating from its current site on Hill Road. Located at the corner of Victoria Road and Pok Fu Lam Road, the new campus opened in January 2013.

In 2011, the college celebrated its 160th anniversary. The Chapel Choir and Chinese Orchestra visited London in July 2011, and performed at St Paul's Cathedral, Southwark Cathedral and St Martin-in-the-Fields. The 160th Anniversary Concert was held on 26 October 2011 at the Jockey Club Auditorium of the Hong Kong Polytechnic University.

In 2014, Yuen Dick Yan, Dennis, assumed the role of Acting Principal at the college. He was subsequently appointed as Principal on an acting basis in 2015.

== Curriculum ==
=== Class structure ===
There are six classes in each form (Form 1–6). St. Paul's College uses English as the medium of instruction.

The college traditionally followed a system of education similar to Britain. In 2009, the New Senior Secondary (NSS)system was introduced across Hong Kong. This involved moving away from the English model of seven-year secondary schooling to the Chinese model of three years of junior secondary plus three years of senior secondary. The two public examinations HKCEE and HKALE are now replaced by a single public examination called the Hong Kong Diploma of Secondary Education (HKDSE). In addition to the HKDSE, the college also offers the GCE A-Level examinations to provide more opportunities for students.

=== Subjects offered ===
For the first three years of school (Form 1–Form 3), various subjects are introduced to students, including English, Chinese, Putonghua, Mathematics, Integrated Humanities (which is composed of Geography, History, and Citizenship, Economics and Society), Integrated Science, Information and Communication Technology, Religious Studies, Music, Visual Arts and Physical Education. Integrated Science is replaced with Physics, Chemistry and Biology in Form 3.

Under the NSS educational structure, senior form students now choose three elective subjects in which to specialise, together with the compulsory subjects of Chinese, English, Mathematics, Citizenship and Social Development, as well as the school based Common Core, which researches on sustainability and a better city. As of the 2022-23 academic year, Chinese History, Chinese Literature, Biology, Business, Accounting and Financial Studies (BAFS), Chemistry, Economics, Ethics and Religious Studies, Geography, History, Information and Communication Technology (ICT), Music, Physics and Visual Arts (VA) are offered by the college as elective subjects. As for the International Advanced Level (IAL) stream, students study GCE Chinese, English (IELTS), Citizenship and Social Development, Physics, Chemistry, Biology and Mathematics in F.4, and will be able to take either Biology or Further Mathematics in F.5.

The college also runs a bridging course for newly admitted Form 1 students to improve their foundation in English and link their already-possessed knowledge with the new ones. There are also remedial classes in Chinese, English and Mathematics for students requiring additional assistance.

== Extracurricular activities ==
=== The Prefects' Council ===
The Prefects' Council is an independent organisation which is authorised by the principal to help maintain school discipline. A prefect is expected to present himself as a role model to others. Prefects are entitled to wear the prefects' tie and are responsible for delivering Bible readings at the school morning assembly. The prefect's main duties include maintaining discipline at the school and promoting harmony among Paulines. The Prefects' Council runs a committee system under the direction of the head prefect and two second head prefects. The council is also responsible for co-ordinating all functions held by the school and students' association upon request. Prefects have the right to issue warning sheets according to the seriousness of the offence. Outstanding Prefects are chosen each year based on their general routine and performance of external duties.

=== Students' Association ===
The logo of the Students' Association

The St. Paul's College Students' Association (abbreviated as SA) is the students' union body of the college. It is the main body which conducts matters concerning students' welfare and communication with the school. The SA is the oldest students' union in all secondary schools in Hong Kong.

The Executive Council (EC) is the decision-making body of the Students' Association. Executive Council committees include:

- Affiliated Clubs Committee (ACC) – helps all clubs in financial need and in other matters such as club registration. There are 53 affiliated clubs under the students' association.
- Audit Committee – monitors the income and expenditure of the Students' Association.
- Human Resources Committee (HR) – responsible for arrangement of the SA officials' duty for daily operation and the association's activities.
- Public Relations Committee (PR) – responsible for liaison with external bodies or schools.
- Welfare Committee – provides welfare services such as sale of tie clips, umbrella rental service, old books and stationery.
- Promotion Committee - coordinates the promotion work of the SA .

The Students' Association is led by the SA president. At the beginning of each school year, an SA presidential election is held. All students vote for a candidate, and the term of office for each president is one school year.

==== Affiliated clubs of the Students' Association ====
The Students’ Association (S.A.) organises a Sponsored Walk each year to raise funds for financing the activities of its 55 affiliated clubs, which are grouped under seven unions: Arts Union, Science Union, Sports Union, Music Union, Recreation Union, Service Union and Christian Union.

The Arts Union and the Science Union organise the Arts Week and the Science Week respectively, with such programmes as book and club exhibitions, and inter-class competitions. In addition, the Science Union participates in the Joint School Science Exhibition during the summer holidays every year.

The school provides many opportunities for students to participate in community services through the service clubs or groups such as the Interact Club, the Community Youth Club, the Junior Police Call, the Youth Red Cross and the Scout Group. Social services include collecting toys and second-hand clothes, participating in fundraising walkathons and flag-selling activities for charitable purposes, organising funfairs for the mentally disabled, and paying visits to the homes for the aged.

The Recreation Union comprises many clubs for students with various interests, including Chess Club, Transport Club, Photography Club and Hong Kong Exploration Club.

=== House system ===
The House System was first introduced in 1975. The college offers students additional opportunities to participate in extracurricular activities, in the form of the House System, which aims at bridging the gap between junior and senior students, and moving the students beyond the limit of class spirit.

Membership of each house comes from all parts of the school so that within each class there are members of six houses, which are designated as Banyan (榕), Ginkgo (銀杏), Oak (橡), Pine (松), Rosewood (紫檀) and Yew (紫杉). The system facilitates inter-house ball games and competitions in the Swimming Gala and the Sports Days. Apart from participating in sports competitions, members of the six houses also show their talents in inter-house music, debating and drama contests.

The colour of each house corresponds with the first letter of the house name.

Each house is led by a house master, and a number of assistant house masters or mistresses. The events at the Annual Sports Day and Swimming Gala are mostly inter-house events, with the exception of a few inter-class events. Most competitions between the houses are sports competitions, while academic ones are rare.

Newly admitted F.1 students are randomly allocated to one of the six houses. House members may purchase and wear house badges on a voluntary basis.

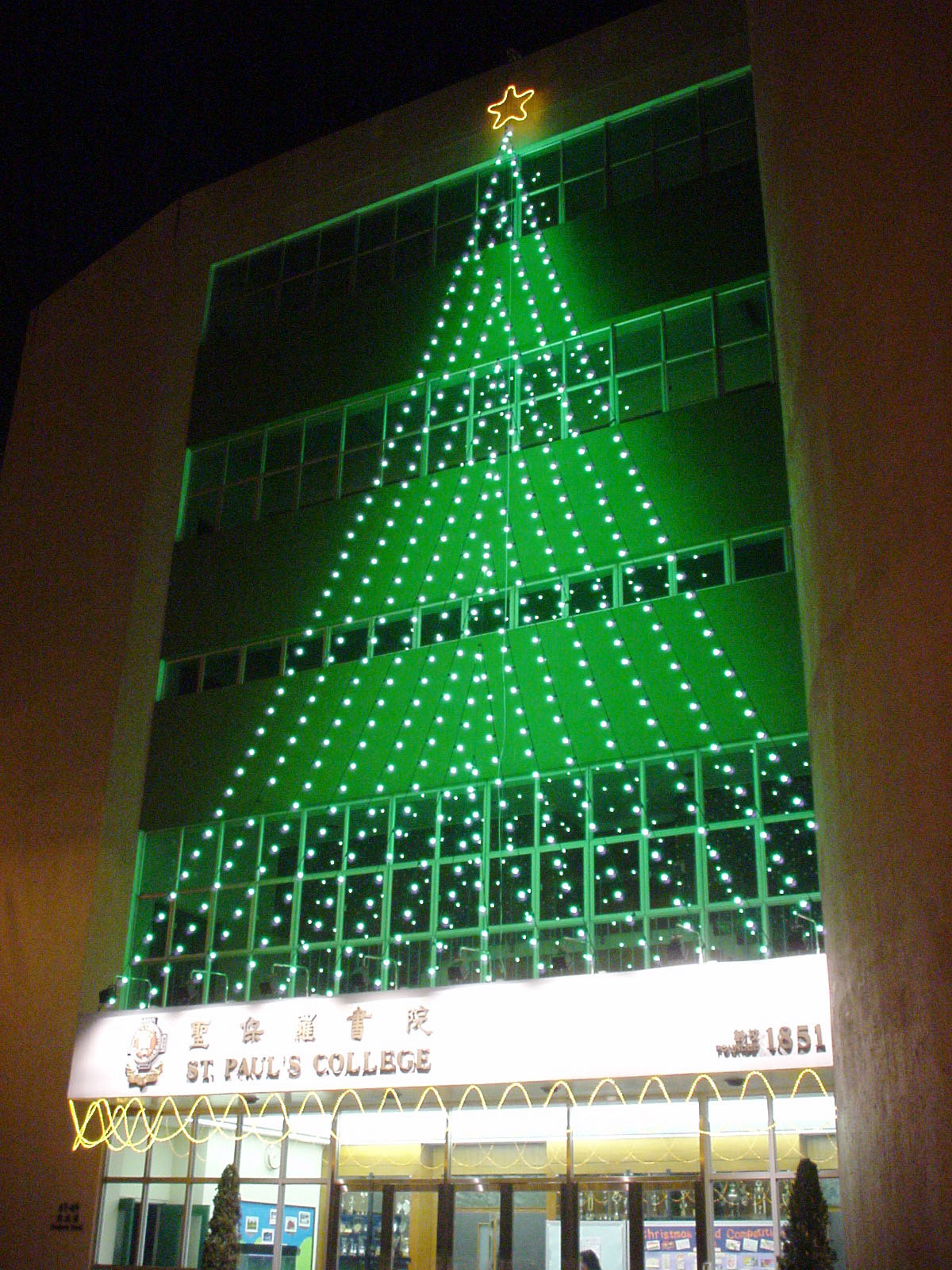
The Entrance to St. Paul's College at Christmas

== College badge ==
The College Badge

=== The coat of arms ===
The college's coat of arms is similar to the coat of arms of the Hong Kong Sheng Kung Hui, indicating that St. Paul's College is a school sponsored by the Sheng Kung Hui.

=== The scallop shell ===
The scallop shell was the emblem of St. James the Great, who was the patron saint of pilgrims. One legend describes how he travelled to Northwest Spain, and preached there for seven years. He was later beheaded in Judea by King Herod Agrippa I (Acts 12:2). According to the legend, his body was eventually taken back to Spain and buried at Santiago de Compostela. From the ninth century to the 16th century, hundreds of thousands of Christians came to Santiago de Compostela on pilgrimages, expeditions made by individuals or groups to places where God had shown His power in some special ways. Often the journeys were long and dangerous. The pilgrims did not mind, because they believed their spiritual lives would be enriched and deepened by their pilgrimage.

Often the pilgrim wore on his hat or cloak a badge indicating his destination. Those going to Santiago de Compostela wore a scallop shell. Perhaps it was a reminder of the small boats in which many of them travelled. Perhaps it had a more practical use as a vessel used in baptism or a drinking vessel. At any rate, the scallop shell eventually became a sign of pilgrimage in general, a symbol of baptism, signifying new life. The pilgrims carried new ways of thinking and of doing things to places that were deeply isolated from the larger world. Pilgrims were people on the move, people on the way to somewhere else. Like the pilgrims of old, Paulines are people on the move. When they leave school, many of them go to other parts of the world, bringing with them new ways of thinking and new ways of doing things. Even those who stay in Hong Kong are also pilgrims of a sort, for life itself is like a journey from childhood to youth, to middle age and beyond.

=== The shepherd's staff ===
The shepherd's staff was used by the shepherd to keep the sheep on the right path. Jesus often used this illustration in his teaching, so the shepherd's staff has become the symbol of the care and guidance which the church minister (pastor or priest) gives to others. This care involves showing active concern for the physical, social, psychological and spiritual well-being of a person in practical ways. It is not only clergymen who show this kind of care; teachers and social workers often show this level of concern for many.

=== The key ===
The key is symbolic of the words of Jesus to Peter, "I will give you the keys of the kingdom of Heaven" (Matthew 16:19). William Barclay, a well-known Christian author, wrote: "The promise that Peter would have the keys to the Kingdom was the promise that Peter would be the means of opening the door to God for thousands upon thousands of people in the days to come. The plain fact is that it is not only Peter who has the keys of the Kingdom, every Christian has, for it is open to every one of us to open the door of the Kingdom to someone, and to enter into the great promise of Jesus Christ."

=== The open book ===
The open book symbolises the Bible – open for all to read. The Bishop of Guidford wrote: "The whole Bible is a gift of God to the world. He guided its many writers and he watched over its editing and completion during many generations. For many years he has strengthened and guided his people through the pages of the Bible ... He continues to speak to us and our contemporaries as we read and study its pages." The open book also suggests knowledge.

=== The crown ===
Above all of the other symbols is a crown, possibly reminiscent of the tradition that the three wise men, or Magi, who came from the east to worship the infant Jesus, were also kings. Tradition has generally supposed that they came from Persia or Arabia, but they may have come from as far away as China.

The crown may also symbolise the crown of life which God has promised to those who love him (James 1:12). "The Christian," wrote William Barclay, "has a joy that no other man can ever have. Life for him is like being for ever at a feast. He has a royalty that other men have never realized for, however humble his earthly circumstances, he is the child of God."

=== The cross ===
In the school badge, the diocesan emblems are surrounded by a cross, which symbolises self-sacrifice, such as when Jesus died on a cross. As Jesus died on a cross, the cross reminds us how much God loves us. As Jesus rose from the dead, the empty cross reminds us of Christ's risen life, and his victory over the powers of evil. However strong the forces of evil are, Love - Christ's kind of love - lives on and conquers all. So the cross is the Christian's badge. We are all encouraged to love God, and to love our neighbours as ourselves.

=== The motto ===
The Chinese characters in the motto under the cross are from Proverbs 1:7, translated in English as "The fear of the Lord is the beginning of wisdom (some translations wrote knowledge. Although both are correct, the most accurate one is wisdom)." The Hebrew version could be translated as "The most important part of knowledge is reverence for the Lord." The fact that the motto is in Chinese is significant. It was more the fashion at that time to use Latin for such a purpose. When St. Paul's College was founded, the primary focus was to offer Chinese youths a modern, liberal education in the English language, while including the subject of Chinese language in the curriculum, upon Christian principles. Bringing together the cultures of East and West and the fostering of bilingualism have been well-established traditions in the school.

== Campus ==
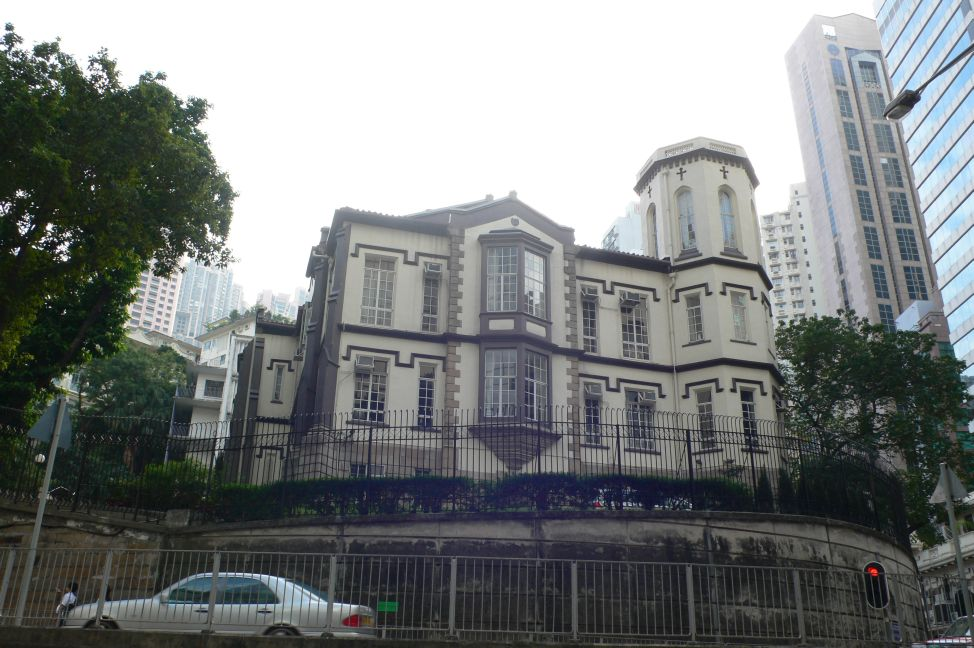
Bishop's House, the campus of St. Paul's before 1941

The current campus is located at 69 Bonham Road, Western District, Hong Kong.

For 100 years before World War II, St. Paul's College was located in Glenealy (also known as "Tit Kong"), in the Central District, in the buildings currently called Bishop's House, which are presently the headquarters of the Hong Kong Sheng Kung Hui. The college buildings were occupied during the war, leading to St. Paul's College being merged with St. Paul's Girls' School to form St. Paul's Co-educational College (SPCC).

At the end of the occupation, St. Paul's College was re-established in its own right and granted permission to use the former HKU St. John's College site as its new campus. By the mid-1960s, all of the former St. John's Hall buildings had been replaced.

=== Current campus at Bonham Road ===
The land (Inland Lot No. 7935) at Bonham Road on which St. Paul's College now stand was a private residence known as "Fairlea" in the early colonial days. In the 1880s, the small boarding school for Chinese girls founded by missionary and educator Margaret Johnstone moved into Fairlea. The boarding school was taken over by the Church Missionary Society in 1886 and named Fairlea Girls' School, and is one of the predecessors of the current Heep Yunn School.

The University of Hong Kong was formed in 1911, and in its early days, it was compulsory for all students to live in a residential hall. Being directly opposite the Main Building of HKU, Fairlea was converted into St. John's Hall, the first hall of the newly founded university. Fairlea Girls' School moved to 4–6 Babington Path as a result. During the Japanese occupation of Hong Kong, St. John's Hall was occupied by an infantry company and also acted as a shelter for local Anglo-Indian and Eurasian refugees, and the Hall was extensively looted after the surrender of Japan. As HKU recommenced classes in 1946, St. John's Hall reopened in 1947 with the aid from the Education Department, with the condition that the latter could use the West Wing of St. John's Hall, location of which is now SPC's Stewart Building. The affiliated primary school of Northcote Training College soon moved in. When SPC regained its independence in 1950, it initially occupied the West Wing as well.

The Anglican Church proposed merging St. John's Hall with St. Stephen's Hall, a female-only hall, into the co-educational St. John's College (SJC). SJC subsequently moved into its new premises at 82 Pokfulam Road in 1955, leaving the whole premises at Bonham Road for St. Paul's College's use. The Wong Ming Him Hall, the oldest building existing in the campus nowadays, was built in 1951. The three-storey, multi-purpose building once housed a table tennis room, art room and music room. The building was renovated in 2007–2008 and now houses a multi-purpose rehearsal room, a board room and the archives. The college swimming pool, known in full as "St. Paul's College Alumni Association Tse Yu Chuen Swimming Pool" (聖保羅書院同學會謝雨川游泳池), was officially opened on 8 November 1979. The pool is next to the Wong Ming Him Hall and was named after the alumnus who initiated the fundraising campaign for its construction.

The original St. John's Hall building as well as Wong Ming Him Hall was deemed inadequate owing to the college's rapid growth, to an extent that AM PM double-shift schooling was adopted in 1961 and 1962. As a result, the college started the planning of a thorough campus redevelopment scheme with alumnus and architect Szeto Wai in 1962, and construction started in the same year. The old St. John's Hall building was torn down and replaced by four new blocks, namely the North Wing, East Wing and West Wing (now renamed Stewart Building), as well as the now demolished Primary School Block. This layout remained unchanged until the 2000s, when the college carried out a School Improvement programme.

==== School Improvement Programme ====
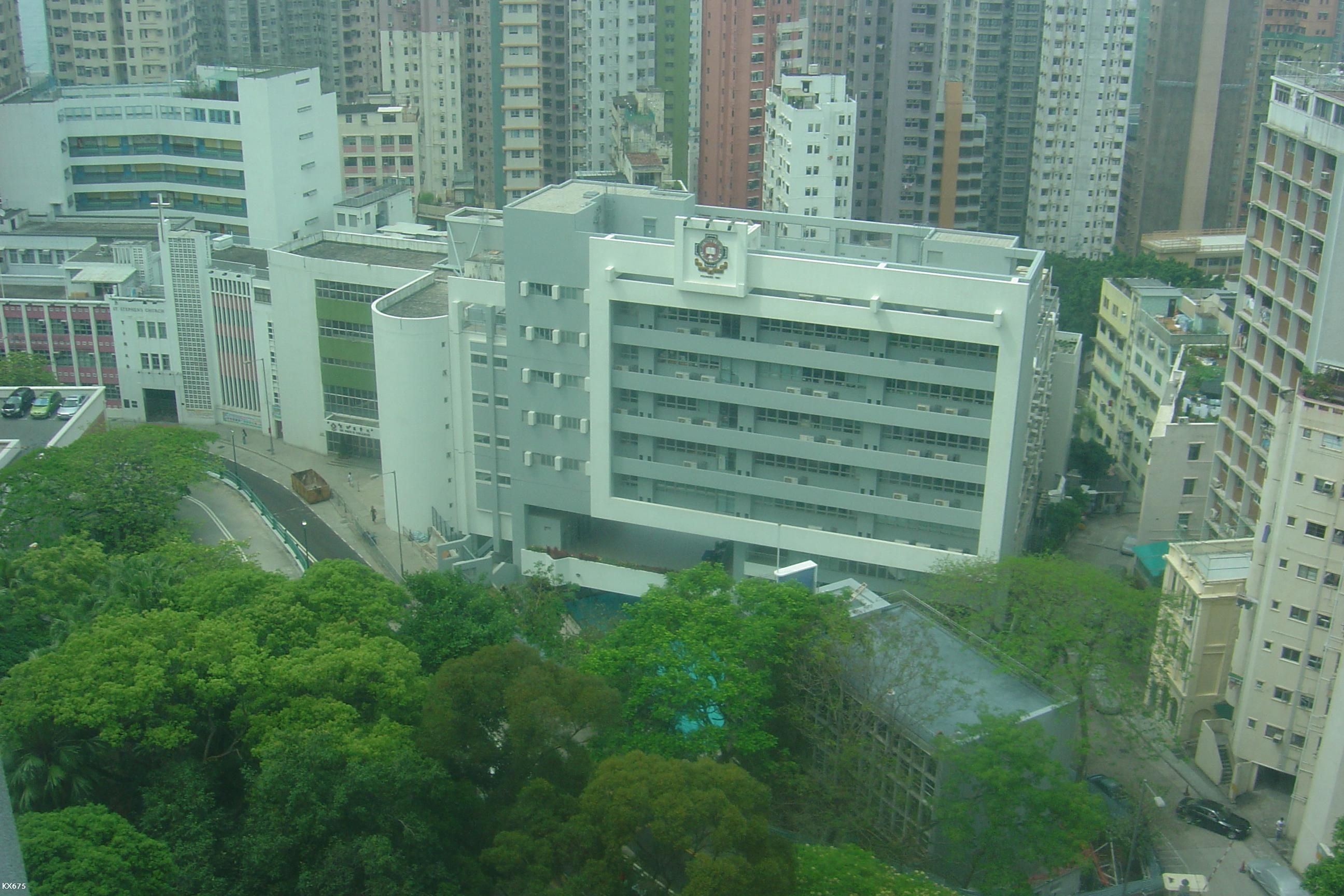
View of St. Paul's College's New South Wing from the University of Hong Kong, 2009

In 2003, the college implemented a School Improvement Programme (SIP) with a view to construct a new administration and teaching block above the swimming pool area. To make way for the new building, the college demolished the former primary school building.

The intake of the New South Wing occurred in October 2006, and was officially opened by Peter Kwong Kong-kit, the then Archbishop of Hong Kong, on 15 December of the same year. It houses the college office, a principal's room, art rooms, music rooms and staff rooms.

=== Primary school campus ===
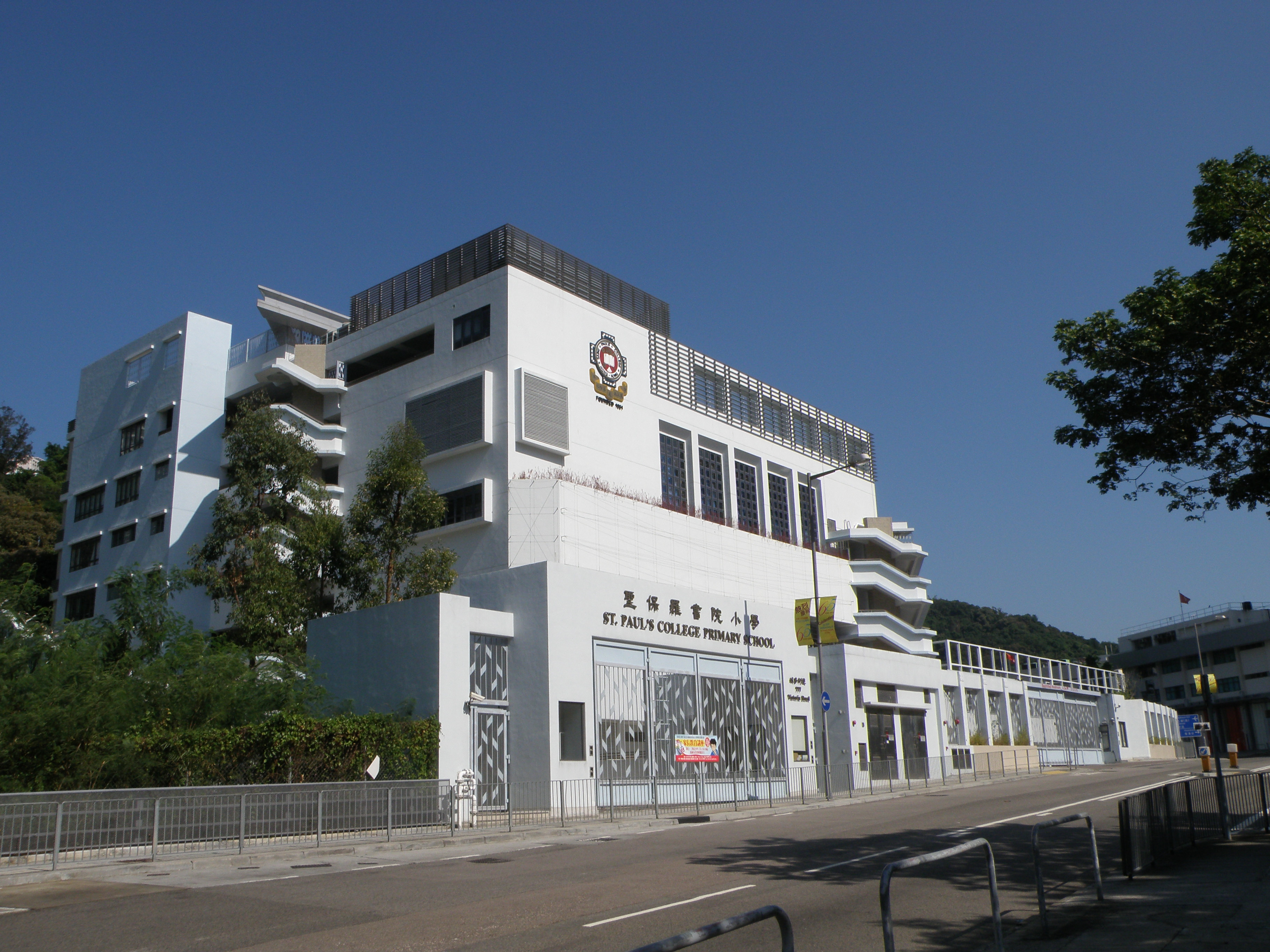
The Primary School's new campus at Victoria Road

In 1993, St. Paul's College Primary School (SPCPS) moved to its own campus at 70 Hill Road, which formerly housed Hill Road Government Primary School (before 1977), Buddhist Chi Hong College (1977–1990) and Lok Sin Tong Leung Kau Kui College (1991–1992).

In addition to 18 classrooms, the Hill Road campus included a school hall, conference room, music room, computer room, library, multi-purpose room, English language room, counselling room, first aid room, visual arts and science room, chapel and tuck shop.

A new campus for SPCPS was completed in 2012, and SPCPS moved in subsequently. The new campus is located at the junction of Pok Fu Lam Road and Victoria Road near Wah Fu Estate in Pok Fu Lam. The vacated Hill Road campus is handed over to SKH St. Peter's Primary School, another primary school sponsored by Sheng Kung Hui, enabling the latter's conversion to whole day operation.

== College song and hymn ==
The old college song was titled The Old St. Paul's College, based on the 18th century ballad "John Peel".

The current college song was composed in the 1970s by Rev. Moses Wu, the music teacher at the time, with lyrics by C.F. Miles. It is generally sung during major college events such as Speech Day, the Swimming Gala and Sports Day. The college song is played by the college orchestra at Speech Day.

The College Hymn, We Build Our School on Thee, O Lord, is also sung during important services and at morning assemblies.

=== College song clapping controversy ===
It has been a norm for the students of St. Paul's College to clap at the College Song's penultimate sentence, i.e. right after "Down the years we will be faithful". The norm is rumoured to have originated from the primary school section in the 1980s, later spreading to the secondary section as tens of primary school section's students were directly promoted annually.

According to retired Careers Master W. F. Ryan, a student in 1986 forgot some lyrics of the College Song and substituted them by clapping. Other students soon followed suit. Raymond Y. K. Fu, Head of Music Department from 1981 to 2013, had opposed such act as he deemed it "disrespectful". It nonetheless continued for over ten years until 2006, when Dr. J. R. Kennard - the principal succeeding Timothy W. H. Ha - announced a ban on his first morning assembly, arguing that the clapping goes against the school's traditions and he needed to do so "at the request of the alumni association". Dr. J.R. Kennard retracted his position later as he realized that the clapping is a manifestation of loyalty.

Dr. J.R. Kennard explained the ban was merely enforced during public events, such as Sports Day and Speech Day (graduation ceremony). Five years after he first announced the ban, Dr. Kennard announced on 8 July 2011 that the ban would be lifted one off during the end-of-term assembly. However, on 1 September 2011, students continued the clapping - signalling the end of the ban once and for all. Ever since, the clapping has occurred whenever the College Song is sung. As of 9 July 2021 – 10 years from the ban's end – current principal Dr. Dennis Yuen does not show any objection, and students still clapped at the end of the College Song in the end-of-term assembly.

== Publications ==
The college's Student Publications Council (學生出版社) is responsible for the publication of Wayfarer, the college magazine, and Scope, the college newspaper. Formerly regarded as part of the Students' Association, the council has always functioned as a separate entity.

=== Wayfarer ===
Wayfarer (Chinese: 弘道; pinyin: Hóngdào; Jyutping: Wang4 dou3) is the school magazine of St. Paul's College, serving the function as a yearbook. The issue for each academic year is published in December of the following school year.

The name Wayfarer, which means "a traveller on foot," symbolises achieving dreams by eliminating obstacles; the Chinese name is derived from the quote "人能弘道，非道弘人" (A man can enlarge the principles which he follows; those principles do not enlarge the man.) taken from the Book of Duke Ling of Wei in the Analects.

The aims of publishing Wayfarer, as stated in its inaugural issue (1957–58), are:

- To organise systematically a history record of the college for future reference;
- To provide with students and teachers a platform of voicing out what they think, so that their talents can be seen;
- To compile a collection of excellent works so as to encourage and inspire the future generations.

Wayfarer was first published in 1958, but was subsequently suspended until 1963, when the college started to publish Wayfarer annually. Each issue is prepared by an editorial board formed by students, under the supervision of teacher advisors, since the 4th issue (1965–66) - the first three issues were prepared entirely by teachers.

Printed in black-and-white for more than 40 years, the first Wayfarer in colour, Issue 45, was published for the 2006–2007 academic year (155th Anniversary of the college). As of December 2013, Wayfarer has published 51 issues.

Wayfarer is a bilingual publication. Contents include college report, photographs of classes and groups, club reports, features and contributions.

Other than Wayfarer, the college also composes a book with passages written by students throughout the term.

== Activities and achievements ==
=== Academic ===
The HKCEE and HKALE results of the school are sound with a very high percentage of students reaching the entrance requirements for local university and matriculation degrees. With the start of new examination, HKDSE, there is still a very high percentage of students meeting general requirements (33222) for local undergraduate university programmes. Besides local universities, the school provides chances to apply international examinations, like IAL, GCE. Students are able to enter foreign universities through international examination. Past SPC students have attended Princeton University, Cambridge University, Oxford University, Cornell, UPenn, and other prestigious institutions.

=== Sports ===
Sports activities at the inter-class, inter-house and inter-school levels range from track and field, cross-country racing, swimming, lifesaving, canoeing, gymnastics and judo, to basketball, football, handball, volleyball, badminton, table tennis, field hockey, and squash. The Annual Sports Day and the Swimming Gala are held every academic year.

=== Music and speech ===
Many students attend instrumental classes after school each day. The Music Union organises regular assembly concerts, the annual Music Contest and the Annual Concert. The school music teams including the choirs, the full symphony orchestra, and the Chinese orchestra, participate actively in the annual Hong Kong Schools Music Festival. Students also take part actively in groups, as well as individually, in the annual Schools Speech Festival.

An Artist-in-Residence programme was established in 2007–08 with Dr. Stephen Ng (USA: tenor) as the inaugural artist. Subsequent artists-in-residence have included Branko Stark (2008–09, Croatia: composer-conductor), Peter Walmsley (2009–10, Australia: brass-conductor), and Clive Harries (2010–11, England: organist-choir-conductor).

=== The Global Classroom programme ===
St. Paul's College launched the Global Classroom programme in 1995. Each year, a comprehensive programme of overseas visits are organised. Under the Direct Subsidy Scheme, opportunities for overseas visits have been enhanced. The Global Classroom programme usually incorporated a variety of academic themes such as language, music or sports exchange activities to encourage students to broaden their horizons and exposure to different cultures around. As of 2015, the school has organised tours to the mainland China, Taiwan, Korea, Japan, Malaysia, Singapore, India, Australia, New Zealand, the United Kingdom, France, Spain, Germany, Italy, Switzerland, Austria, Czech Republic, Greece, Iceland, Northern Europe, South Africa, Zimbabwe, etc. In addition to the Global Classroom, student exchange programmes are arranged with twin schools in China and overseas. Since 2008, Community Awareness Project, with a view to encouraging students to participate in voluntary work to serve the community and helping the disadvantaged, has been launched in the mainland. Pupils has been visiting in Luoyang, Harbin and other places in China.

==== Student exchange programme ====
In the student exchange programme on 21 September 2012 to 29 September 2012, twelve students from Christ Church Grammar School went to St. Paul's College, Hong Kong.

== St. Paul's College Alumni Association ==
St. Paul's College Alumni Association was established in 1920. There was no official name by the time it was established. By 1930, It was recorded that more than 100 alumni and the management of school were in a restaurant in the Sheung Wan to discuss the establishment of "Old Pauline Union", followed by students in Guangzhou and Shanghai and other places setting up a branch with a view to contacting alumni.

During the Japanese occupation of Hong Kong, Macao was the temporarily place where alumni gatherings took place. Until 1950, the Bonham Road school complex was completed, students were to be given a formal name for the "St. Paul's College Alumni Association" (SPCAA). The role of the SPCAA had also changed, been taking a leading role in addition to serve merely as the links between the alumni, the SPCAA will also continue to maintain contact with the school, there are four alumni representative in the College Council, together for the deliberations in school affairs.

Past Students had been actively support the alma mater of the building over the years, and had repeatedly launched campaign donations. Without the alumni support the new library, swimming pool, school auditorium air conditioning works at the Bonham Road Campus would not have been that successful. The strong alumni donations has made the new school expansion in the 1950s and 2000s possible with the professional advice by alumni of the famous architect (Patrick Lau, etc.).

Many alumni and students will also contribute to the school to set up multiple scholarships and awards funds to reward academic achievement and excellent performance of the students. In addition, SPCAA has published "From Devotion at the 150th anniversary celebration to Plurality: A full history of St. Paul's College 1851–2001" - a book to commemorate the school 150 years of development.

Since 2005, SPCAA has been organising mentorship program for matriculation students (after the implementation of the new academic structure this service is provided for the form five students) They arranged the city celebrity alumni and students form a group to participate in various activities to broaden Students of social vision and enhance different years to graduate students in the St. Paul's alumni contact.

== St. Paul's College Parent Teacher Association ==
St. Paul's College Parent Teacher Association (also known as PTA) was established in 1994, aims to promote the relationship between the school and the student's family. Have been organising activities include book fairs, seminars and visits to the newspaper, etc., PTA each year parents sends teams to participate in the school's yearly Sports Day. PTA Annual General Meeting will be held once a year to elect the President and Director of the year.

Current PTA Chairman is Philip Yeung (楊文達先生), who is also SPC Alumni.

== St. Paul's College Foundation ==
St. Paul's College Foundation Ltd. was established in 2008, aims to raise funds for the school and outside the government-funded tuition in order to provide a first-class learning environment for students. Foundation supports projects include scholarships, campus to promote e-learning, the establishment of schools in Church archives historical documents and so on. In addition, the Foundation also play an important role in the primary school relocation to new premises at Victoria Road by raising campaign funds.

== Linked schools and alliances ==
In line with the vision of the Global Classroom, the college formally established a Twin-school Programme which aimed at widening students' global perspectives and building links between teachers and students of leading schools around the world through various exchange activities and mutual visits. St. Paul's College is a member school of the International Boys' Schools Coalition (IBSC). John Richard Kennard sat on the Board of Trustees (2008–2017) as vice-president (Asia). Major IBSC member schools include fellow Anglican schools Eton College (London) and The King's School (Sydney).

Schools linked by exchanges with St. Paul's College include:

1. High School Affiliated to Xi'an Jiaotong University, Xi'an, China
2. High School Affiliated to Shanghai Jiao Tong University, Shanghai, China
3. Barker College, Sydney, Australia
4. Heimschule Lender, Sasbach, Germany
5. St. Mark's School of Texas, Dallas, USA
6. Mayo College, Ajmer, India
7. Senri International School, Osaka, Japan
8. Trinity-Pawling School, New York State, USA
9. Anglican High School, Singapore

== Connections with other schools ==
Being the first school established by the Anglican Church of England in Hong Kong, St Paul's has a close relationship with many other educational institutions in the city.

- Lady Smith, wife of the second principal Bishop George Smith, is the founder of Diocesan Girls' School and Diocesan Boys' School.
- St. Paul's College and St. Joseph's College organised the first inter-school sports competitions in Hong Kong in 1877.
- The current Bonham Road campus used to be the former campus of Fairlea Girls' School (Heep Yunn School) from 1886 to 1912. The site at 67–69 Bonham Road was subsequently converted into St. John's College, one of the residential halls of the University of Hong Kong.
- Revd A.D. Stewart helped Au Chak Mun and Mok Kon Sang in founding Munsang College; Stewart was also the headmaster of St. Stephen's College during 1914–1915. St. Paul's College's School Hall was named after Mok Kon Sang before renovation works in the 2010s.
- Revd A.D. Stewart's sister Kathleen Stewart founded St. Paul's Girls' College, which was later amalgamated with St. Paul's College into St. Paul's Co-educational College after WWII.
- St. Mark's School was once located in Central Glenealy as the St. Paul's English PM School.
- The history of Hong Kong Institute of Education can be traced back to 1853 where St. Paul's College offered the then-colony's first formal teacher training courses.
- Revd. Geoffrey Speak, the ninth principal, founded the Island School.
- Timothy Ha, MBE, JP, participated in the naming of The Hong Kong University of Science and Technology. Its naming stood out from more than one hundred suggestions and became the name of the third university in Hong Kong.
- The first Hong Kong Brands and Products Expo was held in 1938 at Central in St. Paul's College, where there were only 40 exhibitors and 86 booths.

== Notable alumni ==
The older alumni Wu Tingfang, Wang Chonghui, SK Yee and Chung Sze-yuen are known as the "Four doctors of St. Paul's" (聖保羅四博士) by the older generation of old boys.

=== Politics and civil service ===
==== Politicians before the World Wars ====
- Wu Tingfang (伍廷芳), a Chinese politician who served as the Minister of Foreign Affairs of the Republic of China during the early 1910s, Hong Kong's first ethnic Chinese barrister, the first ethnic Chinese member of the Legislative Council of Hong Kong, Hong Kong's first ethnic Chinese Justice of the Peace.
- Yeung Ku-wan (楊衢雲), a Chinese revolutionary, first president of the Hong Kong Chapter of the Revive China Society
- Wang Chonghui (王寵惠), a prominent Chinese jurist, diplomat and politician, Republic of China Justice Minister and Foreign Minister, a judge on the Permanent Court of International Justice in the Hague
- Y.C. James Yen (晏陽初), a Chinese educator and organiser who turned to the villages of China to organise Rural Reconstruction, most famously at Ding Xian, a county in Hebei, from 1926 to 1937
- SK Yee(余兆麒), Republic of China World War II general, the ROC Armed Services Committee, led the third director of the Office of the United States Michigan University JD, founder of the Chinese Bank founded in 1983, leading the SK Yee Medical Foundation contribution to medical services

==== Government officials and legislators ====
- Sir Chung Sze-yuen (鍾士元), GBE, GBM, a mechanical engineer, industrialist, business executive and politician in Hong Kong
- Stephen Ip Shu-kwan (葉澍堃), GBS, JP, former Secretary for Economic Development and Labour of the Hong Kong Government
- Joseph Yam Chi-kwong (任志剛), GBM, JP, former Chief Executive of the Hong Kong Monetary Authority
- Lee Wing-tat (李永達), member of the Legislative Council of Hong Kong and former Chairman of the Democratic Party of Hong Kong
- Jasper Tsang Yok-sing (曾鈺成), GBS, JP member of both the Executive Council of Hong Kong and Legislative Council of Hong Kong, former Chairman of the Democratic Alliance for the Betterment of Hong Kong (DAB), National committee member of the Chinese People's Political Consultative Conference of the People's Republic of China
- Tsang Tak-sing (曾德成), GBS, JP, Secretary for Home Affairs, Hong Kong Government (see 1967 Hong Kong riots).
- Lau Siu-kai (劉兆佳), GBS, JP, Head of Central Policy Unit, Hong Kong Government
- Patrick Lau (劉秀成), SBS, JP, former President of Hong Kong Institute of Architects and member of the Legislative Council of Hong Kong
- Lo Wing-lok (勞永樂), JP, former legislative councillor and president of Hong Kong Medical Association
- Lau Kong-wah (劉江華), defeated member of the Legislative Council of Hong Kong; Undersecretary of the Constitutional and Mainland Affairs Bureau
- (Shun Chi-ming岑智明), FRMetS, JP, Director of the Hong Kong Observatory; President of Commission for Aeronautical Meteorology, World Meteorological Organization
- Fernando Cheung (張超雄), a Hong Kong politician, vice-chairman of the Labour Party
- Kenneth Ting (丁午壽), former Hong Kong Legislative Council member, Hong Kong Industries Honorary President, CMA Honorary President, former Liberal Party Vice-chairman

=== Architecture ===
- I.M. Pei (貝聿銘), a Pritzker Prize-winning and internationally renowned architect whose important works include the Louvre Pyramid in Paris, the JFK Presidential Library and Museum in Boston, and the Bank of China in Hong Kong, Honorary Doctor of Letters of the University of Hong Kong (1990)
- Szeto Wai (司徒惠), architect, 1956, 1974 Hong Kong Legislative Council Unofficial Member of the, 1971, 1976 Hong Kong Executive Council Unofficial Member, 1975 University of Hong Kong Honorary Doctor of Science, 1978 Chinese University of Hong Kong reputation Doctor of Laws. He was the chief architect responsible for the design of the college's buildings at Bonham Road.

=== Legal ===
- Gallant Ho Yiu-ti (何耀棣): lawyer, founder, on behalf of the eighth NPC Guangdong Province, Consumer Council of Hong Kong chairman, former St. Paul's College Alumni president
- Alan Hoo (胡漢清): Senior Counsel (Call: 1975; Inner: 1990), member of national committee of the Chinese People's Political Consultative Conference
- Ma Ho-fai (馬豪輝): Solicitor, Partner of Messrs. Woo Kwan Lee & Co, 11th National People's Congress on behalf of Hong Kong Island

=== Religious ===
- Peter Kwong Kong-kit (鄺廣傑), first Archbishop and Primate of the Hong Kong Sheng Kung Hui Province, retired at the end of 2006, now Bishop Emeritus of the Diocese of Hong Kong Island, Hong Kong Sheng Kung Hui, Honorary Doctor of Divinity of the University of Hong Kong (2000)

=== Medical ===
- Victor Chang Yam-him (張任謙), cardiac surgeon and humanitarian, a world pioneer in heart and lung transplants. In 1986, he was awarded the Companion of the Order of Australia honours. He was murdered in July 1991 outside his home in Sydney by two extortionists. In Sydney, the Victor Chang Cardiac Research Institute was opened in 1994 to commemorate his work and service.
- Freddie Fu Ho-keong (傅浩強), St. Paul's Class of 1968, pioneer orthopaedic sports medicine surgeon. He is a Distinguished Service Professor at the University of Pittsburgh, David Silver Professor and Chairman of the Department of Orthopaedic Surgery at the University of Pittsburgh School of Medicine and Head Team Physician for the University of Pittsburgh Department of Athletics. Most notably, he is renowned for pioneering the technique and concepts of anatomic anterior cruciate ligament reconstruction.

=== Entertainment and mass media ===
- Ching Cheong (程翔), senior journalist and chief correspondent of The Straits Times; was detained in the People's Republic of China under suspicion of espionage during his research for news in Mainland China
- Lai Man-Wai (黎民偉), Hong Kong film actor and director
- Raymond Lam Fung (林峯), TVB actor
- Lawrence Cheng (鄭丹瑞), Hong Kong film actor, director, screenwriter, and producer, DJ and radio channel executive
- Alex To (杜德偉), Hong Kong and Taiwan based singer and actor
- Paul Lin (林子揚), writer, composer and head of a political discussion online forum in Hong Kong
- Simon Lui (雷宇揚), Hong Kong artist

=== Music and cultural ===
- Ho Fuk Yan (何福仁), writer and poet, retired teacher and former Head of Chinese Department at St. Paul's College

=== Sports ===
- Chan Hiu Ming (陳曉明), football coach, Hong Kong Football Association technical and development director, former national team assistant, coach of Hong Kong First Division club Wofoo Tai Po as well as manager of Workable FC and Eastern

== Former headteachers ==
	English name	Chinese name	Tenure	Remarks
Principals of the Secondary Section
1.	Vincent John Stanton	史丹頓牧師	1849–1850 (as Warden)	Founder of St. Paul's College and the first Colonial Chaplain of Hong Kong.
2.	Bishop George Smith	施美夫主教	1851–1861, 1864-1866 (as Warden)	Smith's wife helped establish Diocesan Girls' School.
3.	John Fryer	傅蘭雅先生	1861–1863 (as Warden)	Later head of the Anglo-Chinese School, Shanghai, and Shanghai Polytechnic Institute, and Professor of Oriental Language and Literature, UC Berkeley
4.	Bishop Charles Richard Alford	柯爾福主教	1867–1872 (as Warden)	
5.	Bishop John Shaw Burdon	包爾騰主教	1874–1897 (as Warden)	
6.	Bishop Joseph Charles Hoare	霍約瑟主教	1898–1906 (as Warden)	Hoare was shipwrecked along with four other students when they were on a boat to Castle Peak, Tuen Mun for a missionary visit.
7.	Bishop Gerard Heath Lander	倫義華主教	1906–1909 (as Warden)	
8.	Arthur Dudley Stewart	史超域牧師	1909–1930	The Reverend Stewart's sister, Kathleen Stewart founded St. Paul Girls' College. The Stewart Building is named after him and his younger brother Colonel Stewart who took up the principalship after he retired.
9.	Colonel Evan George Stewart, DSO, OBE, ED	史伊尹上校	1930–1958	Colonel Stewart participated in both World War I and World War II. He served as the Honorary Colonel of the Royal Hong Kong Regiment because of his contribution in the Battle of Hong Kong.
10.	Geoffrey Lowrey Speak, OBE	史璧琦牧師	1958–1967	Speak left St. Paul's to become the founding principal of Island School.
	R.G. Wells	韋爾思先生	1967–1968	Acting Principal following Speak's departure.
11.	Timothy Ha Wing-ho, MBE, JP	夏永豪 MBE 太平紳士	1968–2006	Ha was the first local-trained Principal. Unlike most of his predecessors, he was not from an Oxbridge background. He is the longest-serving principal at St. Paul's College.
12.	John Richard Kennard	甘納德博士	2006–2014	Kennard is an Australian-British and is the only principal with a doctorate. He left the college to become principal of The British School Warsaw.
13.	Dennis Yuen Dick-yan	源迪恩先生	2014-2025	Yuen was appointed as Acting Principal in the school year of 2014–2015. He assumed the post of principal on an acting basis after September 2015.
14.	Michael Mak Chi-ho	麥志豪先生	2025-	Before heading the secondary section, Mak was the headmaster of St. Paul's College Primary School.
Headmasters/Headmistresses of the Primary Section
1.	Rev. Chiu Lin-chun	招練俊牧師	1960–1970	
2.	Leung Chung-por, MH	梁松波先生 MH	1970–2001	Leung was the longest serving headmaster
3.	Yvonne Chan Chin Mo-chun	陳陳慕珍女士	2001–2016	Chan was the first headmistress. All her predecessors were men.
4.	Michael Mak Chi-ho	麥志豪先生	2016–2025	Prior to his appointment, Mak was the Vice Principal of the Secondary Section

== See also ==
- Education in Hong Kong
