= James Summers (educator) =

- Born: 5 July 1828; Lichfield, Staffordshire
- Died: 26 October 1891 (aged 63); Tokyo, Japan
- Occupations: Sinologist, O-yatoi gaikokujin

James Summers (5 July 1828 – 26 October 1891) was an English educator, sinologist, editor, printer and cataloguer who made significant contributions to the study, teaching and knowledge dissemination of East Asian languages in the 19th-century London. He began his career as a tutor at St. Paul's College, Hong Kong (1850–1851), before being appointed Professor of Chinese at King's College London, a position he held for two decades (1853–1873).

Alongside his teaching career at King's College London, Summers served as a cataloguer and archivist at the British Museum and the India Office Library, further establishing his experience and exposure to understand on East Asian texts, manuscripts and artefacts. He was the editor of The Chinese and Japanese Repository (1863-1864), The Phoenix (1869; co-edited with Reinhold Rost). In 1873, he was hired by the Meiji government of Japan to develop an English language curriculum at the Kaisei Gakuin, the precursor to Tokyo Imperial University, and is buried in the foreign cemetery in Yokohama.

== Early life ==
Summers was born in Lichfield, Staffordshire. His father was a plasterer of limited means, and seems to have left his family some time before James became 10 years old. Summers moved from Bird Street to the Close with his mother and went to the Lichfield Diocesan Training School for about one year from September 1844 to November 1845. He moved again to Stoke-on-Trent with his mother and started his teaching career at a National School there. His mother died in 1846.

== Hong Kong and Chinese ==
In 1848, Summers was hired by Reverend Vincent John Stanton to be a tutor at St. Paul's College in Hong Kong, where he taught General subject including History and religious studies. He used Nicholls's Help To Reading The Bible (1846) in his religious class when teaching young Hong Kong children. Stanton's Anglo-Chinese School opened in September 1848 upon the arrival of Summers at the property where the Bishop's House now stands, close to Wyndham Street. Summers lived with Stanton's family until they left for England because of health issues on 24 April 1850. Summers eventually became the first and last schoolmaster of that school.

In 1849, Summers was arrested and imprisoned while on an excursion to Portuguese Macau for failing to doff his hat for a festival procession celebrating the Feast of Corpus Christi. Captain Henry Keppel, the captain of HMS Maeander, requested the Portuguese authorities in Macau to release Summers, which was rejected. An incensed Keppel formed a rescue party from the crew of Maeander and attacked the gaol where Summers was held, freeing him. However, the raid led to an international incident between Britain and Portugal as four Portuguese soldiers and the daughter of a gaoler were killed or injured. Maria II of Portugal was deeply angered after hearing of the raid, and tensions only cooled after the British government apologised and paid reparations.

When the school was transferred to the Bishop of Victoria, George Smith, and reopened as St. Paul's College on 8 April 1850, Summers became its third tutor. The other two were Rev. E. T. R. Moncrieff as senior tutor, and M. C. Odell as junior tutor, both of whom arrived at Hong Kong on 29 March 1850, accompanying Smith. As soon as he was appointed the Bishop of Victoria on 29 May 1849, Smith accepted Stanton's offer to transfer the property and building of Stanton's school—Stanton had the intention to leave Hong Kong in April 1849 at the latest—and made clear his plan the next month to develop it into a college as the ex-officio warden and with at least two clerical fellow labourers; that is, Moncrieff and Odell. The plan was approved by the Archbishop of Canterbury on 15 October 1849; however, the buildings standing now at the same place were completed in November 1851 after nearly 1 year of construction beginning in January.

Summers was likely to resign from the college during their first summer vacation, when Smith dismissed 12 pupils with poor academic performance and reduced the number of students to 10. One reason would attribute to the requirement of Smith: The tutors had to be in ‘Holy Orders', but he was not. Summers left Hong Kong with Smith on 23 September 1850, on HMS Reynard. During the trip, on 3 October, they landed on Ryukyu (Loochoo)—the vassal state of the Satsuma Domain in Japan at the time—and stayed for a week at the residence of Bernard Jean Bettelheim, a medical missionary of the Loochoo Naval Mission. During his short stay in Ryukyu, he drew several sketches, the excellence of which much surprised Bettelheim, and he became the godfather of the newly born daughter of Bettelheim and named her Lucy Fanny Loochoo. They departed there for Shanghai on the 19th of the same month.

Summers and Smith arrived at Shanghai on 14 October 1850. Soon in the same month, Summers was hired by William Jones Boone, the Bishop of Shanghai of the Protestant Episcopal Church Mission, as a temporary superintendent at his mission school. Summers, then, was hired by Hobson, colonial chaplain at Shanghai, to teach at his private boarding school opened in his house. Summers stopped teaching at Hobson's school for health reasons by the end of January 1852, and he left Shanghai for England in the spring, at almost the same time his ex-colleague Moncrieff was expelled from the Church Missionary Society and the position of acting colonial chaplain in Hong Kong on the grounds of an immoral relationship with the then-widow of Charles Gutzlaff.

== London and Chinese ==
In 1854, aged then only 25, Summers became professor of Chinese language of King's College at the University of London despite his lack of a formal education and his being generally considered poorly qualified for the post.

In 1863, Summers published a first book on the Chinese language, and the following year translated the Bible into Shanghai dialect (using the Latin alphabet). His services and lectures were in great demand by diplomats, missionaries and merchants intending to travel to China. One of his students was Ernest M. Satow, who travelled to Japan as an interpreter in the early part of the Meiji period and later became the British Consul.

While in London, Summers also published The Phoenix, a journal published monthly from July 1870 to June 1873. A total of 36 issues were published: issues 1-12 (1870-1) as The Phoenix, A Monthly Magazine for China, Japan and Eastern Asia and issues 13-16 (1871-1873) as The Phoenix, A Monthly Magazine for India, Burma, Siam, China, Japan and Eastern Asia. The journal was printed and published at 3 George Yard, Lombard Street, London.

== Japan ==
From 1864, Summers began publishing essays on the Japanese language and Japanese grammar, as well as translations of Japanese poetry and an excerpt from the Tale of the Heike in British literary magazines. It is not clear how Summers learned Japanese, but some Japanese students (including Minami Teisuke) were already in Great Britain from 1865.

In 1873, Summers published the first overseas Japanese-language newspaper, The Taisei Shinbun in London. The newspaper contained articles on Windsor Castle, Niagara Falls, the death of Napoleon, the Palace of Versailles, and news related to Britain along with advertisements. Summers intended it for Japanese students in London, but it did not sell well and soon ceased publication.

In 1872, when the Iwakura Mission visited England, Summers assisted with the visit, and was offered a position as an English teacher at the new Kaisei Gakuin (later Tokyo Imperial University) in Tokyo. He departed Southampton in mid-summer with his family, arriving in Japan in October 1873.

Summers used works by Shakespeare (notably Hamlet and Henry VIII) and John Milton in his teaching. His students included future Prime Minister Katō Takaaki, diplomat Amanō Tameyuki, and artist Okakura Kakuzō, In August 1876, after his three-year contract as an O-yatoi gaikokujin expired, Summers went to the Niigata English School as an English teacher but six months later the school was closed, and he transferred to the Osaka English School. In June 1880, Summers was invited to the Sapporo Agricultural College as a professor of English literature, where one of his students was Inazō Nitobe. In 1882, Summers returned to Tokyo, where he tutored foreign children and opened a private school in 1884.

In 1891, Summers died of a cerebral hemorrhage at his home in Tsukiji Tokyo. His widow Ellen and daughters continued the school he had established, teaching English to noted novelist Junichirō Tanizaki before it closed in 1908. Summers is buried in the foreign cemetery in Yokohama.

== Works ==
- James Summers (1863). A handbook of the Chinese language: Parts I and II, grammar and chrestomathy, prepared with a view to initiate the student of Chinese in the rudiments of this language, and to supply materials for his early studies. OXFORD: University Press. p. 370.(Oxford University)
- Summers, James A (1864). The Rudiments of the Chinese Language: With Dialogues, Exercises, and a Vocabulary. Piccadilly, London: Bernard Quaritch.
- Descriptive catalogue of the Chinese, Japanese, and Manchu books (1872)

== See also ==
- List of Sinologists
- Kwan, U.S.P. (2018). Transferring Sinosphere Knowledge to the Public: James Summers (1828–91) as Printer, Editor and Cataloguer, East Asian Publishing and Society, 8(1), 56-84. doi: https://doi.org/10.1163/22106286-12341317
