= Evan George Stewart =

British soldier (1892–1958)

Evan George Stewart 史伊尹
- Born: 27 March 1892; Bedford, England
- Died: 17 December 1958 (aged 66); Hong Kong

Colonel Evan George Stewart (史伊尹上校) DSO, OBE, ED, MA (27 March 1892 – 17 December 1958) was a British soldier, teacher and missionary to China.

Stewart was the seventh child of missionaries Robert Stewart and his wife Louisa Katherine Smyly.

He spent the first three years of his life at the Christian mission station at Kucheng in Fukien Province, until his parents were killed in 1895 during the Kucheng massacre; following this he was raised in Ireland, but travelled to Hong Kong in 1910 to teach at St. Paul's College, Hong Kong where his brother Arthur Dudley Stewart was headmaster.

He returned to Dublin to study and then joined the British army in 1915.

After the war, Stewart went on to succeed his brother and become principal of St Paul’s College.

Academic offices
Preceded by Arthur Dudley Stewart	Principal of St. Paul's College, Hong Kong; 1930–1958	Succeeded by Geoffrey Lowrey Speak
