= Foochow Mission Cemetery =

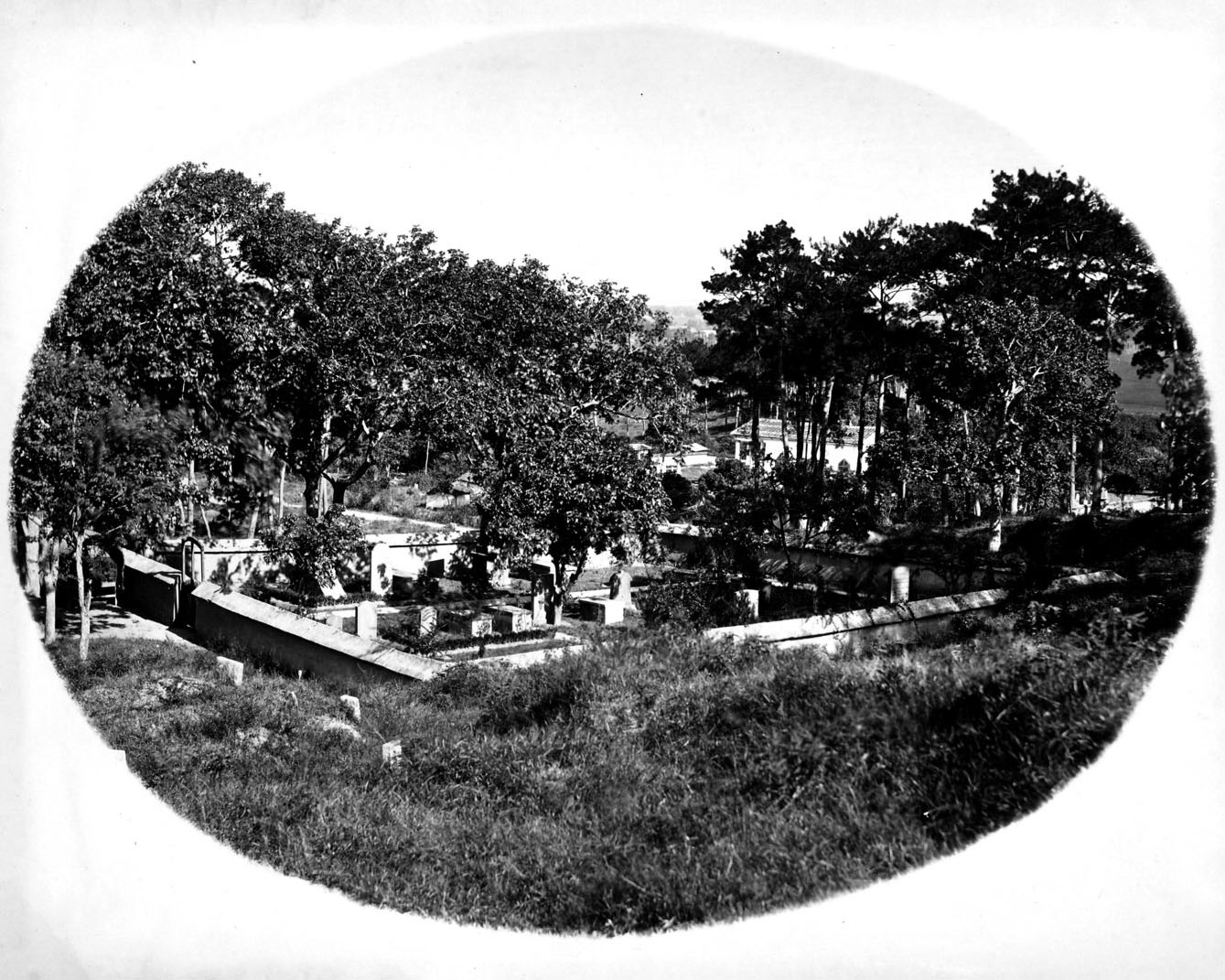
- Foochow Mission Cemetery, by G. E. Morrison

Details
- Established: 1847
- Location: Cangshan District, Fuzhou
- Country: China
- Coordinates: 26.04230°N 119.31326°E
- Type: Foreign residents (no longer extant)
- Size: 2 square kilometres (490 acres)
- No. of graves: 400

Foochow Mission Cemetery (Chinese: 洋墓亭; pinyin: Yángmùtíng; Foochow Romanized: Iòng-muó-dìng) was a Protestant cemetery once located on the north and south side of a hill at the west end of Maiyuan Road, Cangshan District, Fuzhou, China. Covering an area of about 2 kilometres (1.2 mi), Foochow Mission Cemetery had been the burial ground for the Western Protestant missionaries, medical practitioners and consuls who died in Fuzhou (then known as Foochow) since the founding of the Mission in 1847. Until 1949 there were more than 400 burials, with all tombs 2 by 1 metre (6 ft 7 in by 3 ft 3 in) in size and neatly aligned. The cemetery was demolished during the Cultural Revolution.

== Notable interments ==
- Carl Joseph Fast
- Charles Hartwell
- Nathan Sites
- Robert Warren Stewart
- Isaac William Wiley

== Gallery ==
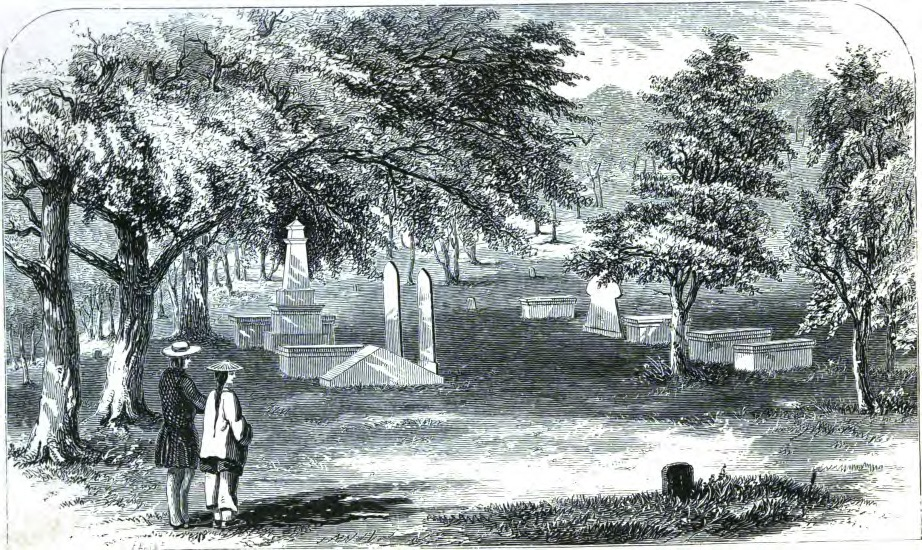
Illustration of Foochow Mission Cemetery, ca. 1858, by Erastus Wentworth

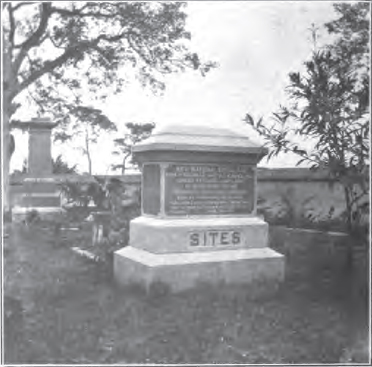
Tomb of Nathan Sites

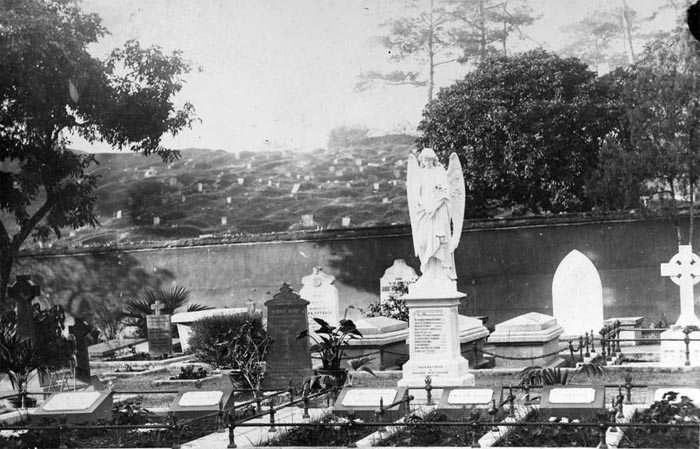
Tomb of Robert Warren Stewart and other victims of Kucheng Massacre

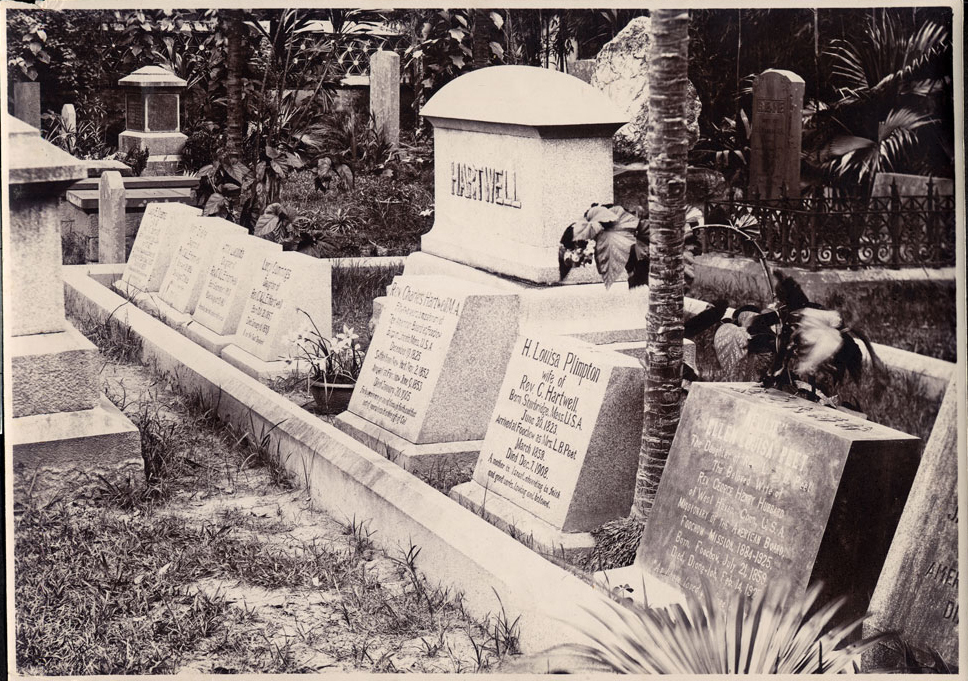
Tomb of Charles Hartwell

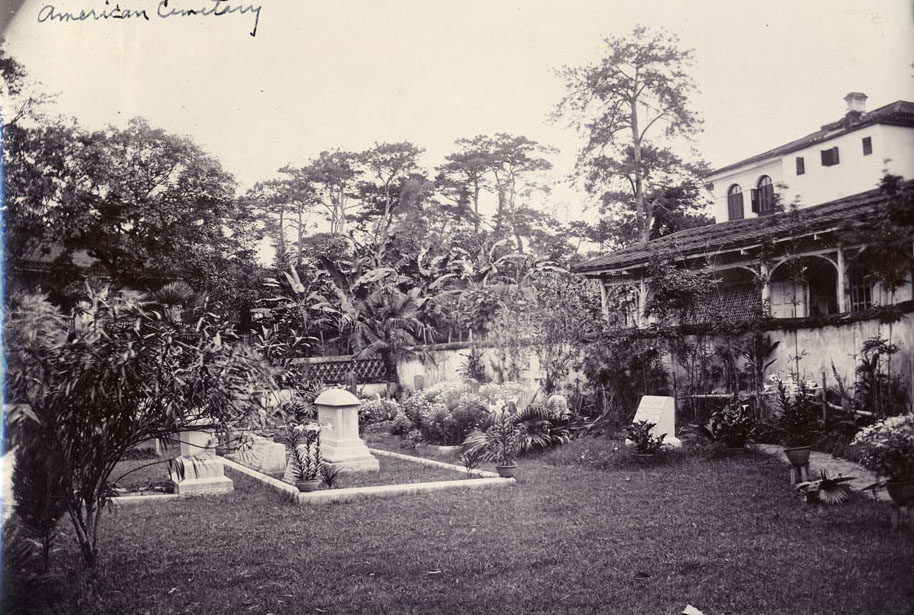
American Cemetery
