= Bishop of Victoria =

Anglican ordinary bishops for area including Hong Kong and South China

The Bishop of Victoria, Hong Kong was (from 1849 to 1951) the Ordinary of a corporation sole including Hong Kong and South China that ministered to 20,000 Anglicans.

== Bishops ==
- 1849 – 1865 (ret.): George Smith
- 1867 – 1872 (res.): Charles Alford (later a Vicar in England)
- 1874 – 1897 (ret.): John Burdon (returned to missionary service)
- 1898 – 1906 (d.): Joseph Hoare
- 1907 – 1920 (res.): Gerard Lander (later Assistant Bishop of St Albans)
- 1920 – 1932 (res.): Ridley Duppuy (later Assistant Bishop of Worcester)
- 1932 – 1951: Ronald Hall (became the first Bishop of Hong Kong and Macao)

=== Assistant bishops ===
Among the assistant bishop of the diocese, there were:

- Bishops of Guangzhou: Mok Sau Tsang (former Archdeacon of Canton) from 1935 (consecrated 25 January at the cathedral by Hall), Victor Halward from 1946, and Mo-Yung In from 1950;
- Bishops of Yunnan-Guizhou: Andrew Y. Y. Tsu from 1940
- Quentin Huang was consecrated Bishop of Kunming in 1946, and became first Bishop of Yunkwei upon that diocese's erection in 1948;
- Mo-Yung In was consecrated Bishop of Canton in 1951
- and James C. L. Wong was Bishop of Jesselton from 1960 until his 1965 translation to Taiwan.

== Archdeacons ==
Archdeacons during Ronald Hall's time included: Lee Kau Yan, Archdeacon of Hong Kong from 1946; Tsang Kei Ngok, Archdeacon of Beihan from 1946; Mo-Yung In, of Beihan from 1949; and Chung Yan Laap (John), of Hong Kong from 1965.
