= Vincent Stanton =

Vincent Stanton may refer to:

- Vincent John Stanton, English missionary
- Vincent Henry Stanton, professor of divinity
