= Arthur Dudley Stewart =

British missionary (1877–1953)

Arthur Dudley Stewart 史超域
- Born: 8 October 1877; Fuzhou, China
- Died: 1 October 1953 (aged 75); London, United Kingdom

The Reverend Arthur Dudley Stewart (史超域牧師) (1877–1953) was a British missionary to Hong Kong and the eighth principal of St. Paul's College, Hong Kong.

== Biography ==
=== Early life ===
Arthur Dudley Stewart was born on 8 October 1877 in Fuzhou, China. His father, Rev. Robert Warren Stewart and his mother, Louisa Kathleen Stewart (née Smyly) were both members of well-known Dublin families. They had gone out to Fujian as C.M.S. missionaries in 1875. Arthur spent his early years in Fuzhou and spoke Fuzhou dialect before he learned to speak English.

In 1882, the Stewarts went on furlough, and when they returned to China, Arthur and two young brothers were left in the care of their grandfather, Mr. J.R. Stewart of Gortletteragh, Dunleary (Dún Laoghaire). Here Arthur was brought up, except that, when his parents returned to furlough, he and the other children joined them in England and the family was reunited for a few months. Later the three boys went to Haileybury. When Arthur was sixteen, his parents returned to China for the fourth and last time, taking with them the five younger children.

Then came the unfortunate tragedy of the uprising of the Chinese party, known to foreigners as ‘the vegetarians’. This was a semi-political party, whose aim was mainly anti-government, but partly anti-foreign. This party had few, if any, branches outside the province of Fujian; and even there was not taken seriously either by the authority or by the foreigners. All foreigners were called in to Fuzhou, but after a couple months the provincial governor declared that all trouble was over, and a number of missionaries left the city for a brief holiday. On 1 August 1895, a party of ‘Vegetarians’ attacked and killed fifteen people including Mr and Mrs Stewart and two of their children. The event is known as the Kucheng massacre.

=== Education and training ===
The tragedy of his parents’ death left a deep impression on Arthur. From an early age, he had contemplated on ministry with a possible view to later going out to the mission field, but the loss of his parents made him determined to carry on the work which had been interrupted by their untimely deaths. It would seem that he influenced other members of his family, since four followed his examples at various times.

In 1898, he entered Trinity College, Cambridge where he completed his university and theological training. He was ordained in 1901, becoming curate at St. Paul's Canonbury, North London. Four years later he was accepted as a candidate by the Church Missionary Society and sailed for Hong Kong, accompanied by a younger sister, Kathleen, in November 1905. It would appear strange that Hong Kong should have been selected rather than Fujian, which had not only been the scene of his parents’ work, but also his early home. It seems that the Church Missionary Society at the time considered that there were great possibilities in Hong Kong and South China, which up to then had been somewhat neglected, while Fukien was comparatively well-provided, principally by members of the Dublin University Mission, which had been founded and organised during his last furlough by Robert Stewart, who was himself a T.C.D. man. It was to Hong Kong consequently that Arthur Stewart was sent.

=== Career in Hong Kong ===
After a preliminary period of language study, he was appointed to the Staff of St. Stephen's College, then in its infancy. Kathleen Stewart joined the staff of St. Stephen's Girls College, Hong Kong. The Chinese Church of Hong Kong was still in its initial stage, though Christian work of a sort had been carried on for nearly sixty years by that time. There was but one Chinese church on Hong Kong Island, St. Stephen's in Pokfulam Road. There was, however, a small but enthusiastic group of Chinese Christians scattered throughout the eastern part of the city, and under Stewart's leadership, these used to meet on Sundays in the small chapel in the basement of the Bishop's House. Many of these “catacomb Christians” came from beyond Happy Valley, undertaking a two-hour walk to attend the service and never missing. This congregation extended rapidly and after a year or two outgrew the church. Then services were held out of doors on what was then the Bishop's tennis court; in rainy weather the verandas were used.

Meanwhile, the Parent Committee of the CMS had decided to close down the training school for Chinese catechists which had been started by the Rev. A. Bunbury in 1900, and carried on, by permission of the Bishop, in St. Paul's College, Hong Kong: this venture proved unsuccessful. Bishop Lander then invited the C.M.S. to re-open and take charge of the former school which had been started in the early days of the Colony and had continued to exist spasmodically “by fits and starts” – it had been closed and re-opened at least three times. The C.M.S. gratefully accepted the offer and appointed Arthur as the Headmaster. In September 1909, St. Paul's College was re-opened, the staff compromising of Stewart himself and Thomas Chan. Growth was rapid and further additions were made to the staff - Ho Wing-kin, Lam Tung, Fung Man-sui, Wei Wing-hon, and Wei Wing-yuet, all former students of St. Stephen's College.

The growth of the school coincided with the increase in numbers of the Christians in the Bishop's Chapel, and Stewart conceived the idea of satisfying two needs at the same time. By cutting away the side of the hill west of Glenealy it was possible to erect a building, with classrooms below and a church above. This was completed by the end of 1911, and thus St. Paul's Church came into being. For many years the Church was also used on weekdays as a school chapel.

In its earlier years there was a service in English on Sunday evenings in St. Paul's Church for the benefit of those Chinese, returned students and the like, who now frequented St. John's Cathedral. Here Stewart was at his best. At Government House he was welcomed warmly,

For some years, he continued the double role of headmaster and vicar of the parish. During those years, the school continued to grow. Branch schools of St. Paul's College, Hong Kong were formed in Hollywood Road, at Shau Kei Wan and Aberdeen, and in far-off Rabaul, staffed in every case by Old Paulines. It is not possible to follow the careers of Stewart's students in details.

Stewart carried on his work in Hong Kong for 28 years, for 21 of which he was the headmaster of St. Paul's College, Hong Kong. In 1930, he resigned as headmaster of St. Paul's, and was succeeded in post by his brother Evan George Stewart.

=== Retirement ===
In 1933 he retired from work in Hong Kong, returning to England, where he became vicar of Lyonsdown in New Barnet, London, in succession of his father-in-law, Bishop Gerald Heath Lander. A farewell meeting was given in the City Hall and was addressed by His Excellency the Governor, Sir William Peel. After the war, Stewart travelled with his wife on 1 November 1945 to Hong Kong at the request of the British Red Cross to aid in the rehabilitation of the Chinese, eventually obtaining accommodation at St. Andrew's Vicarage, Kowloon, taking one or two services every Sunday, taking Bible classes and preaching at the Cathedral and St. Paul's church.

On returning to England, he decided he wanted to spend his final years in Hong Kong, and obtained a position teaching high school students and adult education classes at St. Stephen's College, Hong Kong, with his daughter Margaret teaching kindergarten pupils at St. Stephen's Girls' College. In late 1950, he suffered several minor strokes, and was ordered by doctors to return to England, resulting in the final part of the memoirs he had been writing being incomplete. He and his wife Kitty moved to Bournemouth, England, where he assisted in the parish church, but a year later was confined to bed by a major stroke. Stewart died at Whittington Hospital, Highgate Hill, London on 1 October, 1953. His years of successful work in England were recalled by Bishop Sherwood Jones at the moving funeral held in Lyonsdown Church, London.

== Family ==
Stewart's daughter Joan married Arthur Daryl Alexander George "Bill" Mosley at Singapore in 1954, and is mother of the journalist and broadcaster Dr. Michael Mosley.

His daughter Margaret was a teacher at St. Stephen's Girls' College.

All of his siblings decided to follow an educational career in China. Kathleen established St Paul’s Girls’ School and married Ernest William Lunn Martin before dying in a POW camp; Evan, James, Philip and Mildred also worked in education.

Academic offices
Preceded by Gerald Heath Lander	Principal of St. Paul's College, Hong Kong; 1909–1930	Succeeded by Evan George Stewart
