= Nathan Sites =

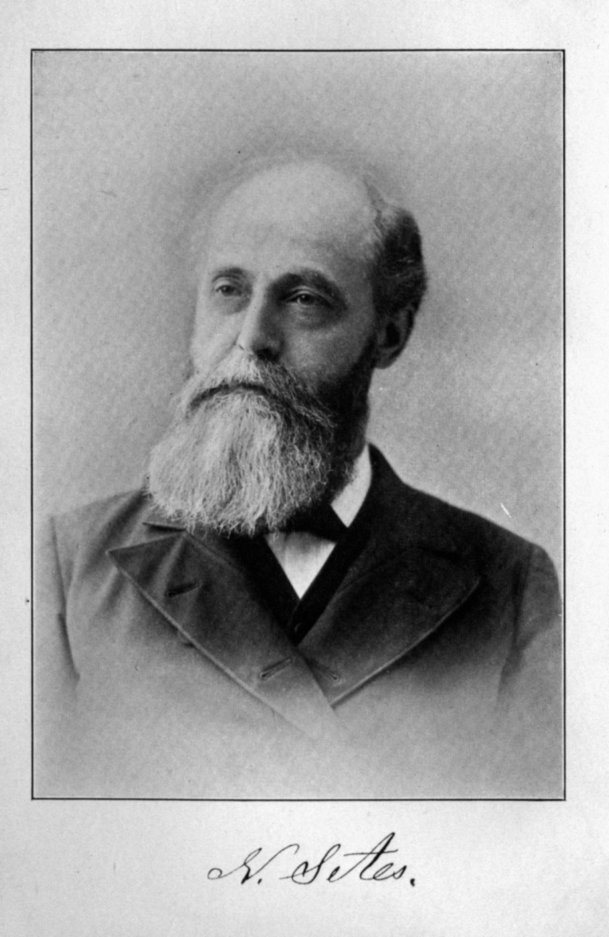
- Missionary to China
- Born: November 6, 1830; Bellville, Richland County, Ohio, United States
- Died: February 10, 1895 (aged 64); Fuzhou, China

Nathan Sites (Chinese: 薛承恩; Pinyin: Xuē Chéng'ēn; Foochow Romanized: Siék Sìng-ŏng; November 6, 1830 – February 10, 1895) was a 19th-century Methodist Episcopal missionary who served in Fuzhou and Yanping (now Nanping), Fujian Province, China.

== Life ==
Rev. Dr. Nathan Sites was born in 1830 at Bellville, Richland County, Ohio, United States of America. He was the son of Robert and Sarah Sites (Fidler). He was graduated from Ohio Wesleyan University in 1859. In 1861, he reached Fuzhou with his wife Sarah Moore Sites to begin his oversea missionary work which would last until his death in 1895. Upon his arrival, Sites chose to live in a countryside hamlet among native villagers to experience the rural life of the Chinese. During his missionary life in China, Sites met with many obstacles: one day while carrying out the reconstruction work of the local church in Yanping, he was brutally beaten by an enraged mob, who left a deep scar on his face. Like other missionaries, Sites argued and labored for the creation of a strong and independent Chinese Church, and in this effort he ordained many of the earliest native Christian ministers like Sia Sek Ong, Wong Nai Siong and the father of Hü King Eng.

In 1895, Rev. Dr. Nathan Sites was buried at Foochow Mission Cemetery (洋墓亭), Fuzhou, Fujian Province. His tombstone is one of three that still exist in the Cang Shan District Museum in Fuzhou.

Sites served in Fuzhou for 34 years until his death in 1895. Sites' journals concerning his labor in China were compiled by his wife Sarah into Nathan Sites: An Epic of the East, which was published in 1912.

== Bibliography ==
- Mrs. Sarah Moore Sites (1912). Nathan Sites: An Epic of the East. Fleming H. Revell Company.
