= Geoffrey Lowrey Speak =

English educator (1924 – 2000)

Geoffrey Lowrey Speak 史璧琦
- Occupations: educationist, headmaster

Reverend Geoffrey Lowrey Speak (史璧琦牧師) OBE (6 October 1924 – 13 March 2000) was a British teacher and educationist to Hong Kong. He served as the ninth principal of St. Paul's College, Hong Kong and first headmaster of Island School.

== Biography ==
Rev. Speak, a graduate of Selwyn College, University of Cambridge, served as a teacher at St. Paul's College from 1953 to 1958, he then became the ninth principal of the school for eight years from 1958 to 1968. Speak oversaw the expansion of the school from a few hundred to 2000, and the grand rebuild programme of the Bonham Road Campus of St. Paul's College, Hong Kong. He resigned from St. Paul's College in July 1967 and became the first principal of Island School with government endorsement.

Speak combined the principalship with managing the English Schools Foundation between 1967 and 1971. Speak introduced the "House System" as the basis of pastoral care and for teaching, a system which is still in place today, and as a pioneer of extracurricular activities. Speak retired as the Secretary of English Schools Foundation in 1984 and returned to England thereafter.

Academic offices
Preceded by Evan George Stewart	Principal of St. Paul's College, Hong Kong; 1958–1967	Succeeded by Timothy Ha
