= Charles Alford =

Anglican bishop and author

Alford in the late 19th century

Charles Richard Alford (13 August 1816 – 13 June 1898) was an Anglican bishop and author in the last third of the 19th century.

Alford was born into an ecclesiastical family in Somerset, England, on 13 August 1816. His father was the rector of West Quantoxhead. He was educated at St Paul's School, London and Trinity College, Cambridge. He was ordained deacon in 1839 and priest a year later at Lincoln Cathedral. He served curacies at Holy Trinity, Finningley and St Matthew's Rugby. Alford married Sarah Jacosha Fleet at St Margaret Pattens in the City of London, on 20 July 1840.

In 1846 he became Vicar of Christ Church, Doncaster, a post he held for eight years. He was then Principal of Highbury Training College for a decade then vicar of Holy Trinity, Islington. He was ordained and consecrated to the episcopate at Canterbury Cathedral on the Feast of the Purification (2 February 1867), by Charles Longley, Archbishop of Canterbury; to serve as the second Bishop of Victoria. The Alfords left England on 29 July 1867 and arrived in Hong Kong on 8 October 1867. Between September and December 1868 Alford made pastoral visits to the newly established treaty ports of Japan, arriving in Yokohama on the 24th of November just in time to witness the procession of the Meiji Emperor as the Imperial capital was relocated from Kyoto to Edo.

After resigning his episcopate and returning to England in 1872 (he had resigned before he was appointed to Bowden, Cheshire in April 1872); he held further incumbencies at Christ Church, Claughton, Merseyside and St Mary's Kippington. From 1880 until his retirement in 1881 he was a commissary to the Diocese of Huron. He died on 13 June 1898.

== Works ==
- First Principles of the Oracles of God, 1856
- Charge to Diocese of Victoria, with Review of Missions to China and Japan, 1871
- Standfast, 1895
- Collected Sermons, 1899 (posthumous publication)

Religious titles
Preceded by George Smith	Bishop of Victoria, Hong Kong; 1867–1872	Succeeded by John Shaw Burdon
Academic offices
Preceded by George Smith	Principal and Warden of St. Paul's College, Hong Kong; 1867–1871	Succeeded by John Shaw Burdon
