= Szeto Wai =

Hong Kong engineer and architect

Szeto Wai CBE, JP
- 司徒惠

Unofficial Member of the Executive Council of Hong Kong
- In office 1 July 1972 – 1976
- Appointed by: Sir Murray MacLehose

Unofficial Member of the Legislative Council of Hong Kong
- In office 19 August 1964 – 19 June 1974
- Appointed by: Sir David Trench

Personal details
- Born: 10 April 1913 Kwantung, Republic of China
- Died: 24 July 1991 (aged 78) Paris, France
- Children: 4
- Education: St. Paul's College, Hong Kong; St. John's University, Shanghai
- Occupation: Engineer and architect

Szeto Wai, CBE, JP (Chinese: 司徒惠; 10 April 1913 – 24 July 1991) was a Hong Kong engineer and architect. He was responsible for the design and construction of many buildings of the Chinese University of Hong Kong when he was the university architect from 1963 to 1978, and became known as the "constructor of the CUHK". He was also an unofficial member of the Executive Council and the Legislative Council.

== Retirement, death and personal life ==
Szeto Wai resided in New York City after his retirement in 1987. He died on 24 July 1991 in Paris, France.
