= Paul Lin =

Paul Lin Ziyang (Traditional Chinese: 林子揚, born December 10, 1971) is a writer, composer and head of a political discussion online forum in Hong Kong. He currently hosts a programme, Headline (頭條新聞), on Radio Television Hong Kong. He is also a Christian and belongs to the Christian and Missionary Alliance.

He was educated in St. Paul's College and graduated from Chinese University of Hong Kong. In the 1990s, he composed more than 60 songs for the TV programmes of TVB and for singers such as Sammi Cheng. Since the 2000s, he started to compose satirical songs about politics. Besides, he is currently a piano teacher and a columnist of Apple Daily. He also wrote a book called "If One Country no Two System then there is no Hong Kong 一國沒兩制便沒有新香港" in 2004. He helped a Christian organization to record the songs in the Sharing Hymns (共享詩歌) in 2005.

== Selected works ==
- 2003, Democratic Party Theme (民主怎可擋)
- 2003, Atypical Rubbish (非典型廢柴)
- 2003, Song of Old Mrs Tung (懵太主題曲)
