= George Smith (bishop of Victoria) =

Anglican missionary and bishop in China

- Bishop of Victoria
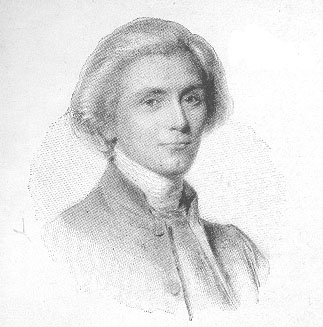
- Diocese: Victoria (Hong Kong)
- In office: 1849–1865 (retired)
- Successor: Charles Alford
- Other posts: Warden, St Paul's Missionary College, Hong Kong

Orders
- Ordination: 1839 (deacon); 1840 (priest)
- Consecration: 29 May 1849 by John Bird Sumner

Personal details
- Born: 19 June 1815 Wellington, Somerset, Great Britain
- Died: 14 December 1871 (aged 56) Blackheath, Kent, Great Britain
- Denomination: Anglican

George Smith (Chinese: 施美夫; 19 June 1815 – 14 December 1871) was a missionary in China and the Bishop of Victoria (the Anglican bishop in Hong Kong) from 1849 to 1865, the first of this newly established diocese.

== Life ==
Smith was born in Wellington, Somerset on 19 June 1815. He obtained a Bachelor of Arts (BA) in classics from Magdalen Hall, Oxford in 1837 (and a Master of Arts {MA Cantab} in 1843 and Doctor of Divinity {DD} in 1849) and was ordained in the Church of England. He was made deacon on 20 October 1839 by George Davys, Bishop of Peterborough and ordained priest in July 1840 by Charles Longley, Bishop of Ripon. He rapidly became involved in the Church Missionary Society and he and fellow priest Thomas McClatchie arrived in Shanghai on 25 September 1844 to establish a mission. Poor health forced an early return to England, but Smith's Narrative of his period in China was published in 1847.

Smith worked hard to raise money for further missionary work in China, and in 1849 was made bishop of the new diocese of Victoria, Hong Kong and warden of the newly founded St Paul's Missionary College (see St Paul's College). He was consecrated a bishop on 29 May 1849 at Canterbury Cathedral, by John Bird Sumner, Archbishop of Canterbury. With his new wife Lydia, née Brandram, Smith arrived in Hong Kong on 29 March 1850 and threw himself into missionary and educational work. He learned Mandarin, becoming sufficiently fluent to conduct services in it.

Smith was also responsible for missionary work in China and Japan. A weak constitution limited this work, but he nevertheless visited Japan (1860), the Ryukyu islands (1850), India and Ceylon (1852–1853), Australia (1859), and elsewhere, partly to work for emigrants from China.

Smith had a misinformed sympathy on religious grounds for the Taiping rebel movement in the neighbouring Chinese Empire. In 1853 he wrote in letter to Archbishop Sumner: "The rebel chiefs profess to believe in Protestant Christianity; declare that they are commissioned by the Almighty to spread the knowledge of the one true God; have everywhere shown a determination to destroy idolatry of every kind; and now profess to await a further revelation of the divine will, ere they advance upon the northern capital Peking". He was still sympathetic as late as 1863, when he protested to the Foreign Secretary (then Earl Russell), without checking his facts, over Hong Kong newspaper reports on the killing of Taiping prisoners in Taintsan by followers of the Ever Victorious Army who were under command of Charles George Gordon (but done without his knowledge). At that stage he considered the Taiping sincere if somewhat heretical Christians, and he was supported by a strong lobby of merchants in Hong Kong who profited from supplying the rebels.

Smith left Hong Kong for the last time in 1864, retiring from the bishopric early the next year. He had arrived back in Britain by St Peter's Day (29 June 1864), when he presented Charles Bromby for consecration as a bishop at Canterbury Cathedral. Over the following years, he occasionally assisted successive Bishops of Winchester (Sumner and Wilberforce at least) in north Surrey (what is now South London). He died in his house at Blackheath (then in Kent, now in Greater London), on 14 December 1871 after a short illness.

== Books by Smith ==
- George Smith (Bishop of Victoria (Hong Kong)) (1854). China, Her Future and Her Past: ... a charge delivered on Oct. 20, 1853. London: Thomas Hatchard.
- George Smith (1861). 10 Weeks in Japan. Longman, Green, Longman, & Roberts.
- George Smith (1848). The Case of Our West-African Cruisers and West-African Settlements Fairly Considered. London: J. Hatchard & Son.
- Lewchew and the Lewchewans: Being a narrative of a visit to Lewchew or Loo Choo, in October, 1850. London, 1853. About the Ryukyu Islands. (Also available here.)
- Our national relations with China: Being two speeches delivered in Exeter Hall and in the Free-Trade Hall, Manchester. London, 1857.
- Smith, George (1847). A narrative of an exploratory visit to each of the consular cities of China, and to the islands of Hong Kong and Chusan, in behalf of the Church Missionary Society, in the years 1844, 1845, 1846. London: Seeley. [digitized by University of Hong Kong Libraries, Digital Initiatives, "China Through Western Eyes." ]

== Sources ==
- Bickley, Gillian. "George Smith (1815–1871)." Oxford Dictionary of National Biography 51:124–125.

Religious titles
New diocese	Bishop of Victoria; 1849–1865	Succeeded by Charles Alford
Academic offices
Preceded by Vincent John Stanton; Founder	Principal and Warden of St Paul's College; 1851–1864	Succeeded by Charles Alford
