= Gerard Lander =

Anglican bishop (1861–1934)

Gerald Lander
- 倫義華
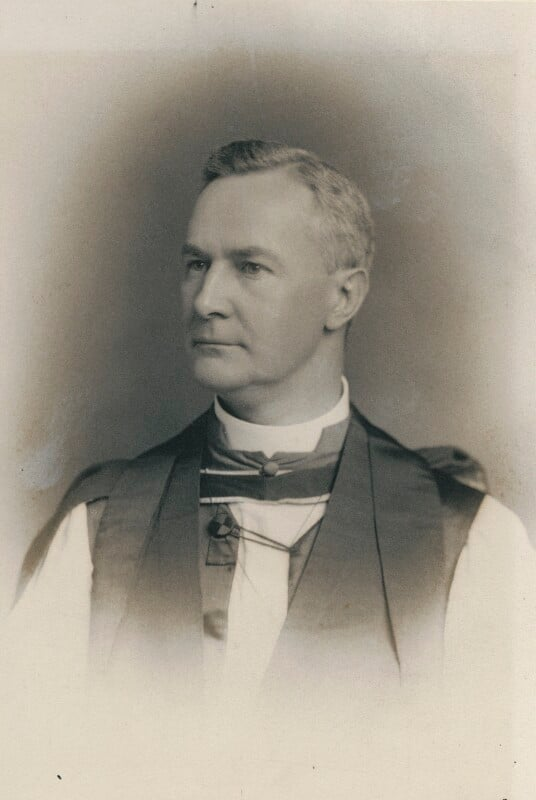
- Lander in the 1900s
- Born: 14 August 1861
- Died: 14 November 1934 (aged 73); King's Cross Station, London
- Occupations: Bishop of Victoria, Hong Kong, Principal of St. Paul's College, Hong Kong

Gerard Heath Lander (sometimes Gerald; sometimes Heath-Lander; 14 August 1861 – 14 November 1934) was Anglican Bishop of Victoria, Hong Kong and the 7th Principal of St. Paul's College, Hong Kong.

He was born on 14 August 1861, the son of John Gerard Heath Lander of Bishops Offley Manor, Staffordshire, and Sarah, the daughter of Thomas Jones of Tibberton, Shropshire. He was educated at Newport, Shropshire, and at Trinity College, Cambridge. He was made deacon in Advent 1884 (21 December), by J. C. Ryle, Bishop of Liverpool, at St Peter's Pro-Cathedral, Liverpool; and ordained priest in 1885; and initially served as a Curate at St Bride, Liverpool. He then held incumbencies at St Benedict, Everton; St Philip, Litherland; and St Cyprian, Liverpool before being appointed to the episcopate in 1907 as the fifth Bishop of Victoria, Hong Kong a post he held for 13 years. He was consecrated a bishop on St Peter's Day 1907 (29 June), by Randall Davidson, Archbishop of Canterbury, at Lambeth Parish Church. He held the post of Principal of St. Paul's College, Hong Kong from 1906-1909, when he was succeeded by his to be son-in-law, the Rev. Arthur Dudley Stewart. By May 1920, he had "signified his intention of resigning his see [that] year"; he must have done so before his successor's consecration on 24 June. On his return to England he was Vicar of Holy Trinity, New Barnet (until 1933); Archdeacon of Bedford (1933 onwards); and an Assistant Bishop of St Albans (1924 onwards). He died on 14 November 1934, aged 73, collapsing suddenly at King's Cross Station.

Anglican Communion titles
| Preceded by Joseph Hoare | Bishop of Victoria; 1907–1920 | Succeeded by Ridley Duppuy |
| Preceded by Arthur Parnell | Archdeacon of Bedford; 1933–1934 | Succeeded by William Robins |
| Preceded by Joseph Hoare | Principal of St. Paul's College, Hong Kong; 1906–1909 | Succeeded by Arthur Dudley Stewart |
