= Ernest William Lunn Martin =

British missionary (d. 1980)

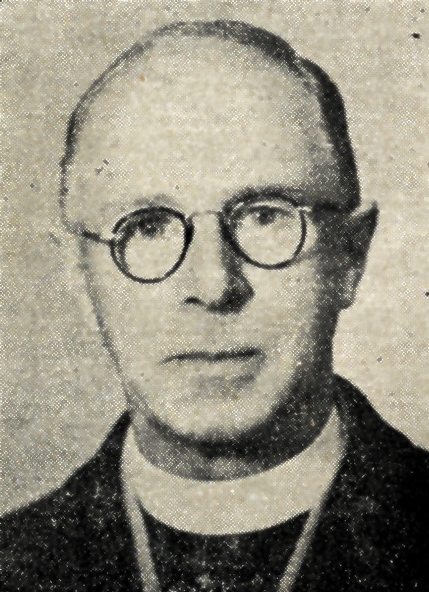
Rev Canon E W L Martin

Ernest William Lunn Martin MBE (September 8, 1888 – February 19, 1980) was a British religious missionary, educator, and author. He worked in Hong Kong at St Stephen's College and St John's College, serving as chaplain and warden. He was also canon at St John's Cathedral. He is the namesake of Martin Hostel at St. Stephen's College.

== Early life and family ==
Martin was born in Stockton-on-Tees to Henry Martin and Mary Lunn. He had 9 siblings (5 brothers and 4 sisters). His father was a priest as well as brothers Herbert Craven Martin who served a mission in India. His sister Ellen Mary Martin became a midwife and lived in Canton China. Sister Ethel Martin lived in India and South Africa. His brother Richard Martin who worked in Canton, China.

On July 12, 1921, he married Kathleen Stewart, A. D. Stewart's sister and daughter of Robert Warren Stewart. Kathleen Stewart was a survivor of the Kucheng massacre in 1895. Kathleen Stewart She died while interned with Martin in a POW camp January 19, 1945.

In 1970 he married Mei Ling Leung (or Meiling Leung) at St John's Cathedral.

=== Education ===
Martin attended Middlesbrough High School. He was then Assistant Master at Milton Abbey School from 1907 to 1908. He received a BA in theological tripos at Clare College, Cambridge (1911).

== Career ==
Martin went on a Church Missionary Society (CMS) mission to the South China Mission in Canton in 1914. He became chaplain of St Stephen's College in Hong Kong that same year. In 1916-1917, he became the acting warden at St John's College. Martin returned to England in 1917 to serve as a lieutenant in the Labour Corps until 1920.

In 1920-1921, he once again became the acting warden at St John's College. Martin went back to England in 1923 and returned to Hong Kong in 1924. In 1925-1926, he was the acting warden of St John's College for a third time, and in 1926 he became the acting warden of St Stephen's College. He was appointed warden of St Stephen's College in 1928, and held this position until 1953. In the 1920s, he oversaw the relocation of the college to its present day site and the opening of the School House, Great Hall, the Hostel (later renamed for Martin), and the Science building. He also went to England in 1928 and returned to Hong Kong in 1929.

Martin went to England and back to Hong Kong in 1933-1934 and 1939. During this time he was listed as the Vicar of Earls Colne a village in Essex UK.

In 1941, Martin was appointed canon of St John's Cathedral. Later that year, he helped defend St Stephen's College during the St Stephen's College massacre (December 25, 1941, at the end of the Battle of Hong Kong). Martin and his wife were initially erroneously reported in Ireland as killed in the battle in Hong Kong. The battle led to the closure of the school and the conversion of the campus into the Stanley Internment Camp where Martin and his wife with 2800 other civilian prisoners were held. His wife died in the Internment Camp on January 19, 1945. He went to England in 1945 and returned to Hong Kong in 1946. The college reopened in 1946.

Martin went to England and came back to the South China Mission in 1952. The next year, he went to Malaya. He went to England and then Hong Kong in 1956. He also became the chaplain of St John's College in 1956 and held this position until his death.

== Legacy ==
After Martin retired on October 21, 1959, he continued to work in Hong Kong.

In 1977, he received an Order of the British Empire award for his service in the 1978 New Year Honours. He was a Member of the Order of the British Empire (MBE), the lowest of the 5 classes in the Order.

Martin is remembered for his service within education and community welfare, which spanned more than half a century. Martin Hostel at St Stephen's College is named after him.

=== Publications ===
- A Wanderer in the West Country about the West country of England was published by Phoenix House, London in 1951.
- The New Spirit originally published in 1946 by Dobson Press. Subsequent editions were published in 1970(Folcroft Press), 1977(Folcroft Library Edition), and 1978(Norwood Edition).
