= Joseph Hoare (bishop of Victoria) =

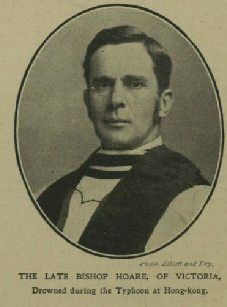
Joseph Hoare Bishop of Victoria

Joseph Charles Hoare (15 November 1851 – 18 September 1906) was the Anglican Bishop of Victoria, Hong Kong from 1898 to 1906.

== Life and ministry ==
Hoare was born in Ramsgate on 15 November 1851. His father was the Revd Edward Hoare, an honorary canon of Canterbury Cathedral. He was educated at Tonbridge School and Trinity College, Cambridge.

Hoare was ordained in 1875 and was a curate at Holy Trinity Church in Tunbridge Wells. After this he was principal of the Church Missionary Society (CMS) training college in Ningbo from 1878 to 1898.

Hoare married his first cousin, Alice Julian Patteson on 14 December 1882 at Thorpe-next-Norwich. Alice died in 1883.

Hoare later married Ellen Gough, daughter of Frederick Foster Gough; they had six children.

Hoare's last post was as Bishop of Victoria, Hong Kong and the Warden of St. Paul's College, Hong Kong, to which he was appointed in 1898. He was consecrated a bishop on the Feast of St Barnabas 1898 (11 June), at St Paul's Cathedral by Frederick Temple, Archbishop of Canterbury.

Trinity College, Cambridge, honoured him with the Doctor of Divinity (DD) degree on 18 January 1900.

On 18 September 1906, Hoare and four St Paul's College students were drowned amidst a typhoon during a preaching journey in Castle Peak, Tuen Mun.

== Sources ==
A. R. Buckland, rev. H. C. G. Matthew. "Hoare, Joseph Charles (1851–1906)". Oxford Dictionary of National Biography (online ed.). Oxford University Press. doi:10.1093/ref:odnb/33896. (Subscription, Wikipedia Library access or UK public library membership required.)

Religious titles
Preceded by John Shaw Burdon	Bishop of Victoria, Hong Kong; 1898–1906	Succeeded by Gerald Heath Lander
Academic offices
Preceded by John Shaw Burdon	Principal of St. Paul's College, Hong Kong; 1898–1906	Succeeded by Gerald Heath Lander
