= High School Affiliated to Shanghai Jiao Tong University =

- 上海交通大学附属中学

Location
- 42 Yingao Rd; Baoshan, Shanghai; People's Republic of China
- Coordinates: 31.3197°N 121.4890°E

Information
- Type: State-owned
- Motto: 饮水思源，爱国荣校
- Established: 1954
- Teaching staff: 119
- Gender: Co-educational
- Enrollment: approx. 1500
- Colours: Red
- Affiliations: Shanghai Jiao Tong University
- Website: jdfz.cn

High School Affiliated to Shanghai Jiao Tong University (上海交通大学附属中学) is public secondary school in Shanghai, China. The school is co-supervised by the Shanghai City Education Committee and Shanghai Jiao Tong University.
