= John Burdon (bishop) =

British bishop

John Shaw Burdon
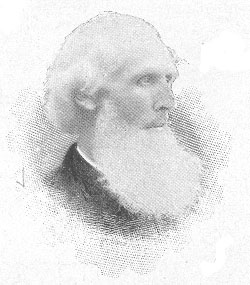
- Missionary to China
- Born: 12 December 1826; Glasgow, Scotland
- Died: 5 January 1907 (aged 80); Royston, Hertfordshire, England

John Burdon
- Traditional Chinese: 包爾騰
- Simplified Chinese: 包尔腾
Transcriptions
Standard Mandarin
- Hanyu Pinyin: Bāo'ěrténg
- Wade–Giles: Pao'erht'eng
- Yale Romanization: Bāu'ěrténg
- IPA: [páʊˈàɚtʰə̌ŋ]
Yue: Cantonese
- Yale Romanization: Bāau yíh tàhng
- Jyutping: Baau1 ji5 tang4
- IPA: [páːuji̬ːtɐ̏ŋ]

John Shaw Burdon (simplified Chinese: 包尔腾; traditional Chinese: 包爾騰; 1826 – 5 January 1907) was a British Christian missionary to China with the Church Mission Society who in time became a bishop.

== Life ==
Burdon was ordained to the priesthood by the Bishop of London in December 1852; and resigned in 1896. He opposed Britain's part in the Anglo-Chinese First and Second Opium Wars. He was consecrated a bishop on 15 March 1874, by John Jackson, Bishop of London, at Lambeth Parish Church; to serve the South China diocese of the Anglican Church in Victoria and Hong Kong. Burdon was a translator with Samuel Isaac Joseph Schereschewsky of the Book of Common Prayer. He resigned his See "a few months" before December 1897.

Burdon was a friend and fellow travelling evangelist of the young Hudson Taylor. He married Harriet Ann, whom he lost to illness in 1854 in Shanghai. His second marriage in 1857 was to Burella Hunter Dyer, the daughter of missionary Rev.Samuel Dyer. She died the following year of cholera, also in Shanghai. His third wife also predeceased him. Burdon is fluent in Shanghainese. In April 1855, Burdon and Hudson Taylor stationed in Chongming Island, adjacent to Shanghai. When they preached, Hudson Taylor spoke first in Mandarin, then Burton interpreted into Shanghainese, which is native to the island.

The school, named Tong Wen Guan, was officially opened on 11 June 1862 and Burdon was hired as the first English instructor.

He died at Bedford on 5 January 1907, and was buried at Royston.

== Family ==
Burdon was married three times: first, to Harriet Anne Forshaw on 30 March 1853, who died at Shanghai on 26 September 1854; second, to Burella Hunter Dyer, on 11 November 1857, who died on 16 Aug. 1858; third, to Phoebe Esther, daughter of E. T. Alder, vicar of Bungay on 14 June 1865. She died on 14 June 1898; they had three sons.

== Bibliography ==
- Old Testament Manual
- Christian Joy: A Sermon, Preached in the London Mission Chapel, Shanghai, 25 November 1858, the Last Thursday in the Month, Usually Observed in the United States of America as Thanksgiving Day (1858)
- The Chinese Term for God: A Letter to the Protestant Missionaries of China (1877)
- Colloquial Versions of the Chinese Scriptures: A Paper to be read at the Shanghai Missionary Conference (1890)

== Notes ==
Academic offices
Preceded by Charles Richard Alford	Principal of St. Paul's College, Hong Kong; 1874–1897	Succeeded by Joseph Charles Hoare
