= Vincent John Stanton =

British missionary (1817–1891)

Vincent John Stanton 史丹頓
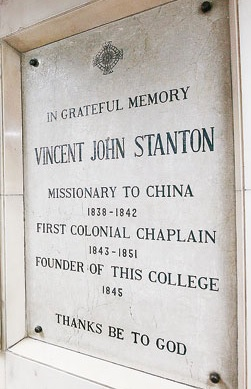
- First Colonial Chaplain of Hong Kong
- Born: Bristol
- Baptised: 27 September 1817
- Died: 16 May 1891; Nice, France
- Occupations: Educator, Headmaster

Vincent John Stanton (Chinese: 史丹頓牧師; 27 September 1817 – 16 May 1891) was an English missionary of the Church Missionary Society to Hong Kong. He served as the first colonial chaplain of Hong Kong, and founded St. John's Cathedral and St. Paul's College in Hong Kong.

== Biography ==
Stanton was born in Bristol in 1817, the son of Daniel and Elizabeth Stanton. He was educated at St John's College, Cambridge.

When the British first began to settle in Hong Kong in 1842, there were few who believed that the place would prosper and grow into a great city, and there were few who were willing to plan for the needs of a permanent population. One of the few was the Reverend Vincent Stanton, who was one of the first arrivals in Hong Kong and became the first colonial Chaplain. He envisioned that one day, Hong Kong would serve as an important role in China's future. He wanted a permanent church as a place of worship for the community he believed would develop.

Stanton arrived in Hong Kong in 1843, when he was still an undergraduate at Cambridge. He set about giving substance to his reams. He persuaded the Government to grant him land and convinced business houses and churches in Britain to supply £6000 to build a new church in Hong Kong. In less than ten years after the establishment of Hong Kong, there was a church about 300 yards north east of Government House and a school about the same distance west. The church was to become St. John's Cathedral and still stands on the same spot. St. Paul's College lasted a hundred years on its original site, but today only the house built for the warden remains, now known as Bishop's House, for the first Bishop of Hong Kong was made warden of the College and began a very close relationship between Bishop and St. Paul's College.

When Stanton became ill in 1850, he departed Hong Kong for Europe. The Bishop of Victoria there then became the ex-officio warden of the college.

== Personal life ==
He was married to Lucy Ann Head on March 1843, and sailed together for Hong Kong in June of the same year. Lucy would go onto found the first Church of England Sunday School and Infant School in Whitechapel and Stepney.

Academic offices
Preceded by Founder	Principal of St. Paul's College, Hong Kong; 1849–1850	Succeeded by George Smith
