= Kucheng massacre =

1895 massacre in Fujian, China

Coordinates: 26°37′24″N 118°51′29″E

Kucheng Massacre
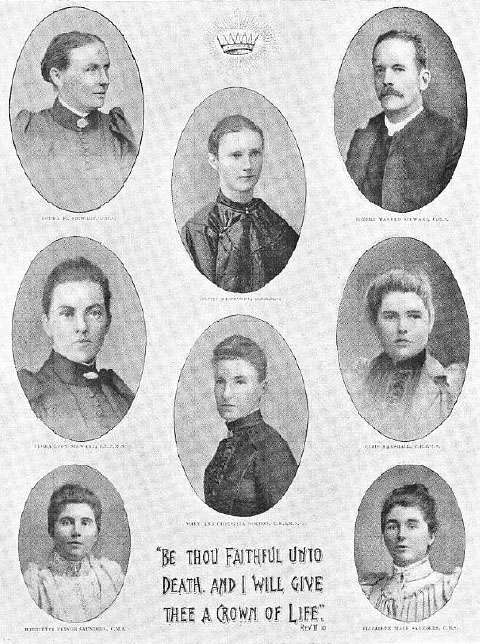
- Some of the victims of the Kucheng Massacre
- Location: Gutian Huashan, Gutian County, Fujian, China
- Date: 1 August 1895
- Target: Western Christians, primarily British missionaries
- Attack type: Massacre
- Weapons: Spears and swords
- Deaths: 11
- Injuries: Several
- Perpetrator: Luoist fasting folk religious group
- Motive: Anti-missionary sentiment

The Kucheng massacre (Chinese: 古田敎案; Pinyin: Gǔtián Jiào'àn; Foochow Romanized: Kŭ-chèng Gáu-áng) was a massacre of Western Christians that took place at Gutian (at that time known in the west as Kucheng), Fujian, China on August 1, 1895.

At dawn of that day, a Luoist fasting folk religious group attacked British missionaries who were then taking summer holidays at Gutian Huashan, killing eleven people and destroying two houses. The Kucheng Massacre is considered one of the worst attacks against foreigners in China prior to the Boxer Movement in 1899–1901, the only comparable event in China's missionary history being the Tianjin Massacre in 1870.

== Background ==
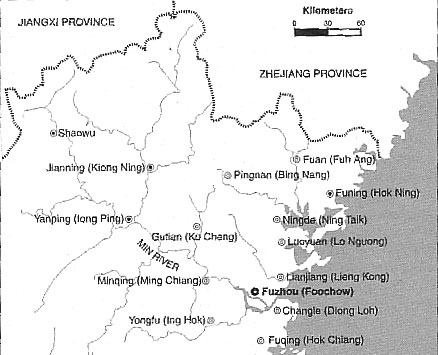
Location of Gutian as centered in the map of northern Fujian

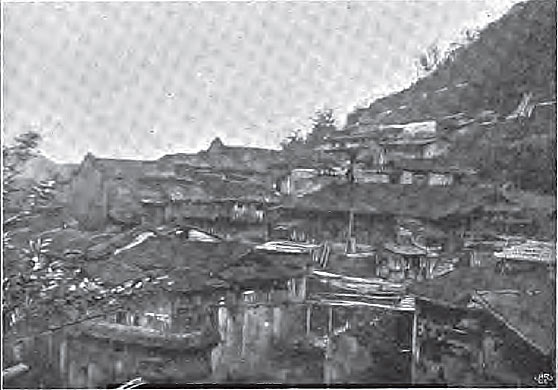
Hwasang Mountain Village, where the massacre occurred

In 1892, a religious movement called zhaijiao ("fasting school", so called because their followers took vows of vegetarianism) began assuming the functions of government due to the decrepit condition of Qing dynasty government in the Gutian region. They resolved disputes between villagers, banned opium, and ended the local practice of selling wives to multiple husbands. Gutian police decided not to intervene in this displacement of the functions of government. Christian missionaries were unhappy with these circumstances and asked the provincial officials to send in their own troops. In response, fasting-religion leaders decided to defend their rebellion with violence. The last letter from the murdered English missionary Robert Warren Stewart, dated April 8, describes the critical situation of affairs at Gutian:

Ten days ago we were awakened at 4 o'clock in the morning by a native clergyman who crossed the river in order to bring us the startling news that the Vegetarian rebels were expected at daylight to storm Ku-Cheng. The gateways of the city were being blocked with timber and stone in order to prevent their entry. We had 100 men, women and children in our compound outside the town. We passed a terrible time of suspense until daybreak, when torrents of rain fell, and the Vegetarians, not liking the rain, postponed the attack. All the mission party started to get inside of Ku-Cheng. The male and female staffs, in the early morning, after crossing the river in small parties in a tiny boat, reached Kueseng wall, which was blocked and had to be scaled with ladders. During the three following days bodies of citizens guarded the walls, armed with prongs and rusty swords. On the fourth day the gates were opened and the mandarin in command conferred with the Vegetarian leaders. What occurred during this interview we do not know. But nobody believes we have seen the end of this matter. Such a serious affair cannot be so easily patched up and is probably only begun... All the women and children on the advice of the American and British consuls, will be sent to the coast. The opinion prevails that if the Japo-Chinese treaty is arranged soldiers will be sent from Fu-Chow to arrest the leaders of the rebels. But, if it is not arranged, then the Vegetarians will increase sufficiently to make the rising a success.

== Events ==
On August 1, 1895, at the time of the initial outbreak, the family of Robert W. Stewart and the other ladies were still asleep in their hill village at Gutian Huashan (华山). The Vegetarian mob then broke in, speared the victims to death, and burnt down the houses. Only five persons survived the attack, two of whom were Mr. Stewart's children: one had one knee broken, and the other, a baby, had an eye gouged out. Those murdered at Huashan were:

Robert Warren Stewart	Ireland	Church Missionary Society
Louisa Kathleen Stewart	Ireland	Church Missionary Society
Herbert Stewart	Ireland	(five years old)
Hilda Sylvia Stewart	Ireland	(baby)
Helena Yellop	Ireland	(children's nurse)
Mary Ann Christina ("Annie") Gordon	Australia	Church of England Zenana Missionary Society
Elsie Marshall	England	Church of England Zenana Missionary Society
Hessie Newcombe	Ireland	Church of England Zenana Missionary Society
Harriette Eleanor ("Nellie") Saunders	Australia	Church Missionary Society
Elizabeth Maud ("Topsy") Saunders	Australia	Church Missionary Society
Flora Lucy Stewart	England	Church of England Zenana Missionary Society

== Aftermath ==
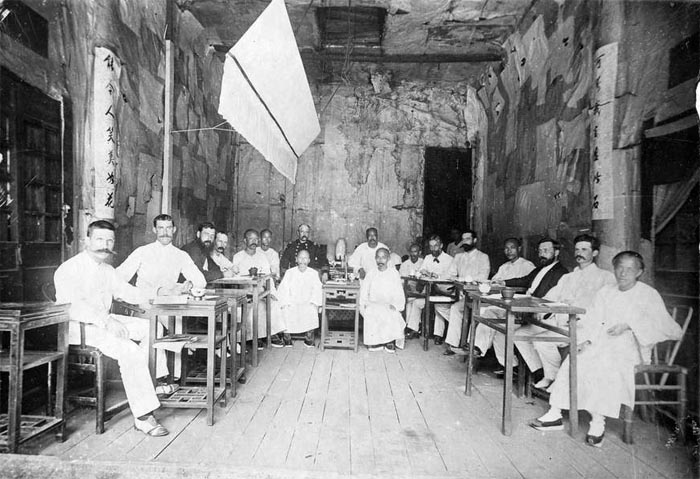
Commission of Enquiry in session following Kucheng Massacre

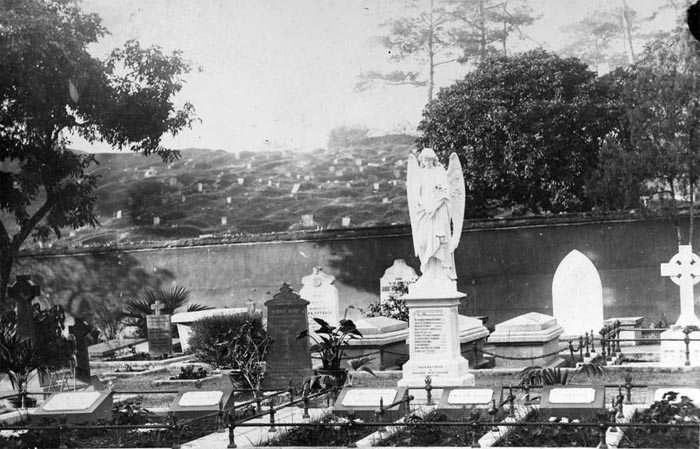
The mission cemetery of Fuzhou where the martyrs of Kucheng Massacre were buried

The Qing government had suppressed the news for three days before an official telegraph was sent out from Shanghai on August 4. Western countries strongly condemned China for its connivance with the brutality and indignantly urged the guilty be punished. Under the pressure of foreign military force, the Qing government appointed a Commission of Enquiry consisting of both Chinese officials and British diplomats. All principals were soon executed, and other accessories were either banished or sentenced to life imprisonment. The supervisor of Gutian county Wang Rulin (王汝霖) was also dismissed from office.

Stephen Livingston Baldwin, Secretary of the Methodist Episcopal Missionary Society in China, commented on the massacre in an interview from New York Times:

I do not know the cause of the riot. It is only a matter of conjecture. It was a local affair, and of no general significance, and was occasioned by some evil-disposed persons. Another element that entered into it is the disturbed feeling in the country owing to the Japanese victories. There is a general feeling of unrest.

The newspapers also recommended that "Great Britain and the United States ... combine to teach the Chinese a lesson that will cause foreigners to be respected forever".

The bodies of the victims were buried at the mission cemetery of Fuzhou.

== See also ==
- Anti-missionary riots in China
- List of massacres in China
- Church of England Zenana Missionary Society
- Protestant missions in China - Women missionaries
