= List of Anglican churches in Hong Kong =

The list of Anglican churches in Hong Kong is as follows:

== Diocese of Hong Kong Island ==
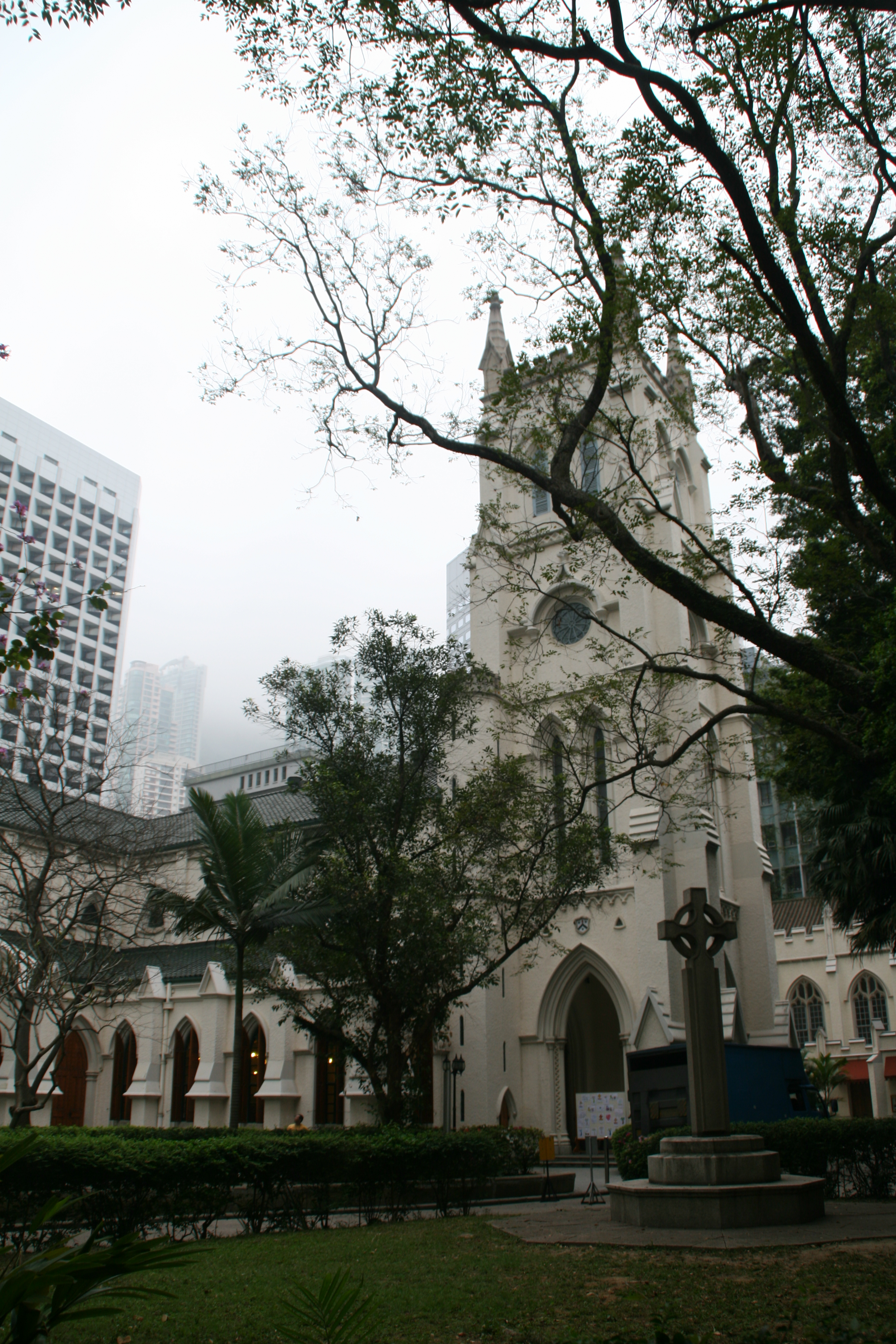
St. John's Cathedral

=== Parishes ===
- Holy Nativity Church
- St. Peter's Church, North Point
- St. Mary's Church
- St. James' Church
- St. John's Cathedral
- St. Paul's Church
- St. Matthew's Church
- St. Stephen's Church
- St. Luke's Church

=== Missions ===
- St. Timothy's Church
- Grace Church
- Church of the Incarnation
- Church of the Ascension
- Discovery Bay Church (Missionary church of St. John's Cathedral)
- St. Stephen's Chapel (Missionary church of St. John's Cathedral)
- Emmanuel Church (Missionary church of St. John's Cathedral)

=== Chapels ===
- Chapel of Christ of the King

== Diocese of Eastern Kowloon ==
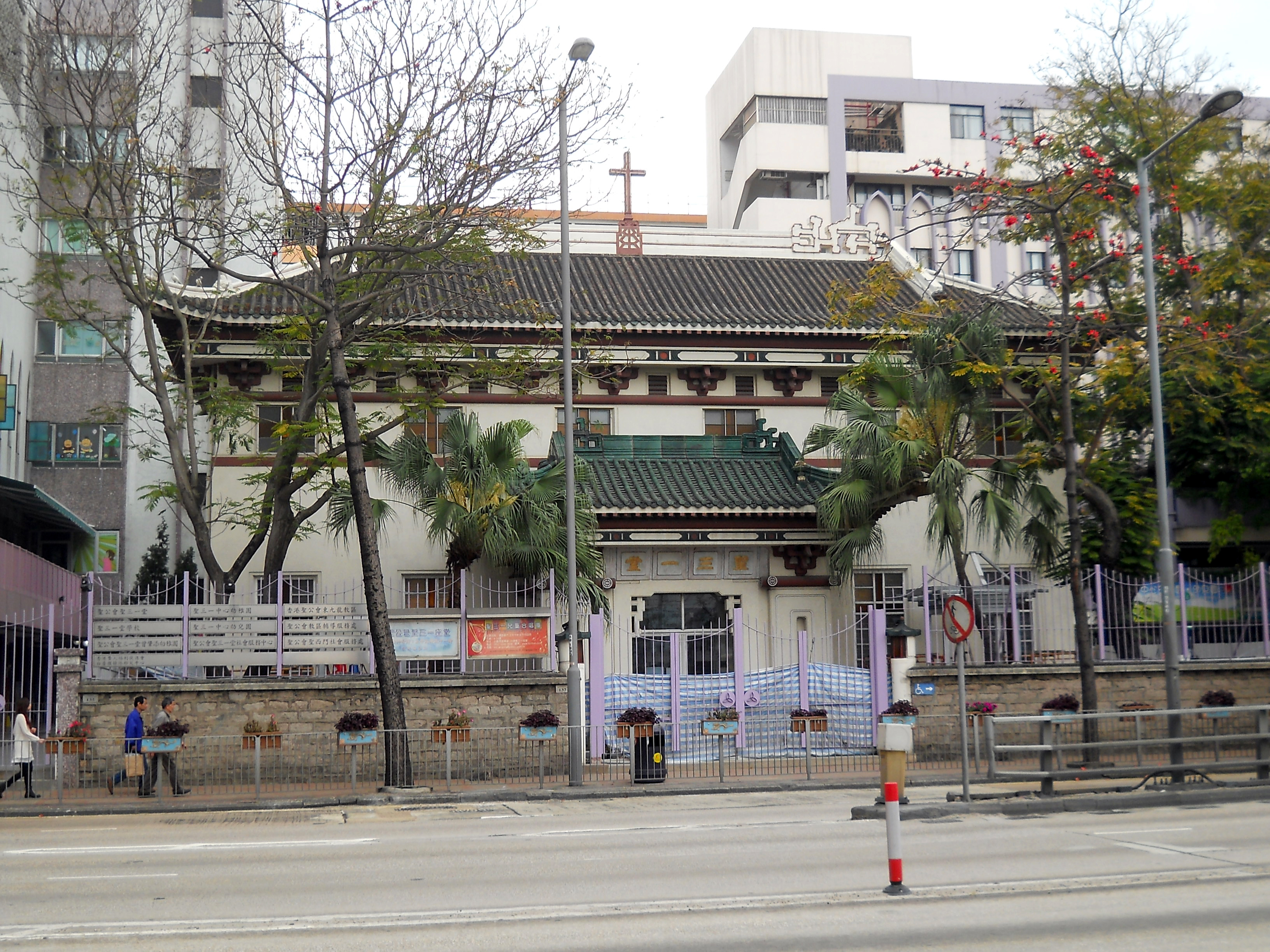
Holy Trinity Cathedral

=== Parishes ===
- Holy Trinity Cathedral
- Christ Church
- Holy Carpenter Church
- Church of the Good Shepherd
- St. Mark's Church
- Calvary Church
- St. Barnabas' Church
- Kindly Light Church
- Holy Spirit Church
- Church of St. John the Baptist
- Church of the Holy Word

=== Missions ===
- Church of Our Saviour
- St. Titus' Church
- Holy Wisdom Church
- Resurrection Church
- Shatin Anglican Church
- The Church of The Magnificat
- Kei Lok Church
- Church of the Transfiguration
- St. Augustine's Chapel

== Diocese of Western Kowloon ==
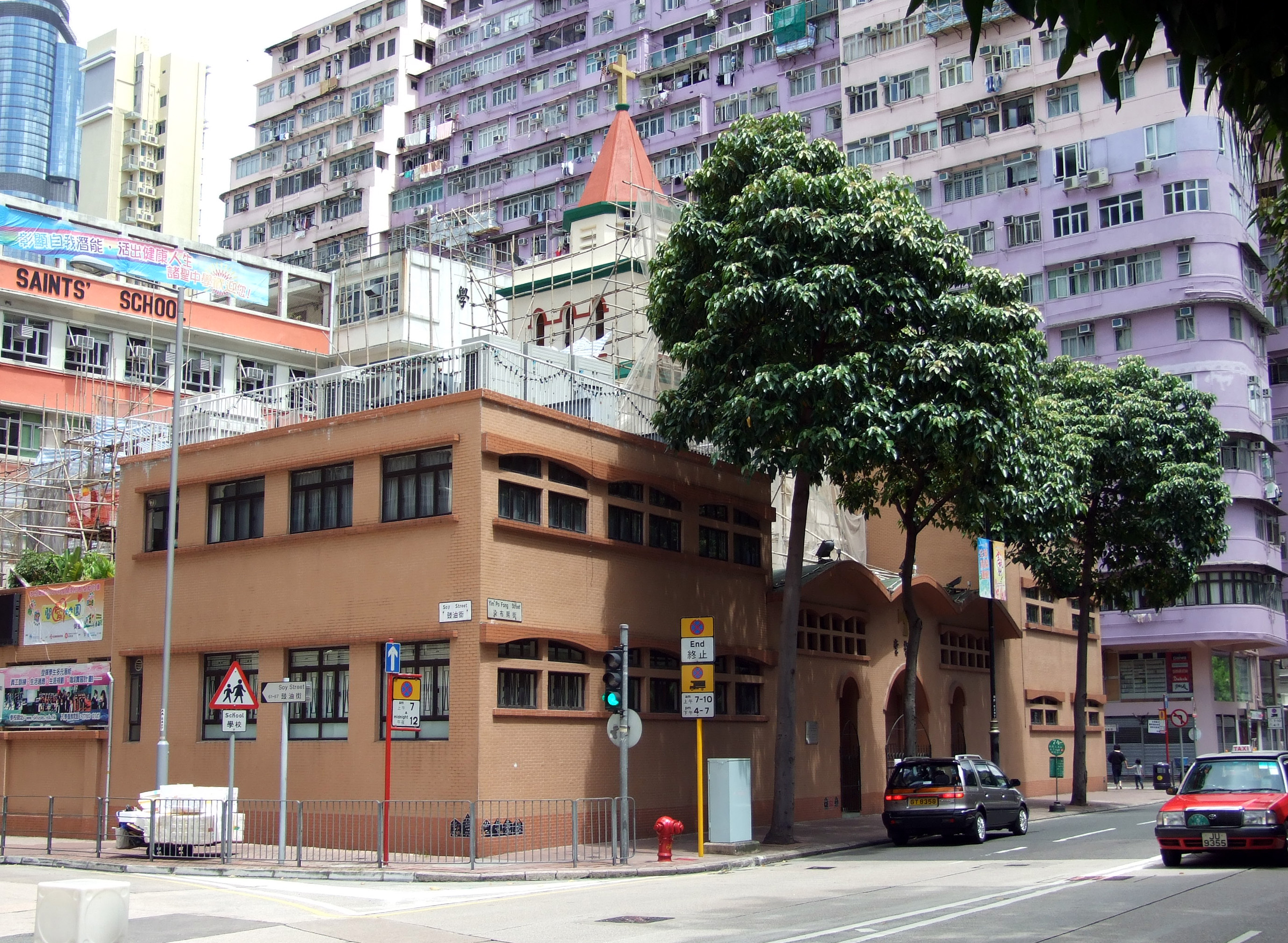
All Saints' Cathedral

=== Parishes ===
- All Saints' Cathedral
- St. Andrew's Church
- St. Thomas' Church
- Kei Oi Church
- St. Matthias' Church
- St. Peter's Church, Castle Peak
- Crown of Thorns Church
- St. Joseph's Church
- St. Philip's Church
- The Church of the Epiphany

=== Missions ===
- The Church of Shalom
- Church of the Divine Love

== See also ==
- Diocese of Hong Kong Island
- Diocese of Eastern Kowloon
- Diocese of Western Kowloon
- Religion in Hong Kong
- Hong Kong Sheng Kung Hui
- List of Anglican churches in Macau
- List of Anglican churches
- Anglican Communion
