= Bishop of Hong Kong =

The Bishop of Hong Kong may refer to the leaders of the following religious entities:

- Roman Catholic Diocese of Hong Kong, established as a Prefecture Apostolic in 1841, as a Vicariate Apostolic in 1874, and as a Diocese in 1946
- Orthodox Metropolitanate of Hong Kong and Southeast Asia, established in 1996

== Anglican Communion ==
- Bishop of Victoria, the Ordinary of a corporation sole from 1849 to 1951
- The bishop for the Diocese of Hong Kong and Macao, an extraprovincial diocese from 1951 to 1998
- Hong Kong Sheng Kung Hui, 38th Province of the Anglican Communion since 1998, with a bishop for each of its three dioceses (one of which serves as the primate and archbishop of the ecclesiastical province; see below):
  - Anglican Diocese of Hong Kong Island
  - Anglican Diocese of Eastern Kowloon
  - Anglican Diocese of Western Kowloon
- Archbishop of Hong Kong, leader of Hong Kong Sheng Kung Hui since its establishment in 1998, and Primate of Hong Kong and Macao
