= Holy Trinity Cathedral, Hong Kong =

Holy Trinity Cathedral
- 聖三一座堂
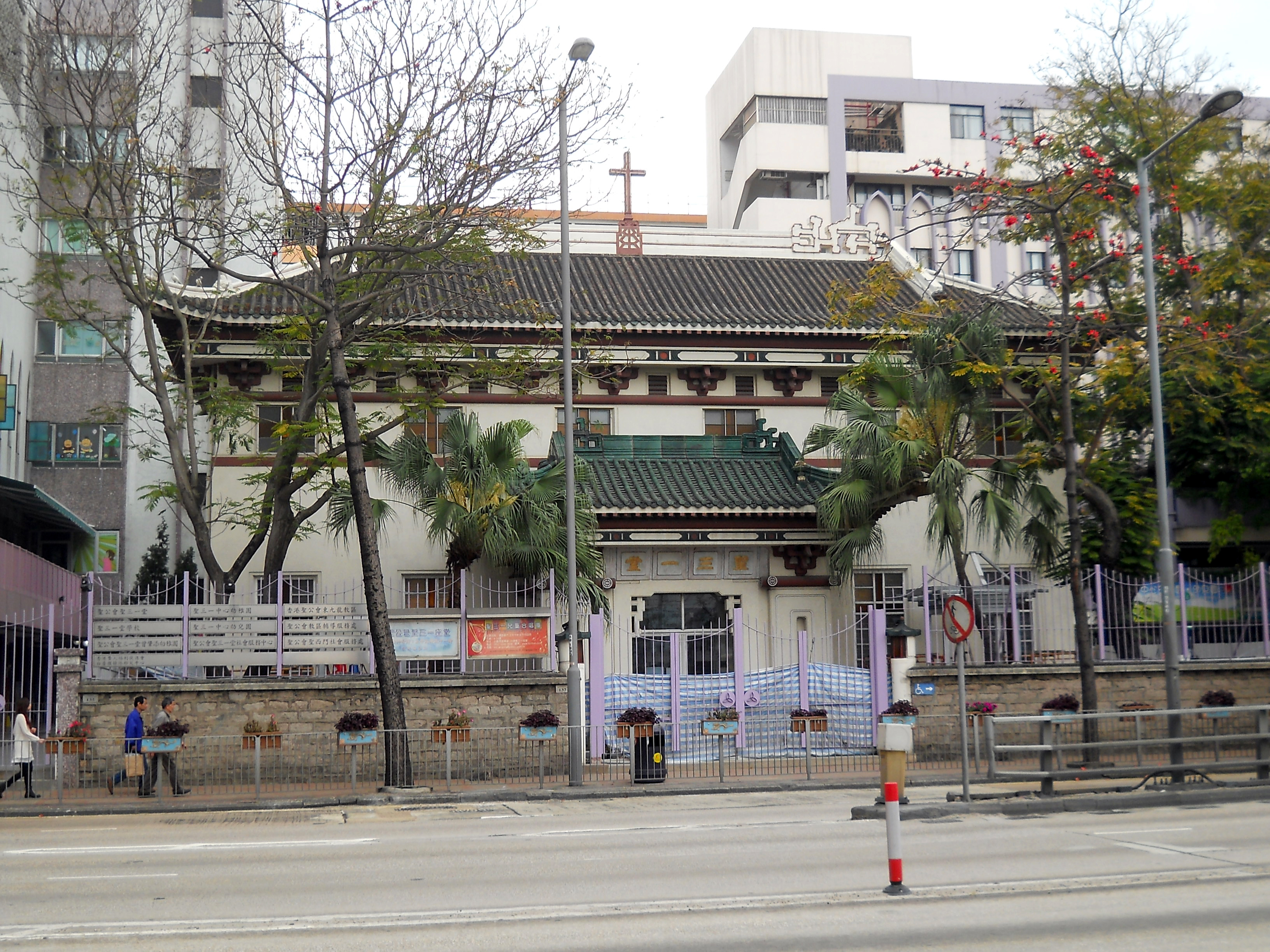
- Pictured in 2012

- Location within Hong Kong
- 22.325321°N 114.189025°E
- Location: 135 Ma Tau Chung Road, Kowloon
- Denomination: Anglican
- Tradition: Anglicanism
- Website: dek.hkskh.org/holytrinity/

History
- Former name: Holy Trinity Church
- Status: Cathedral
- Founded: 15 July 1890
- Founder: Ku Kai-tak
- Dedication: Holy Trinity
- Consecrated: 30 May 2010

Architecture
- Functional status: Active
- Architect: Ng Kin-chung
- Architectural type: Church
- Style: Chinese temple
- Years built: 1937
- Completed: 4 July 1937
- Construction cost: HK$ 40,000 (as at 1936)

Administration
- Province: Hong Kong
- Diocese: Eastern Kowloon

Clergy
- Archbishop: The Most Revd Andrew Chan
- Bishop: The Rt Revd Dr Timothy Kwok
- Dean: The Very Revd Franklin Lee

Holy Trinity Cathedral, Hong Kong
- Traditional Chinese: 聖三一座堂
- Simplified Chinese: 圣三一座堂
- Cantonese Yale: Sing sāam yāt joh tòhng
- Jyutping: Sing3 saam1 jat1 zo6 tong4
Transcriptions
Standard Mandarin
- Hanyu Pinyin: Shèng Sānyī Zuòtáng
Yue: Cantonese
- Yale Romanization: Sing sāam yāt joh tòhng
- Jyutping: Sing3 saam1 jat1 zo6 tong4

Holy Trinity Cathedral, in Kowloon, Hong Kong, is a cathedral for the Anglican Eastern Kowloon diocese. It was established in 1890, making it one of the oldest Anglican churches in Hong Kong. The cathedral is one of the three Anglican cathedrals of the Hong Kong Anglican church (the other two are St John's Cathedral and All Saints' Cathedral).

== History ==
The cathedral was established as Holy Trinity Church in 1890 and consecrated as a cathedral in 2010. The church had been rebuilt twice in nearby locations, mostly to give space for the construction of Kai Tak Airport before finally settled down in its current location at 135 Ma Tau Chung Road, Kowloon. The current structure was built in 1937 and designed by Ng Kin-chung, a draftsman from Leigh and Orange, an architectural firm. The church combines western and traditional Chinese architectural styles. Reinforced concrete structures and traditional Chinese decorations can be seen inside the church and on its roof respectively. It has survived some serious damage during the Japanese occupation in the Second World War between 1941 and 1945. During the war, it was used by the Japanese as a detention camp. In 2011, it received government funding for the restoration of the roof.

The Diocesan Office is located in the nearby Holy Trinity Bradbury Centre, on 139 Ma Tau Chung Road. Holy Trinity Centre Kindergarten & Day Nursery, an affiliated school of the cathedral, is also located in Holy Trinity Bradbury Centre.

== Governance ==
The cathedral, like other Anglican churches in Hong Kong, is part of the worldwide Anglican Communion. It is the see of the Diocese of Eastern Kowloon of the Hong Kong Sheng Kung Hui.

== See also ==
- List of Anglican churches in Hong Kong
- List of Grade II historic buildings in Hong Kong
- List of the oldest buildings and structures in Hong Kong
- List of cathedrals § Asia
- List of cathedrals in Hong Kong
