= Timothy Kwok =

The Right Reverend Timothy Kwok Chi-Pei
- Bishop of Eastern Kowloon
- Province: Hong Kong Anglican Church
- Diocese: Eastern Kowloon
- Installed: 24 November 2014
- Predecessor: Louis Tsui

Personal details
- Born: 1959 (age 66–67) Hong Kong
- Denomination: Anglican
- Education: University of Newcastle Upon Tyne; Wycliffe Hall, Oxford; University of Birmingham

Ordination history
History
Episcopal consecration
- Principal consecrator: Paul Kwong
- Co-consecrators: Peter Kwong; Thomas Soo; Louis Tsui; Andrew Chan

Timothy Kwok Chi-Pei (Chinese: 郭志丕; born 28 March 1959) is a Hong Kong-born Anglican bishop who is serving as Bishop of Eastern Kowloon (diocesan bishop of the Diocese of Eastern Kowloon, Hong Kong Anglican Church (Hong Kong Sheng Kung Hui), Hong Kong) since November 2014.

== Early life ==
Kwok was born in Hong Kong in 1959, he was baptized in 1968 and the Sacrament of Confirmation in 1974.

== Ministry ==
On 21 September 1988, he was ordained deacon from the Diocese of Hong Kong and Macao and ordained priest in the next year; from 1988 to 1994, he served as associate priest in St Peter's Church, Castle Peak and priest-in-charge in 1995 until his episcopal ordination in 2014.

Kwok was elected as the second diocesan bishop of the Diocese of Eastern Kowloon on 30 March 2014; he was consecrated a bishop on 23 November 2014, by Paul Kwong, Archbishop of Hong Kong, at St John's Cathedral (Hong Kong). On the next day, 24 November 2014, Kwok was officially enthroned in Holy Trinity Cathedral.

== Family ==
Kwok is married to Daisy, and has two sons, Samuel and Matthew.
