= Stephen Sidebotham =

Dean of Hong Kong (1935–2021)

Stephen Francis Sidebotham (Chinese: 薛本德, 31 May 1935 – 10 July 2021) was Dean of Hong Kong from 1976 until 1982; and then again from 2003 to 2005.

He was educated at Queens' College, Cambridge and ordained in 1961. After curacies in Southampton and Hong Kong he was Vicar of Christ Church, Kowloon before his first spell as Dean; and Rector of Gravesend between his first and second spell. Sidebotham died on 10 July 2021, at the age of 86.

Church of England titles
Preceded by Rex Alan Howe	Dean of Hong Kong; 1976–1982	Succeeded by Paul Clasper
Hong Kong Sheng Kung Hui titles
Preceded by Christopher John Phillips	Dean of Hong Kong; 2003–2005	Succeeded by Andrew Chan Au-Ming
