= Bishop's House, Hong Kong =

Coordinates: 22°16′48.15″N 114°9′21.64″E

The Bishop's House
- 會督府, 主教府
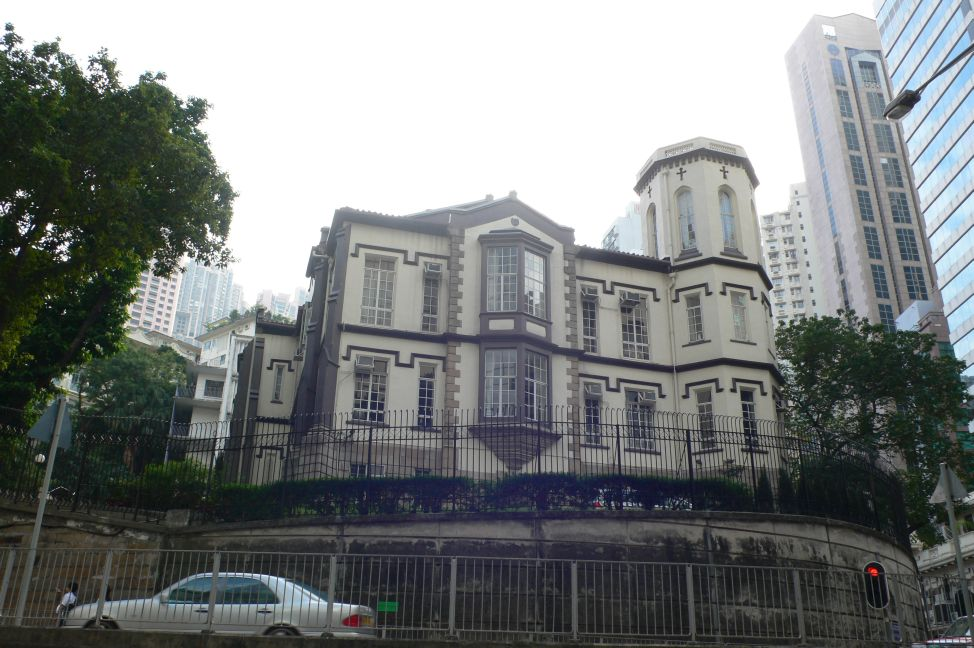
- The Bishop's House
- Interactive map of the The Bishop's House area

General information
- Classification: Grade I historic building
- Location: Central, 1 Lower Albert Road, Hong Kong
- Current tenants: Archbishop of Hong Kong
- Completed: 1848
- Renovated: 1968

Bishop's House, Hong Kong
- Traditional Chinese: 會督府，主教府
- Simplified Chinese: 会督府，主教府
Transcriptions
Standard Mandarin
- Hanyu Pinyin: Huìdūfǔ, Zhǔjiàofǔ
Yue: Cantonese
- Yale Romanization: Wúih dūk fú, jyú gaau fú
- Jyutping: Wui5 duk1 fu2, zyu2 gaau3 fu2

The Bishop's House, located at 1 Lower Albert Road, Central, is the residence and office of the Archbishop of Hong Kong.

== History ==
It was originally designed as a school for Chinese students and for many years housed St Paul's College. The house's origins can be dated from 1843, when Vincent Stanton was appointed Colonial Chaplain of Hong Kong. The building was completed in 1848. When the new Diocese of Victoria was created, Stanton handed over the college property to the newly appointed Bishop, George Smith.

The Bishop's House is an imposing building, both in design and proportions. The interior of the building was completely renovated and modernised in 1967–1968. It has been listed as a Grade I historic building.

== See also ==
- Central and Western Heritage Trail
- List of Grade I historic buildings in Hong Kong
