= Crown of Thorns' Church =

Anglican church in Hong Kong

Coordinates: 22°22′5.17″N 114°7′21.52″E

- Crown of Thorns' Church
- Denomination: Anglican Communion
- Churchmanship: Anglicanism
- Website: http://www.skhthorns.org/

Administration
- Province: Hong Kong Sheng Kung Hui
- Diocese: Western Kowloon

Clergy
- Vicar: Amos Poon Ching Hang

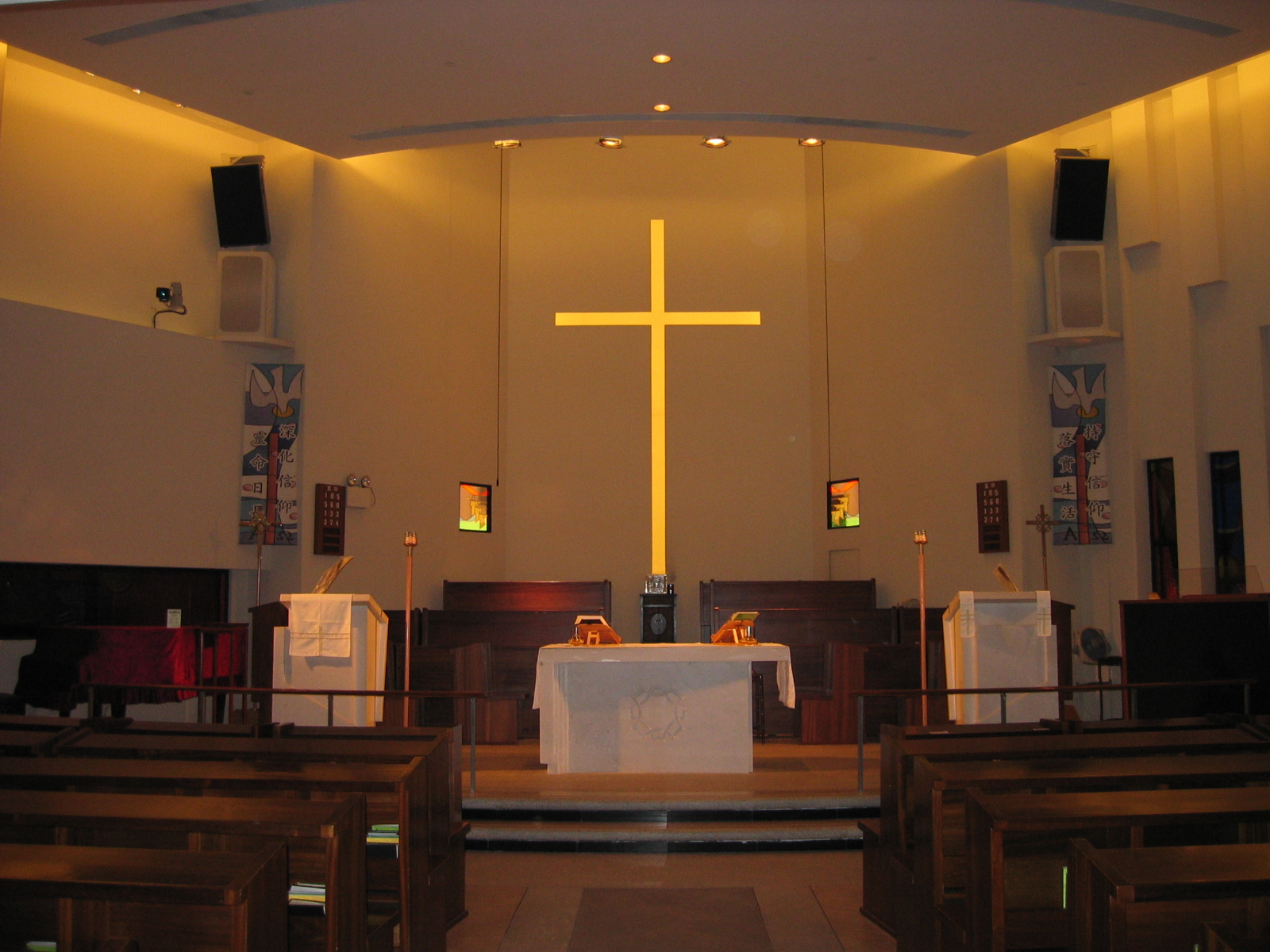

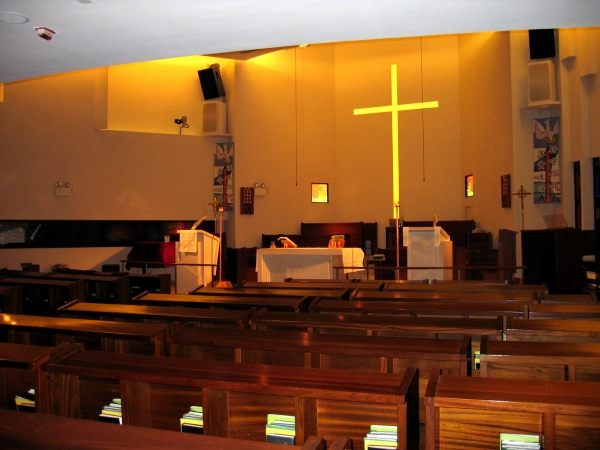

Lam Woo Memorial Secondary School

Crown of Thorns' Church (Cantonese: 荊冕堂, Yale: gīng mín tòhng), located at 67 Texaco Road, the New Territories, is an Anglican church in Hong Kong. It forms a parish in the Diocese of Western Kowloon under Hong Kong Sheng Kung Hui. The vicar of the parish is Jonathan Chee, who is also the current General Secretary of the Diocese of Western Kowloon.

== Crown of Thorns ==
In Christianity, the Crown of Thorns, one of the instruments of the Passion, was the woven chaplet of thorn branches worn by Jesus before his crucifixion. It is mentioned in the Gospels of Matthew (Matthew 27:29), Mark (Mark 15:17), and John (John 1919:2, 5) and is often alluded to by the early Christian Fathers, such as Clement of Alexandria, Origen, and others.

John the Evangelist describes it thus (KJV, ch. 19):

Then Pilate therefore took Jesus, and scourged him. And the soldiers plaited a crown of thorns, and put it on his head, and they put on him a purple robe, And said, Hail, King of the Jews! and they smote him with their hands. Pilate therefore went forth again, and saith unto them, Behold, I bring him forth to you, that ye may know that I find no fault in him. Then came Jesus forth, wearing the crown of thorns, and the purple robe. And Pilate saith unto them, Behold the man!

== History ==
The Church was found in 1965. The first vicar was Peter Kwong, the former Archbishop of Hong Kong.

== Educational institutions served by the Church ==
- SKH Lam Woo Memorial Secondary School
- SKH Chu Oi Primary School
- SKH Chu Yan Primary School
- SKH Ho Chak Wan Primary School
- SKH Tsing Yi Chu Yan Primary School
- SKH Tsing Yi Estate Ho Chak Wan Primary School
- SKH Yan Laap Memorial Primary School
- SKH Yan Laap Primary School

== See also ==
- Anglicanism
- Diocese of Western Kowloon
- Hong Kong Sheng Kung Hui
