= Dennis Leung =

Hong Kong politician (born 1973)

The Honourable Dennis Leung Tsz-wing MH
- 梁子穎
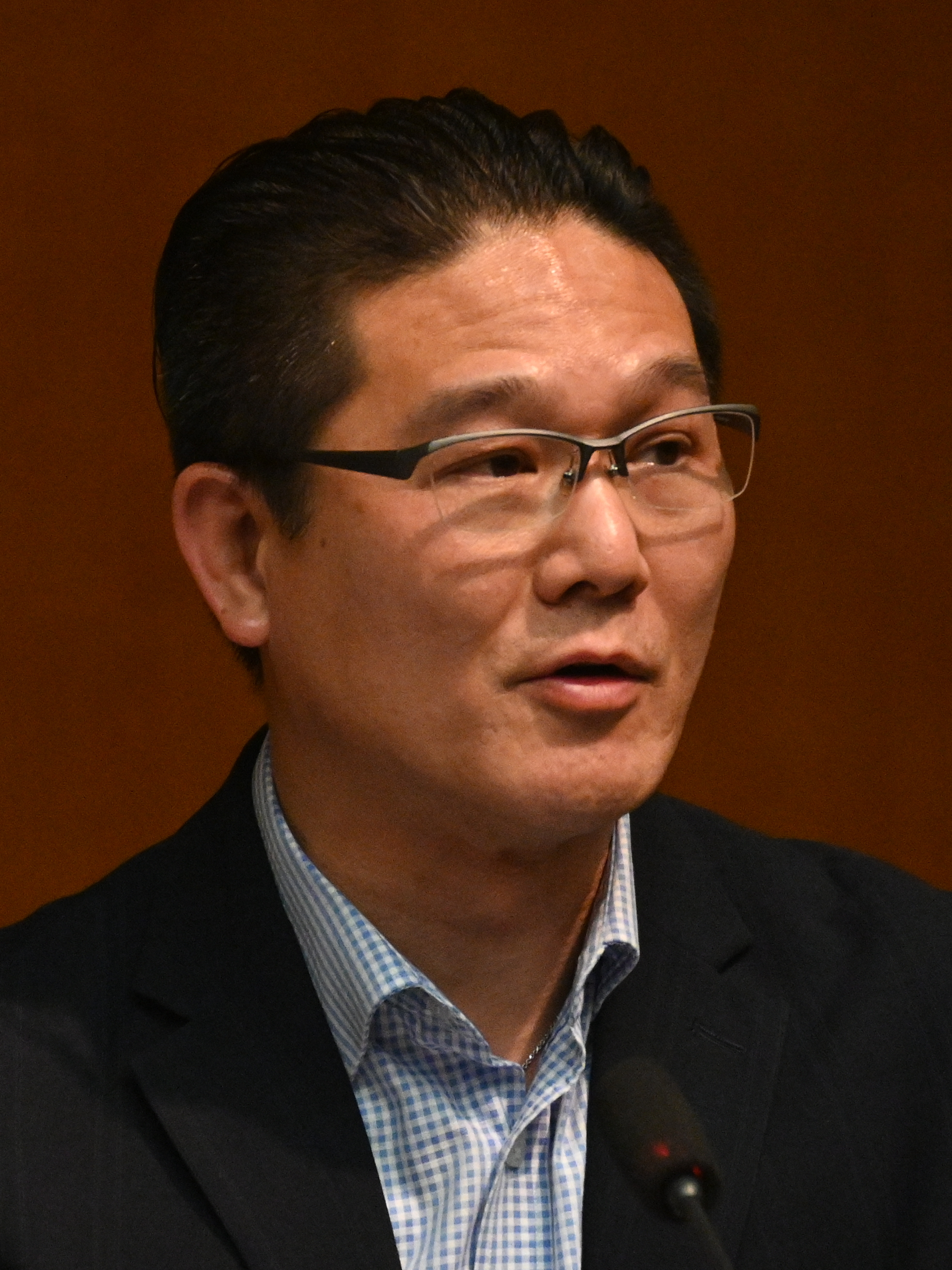
- Leung in 2025

Member of the Legislative Council
- Incumbent
- Assumed office 1 January 2022
- Preceded by: Luk Chung-hung; Poon Siu-ping
- Constituency: Labour

Member of the Kwai Tsing District Council
- In office 1 January 2008 – 31 December 2019
- Preceded by: Leung Wing-kuen
- Succeeded by: Leung Wing-kuen
- Constituency: On Yam

Personal details
- Born: 6 October 1973 (age 52) Zhuhai, China
- Party: Hong Kong Federation of Trade Unions (FTU)
- Other political affiliations: Democratic Alliance for the Betterment and Progress of Hong Kong (DAB) (2003–2014)
- Education: Hong Kong University of Science & Technology; Chinese University of Hong Kong; Paris Dauphine University
- Occupation: Politician; Teacher
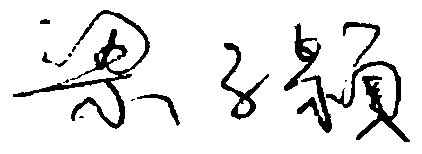
- Signature

Dennis Leung Tsz-wing, MH (Chinese: 梁子穎; born 6 October 1973) is a Hong Kong politician and teacher. He is a member of the Legislative Council of Hong Kong for Labour constituency since 2022 and for election committee constituency since 2026, a member of Hong Kong Federation of Trade Unions (FTU).

== Biography ==
Leung was graduated from the Hong Kong University of Science & Technology with a Bachelor of Science in mathematics and the Chinese University of Hong Kong with a postgraduate diploma of education and a Master of Education. He also obtained a Master of Science in mathematics of actuarial science and finance from the City University of Hong Kong and the Paris Dauphine University.

He taught in several secondary schools in his teaching career, including the Sheng Kung Hui Lam Woo Memorial Secondary School in Kwai Chung where he laid the foundation of his political career in the district.

Leung first participated in the electoral politics when he contested in the 2003 District Council election, running in Siu Hong as a candidate for pro-Beijing Democratic Alliance for the Betterment of Hong Kong (DAB) but was defeated by Josephine Chan of the Democratic Party. He was first elected to the Kwai Tsing District Council in the 2007 District Council election through On Yam constituency, until he was defeated in the pro-democracy landslide in 2019.

He ran as a candidate for the Hong Kong Federation of Trade Unions (FTU) led by Wong Kwok-hing in the 2008 Legislative Council election in New Territories West, where he was placed the fifth on the ticket. He was again placed second behind Chan Yuen-han on the FTU ticket in District Council (Second) territory-wide constituency, but was also not elected.

Leung was elected in the 2021 Legislative Council election through Labour constituency.

Leung was re-elected in the 2025 Legislative Council election through election committee constituency.

Political offices
Preceded by Leung Wing-kuen	Member of the Kwai Tsing District Council; Representative for On Yam; 2008–2019	Succeeded by Leung Wing-kuen
Legislative Council of Hong Kong
Preceded by Luk Chung-hung; Poon Siu-ping	Member of Legislative Council; Representative for Labour; 2022–present	Incumbent
