= List of Anglican churches in Macau =

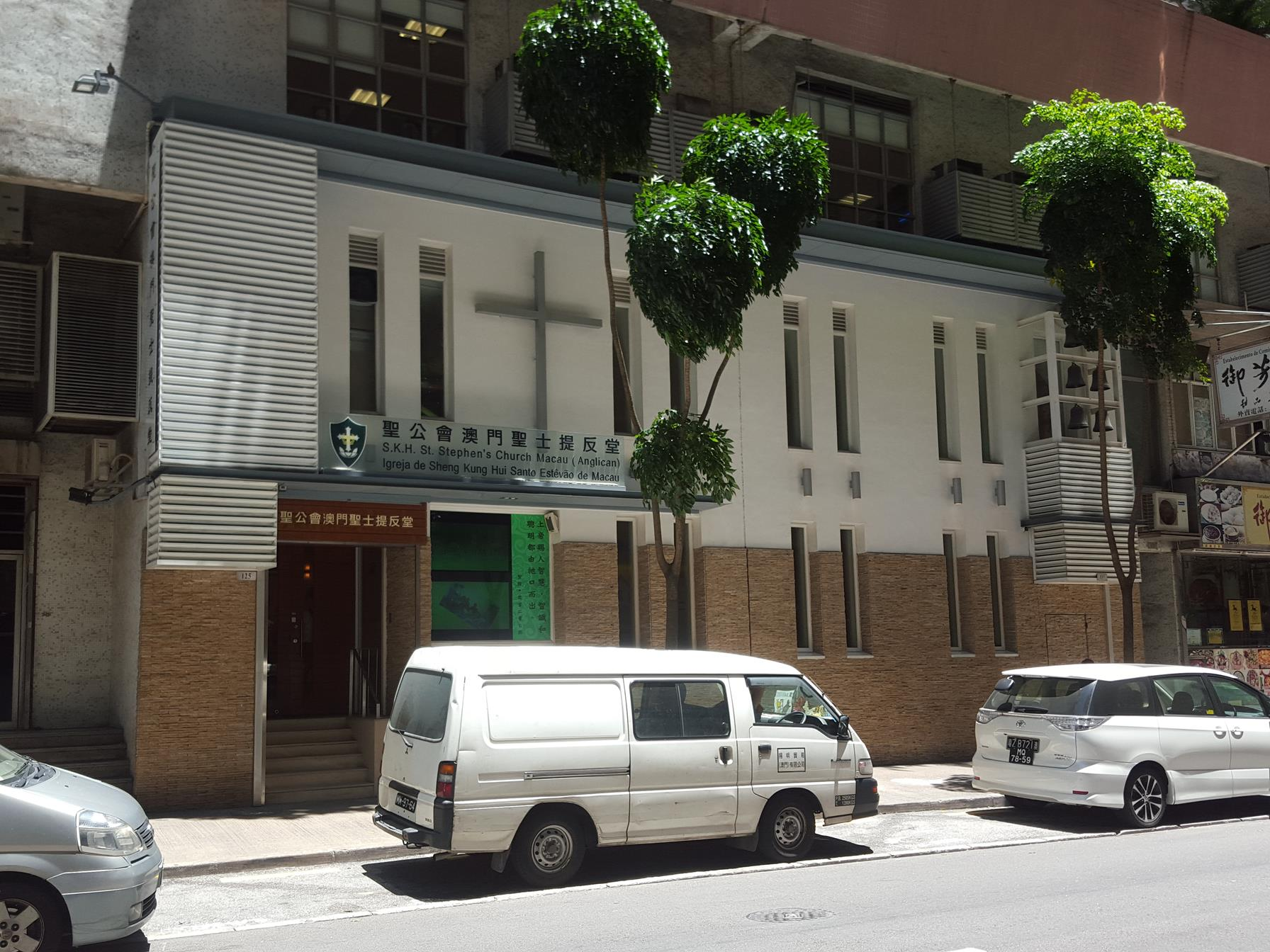
St. Stephen's Church

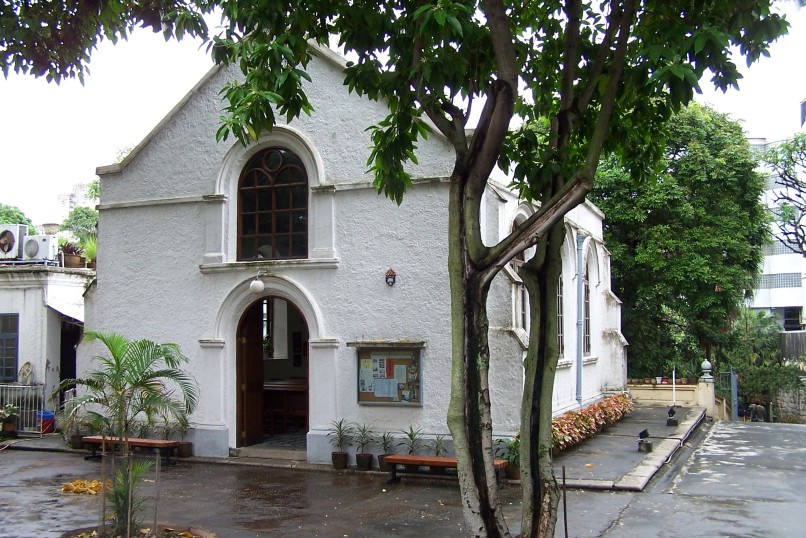
Morrison Chapel

The list of Anglican churches in Macau is as follows:

== Parish ==
The following is a parish church of the Missionary Area of Macau:

- St. Mark's Church

== Missions ==
The following are the mission churches of the Missionary Area of Macau:

- Morrison Chapel
- St. Paul's Church
- St. Stephen's Church

The Holy Cross Church closed on 15 July 2018.

== See also ==
- Missionary Area of Macau
- Religion in Macau
- Hong Kong Sheng Kung Hui
- List of Anglican churches in Hong Kong
- List of Anglican churches
- Anglican Communion
