= Macau Protestant Chapel =

Church in Macau, China

Morrison Chapel
- 馬禮遜堂
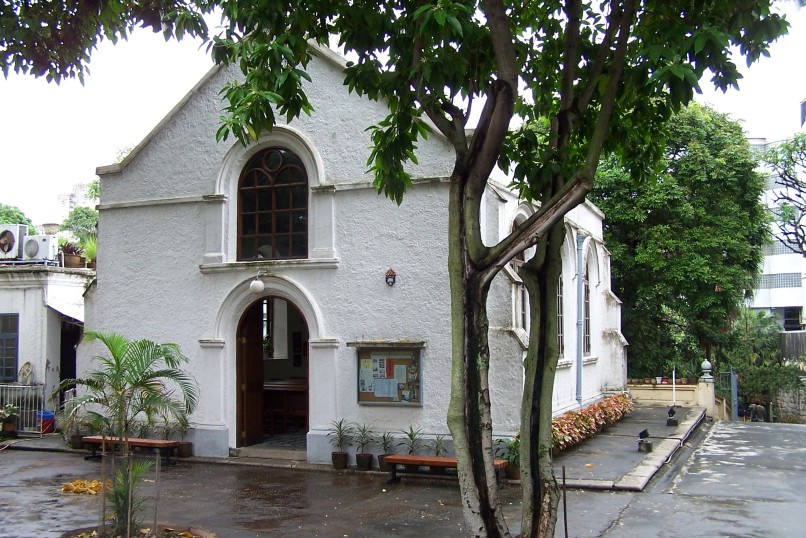
- Pictured in 2006

- Location within Macau
- 22°11′59″N 113°32′23″E
- Location: Camões Square, Santo António, Macau
- Country: Macau
- Denomination: Anglican
- Website: morrisonchapel.com

History
- Status: Mission
- Founded: c. 1820–1830
- Dedication: Robert Morrison

Architecture
- Functional status: Active
- Architectural type: Church
- Years built: 1922

Administration
- District: Santo António
- Province: Hong Kong

Clergy
- Archbishop: The Most Revd Dr Paul Kwong
- Bishop: The Most Revd Dr Paul Kwong

Macau Protestant Chapel

Chinese name
- Traditional Chinese: 馬禮遜教堂
- Simplified Chinese: 马礼逊教堂
- Cantonese Yale: máh làih seun gaau tòhng
Transcriptions
Standard Mandarin
- Hanyu Pinyin: Mǎlǐxùn Jiàotáng
Yue: Cantonese
- Yale Romanization: máh làih seun gaau tòhng
- Jyutping: maa5 lai5 seon3 gaau3 tong4/4*2

Portuguese name
- Portuguese: Capela Protestante

Morrison Chapel (Portuguese: Capela Protestante; Chinese: 馬禮遜教堂), also known as Morrison Protestant Chapel, is an Anglican chapel situated in Luís de Camões Square, Santo António, Macau Peninsula, Macau. Originally built in the early 19th century to serve the spiritual needs of the employees of East India Company, the chapel now serves the worshipers with a variety of denominational backgrounds in the Missionary Area of Macau. The present chapel was built in 1922.

== History ==
Traders of the East India Company were engaged in trade with China from the late 18th century until 1834. Their charter includes stipulations that employees of the company should be allowed to attend religious services on a regular basis and chaplains should be sent out from England to take care of the spiritual needs of employees.

Before 1821, when the land for a chapel and burial ground (now the Old Protestant Cemetery) was purchased, the chapel was probably simply a room at the offices of the British East India Company. The purchase of the burial ground was prompted by the death of Mary Morrison, wife of Robert Morrison, missionary and translator employed by the East India Company. Prior to this, the Portuguese authorities had only allowed Roman Catholic burials in the colony.

Nothing is known about the construction of the first chapel at the site. The first recorded ceremony at the chapel was a marriage in 1833.

In 1834, when the East India Company lost its trade monopoly, responsibility for the chapel and cemetery was taken by the British government. In 1870 this responsibility was transferred by Deed of Transfer to Trustees consisting of three high ranking representatives of at least two nations having Protestant members living in Macau.

In 1921 the Chapel required complete rebuilding, except for the original foundation. Two conditions were placed on these works; it had to be hidden from the street behind a high wall, and it could have no church bell. The chapel has remained structurally unaltered since the completion of these works in 1922.

In 1941 the congregation was swollen in numbers by refugees fleeing the Second Sino-Japanese War. The Japanese occupation of Hong Kong and of parts of China had made it impossible for Anglican priests to get to neutral Macau, where there was no resident Anglican priest; Florence Li Tim-Oi, the deaconess in charge of the chapel, was authorised by Bishop Ronald Hall and his assistant to give the sacraments to the Anglicans in these extenuating circumstances. On 25 January 1944 she was ordained 'a Priest of God' by Bishop Hall, thus became the first female priest in the worldwide Anglican Communion.

== See also ==
- Religion in Macau
- Missionary Area of Macau
- Hong Kong Sheng Kung Hui
- List of Anglican churches in Macau
- Anglican Communion
