= On Yam Estate =

Public housing estate in Kwai Chung, Hong Kong

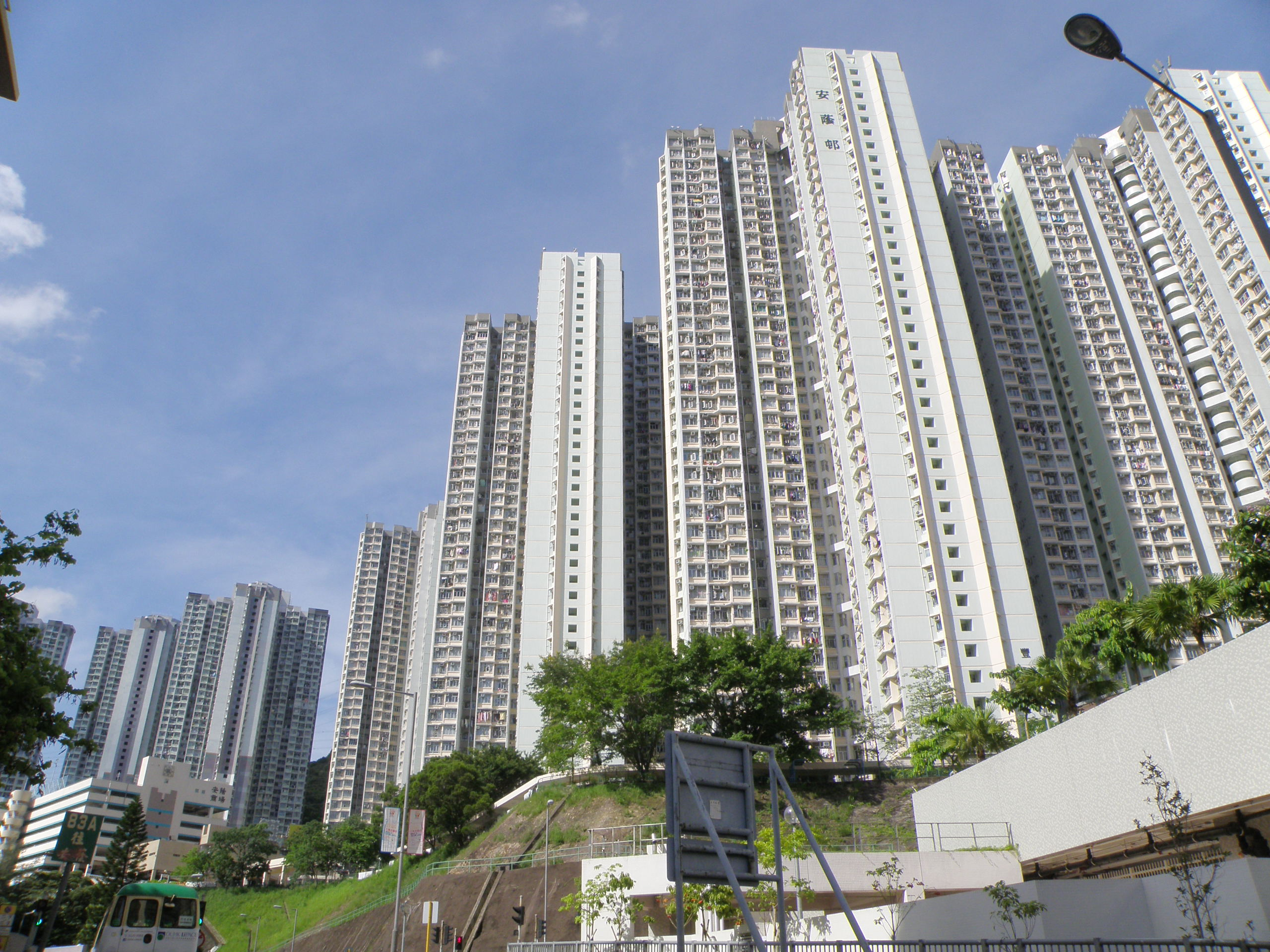
- On Yam Estate
- Interactive map of On Yam Estate

General information
- Location: 7 On Chuk Street, North Kwai Chung; New Territories, Hong Kong
- Coordinates: 22.372899°N 114.14112°E
- Status: Completed
- Category: Public rental housing
- Population: 15,736 (2016)
- No. of blocks: 8
- No. of units: 5,492

Construction
- Constructed: 1994; 32 years ago
- Authority: Hong Kong Housing Authority

On Yam Estate (Chinese: 安蔭邨) is a public housing estate in North Kwai Chung, New Territories, Hong Kong. It is situated on land which was formerly the location of Shek Yam Temporary Housing Area (Chinese: 石蔭臨時房屋區) and Shek Lei Temporary Housing Area (Chinese: 石籬臨時房屋區). The estate consists of 8 residential buildings (in Phase 1 and 2) completed in 1994 and 1995.

== Houses ==
Name	Chinese name	Building type	Completed
Hong Yam House	康蔭樓	Harmony 1	1994
Kar Yam House	嘉蔭樓	Harmony 1	1994
Cheung Yam House	祥蔭樓	Harmony 1	1994
Yiu Yam House	耀蔭樓	Harmony 1	1995
Tak Yam House	德蔭樓	Harmony 1	1995
Chak Yam House	澤蔭樓	Harmony 1	1995
Fung Yam House	豐蔭樓	Harmony 1	1995
Shing Yam House	盛蔭樓	Harmony 1	1995

== Demographics ==
According to the 2016 by-census, On Yam Estate had a population of 15,736. The median age was 46.9 and the majority of residents (96 per cent) were of Chinese ethnicity. The average household size was 3.1 people. The median monthly household income of all households (i.e. including both economically active and inactive households) was HK$26,000.

== Politics ==
On Yam Estate is located in On Yam constituency of the Kwai Tsing District Council. It was formerly represented by Leung Wing-kuen, who was elected in the 2019 elections until July 2021.

== See also ==
- Public housing estates in Kwai Chung
