= Shatin Anglican Church =

Hong Kong Anglican church

Coordinates: 22.3879°N 114.1950°E

Shatin Anglican Church (Chinese: 沙田堂) is a Hong Kong Sheng Kung Hui (Anglican) church located in Shatin, New Territories, Hong Kong. It is a mission church under the Diocese of Eastern Kowloon. It was established in 1991 as a daughter church of St. Andrew's Church.

The current minister is Rev. Heewoo Han.
