= On Yam (constituency) =

Hong Kong constituency

- Elected constituency for the Kwai Tsing District Council
- Boundary of On Yam in Kwai Tsing District
- District: Kwai Tsing
- Legislative Council constituency: New Territories South West
- Population: 16,183 (2019)
- Electorate: 9,962 (2019)

Current constituency
- Created: 1994
- Number of members: One
- Member: vacant

On Yam is one of the 31 constituencies of the Kwai Tsing District Council. The seat elects one member of the council every four years. It was first created in 1994. Its boundary is loosely based on the On Yam Estate.

== Councillors represented ==
Election	Member	Party
1994	Leung Wing-kuen	Democratic
2003	Leung Wing-kuen	NWSC/Frontier
2007	Dennis Leung Tsz-wing	FTU/DAB
2019	Leung Wing-kuen→vacant	Democratic

== Election results ==
=== 2010s ===
Kwai Tsing District Council Election, 2019: On Yam
Party	Candidate	Votes	%	±%
Democratic	Leung Wing-kuen	3,585	52.01	+11.71
FTU	Dennis Leung Tsz-wing	3,308	47.99	−11.71
Majority		277	4.02	
Turnout		6,929	69.59	
Democratic gain from FTU		Swing		

Kwai Tsing District Council Election, 2015: On Yam
Party	Candidate	Votes	%	±%
FTU	Dennis Leung Tsz-wing	2,714	59.7	–0.4
Democratic	Leung Wing-kuen	1,831	40.3	+0.3
Majority		883	19.4	–0.8
Turnout		4,617	49.6	
FTU hold		Swing	–0.4	

Kwai Tsing District Council Election, 2011: On Yam
Party	Candidate	Votes	%	±%
FTU (DAB)	Dennis Leung Tsz-wing	2,768	60.10	+4.91
Democratic	Leung Wing-kuen	1,838	39.90	−4.91
Majority		1,374	20.19	+1.68
FTU hold		Swing		

=== 2000s ===
Kwai Tsing District Council Election, 2007: On Yam
Party	Candidate	Votes	%	±%
FTU (DAB)	Dennis Leung Tsz-wing	2,929	55.19	+27.95
NWSC	Leung Wing-kuen	2,014	44.81	−27.95
Majority		915	18.51	−27.0
FTU gain from NWSC		Swing		

Kwai Tsing District Council Election, 2003: On Yam
Party	Candidate	Votes	%	±%
NWSC (Frontier)	Leung Wing-kuen	3,290	72.76	+21.02
DAB	Tam Hon-sang	1,232	27.24	−21.02
Majority		2,058	45.51	+42.02
NWSC hold		Swing		

=== 1990s ===
Kwai Tsing District Council Election, 1999: On Yam
Party	Candidate	Votes	%	±%
Democratic	Leung Wing-kuen	2,642	51.74	−18.86
DAB	Au Yeung Po-chun	2,464	48.26	N/A
Majority		178	3.49	−37.72
Democratic hold		Swing		

Kwai Tsing District Board Election, 1994: On Yam
Party	Candidate	Votes	%	±%
Democratic	Leung Wing-kuen	759	70.60	
Public Affairs Council	Lee Sung-sun	316	29.40	
Majority		443	41.21	(new)
Democratic win (new seat)				
