= Sheng Kung Hui Lam Woo Memorial Secondary School =

Coordinates: 22°21′53.80″N 114°7′49.53″E

- Chinese: 聖公會林護紀念中學
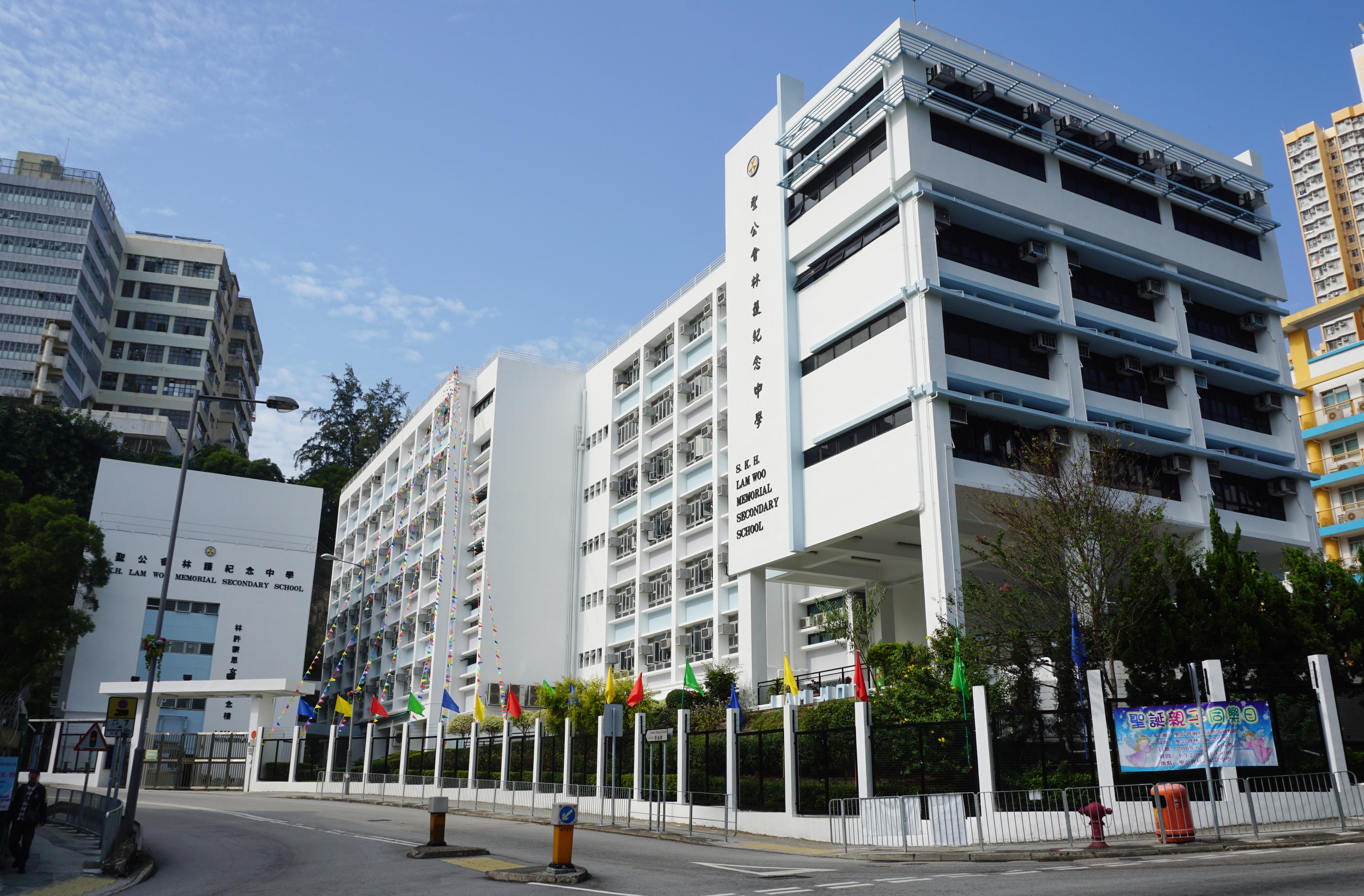
- LWMSS
- 397 Kwai Shing Circuit, Kwai Chung, N.T. Hong Kong

Information
- Type: Secondary school
- Motto: The Truth will make you free.
- Denomination: Anglican
- Established: 1970; 56 years ago
- School district: Kwai Tsing
- Principal: Mr. Cheng Hong Yung
- Enrollment: approx. 1,227
- Affiliation: Sheng Kung Hui
- Forms Alumni: Form 1 to Form 6 Alumni Website
- Website: www.lamwoo.edu.hk

Sheng Kung Hui Lam Woo Memorial Secondary School (LWMSS, Traditional Chinese: 聖公會林護紀念中學) is an Anglican secondary school located at Kwai Shing Circuit, Kwai Chung, the New Territories, Hong Kong. The school was founded in 1970 by Hong Kong Sheng Kung Hui (Anglican Church in Hong Kong) and was named after Mr. Lam Woo for his donations to promote education. It is one of the parish schools of Crown of Thorns' Church. The school consists of 1,227 students from 31 classes and 70 staff at the year of 2006/2007 and is headed by the principal Mr. Hong Yung Cheng (Chinese: 鄭航勇先生). The school is notable for its academic achievements as evident in students' public examination results. In the Hong Kong Certificate of Education Examination 2007, each student scored 5.1 distinctions and credits on average, which is above average among secondary schools in Hong Kong. In 2008, the school announced its first student getting 10As in the HKCEE since the foundation of school.

== Academic achievement ==
In Hong Kong Certificate of Education Examination 2007, 17 students of the school obtained 6As or above. The best result obtained by 3 of these students was 8As & 1B.

In Hong Kong Certificate of Education Examination 2008, 9 students of the school obtained 6As of above. 1 of these students obtained 10As, who has been the 1st achiever in the school's history.

In Hong Kong Certificate of Education Examination 2010, 20 students of the school obtained 6As of above and 1 of these students obtained 10As.

In all the previous Hong Kong Advanced Level Examination, many students of both arts class and science class obtained 5As or 6As. The ratio for Lam Woo matriculation students to enter university is 100% every year.

In Hong Kong Diploma of Secondary Education Examination (HKDSE) 2022, 1 student obtained 7 x 5**.

== Music Department ==
The Music Department is part of the school's Cultural Faculty. The department runs six Music School Teams and more than 90 Instrument Training Classes with the assistance of the Extra-Curricular Activities Section of the Non-Academic Development Division. The school teams are Junior Choir, Mixed Voice Choir, Orchestra, Symphonic Band, Chinese Orchestra and Harmonica Band. Also, the Mixed Voice Choir won the Gold Medal & Champion in the 6th World Choir Games (Shaoxing, China) in 2010. According to the Musica Mundi World Ranking List, the choir is ranked 35th in the Children's and Youth Choirs category, and 138th overall in the world. In 2013, the school's Orchestra, Symphonic Band and Chinese Orchestra have awarded three gold prizes in the 2013 Hong Kong Youth Music Interflows competition.

Chinese Orchestra performing at Tsuen Wan Town Hall

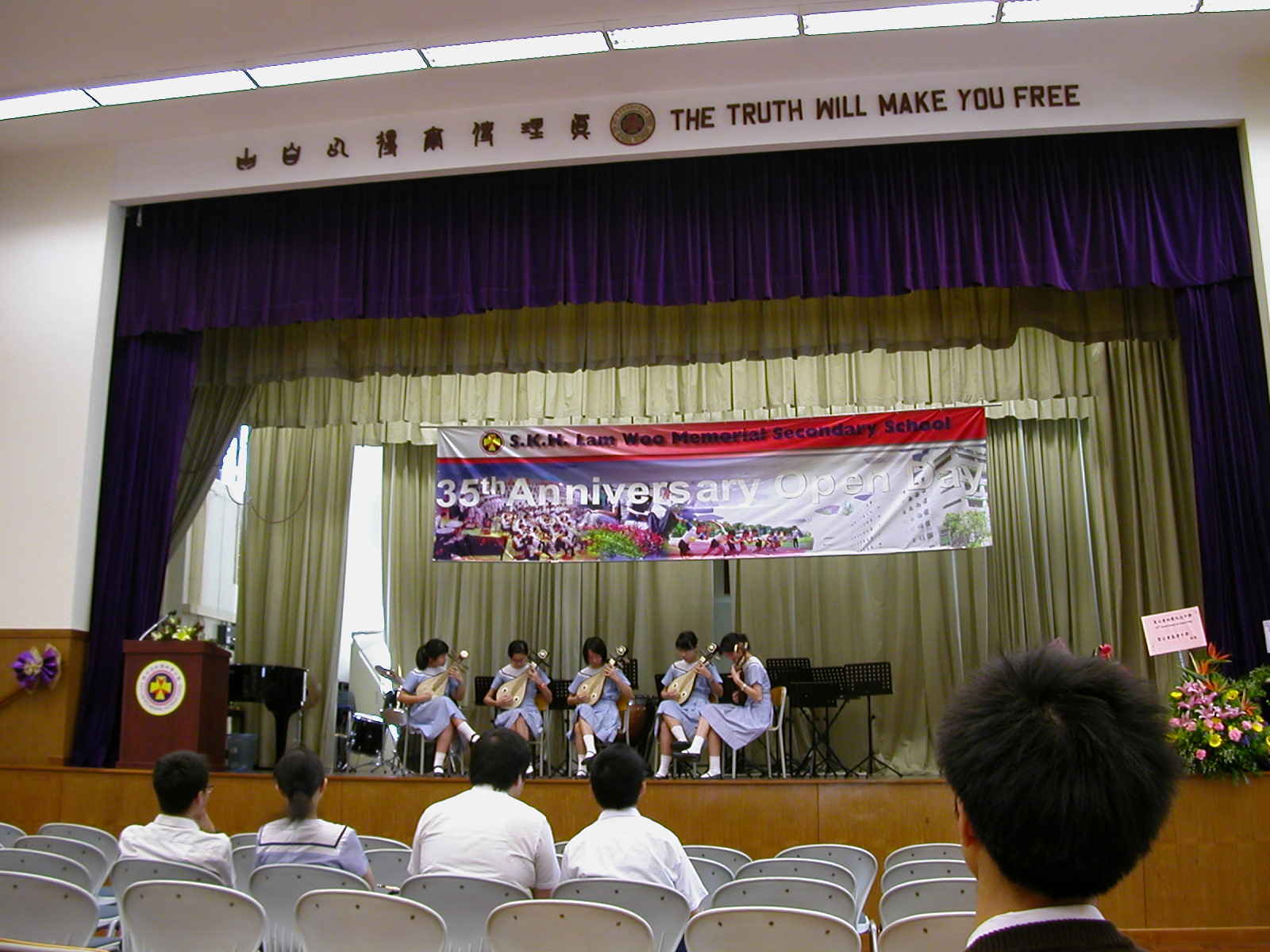
The School Hall

== Notable alumni ==
- Sin Chung Kai (單仲楷) - a member of Hong Kong Legislative Council
- Monie Tung (董敏莉) - a graduate of Arts Faculty of University of Hong Kong specialising in French, and now a model, singer and actress in Hong Kong

== See also ==
- Education in Hong Kong
- List of secondary schools in Hong Kong
- Diocese of Western Kowloon
