= Diocese of Eastern Kowloon =

Diocese of Eastern Kowloon 東九龍教區

Location
- Territory: Eastern Kowloon; Eastern New Territories
- Ecclesiastical province: Hong Kong
- Headquarters: Holy Trinity Bradbury Centre

Statistics
- Parishes: 11
- Churches: 5
- Schools: 54

Information
- Denomination: Anglican
- Rite: Use of Salisbury
- Established: 20 September 1998
- Cathedral: Holy Trinity Cathedral

Current leadership
- Bishop: The Rt Revd Dr Timothy Kwok
- Dean: The Very Revd Franklin Lee On-yip
- Bishops emeritus: The Rt Revd Louis Tsui

Website
- dek.hkskh.org

Diocese of Eastern Kowloon
- Traditional Chinese: 東九龍教區
- Simplified Chinese: 东九龙教区
Transcriptions
Standard Mandarin
- Hanyu Pinyin: Dōng Jiǔlóng Jiàoqū
Yue: Cantonese
- Jyutping: dung1 gau2 lung4 gaau3 keoi1

The Diocese of Eastern Kowloon is one of the three dioceses under the Hong Kong Sheng Kung Hui. Its territory covers most part of eastern Kowloon and eastern New Territories. Holy Trinity Cathedral, cathedral of the diocese, was established in 1890, making it one of the oldest Anglican churches in Hong Kong. Incumbent bishop, Timothy Kwok, was elected on 30 March 2014 and enthroned on 23 November 2014, replacing the outgoing bishop, Louis Tsui.

== Introduction ==
The Diocese was constituted in conformity with the traditions of the Anglican Communion. Since its establishment, it has cooperated with other two Dioceses in many issues under the metropolitical body of the Hong Kong Sheng Kung Hui, the General Synod.

As a member of the Province, the Diocese confesses the faith revealed in the Scriptures of the Old and New Testaments; the Apostles’, Nicene and Athanasian Creeds. The Diocese has preserved the old roots of the Christian faith through its historic Anglican traditions: the Book of Common Prayer and the holy orders.

Sharing the same missions and goals with other Dioceses in Hong Kong, the Diocese aimed to spread the good news across Hong Kong through pastoral care and evangelism. The Province has devoted itself to fulfill the Christian responsibilities through mutual cooperation of the Dioceses.

Land reclamation has created new lands from Hung Hom to Kowloon Bay to enable future developments. With height restrictions being removed soon after operations of the former Kai Tak Airport was ceased, creation of a new infrastructural network will increase population and help economic development. Thus, the Diocese has borne more responsibilities in different sectors.

The nucleus of the Diocese is much situated in Kowloon City, a district rich in historical and cultural heritage, strives to remind people of the traditional Chinese culture and traditions.

== Churches ==
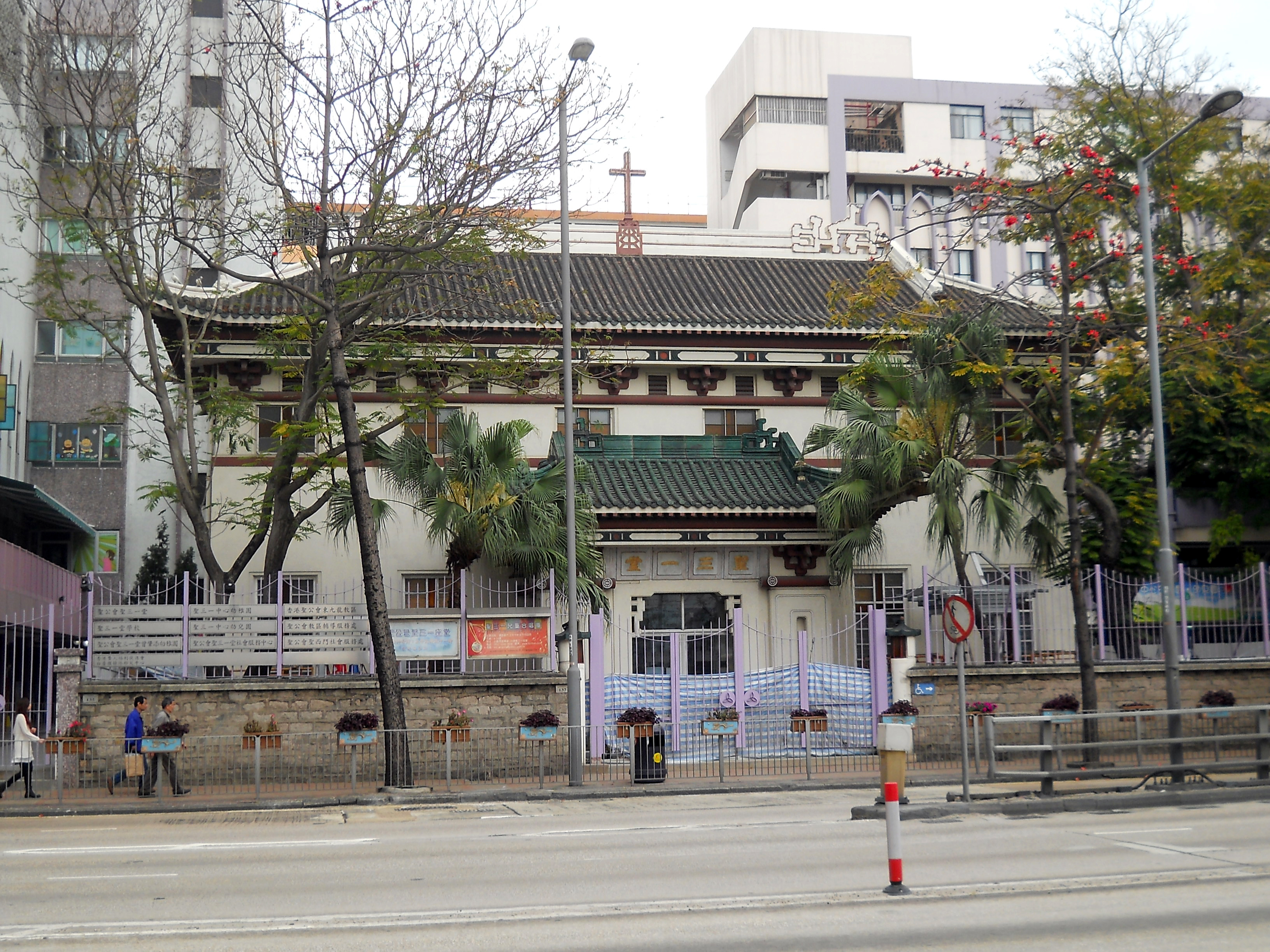
Holy Trinity Cathedral

=== Parishes ===
- Holy Trinity Cathedral
- Christ Church
- Holy Carpenter Church
- Church of the Good Shepherd
- St. Mark's Church
- Calvary Church
- St. Barnabas' Church
- Kindly Light Church
- Holy Spirit Church
- Church of St. John the Baptist
- Church of the Holy Word
- Church of Our Saviour
- St. Titus' Church

=== Missions ===
- Holy Wisdom Church
- Resurrection Church
- Shatin Anglican Church
- Church of the Transfiguration
- St. Augustine's Chapel

== Administration ==
Several committees were established under the Diocesan Synod to oversee the Diocese-at-large and manage the Diocesan affairs:

- The Standing Committee
- The Finance Committee
- The Committee on Christian Nurture and Pastoral Care
- The Youth Committee
- The Committee for Mission
- The Committee on Religion Education

== Bishops ==
1. 1998–2013: Louis Tsui
2. 2014–present: Timothy Kwok

=== Louis Tsui ===
Louis Tsui Tsan-Sang (Chinese: 徐贊生; born 12 April 1943) is a retired Anglican bishop who served as the first Bishop of Eastern Kowloon (diocesan bishop of the Diocese of Eastern Kowloon) from its creation in 1998 until his retirement in 2013. Tsui was consecrated a bishop on 30 November 1995 at St John's Cathedral (Hong Kong) and served as an area bishop for Kowloon East & New Territories East (in the Diocese of Hong Kong and Macao) in anticipation of the diocese's split. He became diocesan bishop of Eastern Kowloon on the diocese's erection in 1998, and served until his retirement at the end of 2013.

== See also ==
- Diocese of Hong Kong Island
- Diocese of Western Kowloon
- List of Anglican churches in Hong Kong
- Anglican Communion
