= General Synod =

Title of the governing body of some church organizations

The General Synod is the title of the governing body of some church organizations.

== Anglican Communion ==
The General Synod of the Church of England, which was established in 1970 replacing the Church Assembly, is the legislative body of the Church of England.

The equivalent In the Episcopal Church in the United States is the General Convention.

Several other churches in the Anglican Communion also have General Synods:

- Anglican Church of Australia
- Anglican Church of Canada
- Church of Ireland
- Anglican Church in Aotearoa, New Zealand and Polynesia
- Scottish Episcopal Church
- Hong Kong Sheng Kung Hui (Anglican Church in Hong Kong)

== Other churches ==
The United Church of Christ, based in the United States, also calls its main governing body a General Synod. It meets every two years and consists of over 600 delegates from various congregations and conferences.

The Missionary Baptist Conference of the USA calls their main governing body a General Synod. It meets annually to set the theological and missional direction for the denomi-network.

The Associate Reformed Presbyterian Church (ARP) has the General Synod as its highest church court. The ARP General Synod meets yearly and in recent years has, almost without exception, been held at the Bonclarken in North Carolina. The delegates to the General Synod consists of the elder representatives elected from each church's session and all ministers from all presbyteries that comprise the Church (excluding ministers and elders from the independent ARP Synods of Mexico and Pakistan).

The Evangelical Church of Augsburg and Helvetic Confession in Austria and the United Evangelical Lutheran Church of Germany each call their main legislative bodies Generalsynode. The legislative body In the Evangelical Church in Prussia was called Generalsynode between 1846 and 1953.

The governing body of the Reformed Church in America, a Calvinist denomination in the United States and Canada, is known as the General Synod.

Kirkemøtet, the governing body of the Church of Norway, is normally translated as General Synod. It convenes once a year, and consists of 85 representatives, of whom seven or eight are sent from each of the dioceses.

The Batak Christian Protestant Church (BPCP), or Huria Kristen Batak Protestan (abbreviated HKBP), held a twice-a-year General Synod (Sinode Godang), to discuss about matters in HKBP, and to elect the new Ephorus (or Board) for the HKBP. The first General Synod of HKBP was held in 1922.

== Other uses ==
In North America, the Evangelical Lutheran General Synod of the United States of North America, often referred to as the General Synod, was a Lutheran church body that existed from 1820 to 1918.

== See also ==
- Structure of the Church of England
- List of Church of England measures
- General Assembly (Presbyterian church)
