= Thomas Soo =

Retired Hongkonger Anglican Bishop

The Right Reverend Thomas Soo Yee-Po
- Bishop Emeritus of the Diocese of Western Kowloon
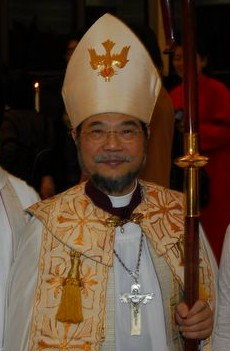
- Undated portrait of Soo sometime before 2008
- Province: Hong Kong Anglican Church
- Diocese: Western Kowloon
- Installed: 18 October 1998
- Term ended: 31 December 2011
- Predecessor: Andrew Chan
- Other post: area bishop for Kowloon West (1995–1998)

Orders
- Ordination: 1979
- Consecration: 1995

Personal details
- Born: Chinese: 蘇以葆 (Soo Yee-Po); 1941 (age 84–85) Hong Kong

Thomas Soo Yee-Po JP (Chinese: 蘇以葆; born 2 March 1941) is a retired Anglican bishop who served as the first Bishop of the Diocese of Western Kowloon in the Hong Kong Anglican Church from 1998 to 2011.

== Career ==
Soo was consecrated a bishop on 30 November 1995 at St John's Cathedral (Hong Kong); and served as an area bishop for Kowloon West & New Territories West (in the Diocese of Hong Kong and Macao) in anticipation of the diocese's split, at which point he became a diocesan bishop.

In 2007, he led a nine-person delegation from Hong Kong to visit Ecumenical Patriarch Bartholomew I of Constantinople to discuss unity between churches.

In 2009, Soo gave a speech regarding religion harmony and peace in mainland China.

He was the chairman of the Hong Kong Christian Council until 2010.

Soo was succeeded by Andrew Chan in 2012. He is now the Honorary Chaplain in All Saints' Cathedral, Diocese of Western Kowloon.

== See also ==
- Diocese of Western Kowloon

Anglican Communion titles
| New diocese | Bishop of the Anglican Diocese of Western Kowloon; 1998 – 2011 | Succeeded by Andrew Chan |
