= Andrew Chan (bishop) =

Chinese bishop (born 1962)

The Most Reverend Andrew Chan Au-Ming CStJ
- Archbishop and Primate of Hong Kong; Bishop of Western Kowloon; Bishop of Macau
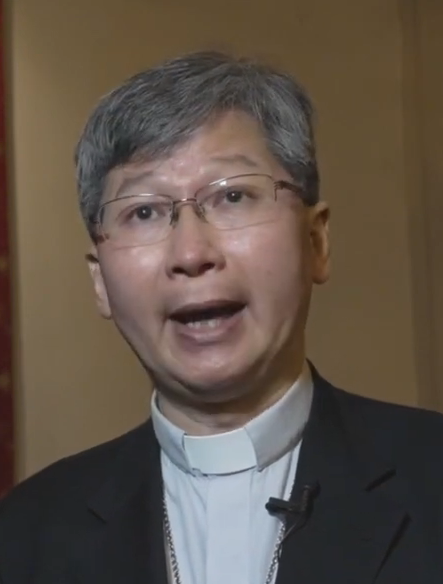
- Province: Hong Kong
- Diocese: Western Kowloon
- Installed: 3 January 2021 (as Archbishop of Hong Kong); 26 March 2012 (as Bishop of Western Kowloon)
- Predecessor: Paul Kwong (as Archbishop of Hong Kong); Thomas Soo (as Bishop of Western Kowloon)

Orders
- Ordination: 1992
- Consecration: 2012

Personal details
- Born: 1962 (age 63–64) Hong Kong
- Denomination: Anglican
- Education: Heythrop Coll., London; Salisbury & Wells Theol. Coll. Newcastle University; Grantham Coll. of Education

Andrew Chan
- Traditional Chinese: 陳謳明
- Simplified Chinese: 陈讴明
Transcriptions
Standard Mandarin
- Hanyu Pinyin: Chén Ōu Míng
- IPA: [ʈʂʰə̌n óʊmǐŋ]
Yue: Cantonese
- Jyutping: can4 au1 ming4

Andrew Chan Au-ming (Chinese: 陳謳明; born 6 January 1962) is the Archbishop of Hong Kong and Primate of Hong Kong Sheng Kung Hui (Anglican Church of Hong Kong) since January 2021 and the Bishop of its Western Kowloon diocese since March 2012.

Ordained as deacon in 1991 and priest in 1992, Chan served as priest-in-charge of Holy Spirit Church, vicar of St. Luke's Church becoming the first Chinese dean of St. John's Cathedral.

== Biography ==
Chan trained as a music teacher in Grantham College of Education before going up to the University of Newcastle as an undergraduate. He did his theological training at Salisbury and Wells Theological College (1989–1991; now named as Sarum College), wherein he founded his ministry and forged a connection between Hong Kong and Salisbury. He furthered his studies in Heythrop College, University of London, in 2003 and graduated with a Master of Arts degree in Pastoral Theology in 2004.

Previous church roles held by Chan include Bishop's Chaplain, Diocesan Secretary and Provincial Secretary. Soon after the inauguration of the Anglican Communion's province of Hong Kong and Macao the Sheng Kung Hui in 1998, he assisted the Archbishop Peter Kwong in establishing the administration system of the Provincial Office and building an effective network with diocesan and missionary offices to maintain mutual support amongst all areas of the Church in Hong Kong. He has been involved in maintaining the connection between the province of Hong Kong and Macao, Sheng Kung Hui and office of the provinces of the Global Anglican Communion. He was appointed Dean of St John's Cathedral in May 2005 and was made Canon in November 2006.

Chan was elected bishop of the Diocese of West Kowloon in June 2011, consecrated on 25 March 2012 and enthroned on 26 March 2012. He was the Secretary General of the General Synod of the Sheng Kung Hui and took part in various diocesan and provincial bodies. He is Chairman of the Diocesan Worship Committee and SKH Primary School Council, Hon. Secretary of the Provincial Standing Committee and SKH Executive Committee, and member of the Provincial Finance Board, Provincial Constitution and Canon Commission, Liturgical Commission, Theological Education Commission, Diocesan Standing Committee and Diocesan Constitution and Canon Committee.

In October 2012, Chan was appointed Sarum Canon, an honorary position on Salisbury Cathedral's College of Canons. In March 2013, he was elected an Honorary Fellow of what is now the Education University of Hong Kong.

On 18 October 2020, the bishop was elected the next Archbishop of the Hong Kong Sheng Kung Hui, succeeding Paul Kwong. Chan was installed as the Primate of Hong Kong on 3 January 2021.

== Honours ==
- : Commander of the Order of St John (2025)

Hong Kong Sheng Kung Hui titles
Preceded by Paul Kwong	Archbishop of Hong Kong; 2021–	Incumbent
Preceded by Paul Kwong	Bishop of Macau; 2021–	Incumbent
Preceded by Thomas Soo	Bishop of Western Kowloon; 2012–	Incumbent
Preceded by Stephen Sidebotham	Dean of St John's Cathedral; 2007–2012	Succeeded by Matthias Der
Order of precedence
Preceded by Thomas Gnocchi; Head of Office of the European Commission in Hong Kong	Hong Kong order of precedence Archbishop of Hong Kong	Succeeded by Kuan Yun; President of the Hong Kong Buddhist Association
