= All Saints' Cathedral, Hong Kong =

Cathedral of the Diocese of Western Kowloon of the Hong Kong Anglican Church

Coordinates: 22.3174°N 114.1734°E

- Traditional Chinese: 諸聖座堂
- Simplified Chinese: 诸圣座堂
- Cantonese Yale: jyū shing dzoh tòhng
Transcriptions
Standard Mandarin
- Hanyu Pinyin: Zhū Shèng Zuò Táng
Yue: Cantonese
- Yale Romanization: jyū shing dzoh tòhng
- Jyutping: zyu1 shing3 zo6 tong4

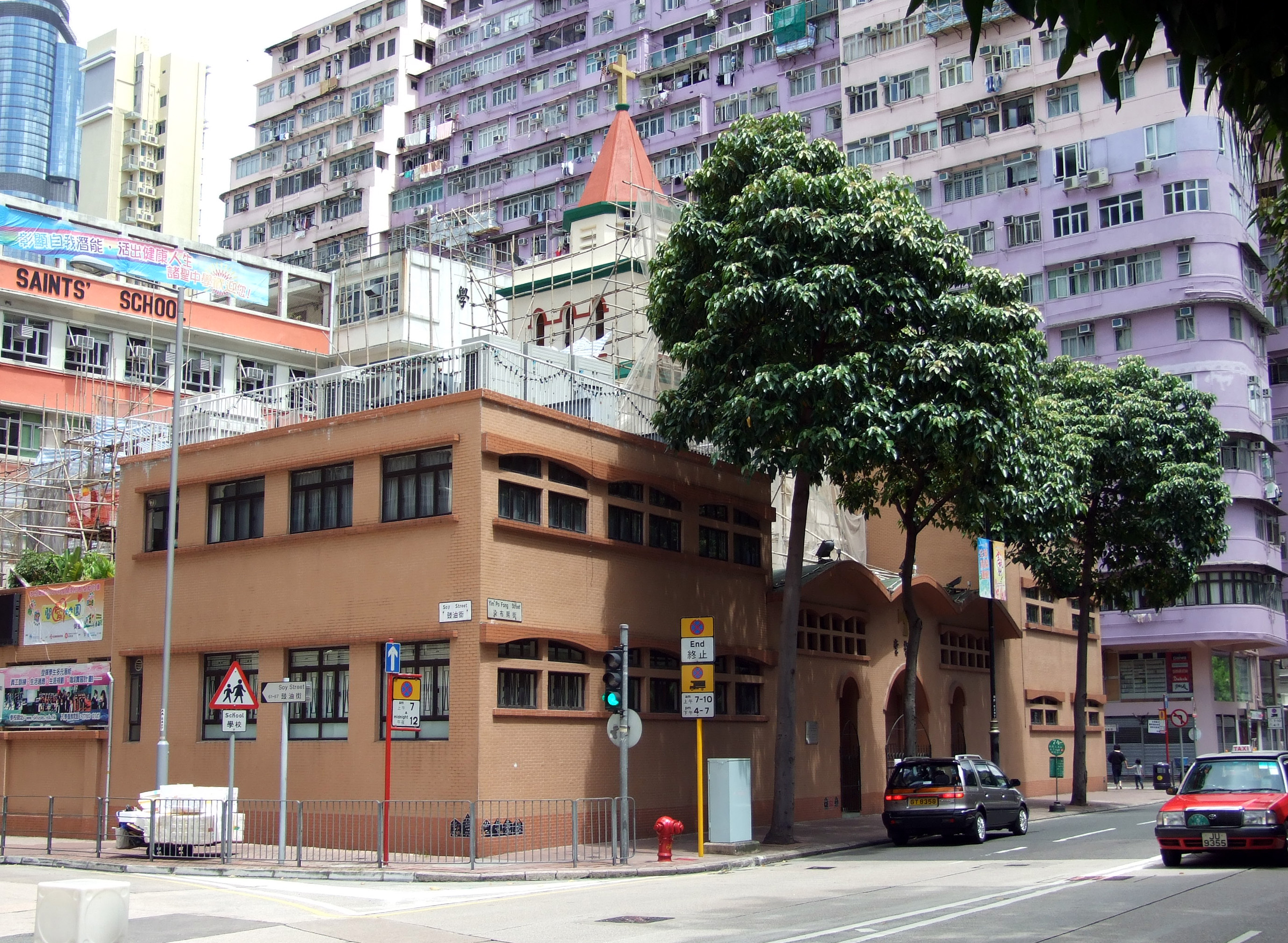
All Saints' Cathedral

All Saints' Cathedral (Chinese: 諸聖座堂) is an Anglican (Episcopal) church at 11 Pak Po Street and 2 Yim Po Fong Street (KIL no. 2625), in Mong Kok, Kowloon, Hong Kong. It was founded in Yau Ma Tei in 1891 on All Saints' Day.

In 2010, the church was consecrated a cathedral. One of the three Anglican cathedrals in the territory and the ecclesiastical province, it is the seat of the bishop of the Anglican Diocese of Western Kowloon, which covers Kowloon and New Kowloon to the west of the Kowloon–Canton Railway, and western half of the New Territories excluding the Islands District and the island of Ma Wan. The other two cathedrals are St. John's Cathedral (Diocese of Hong Kong) and the Holy Trinity Cathedral (Eastern Kowloon).

== History ==
The current church building dates from 1928 and is the oldest church in the diocese. In 1922 the church started arranging land on which the church could be built. In 1934, the All Saints' Middle School [yue] was built next to the church to provide education for local children and to use as a centre for evangelism work. During the Japanese occupation of Hong Kong in 1941 to 1945, the church was confiscated by the Japanese. After the Second World War, the church building was allowed to be used by believers again. In 1951, two more school buildings were built next to the church. Since 1961, the school complex has included a playgroup, a primary school and a secondary school.
