= Archbishop of Hong Kong =

- Archbishopric

Anglican
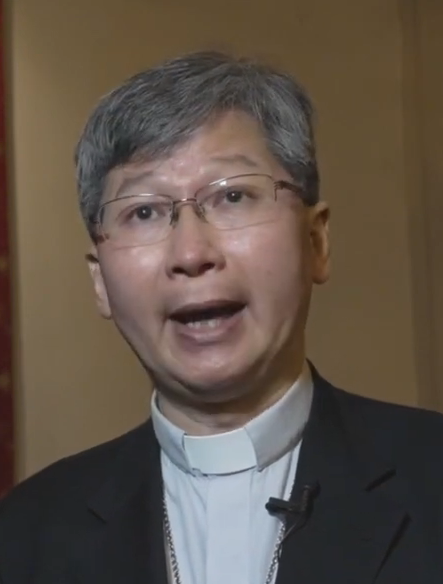
- Incumbent: Andrew Chan

Location
- Country: Hong Kong
- Residence: Bishop's House

Information
- Established: 1998

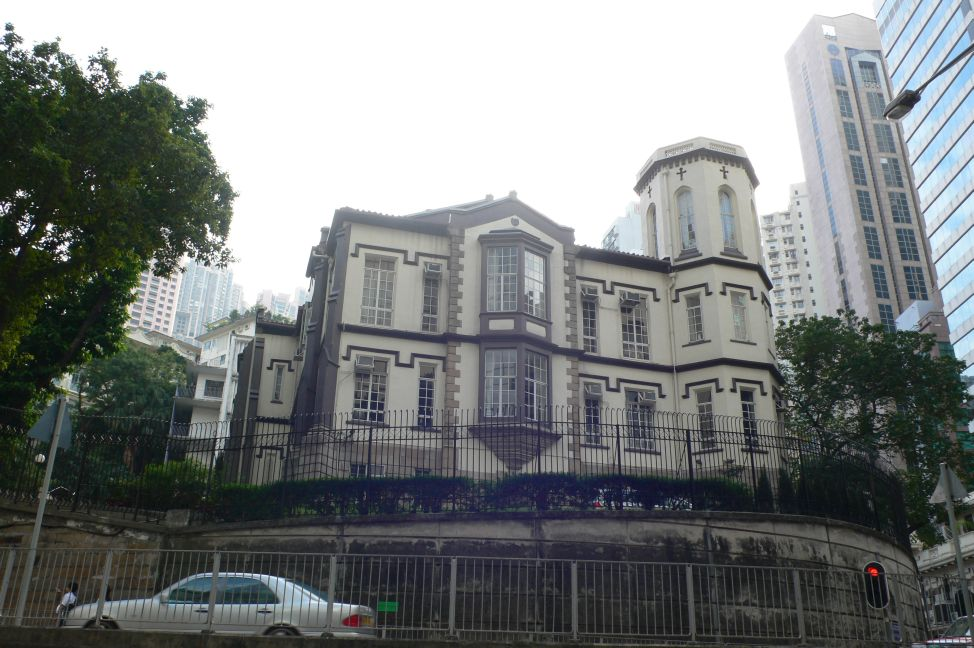
The Bishop's House, office and residence of the Archbishop

The Archbishop of Hong Kong (香港聖公會大主教) is the senior bishop, and spiritual and moral leader of the Anglican Province of the Hong Kong Sheng Kung Hui and the Primate of Hong Kong (教省主教長). The archbishop of the province is elected from among the diocesan bishops by the General Synod in which all Houses meet in a joint session. It is notable that the archbishop ranks first among the religious leaders in the order of precedence of Hong Kong.

The current Archbishop of Hong Kong is Andrew Chan who also serves as the Bishop of Western Kowloon. The Bishop's House, located in Central, is the office and official residence of the archbishop.

== Functions and duties ==
The archbishop chairs the meeting of the Provincial General Synod. As the chief pastor of the province, he is responsible for:

- speaking in the name of the Church or the General Synod;
- giving leadership in initiating and developing policy and strategy of the Church, including implementation of resolutions of the General Synod throughout the Church;
- representing the Province in its relationship with the rest of the Anglican Communion and with other churches, and on behalf of the Province, communicating with other primates;
- ordering for the consecration and installation of Diocesan Bishops when duly elected, and from time to time, assembling other bishops to meet with the new Diocesan bishop;
- convening and presiding over the meetings of the General Synod, the House of Bishops, and the Standing Committee;
- visiting every Diocese, Missionary Diocese and Missionary Area and holding pastoral consultations with the Bishops thereof;
- preaching the Word; and
- celebrating Sacraments.

== List of archbishops ==
Archbishops of Hong Kong
| From | Until | Incumbent | | Notes |
|---|---|---|---|---|
| 1998 | 2007 | Peter Kwong | 鄺廣傑 | Previously Bishop of Hong Kong and Macao; also Bishop of Hong Kong Island from 1998. |
| 2007 | 2021 | Paul Kwong | 鄺保羅 | Also Bishop of Hong Kong Island from 2007. |
| 2021 | | Andrew Chan | 陳謳明 | Also Bishop of Western Kowloon from 2012. |
