= Diocese of Western Kowloon =

Diocese of Western Kowloon 西九龍教區

Location
- Territory: Western Kowloon; Western New Territories (excluding the outlying islands)
- Ecclesiastical province: Hong Kong
- Headquarters: All Saints' Cathedral

Statistics
- Parishes: 10
- Churches: 12
- Schools: 37

Information
- Denomination: Anglican
- Rite: Use of Salisbury
- Established: 18 October 1998
- Cathedral: All Saints' Cathedral

Current leadership
- Bishop: Andrew Chan Au-ming
- Dean: Fan Chun-ho, Samson Jeremiah
- Bishops emeritus: Thomas Soo Yee-po

Website
- http://dwk.hkskh.org/

Diocese of Western Kowloon
- Traditional Chinese: 西九龍教區
- Simplified Chinese: 西九龙教区
Transcriptions
Standard Mandarin
- Hanyu Pinyin: Xī Jiǔlóng Jiàoqū
Yue: Cantonese
- Jyutping: sai1 gau2 lung4 gaau3 keoi1

The Diocese of Western Kowloon is one of the three dioceses under the Hong Kong Sheng Kung Hui. Its territory covers most of western Kowloon and the western New Territories (excluding the outlying islands of Hong Kong). All Saints' Church was established in 1891, making it one of the oldest Anglican churches in Hong Kong; it was consecrated as a cathedral on 31 October 2010.

Incumbent bishop, Andrew Chan, was elected on 26 June 2011 and consecrated on 25 March 2012 to replace the previous bishop, Thomas Soo.

Bishops
Name	Years in office
Thomas Soo Yee-po	1998–2012
Andrew Chan Au-ming	2012–

== Churches ==
The diocese oversees over 12 churches and chapels across western Kowloon and western New Territories (excluding the outlying islands of Hong Kong).

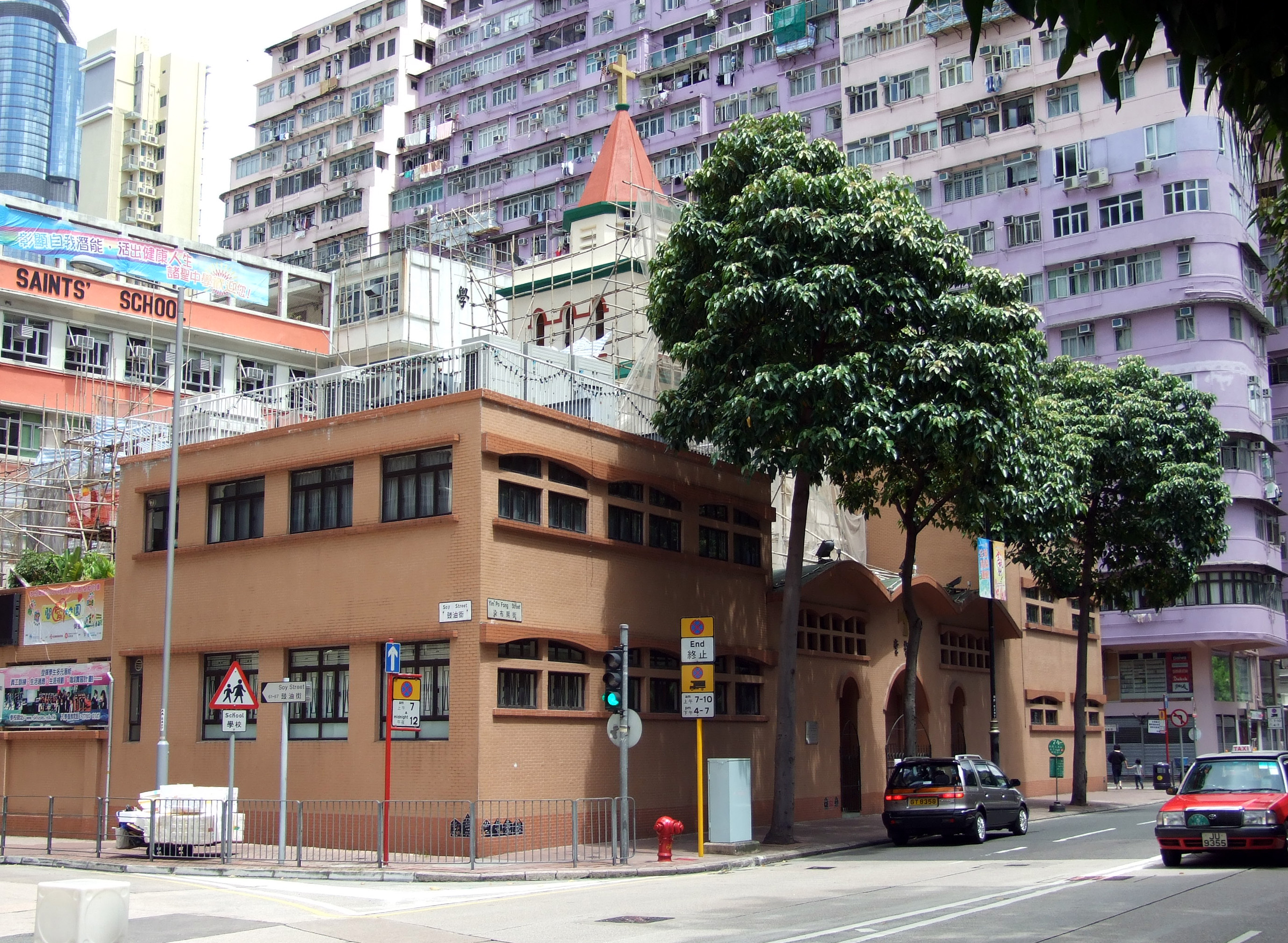
All Saints' Cathedral

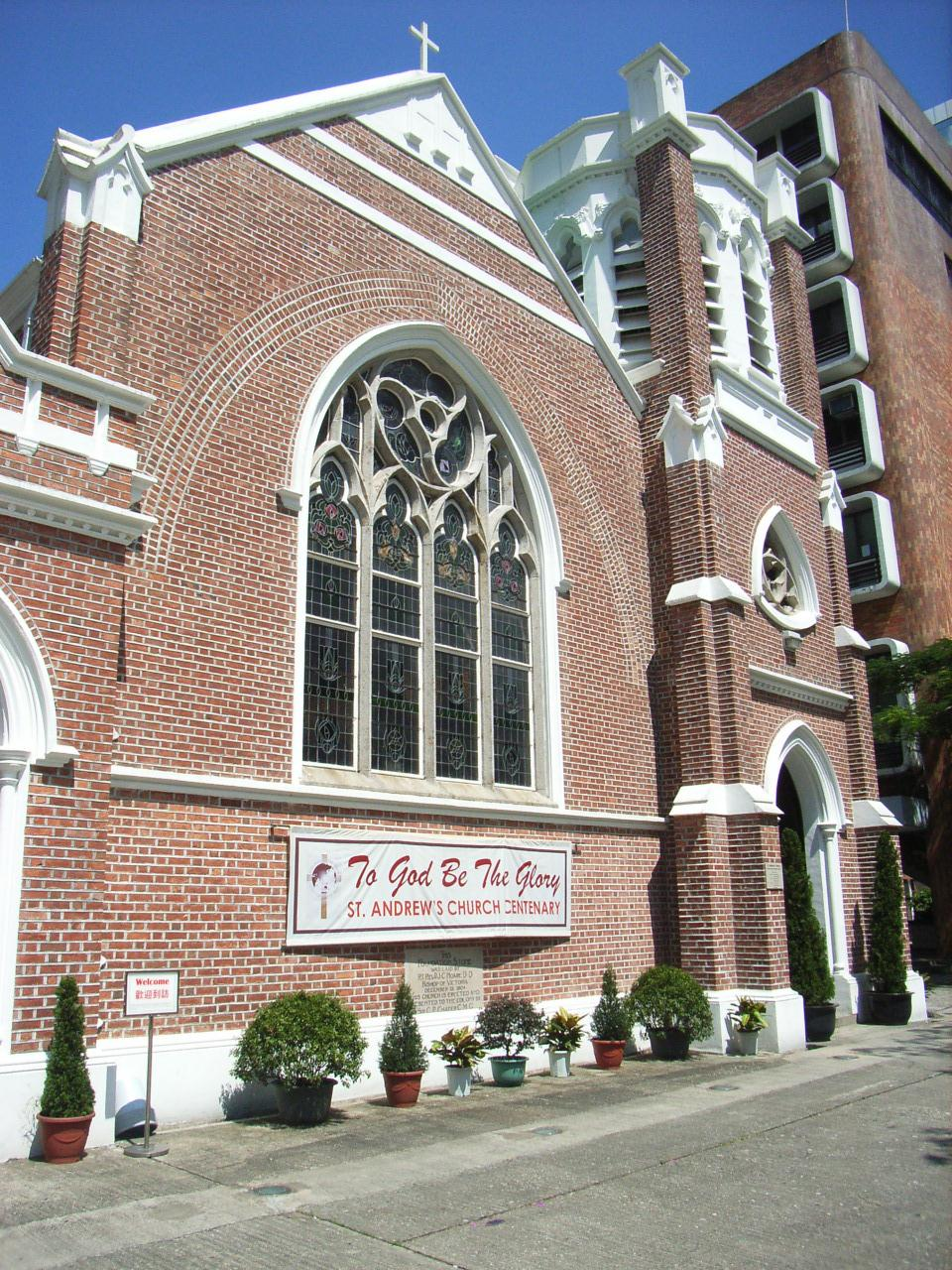
St. Andrew's Church

=== Parishes ===
- All Saints' Cathedral, Mong Kok
- St. Andrew's Church, Tsim Sha Tsui
- St. Thomas' Church, Sham Shui Po
- Kei Oi Church, Cheung Sha Wan
- St. Matthias' Church, Yuen Long
- St. Peter's Church, Castle Peak
- Crown of Thorns' Church, Tsuen Wan
- St. Joseph's Church, Kam Tin
- St. Philip's Church, Tin Shui Wai
- The Church of Epiphany, Tsing Yi

=== Missions ===
- The Church of Shalom, Sham Shui Po
- Church of the Divine Love, Kwai Chung

== See also ==
- Diocese of Hong Kong Island
- Diocese of Eastern Kowloon
- List of Anglican churches in Hong Kong
- Anglican Communion
