= General Synod of Hong Kong Sheng Kung Hui =

Tricameral synod of the Anglican Communion in Hong Kong

The General Synod of Hong Kong Sheng Kung Hui (Chinese: 香港聖公會總議會) exercises the metropolitical authority of the Anglican Province of Hong Kong Sheng Kung Hui. It is a tricameral synod which governs the Province and has the final authority in all matters affecting life, order and canonical discipline of the Church. Its chairperson is the Archbishop of Hong Kong.

== Composition ==
The General Synod is composed of:

- the House of Bishops which shall consist of the Archbishop, Diocesan Bishops, Missionary Diocesan Bishop and Assistant Bishops;
- the House of Clergy which shall consist of six members from and elected by each Diocese; and one member from the Missionary Area of Macau; and
- the House of Laity which shall consist of fifteen lay delegates from and elected by each Diocese of the Province, and two lay delegates from and elected by the Missionary Area of Macau.

== Recent actions ==
The 4th General Synod of Hong Kong Sheng Kung Hui at its meeting on 15 October 2007 adopted a resolution. It is resolved that the Anglican Church in Hong Kong and Macau supports the recommendations contained in the Windsor Report so as to safeguard the unity of the Anglican Communion.

== See also ==
- Hong Kong Sheng Kung Hui
