= Hong Kong Sheng Kung Hui =

Anglican Church of Hong Kong and Macao

- Abbreviation: HKSKH
- Classification: Protestant (with various theological and doctrinal identities, including Anglo-Catholic, Liberal and Evangelical)
- Orientation: Anglican
- Scripture: Holy Bible
- Theology: Anglican doctrine
- Polity: Episcopal
- Primate: Andrew Chan
- Associations: Anglican Communion; Hong Kong Christian Council
- Headquarters: 1 Lower Albert Road, Central, Hong Kong
- Territory: Hong Kong; Macau
- Origin: 1843; 183 years ago (Appointment of first Colonial Chaplain); 25 October 1998; 27 years ago (Establishment of the Province)
- Other name: Hong Kong Anglican Church (Episcopal)
- Official website: www.hkskh.org

Hong Kong Sheng Kung Hui
- Traditional Chinese: 香港聖公會
- Simplified Chinese: 香港圣公会
Transcriptions
Standard Mandarin
- Hanyu Pinyin: Xiānggǎng Shènggōnghuì
- Bopomofo: ㄒㄧㄤ ㄍㄤˇ ㄕㄥˋ ㄍㄨㄥ ㄏㄨㄟˋ
- Wade–Giles: Hsiang^{1}-kang^{3} Sheng^{4}-kung^{1}-hui^{4}
- Yale Romanization: Syānggǎng Shèngūnghwèi
- IPA: [ɕjáŋkàŋ ʂə̂ŋkʊ́ŋxwêɪ]
Yue: Cantonese
- Yale Romanization: Heūnggóng Singgōngwuì
- Jyutping: hoeng^{1} gong^{2} sing^{3} gong^{1} wui^{2}
- IPA: Cantonese pronunciation: [hœ́ŋkɔ̌ːŋ.ɕɪ̄ŋkɔ́ːŋwǔːi]

The Hong Kong Sheng Kung Hui (abbreviated SKH), also known as the Hong Kong Anglican Church (Episcopal), is the Anglican church in Hong Kong and Macao. It is the 38th Province of the Anglican Communion. It is also one of the major denominations in Hong Kong and the first in the Anglican Communion to ordain a female priest.

The Province of Hong Kong Sheng Kung Hui is divided into three dioceses in Hong Kong and one missionary area in Macau. Each diocese is led by a bishop and the missionary area is directly led by the Archbishop.

The primate of Hong Kong Sheng Kung Hui holds the title of Archbishop of Hong Kong, and is elected from the diocesan bishops of the province. Andrew Chan is the current Archbishop and Primate and Bishop of Western Kowloon. Timothy Kwok is Bishop of Eastern Kowloon and Matthias Der is Bishop of Hong Kong Island. Peter Douglas Koon is the provincial secretary general. The church has approximately 29,000 members.

== Anglican Communion ==
The Anglican Communion is a global family and a fellowship of churches which trace their roots to the Church of England, with a province being a basic autonomous unit. There are presently 41 independent and self-governing provinces spanning over 160 countries. With well over 100 million members, the Anglican Communion is the third largest church in the world, after the Catholic Church and the Eastern Orthodox Churches.

In the Anglican Communion, there is no central governing authority. Churches uphold and proclaim the Catholic and Apostolic faith. The front-line unit of Church is the "parish". Parishes of similar vicinity are then grouped together to form a "diocese". Dioceses sharing similar cultural and national background would unite and form a "province", participating in the Anglican Communion under the leadership and jurisdiction of an archbishop.

The Four Instruments of Unity for the Anglican Communion:

1. The Archbishop of Canterbury,
2. The Anglican Consultative Council, which is organized once every three years,
3. Lambeth Conference, a global Anglican bishops' meeting which is held once every ten years, and
4. Primates' Meeting, the meeting of the most senior leaders of the church, which is held at least on an annual basis.

== Anglican faith ==
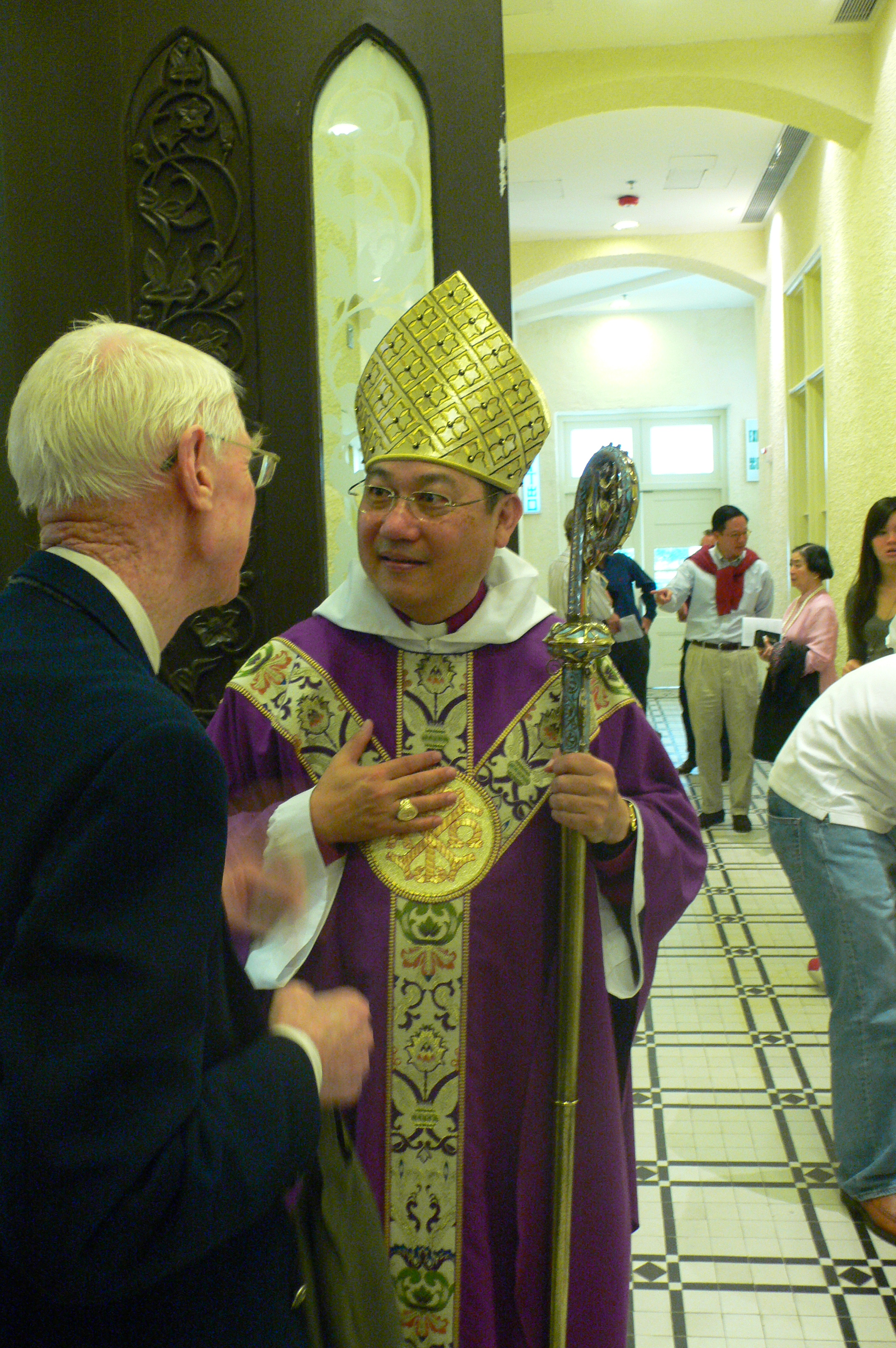
Paul Kwong, Primate and Archbishop of Hong Kong

The Anglican faith is based on the belief that the Bible, the Holy Scriptures of the Old and the New Testaments, "contain[s] all things necessary to salvation". Hong Kong Sheng Kung Hui further maintains the ministry of the Church which it has received through the Episcopacy in the three orders of Bishops, Priests, and Deacons.

== History and origin ==
Sheng Kung Hui was founded in British Hong Kong in 1843, following the Treaty of Nanking. The first colonial chaplain was Vincent John Stanton. The first Chinese church, St. Stephen's Church, was founded in 1865. From then onwards, in the course of development of the Anglican Church in Hong Kong and Macao, churches continued to grow and witnessed the establishment of the Diocese of Victoria (Chinese: 維多利亞教區) in 1849 under the See of Canterbury; the establishment of the Kong Yuet Diocese (Chinese: 港粵教區) under the province of the Chung Hua Sheng Kung Hui in 1913, which ran in parallel with the Diocese of Victoria, until it resolved in 1951; and the birth of the Diocese of Hong Kong and Macao in 1951, which was subsequently completely separated from the national Chung Hua Sheng Kung Hui.

In the 40th Synod of the Diocese held in December 1991, it was resolved that steps were to be taken to expand the Diocese into a province and eventually in 1998, the province of Hong Kong Sheng Kung Hui was established.

== Bishops ==
=== Diocese of Hong Kong and Macao ===
- Ronald Owen Hall (1951–1966)
- Gilbert Baker (1966–1980)
- Peter Kwong Kong-kit (1980–1998)

=== Hong Kong Sheng Kung Hui ===
==== Archbishop and Primate of Hong Kong ====
- Peter Kwong Kong-kit (1998–2006)
- Paul Kwong (2007–2021)
- Andrew Chan (2021–present)

==== Bishop of Hong Kong Island ====
- Peter Kwong Kong-kit (1998–2007)
- Paul Kwong (2007–2020)
- Matthias Der (2021–present)

==== Bishop of Western Kowloon ====
- Thomas Soo (1998–2012)
- Andrew Chan (2012–present)

==== Bishop of Eastern Kowloon ====
- Louis Tsui (1998–2013)
- Timothy Kwok (2014–present)

== Structure ==
=== Dioceses and Missionary Area ===
Three dioceses of HKSKH (the Missionary Area of Macau is not shown)

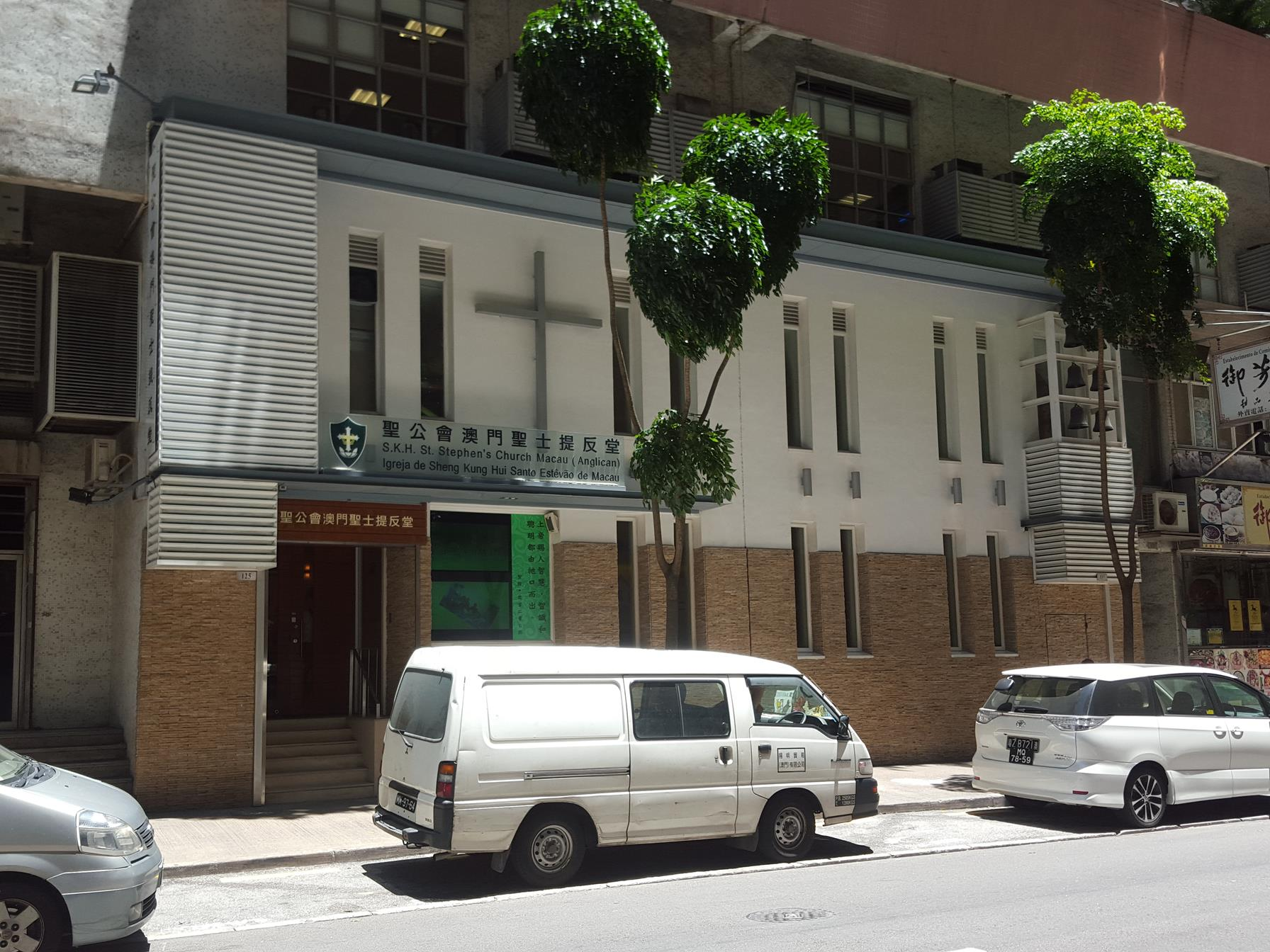
St. Stephen's Church in Macau

Hong Kong Sheng Kung Hui consists of three dioceses and one missionary area. There is a bishop in each diocese. The dioceses are:

- The Diocese of Hong Kong Island (香港島教區)
- The Diocese of Eastern Kowloon (東九龍教區)
- The Diocese of Western Kowloon (西九龍教區)

The missionary area is:

- The Missionary Area of Macao (澳門傳道地區)

=== General synod ===
The Provincial General Synod is composed of the House of Bishop, the House of Clegy and the House of Laity. Members come from the Diocese of Hong Kong Island, the Diocese of Eastern Kowloon, the Diocese of Western Kowloon and the Missionary Area of Macao. Under the General Synod, there are different Commissions responsible for different areas of ministry.

== Mission and pastoral work ==
The Church is a community with no boundaries in age, social or ethnic status. Members include Chinese, other Asians and Westerners from all over the world. The worship in Churches features English, Filipino, Cantonese Chinese and Mandarin Chinese.

Pastoral Care
On the parish level, pastoral care is given through fellowships for children, youth, adults, women, elderly and other related groups to cater to the different needs of people of various age groups and background. Retreats, silent meditation, pilgrimage and tours to Israel are often arranged. Caring for the elderly, family counseling service, spiritual support in hospitals, pastoral care in correctional institutes, mission to Seafarers and religious service at the Airport are some of the Church's services.

Religious Education
Religious education of parishes are carried out by Sunday Schools, seminars, disciple training courses and catechism class, among others. The whole Church relies on the Religious Education and Resource Centre to co-ordinate religious education research, provision of religious education curriculum and promotion of religious education. Besides training ordinands, Ming Hua Theological College also provides multi-faceted theological, spiritual and biblical studies for laity.

== Social service ==
Social service of the Hong Kong Sheng Kung Hui started in mid 18th Century. At present, many social service organizations and social service models in Hong Kong were those initiated and promoted by the Church. Services provided by the Church are multi-faceted, including services for family and child-care, children and youth, the elderly, rehabilitation service, community development service and other supportive services. There are more than 230 units providing social service run by Hong Kong Sheng Kung Hui at present.

In January 2010, the Inland Revenue Department began to pursue the SKH for unpaid taxes in the amount of HK$180 million, relating to a parcel of land in Tai Po which originally housed an orphanage. In 1993, after the closure of the orphanage, the SKH let Cheung Kong Holdings develop luxury apartments on the site, and were estimated to have made profits of HK$450 million in cash, in addition to receiving 120 apartments for free.

== Social issues ==
On women's ordination, the church was the first in the Anglican Communion to ordain women to the priesthood: Florence Li Tim-Oi in 1944 and another in 1971. Churches in Hong Kong and "Christian clerics are often divided on topics such as... gay rights". In 2007, the former primate, Archbishop Peter Kwong, stated that "Anglicanism is inclusive...so why shouldn't we find a common ground on homosexuality?". Beginning in 2013, some leaders in the Hong Kong Anglican Church endorsed social and civil rights legislation under the auspice of providing protection for LGBT citizens from employment and other varieties of discrimination. The Equal Opportunity Commission chair, York Chow Yat-ngok, who is Anglican, said that gay "people should not be discriminated against" regardless of religious views. Later, in 2015, Peter Douglas Koon, the Anglican province's secretary general, denounced conservative schools' policies against LGBT relationships as discrimination and reassured the public that Anglican educational institutions would welcome LGBT faculty and students.

== Education ==
There are altogether 33 secondary schools sponsored by Sheng Kung Hui in the territory, amongst which namely:

=== Primary schools ===
- Sheng Kung Hui Chu Oi Primary School
- Sheng Kung Hui Chu Oi Primary School (Lei Muk Shue)
- Sheng Kung Hui Ho Chak Wan Primary School
- Sheng Kung Hui Kei Oi Primary School
- Sheng Kung Hui Tsing Yi Estate Ho Chak Wan Primary School
- Sheng Kung Hui Tsing Yi Chu Yan Primary School
- Sheng Kung Hui Holy Spirit Primary School
- Sheng Kung Hui MOS Holy Spirit Primary School
- Sheng Kung Hui Holy Trinity Primary School
- Sheng Kung Hui St Clement's Primary School
- Sheng Kung Hui St. Peter's Primary School

=== Secondary schools ===
- Chan Young Secondary School
- Diocesan Boys' School
- Diocesan Girls' School
- Heep Yunn School
- Holy Trinity Church Secondary School
- Lam Woo Memorial Secondary School
- St. Mark's School
- Bishop Mok Sau Tseng Secondary School
- St. Paul's Co-educational College
- St. Paul's College
- St. Stephen's College
- St. Stephen's Girls' College
- Tang Shiu Kin Secondary School
- Tsang Shiu Tim Secondary School

=== Education reform controversy ===
Hong Kong Sheng Kung Hui, with its sponsored primary and secondary schools, were embroiled in the School-Based Management Policy controversy with the government in 2002, five years after the handover.

=== SKH Ming Hua Theological College ===
Hong Kong Sheng Kung Hui runs its own theological college: Ming Hua Theological College, named after Bishop Ronald Owen Hall. Ming Hua College was established in 1947 by Bishop R.O. Hall in what was then the Church of England's Diocese of Victoria. It was at first dedicated to the education of Chinese lay Christians, particularly from disadvantaged backgrounds. In 1996, now part of the Diocese of Hong Kong and Macao, the college was renamed Sheng Kung Hui ("Holy Catholic Church") Ming Hua Theological College and given the responsibility of training priests for full-time ministry in the Church. This work continues today as part of the Anglican Province of Hong Kong and Macao, with Ming Hua being the Provincial training centre for clergy and laity.

== See also ==
- Acts of Supremacy
- English Reformation
- Dissolution of the Monasteries
- Ritualism in the Church of England
- Apostolicae curae
- Christianity in Hong Kong
- Roman Catholic Diocese of Hong Kong
