= List of Executive Council of Hong Kong unofficial members 1946–1997 =

This is the list of the unofficial members of the Executive Council of Hong Kong (ExCo) from 1946 the reestablishment of the civil government of the British Hong Kong until the handover of Hong Kong to Chinese sovereignty in 1997. Information is generated from the Hong Kong government's annual reports.

== Change in composition ==
| Year | Number of Official Members exclusive of the Governor | Number of Unofficial Members |
|---|---|---|
| 1946 | 6 | 4 |
| 1947 | 6 | 6 |
| 1966 | 6 | 8 |
| 1978 | 6 | 9 |
| 1983 | 6 | 11 |
| 1984 | 6 | 10 |
| 1985 | 6 | 8 |
| 1986 | 6 | 10 |
| 1987 | 5 | 9 |
| 1989 | 5 | 10 |
| 1991 | 5 | 9 |
| 1992 | 7 | 9 |
| 1993 | 4 | 9 |

== List of the Unofficial Members of the Executive Council ==
| Members | Assumed office | Left office | Background | Remarks |
|---|---|---|---|---|
| Arthur Morse | 28 May 1946 | 1953 | Hongkong and Shanghai Banking Corporation | Senior Unofficial Member (1946–53) |
| David Fortune Landale | 28 May 1946 | 1951 | Jardine, Matheson & Co. | |
| Chau Tsun-nin | 28 May 1946 | 28 May 1959 | Barrister | Senior Unofficial Member (1953–59) |
| Lo Man-kam | 28 May 1946 | 7 March 1959 | Barrister | Died in office |
| Duncan John Sloss | 1947 | 1949 | | |
| Chau Sik-nin | 1947 | 28 May 1962 | Doctor | Senior Unofficial Member (1959–62) |
| Leo d'Almada e Castro | 1949 | 27 May 1959 | Barrister | Portuguese representative |
| Philip Stanley Cassidy | July 1951 | 30 April 1952 | John D Hutchison & Co. | |
| John Keswick | 20 June 1952 | 1956 | Jardine, Matheson & Co. | |
| Cedric Blaker | 1954 | 1955 | Gilman & Co. | |
| Michael William Turner | 30 May 1954 | 1962 | Hongkong and Shanghai Banking Corporation | |
| Charles Edward Michael Terry | 1956 | 28 May 1961 | Businessman | |
| Hugh David MacEwen Barton | 10 July 1957 | 29 September 1957 | Jardine, Matheson & Co. | Provisionally during the absence of Michael William Turner |
| Hugh David MacEwen Barton | 20 May 1959 | 9 October 1959 | Jardine, Matheson & Co. | Provisionally during the absence of Michael William Turner |
| Hugh David MacEwen Barton | 30 January 1960 | 16 February 1960 | Jardine, Matheson & Co. | Provisionally during the absence of Michael William Turner |
| Hugh David MacEwen Barton | 17 March 1960 | 17 May 1960 | Jardine, Matheson & Co. | Provisionally during the absence of Michael William Turner |
| Hugh David MacEwen Barton | 14 March 1962 | 18 June 1963 | Jardine, Matheson & Co. | Replaced Michael William Turner |
| Kwok Chan | 28 May 1959 | 24 July 1959 | | Provisionally during the absence of Lo Man-wai |
| Kwok Chan | 15 February 1960 | 7 March 1960 | | Provisionally during the absence of Chau Sik-nin |
| Kwok Chan | 1 July 1960 | 14 September 1960 | | Provisionally during the absence of Chau Sik-nin |
| Lo Man-wai | 28 May 1959 | 28 May 1961 | Barrister | Replaced Chau Tsun-nin |
| Ngan Shing-kwan | 28 May 1959 | 28 May 1961 | Businessman | Replaced Lo Man-kam died in office; retired on 21 June 1961 |
| Alberto Maria Rodrigues | 28 May 1959 | 30 April 1974 | Doctor | Senior Unofficial Member (1962–74); Portuguese representative; replaced Leo d'Almada e Castro |
| George Osborne Wauchope Stewart | 15 November 1960 | 21 January 1961 | | Provisionally during the absence of Michael William Turner |
| George Osborne Wauchope Stewart | 18 March 1961 | 14 April 1961 | | Provisionally during the absence of Michael William Turner |
| Richard Charles Lee | 28 May 1961 | 28 May 1966 | Businessman | Replaced Charles Edward Michael Terry |
| Kwan Cho-yiu | 28 May 1961 | 7 December 1971 | | Replaced Lo Man-wai; died in office |
| John Douglas Clague | 28 May 1961 | 30 April 1974 | John D Hutchison & Co. | Replaced Ngan Shing-kwan |
| William Charles Goddard Knowles | 15 June 1962 | 15 September 1962 | Butterfield & Swire | Provisionally during the absence of Hugh David MacEwen Barton and John Douglas Clague |
| William Charles Goddard Knowles | 18 June 1963 | 1 July 1965 | Butterfield & Swire | Replaced Hugh David MacEwen Barton |
| Kenneth Fung Ping-fan | 28 May 1962 | 30 June 1972 | Businessman | Replaced Chau Sik-nin |
| Kan Yuet-keung | 28 July 1963 | 28 August 1963 | Barrister | Provisionally during the absence of Richard Charles Lee |
| Kan Yuet-keung | 30 August 1963 | 24 September 1963 | Barrister | Provisionally during the absence of Kwan Cho-yiu |
| Kan Yuet-keung | 10 October 1963 | 18 November 1963 | Barrister | Provisionally during the absence of Kenneth Fung Ping-fan |
| Kan Yuet-keung | 13 May 1965 | 12 June 1965 | Barrister | Provisionally during the absence of Richard Charles Lee |
| Kan Yuet-keung | 21 July 1965 | 15 August 1965 | Barrister | Provisionally during the absence of Kwan Cho-yiu |
| Kan Yuet-keung | 28 May 1966 | 31 March 1980 | Barrister | Replaced Richard Charles Lee; Senior Unofficial Member (1974–80) |
| Sidney Samuel Gordon | 3 October 1963 | 7 December 1963 | Kadoorie Group | Provisionally during the absence of William Charles Goddard Knowles |
| Sidney Samuel Gordon | 9 December 1963 | 21 January 1964 | Kadoorie Group | Provisionally during the absence of John Douglas Clague |
| Sidney Samuel Gordon | 10 April 1964 | 9 May 1964 | Kadoorie Group | Provisionally during the absence of John Douglas Clague |
| Sidney Samuel Gordon | 2 March 1964 | 17 March 1964 | Kadoorie Group | Provisionally during the absence of John Douglas Clague |
| Sidney Samuel Gordon | 6 October 1964 | 25 October 1964 | Kadoorie Group | Provisionally during the absence of William Charles Goddard Knowles |
| Sidney Samuel Gordon | 1 July 1965 | August 1980 | Kadoorie Group | Replaced William Charles Goddard Knowles; Senior Unofficial Member (March–August 1980) |
| Dhun Jehangir Ruttonjee | 22 May 1965 | 1 August 1965 | Businessman | Provisionally during the absence of Alberto Maria Rodrigues |
| George Ronald Ross | 10 July 1965 | 22 September 1965 | Deacon & Co. | Provisionally during the absence of John Douglas Clague |
| George Ronald Ross | 10 May 1966 | 24 August 1966 | Deacon & Co. | Provisionally during the absence of John Douglas Clague |
| George Ronald Ross | 3 September 1966 | 9 October 1966 | Deacon & Co. | Provisionally during the absence of John Anthony Holt Saunders |
| George Ronald Ross | 14 July 1967 | 5 August 1967 | Deacon & Co. | Provisionally during the absence of Sidney Samuel Gordon |
| George Ronald Ross | 20 May 1967 | 13 July 1967 | Deacon & Co. | Provisionally during the absence of John Anthony Holt Saunders |
| George Ronald Ross | 19 September 1967 | 30 September 1967 | Deacon & Co. | Provisionally during the absence of John Anthony Holt Saunders |
| George Ronald Ross | 27 April 1968 | 18 May 1968 | Deacon & Co. | Provisionally during the absence of John Douglas Clague |
| George Ronald Ross | 13 June 1968 | 14 October 1968 | Deacon & Co. | Provisionally during the absence of John Douglas Clague |
| George Ronald Ross | 15 October 1968 | 19 November 1968 | Deacon & Co. | Provisionally during the absence of Sidney Samuel Gordon |
| George Ronald Ross | 2 December 1968 | 12 December 1968 | Deacon & Co. | Provisionally during the absence of John Anthony Holt Saunders |
| George Ronald Ross | 23 June 1969 | 15 August 1969 | Deacon & Co. | Provisionally during the absence of Sidney Samuel Gordon |
| George Ronald Ross | 15 September 1969 | 25 September 1969 | Deacon & Co. | Provisionally during the absence of John Douglas Clague |
| George Ronald Ross | 2 November 1968 | 13 November 1968 | Deacon & Co. | Provisionally during the absence of John Anthony Holt Saunders |
| George Ronald Ross | 17 November 1968 | 27 November 1968 | Deacon & Co. | Provisionally during the absence of John Anthony Holt Saunders |
| George Ronald Ross | 8 August 1970 | 25 September 1970 | Deacon & Co. | Provisionally during the absence of John Anthony Holt Saunders |
| George Ronald Ross | 17 October 1970 | 22 January 1971 | Deacon & Co. | Provisionally during the absence of Sidney Samuel Gordon |
| George Ronald Ross | 10 May 1971 | 30 July 1971 | Deacon & Co. | Provisionally during the absence of John Anthony Holt Saunders |
| George Ronald Ross | 1 August 1971 | 17 September 1971 | Deacon & Co. | Provisionally during the absence of John Douglas Clague |
| George Ronald Ross | 12 November 1971 | 17 November 1971 | Deacon & Co. | Provisionally during the absence of Sidney Samuel Gordon |
| George Ronald Ross | 1 July 1971 | 30 April 1974 | Deacon & Co. | |
| John Anthony Holt Saunders | 1 July 1965 | 30 July 1965 | Hongkong and Shanghai Banking Corporation | Provisionally during the absence of Sidney Samuel Gordon |
| John Anthony Holt Saunders | 28 May 1966 | 30 June 1972 | Hongkong and Shanghai Banking Corporation | |
| Woo Pak-chuen | 25 May 1966 | 19 July 1966 | Barrister | Provisionally during the absence of Kenneth Fung Ping-fan |
| Woo Pak-chuen | 3 April 1967 | 11 April 1967 | Barrister | Provisionally during the absence of Kwan Cho-yiu |
| Woo Pak-chuen | 21 July 1967 | 26 September 1967 | Barrister | Provisionally during the absence of Kwan Cho-yiu |
| Woo Pak-chuen | 31 October 1967 | 1968 | Barrister | Provisionally during the absence of Li Fook-shu |
| Woo Pak-chuen | 16 April 1968 | 26 April 1968 | Barrister | Provisionally during the absence of Kwan Cho-yiu |
| Woo Pak-chuen | 13 September 1968 | 4 October 1968 | Barrister | Provisionally during the absence of Tang Ping-yuan |
| Woo Pak-chuen | 13 October 1968 | 5 November 1968 | Barrister | Provisionally during the absence of Kenneth Fung Ping-fan |
| Woo Pak-chuen | 5 March 1969 | 22 March 1969 | Barrister | Provisionally during the absence of Kwan Cho-yiu |
| Woo Pak-chuen | 24 March 1969 | 16 April 1969 | Barrister | Provisionally during the absence of Kenneth Fung Ping-fan |
| Woo Pak-chuen | 17 May 1969 | 12 June 1969 | Barrister | Provisionally during the absence of Kan Yuet-keung |
| Woo Pak-chuen | 17 July 1969 | 28 August 1969 | Barrister | Provisionally during the absence of Kwan Cho-yiu |
| Woo Pak-chuen | 8 September 1969 | 15 October 1969 | Barrister | Provisionally during the absence of Kenneth Fung Ping-fan |
| Woo Pak-chuen | 30 April 1970 | 27 June 1970 | Barrister | Provisionally during the absence of Kan Yuet-keung |
| Woo Pak-chuen | 12 July 1970 | 18 August 1970 | Barrister | Provisionally during the absence of Kenneth Fung Ping-fan |
| Woo Pak-chuen | 10 October 1970 | 24 October 1970 | Barrister | Provisionally during the absence of Kan Yuet-keung |
| Woo Pak-chuen | 13 March 1971 | 30 March 1971 | Barrister | Provisionally during the absence of Kan Yuet-keung |
| Woo Pak-chuen | 4 June 1971 | 24 July 1971 | Barrister | Provisionally during the absence of Kenneth Fung Ping-fan |
| Woo Pak-chuen | 2 August 1971 | 16 September 1971 | Barrister | Provisionally during the absence of Kan Yuet-keung |
| Woo Pak-chuen | 13 November 1971 | 17 November 1971 | Barrister | Provisionally during the absence of Kan Yuet-keung |
| Woo Pak-chuen | 13 December 1971 | 30 June 1972 | Barrister | Temporarily |
| Woo Pak-chuen | 1 July 1972 | 30 June 1976 | Barrister | |
| Li Fook-shu | 28 May 1966 | June 1968 | Businessman | |
| Kenneth Albert Watson | 11 April 1967 | 3 May 1967 | Businessman | Provisionally during the absence of John Douglas Clague |
| Kenneth Albert Watson | 30 June 1967 | 10 August 1967 | Businessman | Provisionally during the absence of Alberto Maria Rodrigues |
| Kenneth Albert Watson | 25 July 1968 | 20 September 1968 | Businessman | Provisionally during the absence of John Anthony Holt Saunders |
| Szeto Wai | 17 September 1967 | 24 October 1967 | Engineer | Provisionally during the absence of Kenneth Fung Ping-fan |
| Szeto Wai | 21 March 1968 | 26 June 1968 | Engineer | Provisionally during the absence of Kan Yuet-keung |
| Szeto Wai | 23 August 1969 | 7 October 1969 | Engineer | Provisionally during the absence of Tang Ping-yuan |
| Szeto Wai | 6 May 1970 | 16 June 1970 | Engineer | Provisionally during the absence of Kenneth Fung Ping-fan |
| Szeto Wai | 13 December 1971 | 30 June 1972 | Engineer | Temporarily |
| Szeto Wai | 1 July 1972 | 30 June 1976 | Engineer | |
| Tang Ping-yuan | 12 April 1967 | 13 May 1967 | Businessman | Provisionally during the absence of Li Fook-shu |
| Tang Ping-yuan | 18 March 1968 | 11 April 1968 | Businessman | Provisionally during the absence of Kenneth Fung Ping-fan |
| Tang Ping-yuan | June 1968 | 17 June 1971 | Businessman | Replaced Li Fook-shu; died in office |
| Herbert John Charles Browne | 17 August 1968 | 8 September 1968 | John Swire & Sons | Provisionally during the absence of Alberto Maria Rodrigues |
| Herbert John Charles Browne | 20 June 1969 | 12 September 1969 | John Swire & Sons | Provisionally during the absence of John Douglas Clague |
| Herbert John Charles Browne | 30 May 1970 | 27 September 1970 | John Swire & Sons | Provisionally during the absence of John Douglas Clague |
| Herbert John Charles Browne | 7 June 1971 | 23 July 1971 | John Swire & Sons | Provisionally during the absence of Alberto Maria Rodrigues |
| Herbert John Charles Browne | 1 September 1971 | 3 October 1971 | John Swire & Sons | Provisionally during the absence of Sidney Samuel Gordon |
| Michael Alexander Robert Herries | 30 September 1968 | 10 October 1968 | Jardine, Matheson & Co. | Provisionally during the absence of John Anthony Holt Saunders |
| Michael Alexander Robert Herries | 23 June 1969 | 5 August 1969 | Jardine, Matheson & Co. | Provisionally during the absence of John Anthony Holt Saunders |
| Chung Sze-yuen | 22 May 1970 | 30 June 1970 | | Provisionally during the absence of Tang Ping-yuan |
| Chung Sze-yuen | 1 July 1972 | 31 August 1988 | | Senior Unofficial Member (1980–88) |
| Gerald Mordaunt Broome Salmon | 31 May 1971 | 25 July 1971 | Mackinnon, Mackenzie & Co | Provisionally during the absence of John Douglas Clague |
| Ann Tse-kai | 1 July 1974 | 31 August 1978 | Winsor Industrial Corp | |
| Guy Mowbray Sayer | 1 July 1974 | 31 August 1977 | Hongkong and Shanghai Banking Corporation | |
| Oswald Victor Cheung | 1 July 1974 | 31 August 1986 | Barrister | |
| Lee Quo-wei | 1 September 1976 | 31 August 1978 | Hang Seng Bank | |
| Lee Quo-wei | 1 September 1983 | 31 December 1988 | Hang Seng Bank | |
| Catherine Joyce Symons | 1 September 1976 | 31 August 1978 | Educator | |
| John Henry Bremridge | 1 September 1977 | 1980 | Butterfield & Swire | Appointed as the first Financial Secretary with non-civil servant background in 1981 |
| Rogerio Hyndman Lobo | 1 September 1978 | 31 August 1985 | Businessman & Urban Councillor | |
| Li Fook-wo | 1 September 1978 | 31 August 1985 | Businessman | |
| Harry Fang Sin-yang | 1 September 1978 | 31 August 1983 | Surgeon | |
| Michael Graham Ruddock Sandberg | 1 September 1978 | 31 August 1986 | Hongkong and Shanghai Banking Corporation | |
| Lo Tak-shing | 1 April 1980 | 12 February 1985 | Solicitor | Resigned on 12 February 1985 |
| Patrick Terence McGovern | 1 September 1980 | 31 August 1982 | Clergy | |
| David Kennedy Newbigging | 1980 | 1984 | Jardine, Matheson & Co. | |
| Lydia Dunn | 1 September 1982 | 1995 | John Swire & Sons | Senior Member (1988–95) |
| Chen Shou-lum | 1 September 1983 | 31 August 1987 | | |
| Maria Tam Wai-chu | 1 September 1983 | 31 October 1991 | Barrister & Urban Councillor | |
| Allen Lee Peng-fei | 21 June 1985 | 7 October 1992 | Jada Electronics Ltd. | Replaced Li Fook-wo |
| Peter Wong Chak-cheong | 1 September 1986 | 31 August 1988 | Solicitor | |
| Chiu Hin-kwong | 1 September 1986 | 31 October 1988 | Doctor | |
| Daniel Tse Chi-wai | 1 September 1986 | 31 October 1991 | | |
| William Purves | 1 September 1986 | 1993 | Hongkong and Shanghai Banking Corporation | |
| John Joseph Swaine | 1 September 1988 | 31 October 1991 | Barrister | |
| Rosanna Tam Wong Yick-ming | 1 September 1988 | 31 October 1991 | | |
| Rosanna Tam Wong Yick-ming | 7 October 1992 | 30 June 1997 | | Convenor of the Non-official Members (1995–97) |
| Cheng Hon-kwan | 1 October 1988 | 31 October 1991 | | |
| Rita Fan Hsu Lai-tai | 1 January 1989 | 7 October 1992 | | |
| Wang Gungwu | 1 January 1990 | 7 October 1992 | | |
| Selina Chow Liang Shuk-yee | 1 November 1991 | 7 October 1992 | | |
| Edward Ho Sing-tin | 1 November 1991 | 7 October 1992 | | |
| Hui Yin-fat | 1 November 1991 | 7 October 1992 | | |
| Andrew Wong Wang-fat | 1 November 1991 | 7 October 1992 | | |
| Denis Chang Khen-lee | 7 October 1992 | 30 June 1997 | Barrister | |
| Edward Chen | 7 October 1992 | 30 June 1997 | Professor | |
| Raymond Ch'ien Kuo-fung | 7 October 1992 | 30 June 1997 | Businessman | |
| Andrew Li Kwok-nang | 7 October 1992 | 30 June 1997 | Judge | |
| Felice Lieh Mak | 7 October 1992 | 30 June 1997 | Professor | |
| Tung Chee-hwa | 7 October 1992 | 3 June 1996 | Businessman | First Chief Executive of Hong Kong |
| John Malcolm Gray | 1993 | 18 October 1995 | Hongkong and Shanghai Banking Corporation | |
| Vincent Cheng Hoi-chuen | 17 October 1995 | 30 June 1997 | Hongkong and Shanghai Banking Corporation | |
| James David McGregor | 17 October 1995 | 30 June 1997 | | |

== See also ==
- List of Executive Council of Hong Kong unofficial members 1896–1941
- List of Legislative Council of Hong Kong unofficial members 1946–1985
