= 1940 Hong Kong municipal election =

1940 Urban election

← 1939	29 February 1940	1952 →
- Turnout: 682
Nominee	Alberto Maria Rodrigues	R. A. de Castro Basto
Party	Independent	KRA
Popular vote	407	266
Percentage	60.5%	39.5%
Member before election
R. A. de Castro Basto
Elected Member
Alberto Maria Rodrigues

The 1940 Hong Kong Urban Council election was held on 29 February 1940 for one of the two unofficial seats in the Urban Council of Hong Kong. It was the first contested election since the establishment of the Urban Council of Hong Kong and also the last one before the outbreak of the Pacific War. The next election to be held would be the 1952 election, twelve years later.

== Overview ==
Only ratepayers who were included in the Special and Common Jury Lists of the years or ratepayers who are exempted from serving on Juries on account of their professional avocations, unofficial members of the Executive or Legislative Council, or categories of profession were entitled to vote at the election.

Names of Candidate (Surname first)	Place of abode	Description	Names of Proposer	Names of Seconder
de Castro Basto, Roberto Alexandre	Beau Sejour, 123, Argyle Street, Kowloon	General Medical Practitioner, M.D., M.R.C.S., D.O.M.S.	Pollock, Sir Henry Edward, Kt. K.C., LL.D.	Manners, C.M., Major O.B.E.
Rodrigues, Alberto Maria	126, Waterloo Road, Kowloon	General Medical Practitioner, M.B., B.S.	d'Almada e Castro, Leo	Dowbiggin, H.B.L. Honorary Lieutenant Colonel H.K.V.D.C., O.B.E.

The two candidates were both from the Portuguese community in Hong Kong. Incumbent Dr. Roberto Alexandre de Castro Basto was proposed by the Hon. Sir Henry Pollock, K.C., LL.D., seconded by Major C. M. Manners, O.B.E. had held three terms of officer of three years each on the Urban Council which expired a few weeks ago. Dr. Alberto Maria Rodrigues, a University of Hong Kong graduate who later became the Senior Unofficial Member of the Executive Council, was proposed by Mr. Leo D'Almada e Castro, Snr., seconded by Lt.-Col. H. B. L. Dowbiggin, O.B.E.

The election took place in the office of the Registrar of the Supreme Court from 10 a.m. to 6 p.m. on 29 February. 682 eligible voters cast their votes but nine of them were declared invalid for various reasons. The Presiding Officer at the election was the Registrar Mr. L. R. Andrewes, assisted by Mr. W. R. N. Andrews, Miss Grace Ezra and three clerks.

Dr. Rodrigues defeated the incumbent Dr. R. A. de Castro Basto by 407 votes to 266 votes as the result.
