= November 1932 Hong Kong sanitary board election =

- 17 November 1932
Nominee	C. H. Basto
Party	Nonpartisan
Popular vote	Uncontested
Member before election
R. A. de Castro Basto
Elected Member
C. H. Basto

The November 1932 Hong Kong Sanitary Board election was held in November 1932 for one of the two unofficial seats in the Sanitary Board of Hong Kong.

Only ratepayers who were included in the Special and Common Jury Lists of the years or ratepayers who are exempted from serving on Juries on account of their professional avocations, unofficial members of the Executive or Legislative Council, or categories of profession were entitled to vote at the election.

Carlos Henrique Basto was elected without being uncontested, replacing the other Portuguese board member Roberto Alexandre de Castro Basto who could not fulfill his duty as board member as he had left the colony.
