= 1952 Hong Kong municipal election =

← 1940	30 May 1952	1953 →
- Registered: 9,700
- Turnout: 3,368 (34.72%)
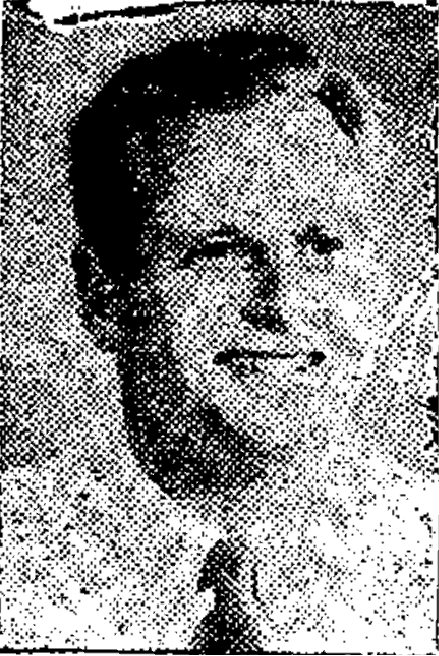

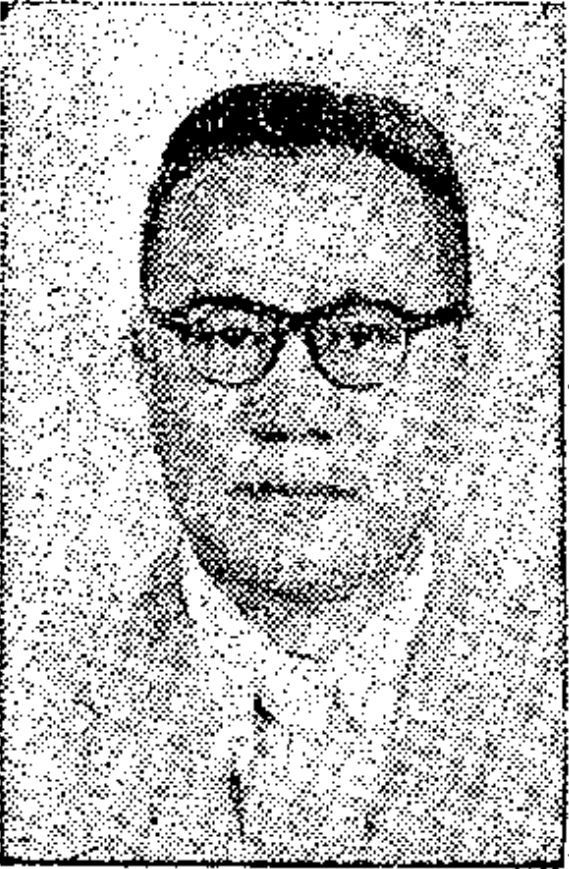
Nominee	Brook Bernacchi	William Louey
Party	Reform	KRA
Popular vote	1,168	1,068
Percentage	17.83%	16.31%
Elected Members
Brook Bernacchi
William Louey

The 1952 Hong Kong Urban Council election was held on 30 May 1952 for the two elected seats of the Urban Council of Hong Kong. It was the first Urban Council election since the end of the Japanese occupation of Hong Kong, the previous election having been held in 1940. Barrister Brook Bernacchi of the Reform Club of Hong Kong and William Louey, chief manager of Kowloon Motor Bus won the two seats.

== Overview ==
It was the first Urban Council election after the Second World War. Prior to the election, the former Governor Sir Mark Aitchison Young suggested a further constitutional reform by a new elected Municipal body replacing the Urban Council. The Young Plan was strongly opposed by the conservatives and the then Governor Sir Alexander Grantham. At the end, the Governor restored the election for two seats in the Urban Council which had existed before the war after the Young Plan was shelved.

The polling station was held at the Murray Parade Ground. Some 3,368 men cast ballots, about one-third of the 9,700 registered voters, lower than expectations. The China Mail said it could "scarcely be regarded as a convincing sign that the Colony is desperately anxious to enjoy extended franchise." Brook Bernacchi of the Reform Club of Hong Kong and William Louey of the Kowloon Residents' Association, chief manager of Kowloon Motor Bus, were elected out of nine candidates. Pro-Communist barrister Percy Chen, son of former Foreign Minister of the Republic of China Eugene Chen, was on the ballot. He urged voters to treat the election as a referendum to press London for a further constitutional reform promised by Young. He ranked sixth of the nine candidates, getting 461 votes. The other Reform Club candidate Woo Pak-chuen lost the race by only 38 votes.

== Results ==
Urban Council Election 1952
Party	Candidate	Votes	%	±%
Reform	Brook Bernacchi	1,168	17.84	New
KRA	William Sui-tak Louey	1,068	16.31	New
Reform	Woo Pak-chuen	1,031	15.75	
Independent	Tso Tsun-on	1,017	15.53	
Independent	Peter Henry Sin	866	13.23	
CRA	Percy Chen	461	7.04	
Independent	G. S. Kennedy-Skipton	386	5.89	
Independent	Kong Chi-nai	307	4.69	
Independent	Daniel Neng-fang Chen	244	3.73	
Turnout		3,368	34.72	
Registered electors		9,700		
