= 1930 Hong Kong sanitary board election =

- 8 December 1930
Nominee	R. A. de Castro Basto
Party	KRA
Popular vote	Uncontested
Member before election
José Pedro Braga
Elected Member
R. A. de Castro Basto

The 1930 Hong Kong Sanitary Board election was supposed to be held on 8 December 1930 for one of the two unofficial seats in the Sanitary Board of Hong Kong.

Only ratepayers who were included in the Special and Common Jury Lists of the years or ratepayers who are exempted from serving on Juries on account of their professional avocations, unofficial members of the Executive or Legislative Council, or categories of profession were entitled to vote at the election.

Dr. Roberto Alexandre de Castro Basto was elected without being contested, replacing the other Portuguese board member José Pedro Braga.
