= 1933 Hong Kong sanitary board election =

- 27 December 1933
| Nominee | R. A. de Castro Basto |
| Party | KRA |
| Popular vote | Uncontested |
Member before election
C. H. Basto
Elected Member
R. A. de Castro Basto

The 1933 Hong Kong Sanitary Board election was supposed to be held on 27 December 1933 for one of the two unofficial seats in the Sanitary Board of Hong Kong. Only one nomination was received therefore no actual election was held.

Only ratepayers who were included in the Special and Common Jury Lists of the years or ratepayers who are exempted from serving on Juries on account of their professional avocations, unofficial members of the Executive or Legislative Council, or categories of profession were entitled to vote at the election.

The election occurred as Carlos Henrique Basto who replaced Dr. Roberto Alexandre de Castro Basto who left the colony resigned. Dr. Basto resumed his post as an elected member.
