= 1937 Hong Kong municipal election =

Supposed to be the first election of the Urban Council of Hong Kong

- January 1937
| Nominee | R. A. de Castro Basto |
| Party | KRA |
| Popular vote | Uncontested |
Member before election
Li Shu Fan
Elected Member
R. A. de Castro Basto

The 1937 Hong Kong Urban Council election was supposed to be held in January 1937 for one of the two unofficial seats in the Urban Council of Hong Kong. It was supposed to be the first election of the Urban Council.

Dr. Roberto Alexandre de Castro Basto was again elected without being contested.
