= R. A. de Castro Basto =

Roberto Alexandre de Senna Fernandes de Castro Basto MRCS LRCP (5 February 1898 – 18 November 1980) was a Macanese medical doctor and member of the Hong Kong Sanitary Board and later Urban Council.

== Biography ==
Castro Basto was born in Macau to José Maria de Castro e Basto and Casimira de Sena Fernandes Basto. His elder brother was Carlos Henrique Basto (1890–1944). He was educated at the University of Hong Kong and got his Bachelor of Medicine and Bachelor of Surgery in May 1921. He was the second local Portuguese to graduate in medicine from the University of Hong Kong. He obtained his qualification to practise medicine in July 1921.

Castro Basto was on the editorial staff of the Hong Kong University Medical Journal, the journal of the University Medical Society, and changed its name into The Caduceus in 1928. He also had his study with C. Y. Wang on a precipitation test for syphilis published on medical journals including in the American Journal of Public Health.

Castro Basto was elected to the Sanitary Board which managed the colony's sanitary affairs, on 8 December 1930 without contest, replacing J. P. Braga. He was re-elected uncontested on 27 December 1933. He continued to serve on the board and it was transformed into the Urban Council in 1936 and was re-elected on 13 January 1937.

During his service on the Urban Council, he protested against the government's proposal of setting up refugee sites in Kowloon in 1938 on behalf of the Kowloon Residents' Association which he argued they were within or too close to the residential areas which the refugees would over-run the create nuisances to the negihourhood and menace to the health of the residents. He suggested to build the sites in the New Territories.

In the 1940 Urban Council election, he faced challenge from Alberto Maria Rodrigues, later member of the Executive and Legislative Councils. He was nominated by Sir Henry Pollock and Major C. M. Manners. He lost to Rodrigues on the election held on 29 February by 266 to 407 votes. His registered address at that time was Beau Sejour, 123 Argyle Street, Kowloon.

During the Pacific War, he moved to Australia and started his practice in Sydney since 1942. His registered address at that time was Commonwealth Bank head office in Sydney.

He later married Carol Small, with whom he had one child.

Political offices
Preceded by Jose Pedro Braga	Member of the Sanitary Board; 1930–1936	Replaced by the Urban Council
New title	Member of the Urban Council; 1936–1940	Succeeded by Alberto Maria Rodrigues
