= William Louey =

Hong Kong businessman

William Sui-tak Louey
- 雷瑞德
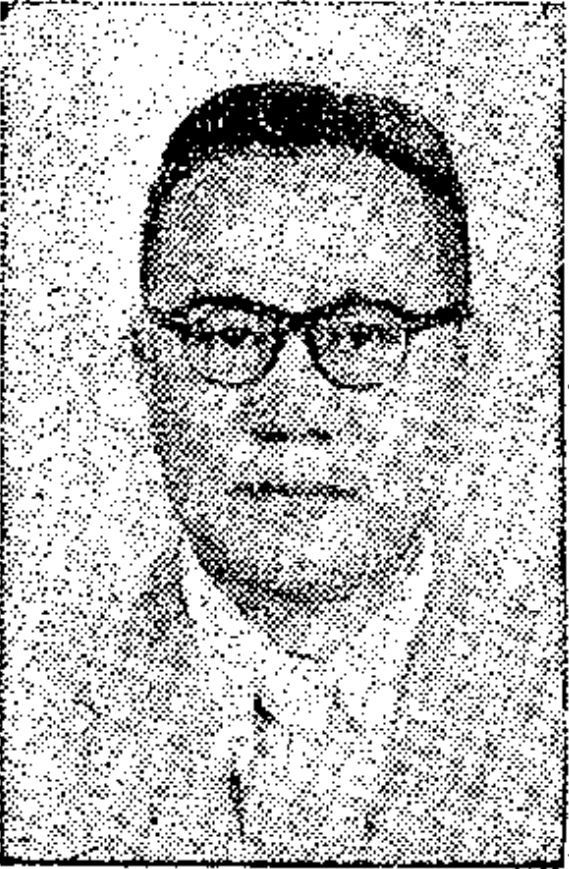
- Louey in c. 1950s

Member of Urban Council
- In office 31 May 1952 – 21 May 1953

Personal details
- Born: 7 July 1909; Melbourne, Australia
- Died: 9 December 1962 (aged 53); Kowloon, British Hong Kong
- Occupation: Businessman
- Known for: Founder of Kowloon Motor Bus

Chinese name
- Traditional Chinese: 雷瑞德
Transcriptions
Standard Mandarin
- Hanyu Pinyin: Léi Ruìdé
Yue: Cantonese
- Yale Romanization: Lèuih Seuih-dāk
- Jyutping: Leoi^{4} Seoi^{6}-dak^{1}

William Sui-tak Louey (Chinese: 雷瑞德; 7 July 1909 – 9 December 1962) was a Hong Kong businessman and the founder and Chief Manager of the Kowloon Motor Bus Company.

== Early life and career ==
Louey was born in Melbourne on 7 July 1909 to the son of a Chinese Australian. He returned to China when he was young and was educated at the Holy Trinity College in Guangzhou when his father and his uncle founded the Kowloon Motor Bus Company (KMB) in Hong Kong in 1922. After he graduated, Louey joined the KMB as an assistant manager and rose to Chief Manager in 1933.

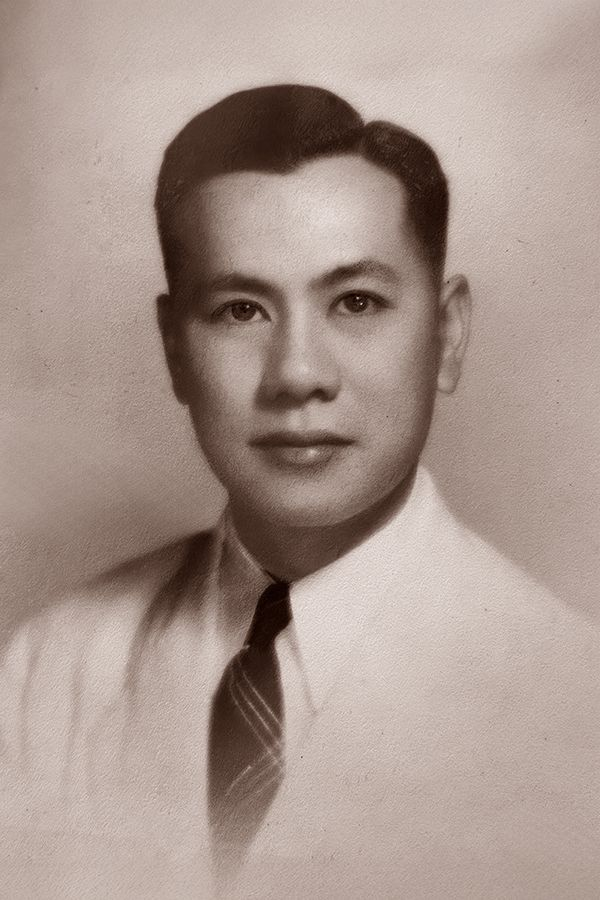
A young William Sui-tak Louey

At that time, there were several independent bus operators. William Louey bought a few of them and applied for the franchise of the bus service in 1933. He won the franchise to operate bus services in Kowloon and the New Territories, while China Motor Bus (CMB) secured the rights to provide services on Hong Kong Island. Together with Tang Shiu Kin, Lui Leung, Tam Woon-tong and Lam Ming-fan, William Louey renamed the company 'Kowloon Motor Bus Company (1933) Limited' (KMB). At the time, there were 106 small single-deck buses in the embryonic KMB bus fleet, offering two seat classes: first class (with cushion) and second class (wooden).

KMB services stopped operating during the Pacific War and Japanese occupation. After the war, Louey largely expanded his company from about 100 vehicles to more than 700. Before his death, he ordered more than 100 buses from the United Kingdom, bringing the fleet size to 895. Louey also experienced a few new company's change of policies. In early December 1962 when the workers took industrial action, Louey announced to raise the wage of the bus drivers.

== Public service ==
Louey was chair of the Rotary Club of Kowloon and Kowloon Residents' Association, deputy director of the Civil Aid Service, founder of the Kowloon Chamber of Commerce and member of the Advisory Committee on Public Transport and Committee on Technical Education. He was made a Justice of the Peace in 1957. Louey also ran in the 1952 Urban Council election and was elected to the Urban Council with Brook Bernacchi of the Reform Club of Hong Kong. He lost his seat a year later in 1953 re-election.

Between 1956 and 1957, Louey became the President of the Hong Kong Football Association with the support of South China Athletic Association. He defeated Chan Shu-woon, Urban Councillor and the coach of the China national football team who was supported by Eastern Athletic Association, by 43 votes to 9 on 6 October 1956. By that, He also became the President of the Asian Football Confederation.

== Personal life and death ==
In the morning of 22 December 1958, Louey was shot and injured in an armed robbery at his own residence, No. 81, Waterloo Road, Kowloon. Three men entered his house at about 10:30 a.m. wounded Louey on the right side of his abdomen during their struggle with Louey and his son, Ronald. Although the condition was not serious, Louey was admitted to the Kowloon Hospital.

Louey died suddenly from acute heart attack at 10:30 p.m. on 9 December 1962 in his residence at No. 81 Waterloo Road at the age of 53. He had two sons, Ronald Kwok-wah Louey and Kwok-kwan Louey, and two daughters, Kwok-chun and Kwok-wan. Kwok-wah and Kwok-kwan were both educated in Australia and Kwok-kwan worked at the Kowloon Motor Bus. The funeral service was held at the All Saints' Cathedral, Kowloon on 12 December and was attended by many government officials and KMB staff. His ashes were sent back to his birthplace in Australia. One-minute silence tribute to Louey was paid in all football matches of the Football Association on 15 and 16 December.

Political offices
New seat	Member of Urban Council; 1952–1953	Succeeded by Woo Pak-chuen
Sporting positions
Preceded by D. Benson	President of Hong Kong Football Association; 1956–1957	Succeeded by Chan Nam-cheong
Preceded by Chan Nam-cheong	President of Hong Kong Football Association; 1958–1961	Succeeded by A. M. Rodrigues
Preceded by Kwok Chan	President of Asian Football Confederation; 1956–1957	Succeeded by Chan Nam-cheong
