= Percy Chen =

Chinese Trinidadian lawyer and political activist

- Chen in 1936
- Born: 1901; Belmont, Port-of-Spain, Trinidad
- Died: 20 February 1989 (aged 88); Tai Po, Hong Kong
- Education: University College of London; Middle Temple
- Occupations: Barrister, journalist, businessman, political activist
- Other political affiliations: Chinese People's Political Consultative Conference (6th)
- Parent: Eugene Chen

Percy Chen (Chinese: 陳丕士; pinyin: Chén Pīshì; Jyutping: can4 pei1 si6; 1901 – 20 February 1989) was a Chinese Trinidadian lawyer of Hakka Han descent, as well as a journalist, businessman and pro-CCP political activist.

== Family and early life ==
Chen was born in Belmont, Port-of-Spain, Trinidad, British West Indies, in 1901. He was the eldest son of Eugene Chen, the leader of the left wing faction in the Kuomintang (Chinese Nationalist Party) and the Foreign Minister of the Republic of China, and Agatha Alphosin Ganteaume (1878–1926), known as Aisy, daughter of a French Creole father who owned one of the largest estates in Trinidad.

Chen was educated at University College School in London. He did his apprenticeship at the Middle Temple and called to the English Bar at the age of 21 in 1922 and practiced law for several years in Trinidad. In the fall of 1926 Chen joined his father at the Foreign Office of the Nationalist Government and felt he "had come home" although he didn't speak any Chinese. He followed the National Revolutionary Army to Hankou during the Northern Expedition. He was asked by his father to conduct Mikhail Borodin and other Russian advisors returning to the Soviet Union after the 12 April Purge of the Chinese Communist Party. He stayed in Moscow for six years under his Russian name Pertsei Ievgenovich Tschen before he became advisor to the General Motors Corporation in their negotiations with the Soviet Commissariat of Heavy Industry with his wide knowledge of the conditions in Russia, probably the first Chinese person to be employed by a giant foreign corporation as its advisor in a foreign country.

Chen was also a correspondent of the Ta Kung Pao, a pro-Communist newspaper, in Tianjin. He became increasingly disappointed with the Kuomintang and grew sympathetic to the Chinese Communist Party.

== Chinese Reform Association ==
Chen moved to Hong Kong and established a private law practice in 1947. He was a founding member of the Hong Kong Bar Association in 1948 and served as its first secretary.

During that time he lived in a mansion at Kowloon Tong. His daughter was sent to study in Switzerland. In 1949, he and some other pro-Communist intellectuals and professionals including Mok Ying-kwai and Wong San-yin founded the Hong Kong Chinese Reform Association (HKCRA) in response to the Young Plan proposed constitutional reform suggested by the then Governor Mark Aitchison Young.

The association demanded that all unofficial members of the proposed municipal council should be elected and the appointment system should be dropped. In a meeting on 13 July 1949 attended by about 400 delegates from 142 registered Chinese civic organisations, the association and the Chinese Manufacturers' Association of Hong Kong and also two Kowloon-based commercial bodies culminated signatures of 142 organisations which presented membership of 141,800 people from the business, industry, labour and education sectors in the Chinese community.

After the constitutional reform was turned down by Alexander Grantham and London in 1952, Percy Chen contested for the two resumed elected seats in the 1952 Urban Council election. He was the most energetic campaigner and was expected to win. Chen declared "there is no other Colony where the system of Government is so archaic; where the system of nomination instead of election plays a bigger part in the selection of so-called representatives." He concluded that the "Democratic system of Government has not been developed in Hong Kong." He urged voters to treat the 1952 Urban Council election as a referendum on reform and show London that 90 percent of those eligible cared enough to turn out on Election Day. Chen eventually lost to Brook Bernacchi and William Louey in the election. He contested again in the 1953 Urban Council election but was still unable to win a seat.

He and Mok Ying-kwai also tried to bring the comfort mission from Canton to Hong Kong in support of the Tung Tau Tsuen fire victims in 1951. The mission was rejected by the colonial government and Mok was subsequently deported in September 1952, Chen succeeded Mok as the chairman of the association and sought help from the Hong Kong Chinese Clerks Association in reorganising the association. The association remained one of the three pillars of the pro-Communist leftist organisations throughout most of the time in Hong Kong under colonial rule (the other two being the Hong Kong and Kowloon Federation of Trade Unions and the Chinese General Chamber of Commerce).

== Marco Polo Club ==
In 1956, Chen founded the Marco Polo Club, a dinner club with a select membership consisting of mainly foreign businessmen, journalists, trade representatives, and consular officers. It was the world's only social organisation in which Westerners could regularly and informally met the officials of the People's Republic of China, representatives from New China News Agency's Hong Kong branch, and the Bank of China over French meals and whiskeys and sodas. There were no membership fees but the guest had to pay for their meal at the dinner meeting. An invitation reminder came in the form of a simple postcard mailed once a month to members. The card requested their presence at cocktails, a European-style formal dinner, and a screening of Chinese films on the last Thursday of each month at the private dining room at the Mandarin Hotel. Percy Chen did not allow Americans to dinner gatherings until 1972 due to the poor relations between the Communist China and the United States.

Chen was also a member of the Sino-British Club of Hong Kong and led a group to visit Guangdong in 1957. He was a member of the Committee of Hong Kong and Kowloon Compatriots from All Circles for Struggle Against British Hong Kong Persecution during the 1967 leftist riots against British colonial rule.

== Later life ==
Chen published an autobiography China Called Me: My Life Inside the Chinese Revolution in 1979. In his later life, he was made the member of the 6th Chinese People's Political Consultative Conference (CPPCC) and was invited to witness the signing of the Sino-British Joint Declaration in December 1984. He died in 1989.
