= 1953 Hong Kong municipal election =

← 1952	20 May 1953	1954 →

4 (of the 15) elected seats to the Urban Council
- Registered: 10,798
- Turnout: 2,536 (23.49%)
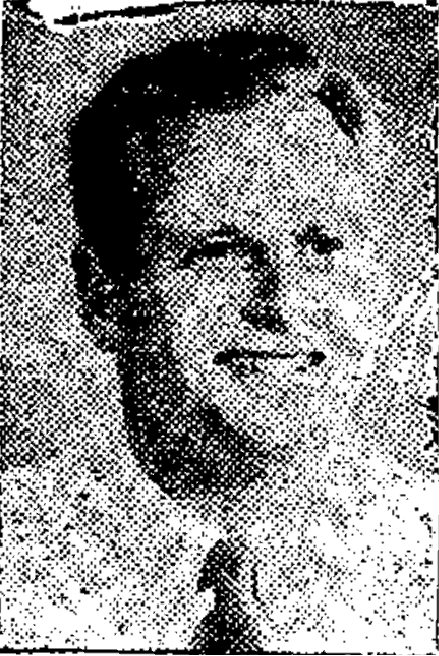
	First party	Second party	Third party
Leader	Brook Bernacchi	William Louey	Percy Chen
Party	Reform	KRA	CRA
Last election	1 seats, 33.58%	1 seats, 16.31%	0 seats, 7.04%
Seats before	1	1	0
Seats won	4	0	0
Seat change	▲3	▼1	Steady
Popular vote	6,374	1,726	456
Percentage	71.25%	19.30%	5.10%
Swing	▲37.67pp	▲2.99pp	▼1.94pp

The 1953 Hong Kong Urban Council election was held on 20 May 1953 for the four elected seats of the Urban Council of Hong Kong.

The elected seats extended from two seats to four seats in this election, which increased the total numbers of member from 13 to 15. For the first time the polling station was set in the Kowloon peninsula, at the Kowloon-Canton Railway Station in Tsim Sha Tsui, besides the one in Hong Kong Island. Despite that, only 2,536 of 10,798 eligible voters, about 20 percent of the electorate, cast ballots, less than last year.

All candidates from the Reform Club, including Brook Bernacchi and Woo Pak-chuen were elected, while incumbent William Louey lost the re-election.

== Results ==
Urban Council Election 1953
Party	Candidate	Votes	%	±%
Reform	Brook Bernacchi	2,100	23.47	+5.64
Reform	Woo Pak-chuen	1,746	19.52	+3.77
Reform	Raymond Harry Shoon Lee	1,304	14.58	New
Reform	Philip Au	1,224	13.68	New
KRA	P. J. Griffiths	981	10.97	
KRA	William Sui-tak Louey	745	8.33	−7.98
CRA	Percy Chen	456	5.10	−1.94
Independent	G. O. Jones	390	4.36	
Turnout		2,536	23.49	
Registered electors		10,798		
