= Unofficial members of the Hong Kong Executive Council =

In Hong Kong, the Unofficial Members of the Executive Council (also Non-Official Members of the Executive Council) (Chinese: 行政局非官守議員/行政會議非官守議員) are a group of officials that do not hold office in the government but are appointed to advise and assist the Chief Executive, or during colonial period the Governor, in the Executive Council. These officials used to be provided with research and administrative assistance by the Office of the Unofficial Members of the Executive and Legislative Councils.

== See also ==
- Executive Council of Hong Kong
- List of Executive Council of Hong Kong unofficial members 1896–1941
- List of Executive Council of Hong Kong unofficial members 1946–1997
