= Young Plan (Hong Kong) =

1946 Hong Kong constitutional reform proposal

- Traditional Chinese: 楊慕琦計劃
Transcriptions
Yue: Cantonese
- Yale Romanization: Yèuhng mouh kèih gai waahk
- Jyutping: Joeng^{4} mou^{6} kei^{4} gai^{3} waak^{6}

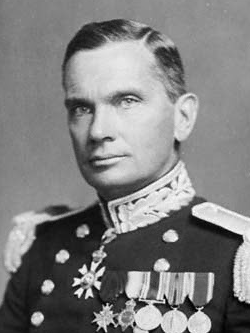
Mark Young, Governor of Hong Kong who proposed the introduction of representative democracy

The Young Plan was a constitutional reform proposal carried out in 1946 attempting to introduce representative democracy in colonial Hong Kong. Named after the then Governor, Mark Young, it was the first major reform proposal to give Hong Kong inhabitants a greater share of managing their own affairs by widening the base of Hong Kong's political system through the creation of a new Municipal Council. The proposed Council was to consist of an elected majority based on a fairly wide franchise, with powers and autonomy over all urban services, education, social welfare, town planning and other functions. It even allowed for indirect election of two Unofficial Members of the Legislative Council (LegCo) by the new Council.

Unofficial Members of the Legislative Council were opposed to the transfer of power to the new body and Young's successor, Governor Alexander Grantham who was opposed to the Young Plan, did not press this issue. Discussion dragged on but the continued opposition of Unofficials in LegCo in addition to the fear of the potential of penetration by Communist China finally killed the plan in 1952. This was the last move towards any form of major electorally-based government until in the 1980s during the Sino-British negotiations on Hong Kong's sovereignty.

== Background ==
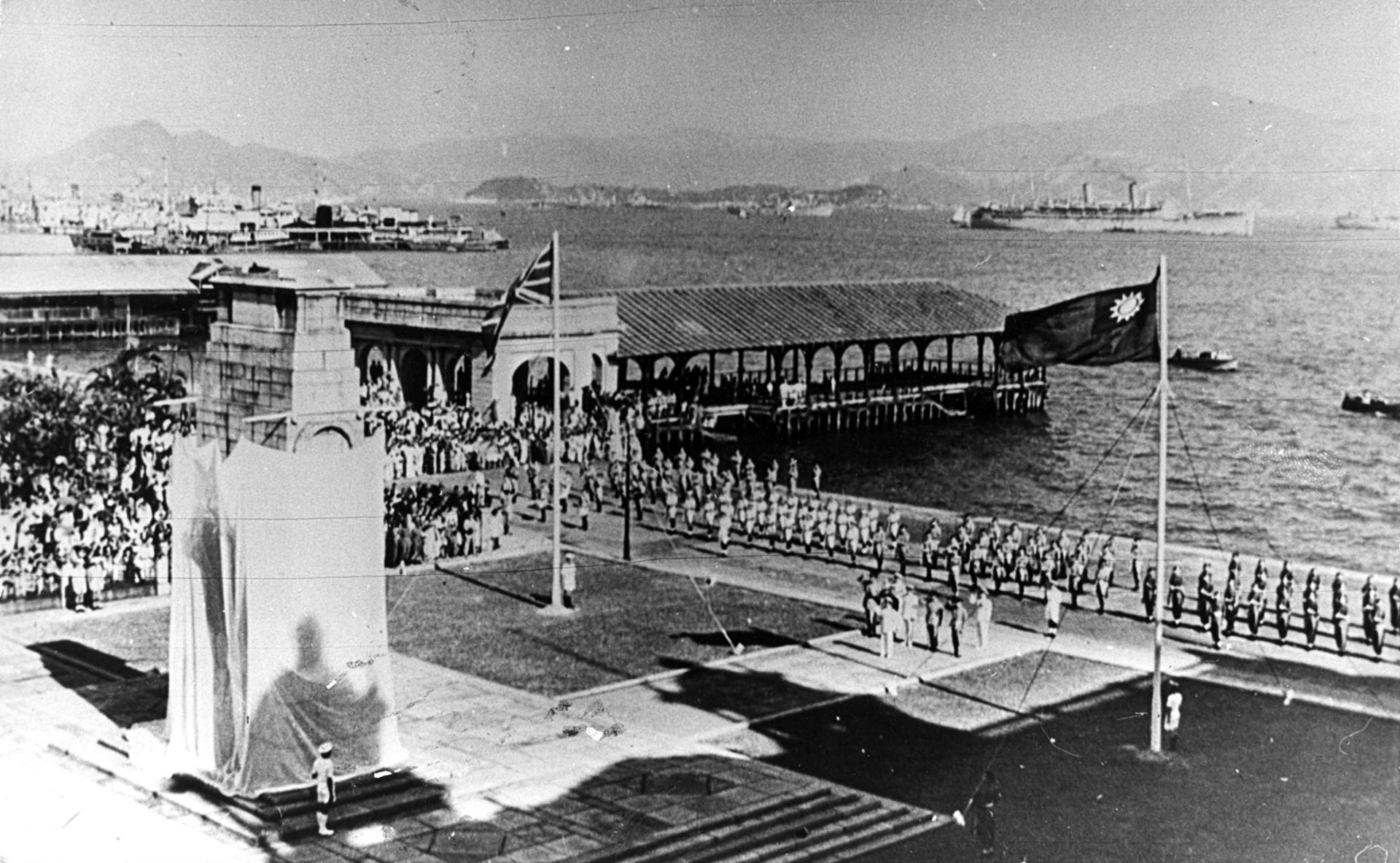
Liberation of Hong Kong in 1945 at the Cenotaph in Central, Hong Kong

The demand and attempts for constitutional reform in Hong Kong had occurred from time to time, but it had been an intractable problem for the colonial government due to the overwhelmingly majority of the Chinese population.

Until during the Second World War when Hong Kong was under Japanese occupation, the collapse of the British imperial power in East Asia in the face of Japanese onslaught and also the emergence of a demand from the Chinese Nationalist government under Chiang Kai-shek for the retrocession of Hong Kong during the war, forced the British government to seriously examine the possibility of constitutional reform in post-war Hong Kong. By the Young Plan, the colonial government meant to create a sense of belonging and loyalty to Hong Kong among all its inhabitants regardless of race in the shadow of increasing Chinese influence over the local population, as well as China's demand for the return of Hong Kong.

The 1945 UK Election saw the Labour Party swept into power in London. The new Labour government had pledged to introduce self-government throughout the British Empire, including in Hong Kong.

== Proposal ==
Proposed composition of Municipal Council
	Seats	
	Chinese	European
Elected	10	10
General Chamber of Commerce	–	2
Chinese General Chamber of Commerce	1	–
Non-official Justices of the Peace	1	1
University of Hong Kong	1	–
Hong Kong Residents' Association	–	1
Kowloon Residents' Association	–	1
Unions	2	–
Appointed	5	5
Total	15	15

Sir Mark Young was the governor of Hong Kong when the colony fell under the control of Japan on Christmas Day after the Battle of Hong Kong. He spent the war in various prison camps and returned on 1 May 1946. Upon his return, Young announced the plan for constitutional changes on the first day of the return of the civil government:

His Majesty's Government has under consideration the means by which in Hong Kong, as elsewhere in the Colonial Empire, the inhabitants of the Territory can be given a fuller and more responsible share in the management of their own affairs. One possible method of achieving this end would be by handing over certain functions of internal administration, hitherto exercised by the Government, to a Municipal Council constituted on a fully representative basis. The establishment of such a Council, and the transference to it of important functions of government might, it is believed, be an appropriate and acceptable means of affording to all communities in Hong Kong an opportunity of more active participation, through their responsible representatives, in the administration of the Territory. But before a decision it taken on the methods of given effect to the intentions of His Majesty's Government, it is considered essential that the important issues involved should be thoroughly examined in Hong Kong itself, the fullest account being taken of the views and wishes of the inhabitants. The Governor has accordingly been instructed to examine the whole question, in consultation with the representatives of all sections of the community, and to submit a report at an early date, bearing in mind of the policy of His Majesty's Government that the constitution should be revised on a more liberal basis as soon as possible. The aim will be to settle and to announce not later the end of the year the principles on which that revision should be bases.

On 28 August 1946, Young gave a speech on radio outlines further details of the preliminary reform proposal. The main idea of the Young Plan was to set up a super municipal council which was given even greater power than its counterpart in England at that time. Young intended to make this proposed municipal council into an alternative to the colonial government, which would give Hong Kong a kind of representative government through the back door. Young also recommended several changes for the Legislative Council by giving some representative element to the Unofficials and increasing the portion of the Unofficial compared to Official Members. Nonetheless, Young also noticed the emergence of the influence of Kuomintang over the institutions and activities of the local population and saw the possibility of the Municipal Council to be used for their own ends. Therefore, Young suggested that the revision of the constitution "should be so framed to preclude the possibility of the Council concerning itself with political matters, particularly in relation to the future status of the Colony."

Mark Young carried out the reform proposal in the Legislative Council in 1947. The centerpiece of the plan was the creation of an elected Municipal Council. The new Municipal Council was to have an elected majority with the franchise open to all who were permanent residents and were literate in either Chinese or English with property requirements. The new body was to be divided on communal grounds: half Chinese and half non-Chinese. Of its 30 members, 20 (10 Chinese and 10 non-Chinese) would be directly elected, with the remainder nominated by various organisations, including the Hong Kong Chamber of Commerce and Chinese General Chamber of Commerce and the University of Hong Kong. The council was to be financially autonomous, funded out of the revenue from rates and licenses, employ its own staff and would eventually take over all urban services, education, social welfare, town planning and other functions. In July 1947, London publicly approved the Young Plan in principle.

== Opposition ==
Due to health problems, Young was replaced by Alexander Grantham in the summer of 1947. Grantham was not enthusiastic about democratic reforms in Hong Kong. As a long-time civil servant who started his career as a young cadet in Hong Kong, Grantham considered Young's plan ill-conceived. He did not believe the Young Plan would make the Chinese more loyal to Britain. Grantham's administration procrastinated the progress of reform by drafting the legislation for full two years.

The proposal also met with strident opposition both within the government and by some top elites. British businessmen began lobbying for a permanent European majority. Even before the publication of the draft bills, the Unofficial Members of the Legislative Council criticised the Young Plan on the occasion of the Budget Debate in March 1949. On 27 April 1949, Senior Unofficial Member D. F. Landale proposed a motion for the abandonment of the Young Plan.

With the support of Grantham, British-educated lawyer and unofficial legislator Man-kam Lo, one of the three members in the 15-man LegCo, was also strongly opposed to the Young Plan. In the final vote on "Landale Motion" on 22 June 1949, he argued that Hong Kong government was responsible for everyone and that Unofficial Members represented public interest without racial or sectoral bias. He questioned if the planned constituencies that would reflect local diversity. He also denied that councilors elected by such "fractional" constituencies could do a better job of representing the community then the appointed members. Without appearing to reverse course, Lo proposed more important changes for the Legislative Council as an alternative for the Young Plan in consultation with Alexander Grantham. Lo summed up the Unofficial's case, suggested reforming the Legislative Council instead by introducing direct elections by only British nationals for a handful of seats carefully balanced to remain safe in any contingency. All Unofficial Members voted for the "Landale Motion" for the abandonment of the Young Plan.

== Public opinion ==
In June 1949, the Reform Club of Hong Kong, which was recently founded by expatriates and local Chinese to press the government to implement the Young Plan, petitioned Governor Alexander Grantham for a directly elected LegCo. Charles Edgar Loseby, the first chairman of the Reform Club and a former member of Parliament, said the proposed council would be powerless to change governance in Hong Kong whereby the only interests of those "big business and financial houses and those dependent upon them" mattered.

In July after the Young Plan was shelved in the Legislative Council, another newly formed political group Hong Kong Chinese Reform Association led by leaders such as Wong San-yan, Ma Man-fai and Percy Chen joined the Chinese Manufacturers' Union, the Kowloon Chamber of Commerce, and 139 other Chinese organisations petitioned the governor for constitutional change.

Some interested Chinese also demanded more seats given their majority status in the population.

== Turndown ==
After Mao Zedong's victory in the Chinese Civil War, democratizing Hong Kong was not a priority issue in Britain. In fact, the Foreign Office was not worried that the Central People's Government would object to democratic changes in Hong Kong. On the contrary, its concern was that Grantham's alternative would give the Communist "ample grounds for charging that the reforms [were] undemocratic." Lo's revised proposals of 1949 were initially approved by the British government at the end of 1950 but were postponed in early 1951 at the request of the Foreign Office since it did not provide for a wide Chinese franchise. The Foreign Office feared they might provoke a Communist's propaganda campaign and an excuse to raise the question of the retrocession of Hong Kong in the midst of the Korean War.

In 1952 as Hong Kong's first recession in the post-war era began to bite, the earlier local agitations died down. The British government's 1946 pledge to give Hong Kong people's greater local self-government was ignored. Grantham persuaded Britain to abandon all plans for political reform because it did not "interest the British electorate". Then before the Hong Kong public he blamed London for canceling the plans. In September 1952, the British Cabinet agreed to drop all major reforms for Hong Kong. In October, British Colonial Secretary Oliver Lyttelton announced Hong Kong at the time was "inopportune for...constitutional changes of a major character." Without appearing retrogressive, Lyttelton proposed that the reform was limited to the Urban Council, a statutory body with advisory and overseeing functions. Governor Grantham welcomed minor reform proposals. As a result, two elected seats in the Urban Council which existed before the war were reintroduced in 1952 and were subsequently doubled to four in the following year.

In the subsequent years, the issue of political reform was overshadowed by events such as the Cold War and the Korean War and the influx of refugees. By 1960, Britain had ruled out the prospect of any major change to Hong Kong political system. This was the last move towards any form of major electorally based government until in the 1980s during the Sino-British negotiations on Hong Kong's sovereignty.

== Bibliography ==
- Butenhoff, Linda (1999). Social Movements and Political Reform in Hong Kong. Greenwood Publishing Group. ISBN 0275962938.
- Chan, Ming K.; Lo, Sonny Shiu-Hing (2010). The A to Z of the Hong Kong SAR and the Macao SAR. Scarecrow Press. ISBN 978-1461672289.
- Jones, Catherine M. (1990). Promoting Prosperity: The Hong Kong Way of Social Policy. Hong Kong: Chinese University Press. ISBN 9622014755.
- Lau, Siu-kai; Liu, Zhaojia (1984). Society and Politics in Hong Kong. Hong Kong: Chinese University Press. ISBN 9622013368.
- Loh, Christine (2006). Functional Constituencies: A Unique Feature of the Hong Kong Legislative Council. Hong Kong University Press. ISBN 9622097901.
- Pepper, Suzanne (2007). Keeping Democracy at Bay: Hong Kong and the Challenge of Chinese Political Reform. Rowman & Littlefield Publishers. ISBN 978-1461638483.
- Tsang, Steve (2007). A Modern History of Hong Kong. I.B.Tauris. ISBN 978-1845114190.
- Tsang, Steve Yui-sang (1995). Government and Politics. Hong Kong University Press. ISBN 9622093922.
