= St Joseph's College, Hong Kong =

Catholic all-boys secondary school in Hong Kong

St. Joseph's College
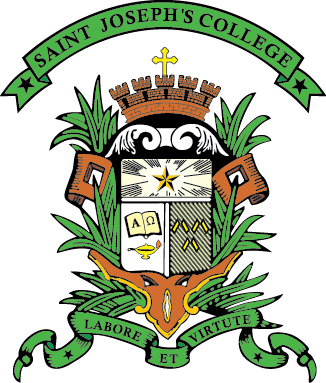

Location
- 7 & 26 Kennedy Road, Central; Hong Kong; 22°16′36″N 114°9′31″E

Information
- Type: Catholic, Grant-in-aid, All-boys, day classes, secondary school
- Motto: Latin: Labore et Virtute; English: Labour and Virtue
- Religious affiliation: Roman Catholic (Christian Brothers)
- Patron saint: Saint Joseph
- Established: 7 November 1875; 151 years ago
- Founder: Institute of the Brothers of the Christian Schools
- Principal: Mr. Kwok Tik Man (2024–)
- Supervisor: Perrick Ching
- Grades: Form 1 – Form 6
- Enrollment: c.1,000
- Colors: Green and White
- Yearbook: Green and White Magazine
- Demonym: Josephian
- Medium of Instruction: English
- Category: Band 1
- School Rally
- Website: www.sjc.edu.hk

St Joseph's College, Hong Kong
- Traditional Chinese: 聖若瑟書院
Transcriptions
Standard Mandarin
- Hanyu Pinyin: Shèng Ruòsè Shūyuàn
Yue: Cantonese
- Yale Romanization: Sing yeuhk sāt syū yún
- Jyutping: Sing3 joek6 sat1 syu1 jun2
- Sidney Lau: Sing^{3} Yeuk^{6} Sat^{1} Sue^{1} Yuen^{2}

St. Joseph's College, also referred to by its acronym SJC, is an English medium Catholic all-boys secondary education institution run by the Institute of the Brothers of the Christian Schools in the Central Mid-Levels district, Hong Kong. It was established by the French De La Salle Christian Brothers on 7 November 1875. It is the oldest Catholic boys' secondary school and historically has been one of the leading boys' schools in the colony of Hong Kong. It typically has about 1,000 students. Subjects are taught in English, except for Chinese-related subjects, French and Japanese language studies.

The sponsoring body of the college is the Institute of the Brothers of the Christian Schools, incorporated in Hong Kong under the St Joseph's College Incorporation Ordinance, Cap. 1048 of the Laws of Hong Kong. The stated mission of the college is "to educate students in areas of intellectual, physical, social, moral and emotional development" and "to impart a human and Christian education...and to do so with faith and zeal".

The north and west blocks of the college are declared monuments of Hong Kong. The extension of the campus at 26 Kennedy Road is also a Grade I historic building.

The school has educated Olympians, local public figures and a Nobel laureate (Professor Charles Kao, Father of fibre optics), and members of Hong Kong's most prominent families.

== History ==
=== Founding of the College (1875–1880) ===
The college was previously a Portuguese commercial school named St Saviour's College, located on Pottinger Street in 1860. Father Timoleon Raimondi, the bishop of the Colony, convinced Rome to send the Lasallian Brothers to the British Colony.

On 7 November 1875, six Lasallian Brothers arrived in Hong Kong: Brothers Hidulphe Marie (Director), Hidulphe de Jesus, and Hebertus from the Boarding school of Marseille, Brother Adrian Edmund and Aldolphus Marie from the Novitiate of London and Brother Isfrid from Paris. They renamed the school after Saint Joseph, the patron saint of workers and of the Universal Church.

At the time of the takeover, the school had just 75 students. Later that year, however, hundreds of Portuguese families had taken refuge in Hong Kong after a disastrous typhoon had swept over Macau causing the school's enrolment to double after just a few weeks. As a result, Brother Hidulphe had to suspend the intake of Chinese students. To accommodate the increased number of students, Buxley Lodge, a house at 99 Caine Road, was purchased in 1876.

=== Robinson Road (1881–1917) ===
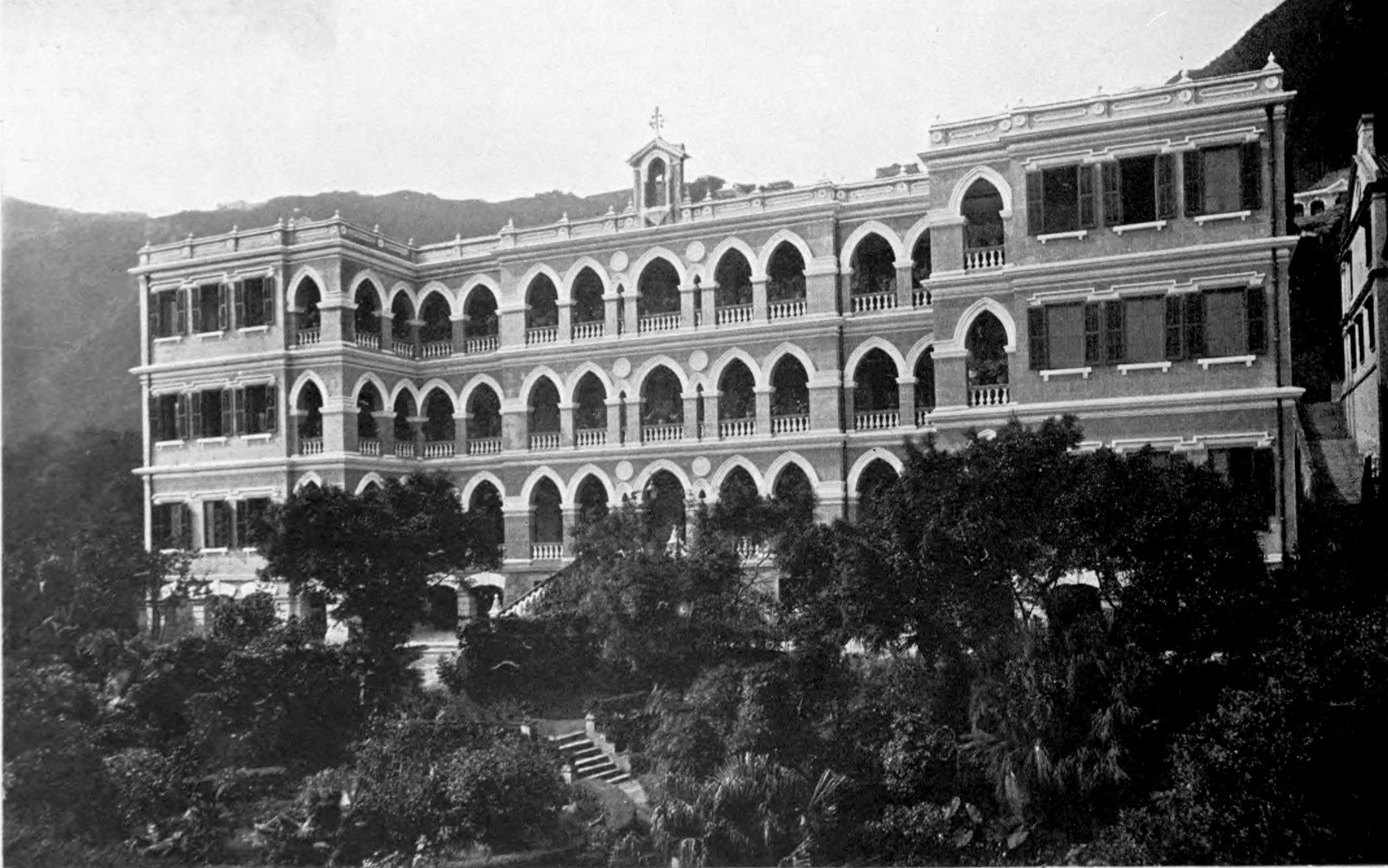
St Joseph's College at Robinson Road c. 1910

In April 1880, Brother Cyprian was appointed director. He had been a teacher in New York and Quebec, had held the directorship of several schools in his native land, Canada, and had taught in London and Paris. In order to cater to the needs of the fast-growing school, a piece of land in Glenealy below Robinson Road was bought, and a two-story Victorian building became home to the college in 1881.

In January 1884, Brother Ivarch Louis took over the directorship and was succeeded in 1889 by Brother Abban. Enrolment had then increased to 409, and two Chinese were employed as staff members by the college; in the same year, a third floor was added to the school building to accommodate boarders. The additional wings were added in 1901.

=== The Kennedy Road campus (1918–) ===
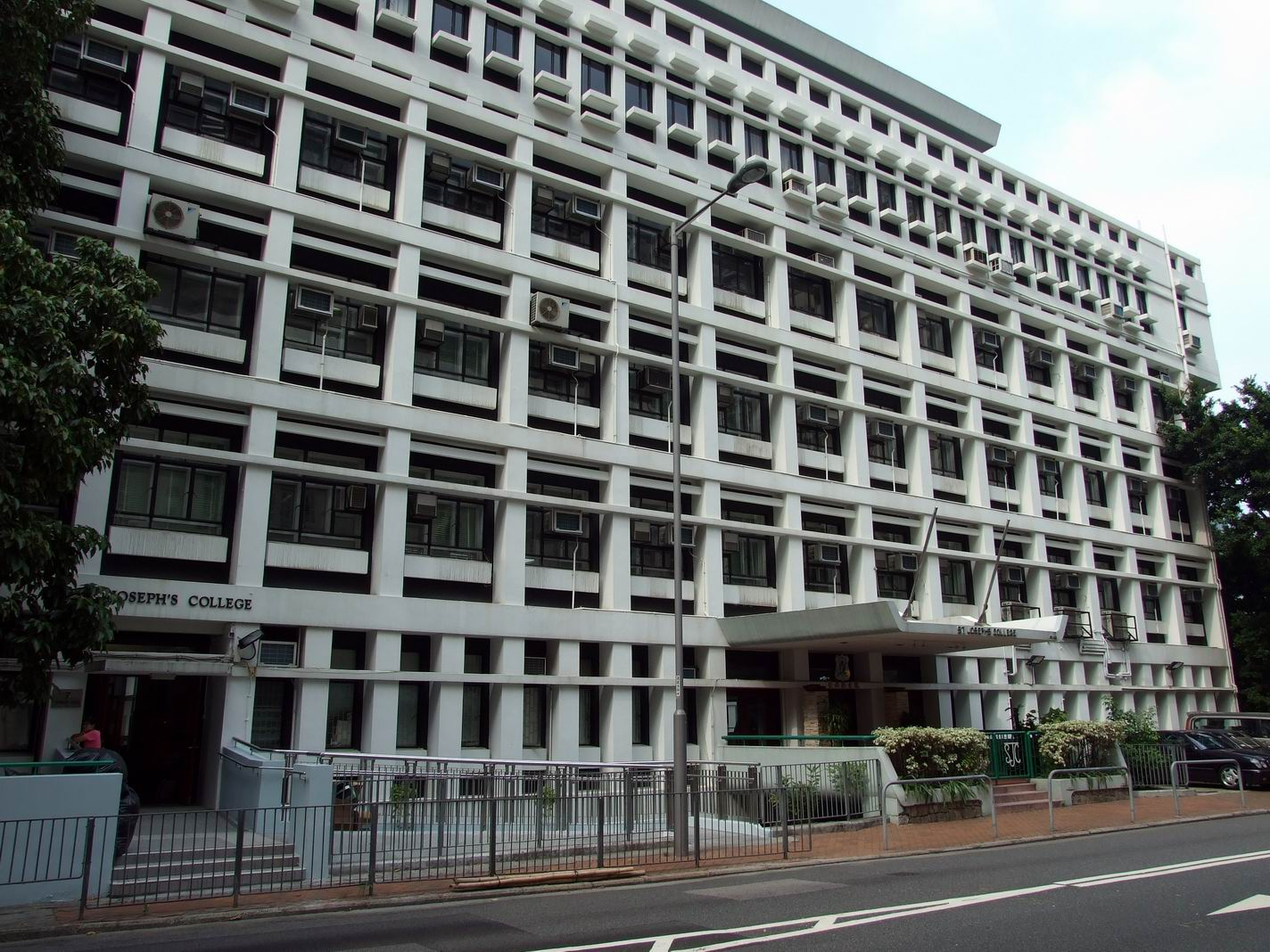
Front entrance

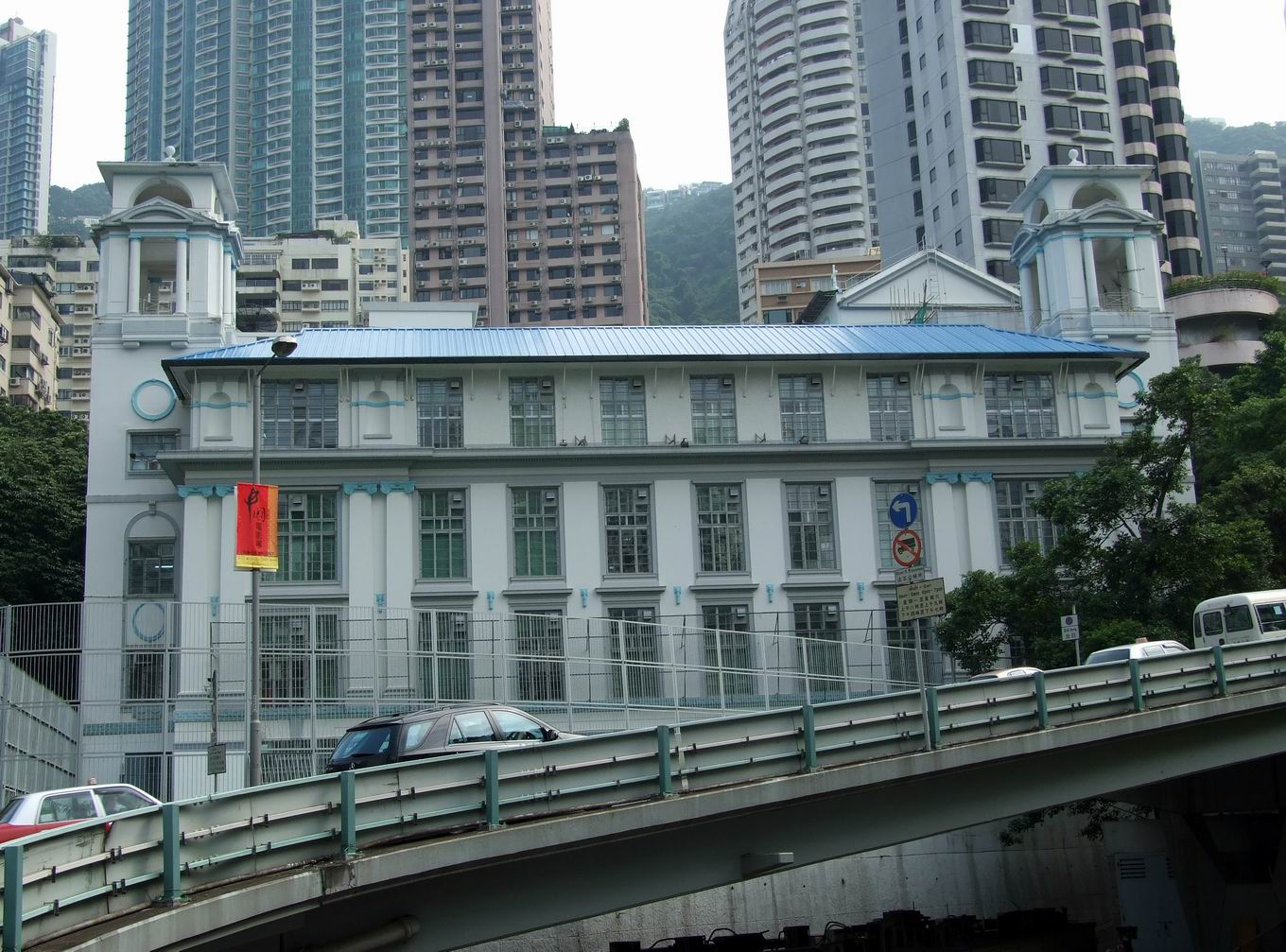
The North Block and West Block

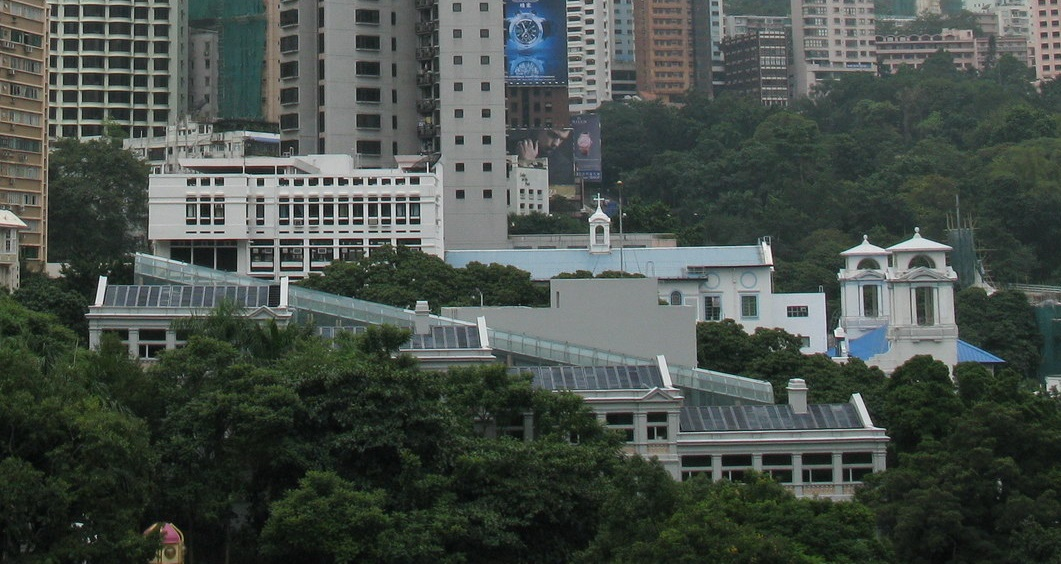
7 Kennedy Road Campus

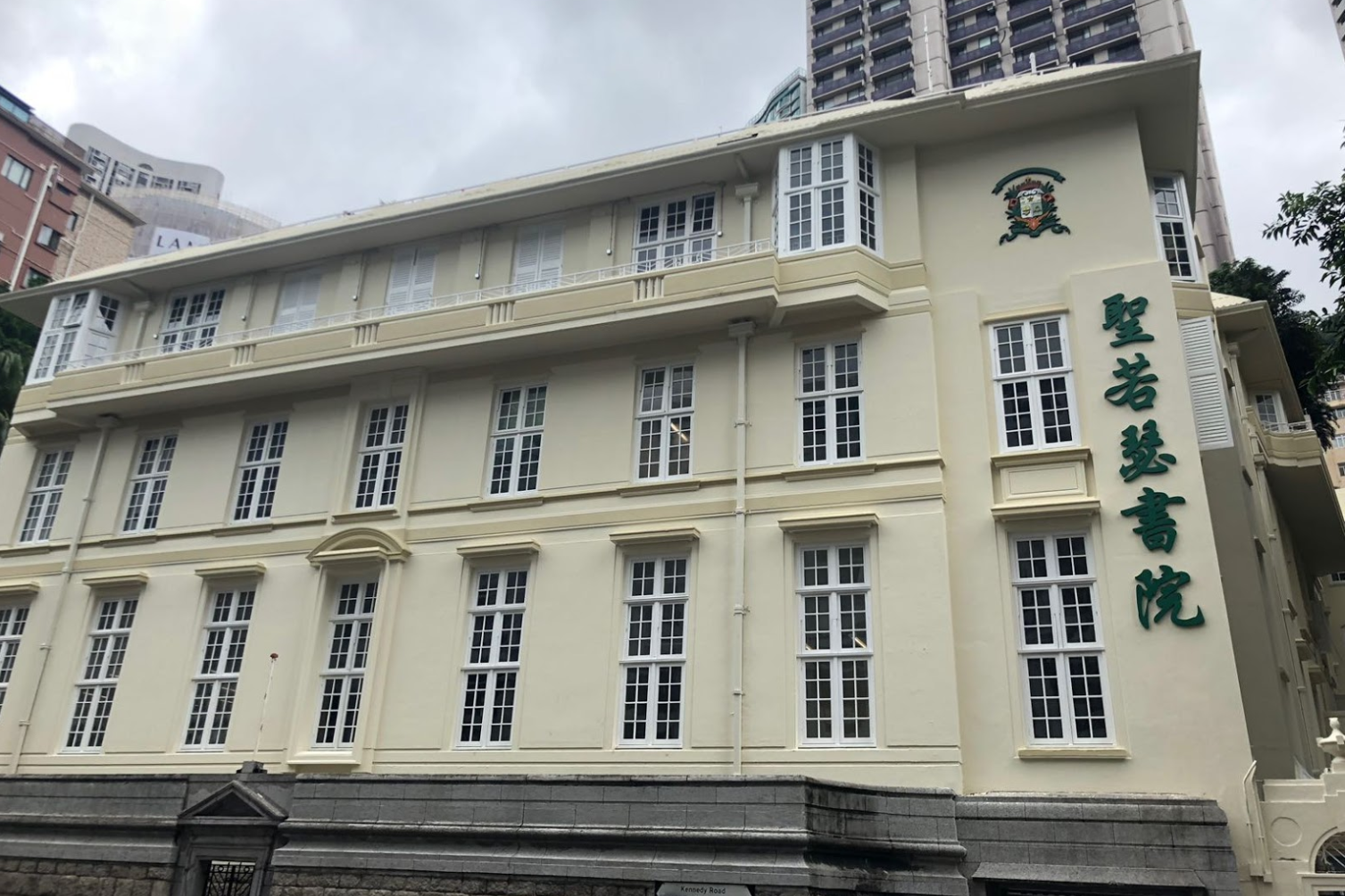
26 Kennedy Road Campus

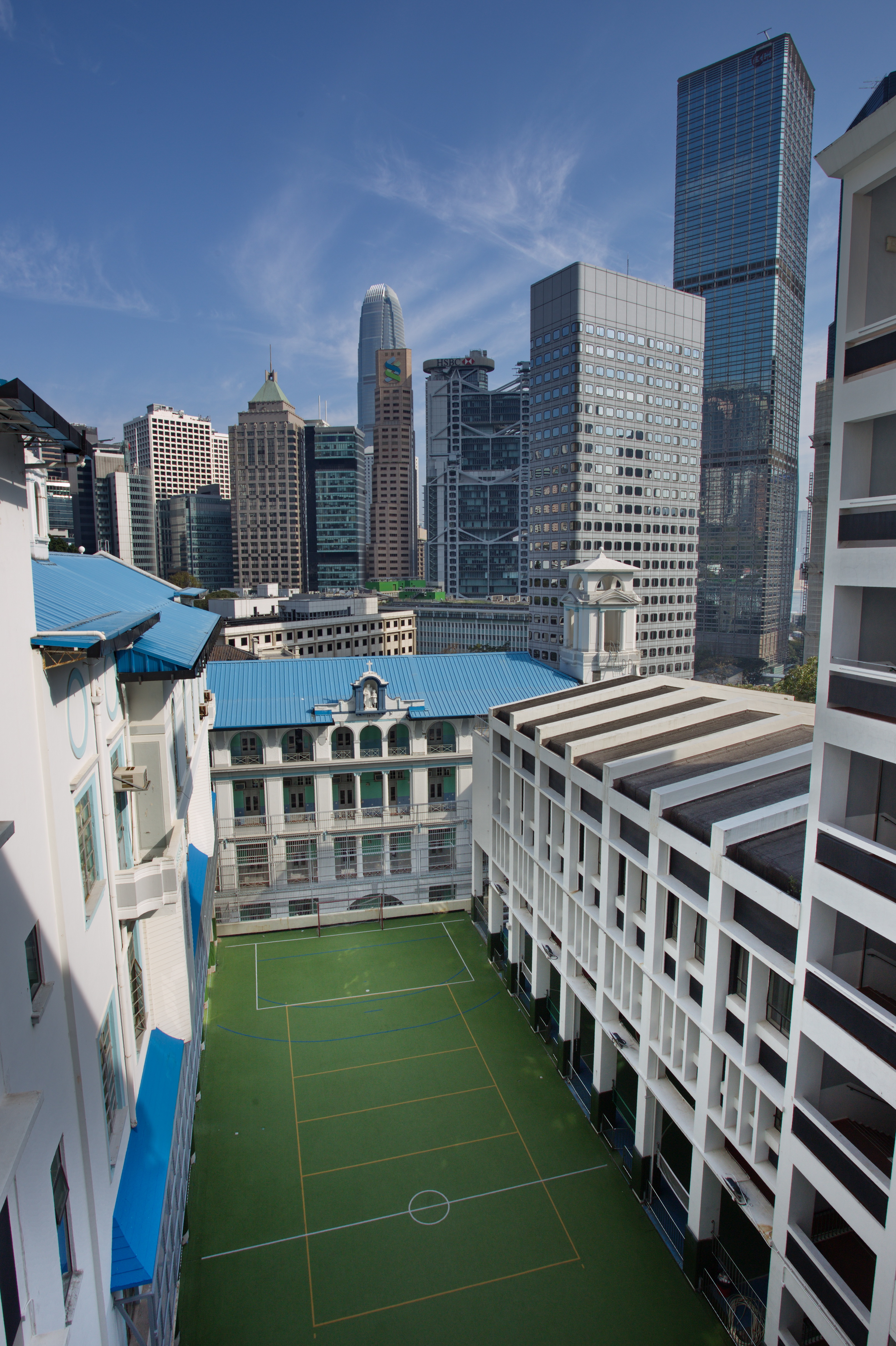
Atrium of 7 Kennedy Road Campus

On 13 February 1918, the Robinson Road campus was severely damaged by an earthquake. The Club Germania at 7 Kennedy Road was purchased on 3 September. Because pupils living on the Kowloon side had to cross both ways by ferry every day, a branch school was set up on Chatham Road, Kowloon, which became the La Salle College in 1932.

During the Japanese Occupation of Hong Kong from 1941 to 1945, the college was used as a clinical depot by the Imperial Japanese Army. Some Brothers fled to Vietnam and became guests of the Dominicans and the Jesuits, while others were kept as prisoners of war in the local concentration camps. The campus was kept in shape by a minor staffer called Ah Yiu, who also smuggled essentials into the camps for the Brothers.

The college resumed classes after the war. In 1962, Club Germania was demolished and the modern eight-storey New Building was erected under Principal Brother Brenden Dunne.

== Campus ==
The college is near the central business district of Hong Kong. Its architecture is a combination of typical colonial European (British Imperialist) and modern styles. The Charles Kao Block (Old Building, north block), constructed in 1920, houses most of the classrooms. The Chapel Block (west block) houses the Old Hall, music room, laboratories, lecture room and the school chapel. These buildings were built in a Colonial style reflecting European influences. The two blocks are declared monuments of Hong Kong since August 2000.

The modern New Building (south block), which replaced the original Club Germania on the site, houses the New Hall, senior laboratories, a library, computer rooms and a basketball court.

In 2016, the college successfully acquired the former St. Paul's Co-educational Primary School at 26 Kennedy Road, a Grade 1 Historical Building, from the Education Bureau. This block houses F4 and F6 classrooms, and the music hall.

A plan called "Vision 22" was in place to renovate the New Building (south block) in 2021. New student facilities including a student facility hub, a faculty hub, a heritage and appreciation hub, and a learning hub are to be renovated from the current library, staff rooms and previous senior classrooms. In the long term, the New Hall block will be rebuilt, featuring a multipurpose basketball court, a swimming pool and other sports facilities. The triangular playground will have a performance hub built-in, along with a new entrance at St Joseph's Path. A life experience hub will also be built under the atrium, providing short term accommodation for junior students. The project is expected to progress gradually, with the long-term plans expected to be complete in more than 20 years time.

== Staff ==
The college is governed by the School Management Committee. Members of the committee include the supervisor, the principal, three vice-principals, a teachers' representative, a Parent-Teacher Association representative, an Old Boys' Association representative and three Lasallian Brothers.

The faculty includes 67 classroom teachers, a careers mistress, a discipline mistress, a counselling mistress, a sports master, a librarian, one Native English Speaking (NET) teacher, and a French teacher. Laboratory technicians, IT technicians and a library assistant are also employed. A part-time social worker is accessible to the students. The current school supervisor is Brother Chan Jeffrey.

== Class structure and curriculum ==
There are 33 classes in the school.
Form 1: 5 classes (A, B, C, D, E)
Form 2: 5 classes (A, B, C, D, E)
Form 3: 5 classes (A, B, C, D, E)
Form 4: 5 classes (A, B, D, E, F) (NSS Curriculum)
Form 5: 5 classes (A, B, D, E, F) (NSS Curriculum)
Form 6: 5 classes (A, B, D, E, F) (NSS Curriculum)

In junior secondary, the school offers languages, arts, humanities, business, technology subjects, as well as religious education and physical education. (Note: F1-F3: Chinese Language, English Language, Mathematics, Integrated Humanities, Computer Literacy, Chinese History, Music, Physical Education, Putonghua, Religious Studies and Visual Arts F1-F2: Integrated Science F2-F3: Business Fundamentals F3: Physics, Chemistry, Biology)

In secondary four to six, students can choose three elective subjects from 12 offered, (Note: Business, Accounting & Financial Studies, Biology, Chemistry, Chinese History, Economics, Geography, Information & Communication Technology, Mathematics Extended Parts: M1 / M2, Physics, Tourism & Hospitality Studies and Visual Arts) besides the four core subjects. (Note: Chinese Language, English Language, Mathematics and Liberal Studies) In secondary four, students are required to have aesthetic education as well as religious education in secondary four to five.

As an English medium of instruction school, it adopts English as the teaching medium in most subjects except Chinese, Chinese history and putonghua. Events and activities such as the open day and the Green and White concert are also held in English.

Extra-curricular activities such as music ensembles and uniform groups are mostly held during lunchtime, after school or on Saturdays.

== Extra-curricular activities ==
=== Sports ===
In 1877, two years after its establishment, the college held the first local inter-school sports competition with St. Paul's College, and in 1880 it established one of the first modern football teams in the region.

The first local inter-school athletic meet with Queen's College and Diocesan Boys' School was held in 1899, and in 1903 the first local inter-school football league was formed with the two schools.

=== Scouting, Red Cross and St. John Ambulance ===
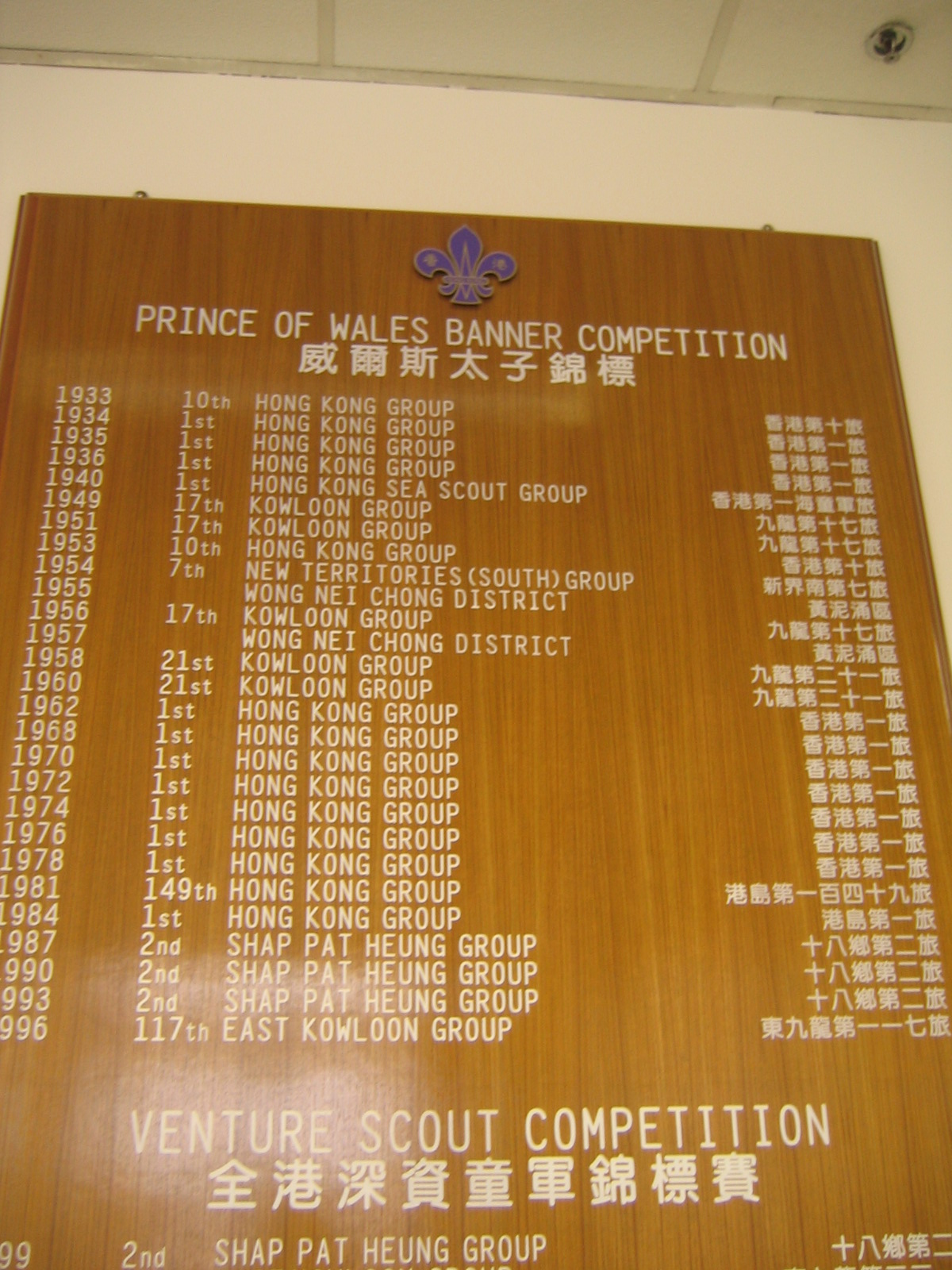
Winners plaque of the Prince of Wales Banner Competition

The college established a Scout troop in 1913, which was the first within the Catholic Church community in Hong Kong. As other Boy Scouts in Hong Kong were connected with the Protestant Boys' Brigade and British Boy Scouts, the St Joseph's College troop registered with The Boy Scouts Association of the United Kingdom as its first Hong Kong Boy Scout Troop, two years before The Boy Scouts Association established a branch in Hong Kong.

On 1 November 1967, an ambulance cadet division of the St. John Ambulance Brigade was established at the college and was the first ambulance cadet division after the first re-organization in the 1950s.

=== Music ===
Since 1974, the college has taken part in the champion title in Male Voice Quartet, Folk music, Solos and Duets, the Dorothy Smith Trophy (Boys Junior: Treble Choir), the Music Society Shield (Mixed Voice Choir), the Dr. Karl Hohner Shield (Melodica Band) and the Moutrie Challenge Trophy (Piano Solos: Final) in the Hong Kong Schools Music Festival.

The school has set up different music groups so as to enhance student's interest in music through various performances and joint-school events. The School Orchestra was established in 2000 and has performed in different public events and concerts. In March 2013, the School Orchestra performed with Tonbridge School Orchestra from the UK during its overseas Tour to Hong Kong.

The school has established various music groups such as the Chamber Boys' Choir, Chamber Orchestra, Junior Choir, Senior Choir, Melodica Band, Symphonic Band, String Orchestra and Chinese Drum Band. Each year, the school organises the "Green and White Concert" in early July. The 10th G&W Concert was organised at City Hall in 2012 with various special features.

=== Information technology ===
St Joseph's College developed an Apache web server in the 1990s, and launched Green & White Online, one of the first secondary school websites in Hong Kong.

== Motto, badge, and rally ==
The school motto Labore et Virtute (Latin); "勤勞與美德" (Chinese); Labour and Virtue (English) — is meant to summarise the life of Saint Joseph.

The badge of the college displays a shield divided into three divisions. The top division shows the Signum Fidei (a sign of faith) - a five-pointed, radiant star, which is taken from the insignia of the Institute of the Brothers of the Christian Schools. The right lower division shows three chevrons symbolizing broken bones.

The left lower division shows the book of knowledge on top (with the Alpha and Omega inscribed) and a lamp below. The shield stands with a compartment with supporters each of the French lily, as the Lasallian family originates in Rheims, France. The top features a ribbon with the name of the college, and a crest with a cross and a crown (used to symbolise Hong Kong as a British Crown Colony before 1997). Below the shield are three shells symbolising baptism. The motto of the college is displayed at the bottom of the badge.

The combination of green and white has become the college's official colours over the years. Green represents Ireland's shamrock, while white represents France's fleur-de-lis. The Lasallian Brothers of the college mostly come from Ireland and France. The school rally is based on a traditional Irish song O'Donnell Abú. Brother Marcian James Cullen (1868–1938), an Irish brother and director of St. Joseph's College in 1921, adapted the song and wrote the lyrics for the rally. James was posted to other Lasallian schools in Malaya and Singapore and brought the same song into use at a few of those schools.

== Notable alumni ==
St Joseph's College has produced eminent men in a number of fields.

=== Government ===
- Manuel Roxas, fifth President of the Philippines
- Eric Peter Ho, former Secretary for Trade and Industry
- Donald Liao, former Secretary for Housing
- Peter Tsao, former Secretary of Home Affairs
- Chau Tak-hay, Former Secretary for Trade and Industry
- Paul Tang Kwok Wai, former Secretary for the Civil Service

=== Academic and education ===
- Charles K. Kao, Nobel Laureate of Physics 2009
- Dennis Lo, Director of the Li Ka Shing Institute of Health Sciences, Chinese University of Hong Kong

=== Medical ===
- Jehangir Hormusjee Ruttonjee, founder of Ruttonjee Hospital and the Hong Kong Anti-Tuberculosis Association
- Dhun Jehangir Ruttonjee, former Chairman of Hong Kong Anti-Tuberculosis and Thoracic Diseases Association
- Alberto Rodrigues, founding President of The Federation of Medical Societies of Hong Kong
- Woo Pak-foo, former Medical Practitioner and Member of the Urban Council of Hong Kong
- Edward Leong, former Chairman of the Hospital Authority of Hong Kong

=== Legal ===
- Leo d'Almada e Castro, former President of the Hong Kong Bar Association
- Woo Po-shing, founder of Woo Kwan Lee & Lo
- Woo Pak-chuen, former President of the Law Society of Hong Kong
- John Joseph Swaine, former President of the Legislative Council of Hong Kong, former Chairman of the Hong Kong Jockey Club
- Peter Nguyen, Judge of the Court of First Instance of the High Court
- Peter Cheung, Justice of Appeal of the Court of Appeal of the High Court
- David Leung Cheuk-yin, former Director of Public Prosecutions

=== Business ===
- José Pedro Braga, former Chairman of China Light and Power Company
- Lee Quo-wei, former Chairman of Hang Seng Bank Ltd and The Stock Exchange of Hong Kong Limited
- Simon Lee, former Chairman of the Sun Hing Group of Companies
- David Li, Chairman & Chief Executive of The Bank of East Asia, Limited
- Ronald Arculli, former Chairman of The Hong Kong Jockey Club
- Abraham Shek, Member of the Legislative Council of Hong Kong (primary school)
- Vincent Lo, Founder and Chairman of Shui On Group
- Jeffrey Lam, Member of the Executive Council and Legislative Council of Hong Kong
- Dickson Poon, Chairman of Dickson Concepts (International) Limited
- Martin Lee Ka-shing, Vice Chairman and managing director of Henderson Land Development and Henderson Investment Limited

=== Other professional industries ===
- Li Fook-shu, co-founder of the Hong Kong Society of Accountants
- Li Fook-wo, former Chief Manager of Bank of East Asia
- Luke Him Sau, Founder of the Hong Kong Institute of Architects
- Edward Ho, Group Chairman of the Wong Tung Group of Companies
- Dennis Lau, Chairman of the Association of Architectural Practices

=== Sports ===
- Peter Wong, former coach of HK First Division football teams including Eastern A.A. Football Team, South China and Tsuen Wan
- Leslie Santos, former Hong Kong National Football Team member

=== Performing arts ===
- Joe Junior, actor
- Jan Lamb, DJ of Commercial Radio Hong Kong
- Alex Fong, singer, actor and TV game show host
- Wilfred Lau, actor and singer
- Andy Leung, singer
- Alfred Hui, dentist and Cantopop singer
- Terence Lam, singer

== See also ==
- Education in Hong Kong
- List of schools in Hong Kong
- List of buildings and structures in Hong Kong
- De La Salle Brothers
- Lasallian educational institutions
