= 1939 Hong Kong municipal election =

- 8 February 1939
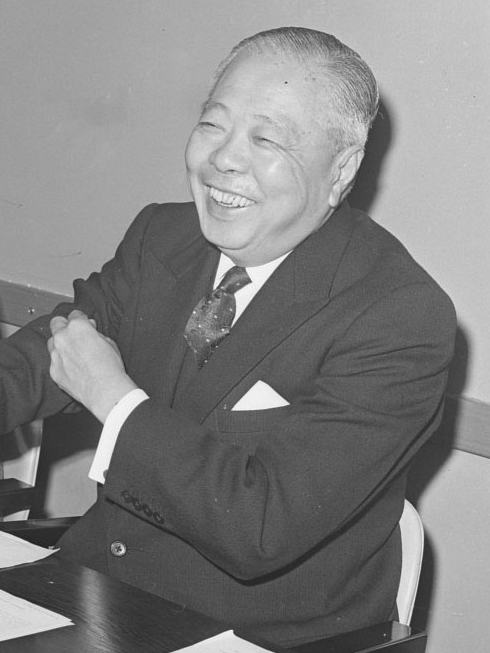
Nominee	Chau Sik-nin
Party	Nonpartisan
Popular vote	Uncontested
Member before election
Chau Sik-nin
Elected Member
Chau Sik-nin

The 1939 Hong Kong Urban Council election was supposed to be held on 2 February 1939 for one of the two unofficial seats in the Urban Council of Hong Kong.

Dr. Chau Sik-nin held his seat without being contested.
