= Kwok Chan =

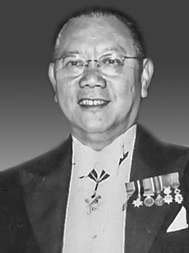
Kwok Chan

Kwok Chan CBE JP KStJ (traditional Chinese: 郭贊; simplified Chinese: 郭赞, 1904 – 17 June 1967) was a Hong Kong businessman and member of the Executive Council of Hong Kong.

== Early life ==
Kwok was the second son of the Hong Kong businessman and philanthropist Kwok Siu-lau. He was born in Hong Kong and educated at the Diocesan Boys' School. He studied business at the University of Hong Kong and joined Banque de l'Indochine 法國東方匯理銀行 (currently Crédit Agricole Corporate and Investment Bank) as comprador after his graduation, taking over the role from his father.

== Home ==
Kwok Chan inherited 101 Robinson Road in Hong Kong's Mid-Levels in 1936 and raised his family there. The property was part of the Kwok family compound (Inland Lot No. 719) that consisted of 97, 99 & 101 Robinson Road.

== Pre-war career ==
In 1925 during the large-scale Canton–Hong Kong strike, he joined the Special Police Reserve to help maintain order. He joined the established Police Reserve afterward. In 1930 and 1933, he became the director of the Tung Wah Hospital and the Po Leung Kuk, then the two largest charities for the Chinese community in Hong Kong. He held many positions in various sectors, such as vice-chairman of the Chin Woo Athletic Association, chief secretary of the football club Chinese Athletic Association, chairman of the Chinese Swimming Association, member of the financial committee of the St. John Ambulance Brigade, treasurer of the Hong Kong Society for the Protection of Children, founder of the Boys' and Girls' Clubs Association of Hong Kong, member of the council of the Kowloon Tong School and vice-chairman of the Chinese General Chamber of Commerce. He was made Justice of the Peace in 1941. During the Japanese occupation of Hong Kong, he was appointed member of the Chinese Cooperative Council, a puppet advisory council set up by the Japanese.

== Post-war career ==
After the Pacific War, he became the chairman of the South China Athletic Association, president of the Hong Kong Football Association and the Asian Football Confederation. He was also member of the council of the University of Hong Kong, Diocesan Boys' School, and St Stephen's College. He became the head of the St John Ambulance Brigade and Rotary and vice-chairman of the Red Cross Hong Kong. For the Chinese community, he was vice-chairman of the Chinese Temples Committee.

He was appointed by the government member of the Licensing Board, Business Advisory Board, Fishing Advisory Board. From 1950 to 1957, he was the unofficial member of the Urban Council of Hong Kong. He had also acted as unofficial member of the Executive Council. He was also representative for Hong Kong in the United Nations Economic Commission for Asia and the Far East in 1949, 1953, 1954 and 1958. He was rewarded Officer of the Order of the British Empire in 1953 and Légion d'honneur in 1955. He was promoted to Commander of the Order of St John in 1957 and Knight of the Order of St John in 1961. In 1962, he was made Commander of the Order of the British Empire.

In 1960, he became vice-chairman of the board of the Hang Seng Bank. He was also director of many companies such as Hongkong Electric Company, Hong Kong and Yaumati Ferry Company, AS Watson, Kowloon Motor Bus, Rediffusion Television, Dah Chong Hong Limited, Hong Kong Settlers Housing Corporation, Oriental Express Limited and Borneo, Greenland & Company.

Kwok died at Queen Mary Hospital on 17 June 1967 at the age of 67.

Sporting positions
Preceded by Man-kam Lo	President of Asian Football Confederation; 1954–1956	Succeeded by William Louey
