= Kan Yuet-keung =

Hong Kong banker, politician and lawyer

Sir Yuet-keung Kan GBE JP
- 簡悅強

Life member of the Court of University of Hong Kong
- In office 1 February 1972 – 2012

Life member of the Council of Chinese University of Hong Kong
- In office 1983–2012 Serving with Sir Run Run Shaw, Sir Quo-wei Lee and Dr. Hon-chiu Lee

Chairman of the Council of Chinese University of Hong Kong
- In office 1971–1982
- Preceded by: Sir Cho-yiu Kwan
- Succeeded by: Sir Quo-wei Lee

Personal details
- Born: 26 July 1913 Hong Kong
- Died: 19 September 2012 (aged 99) Hong Kong
- Spouse(s): Ida, Lady Kan (m. 1940; died 1999)
- Education: Diocesan Boys' School
- Alma mater: University of Hong Kong (BA, 1934); London School of Economics (LLB, 1937)
- Occupation: politician, banker, solicitor

Kan Yuet-keung
- Traditional Chinese: 簡悅強
- Simplified Chinese: 简悦强
Transcriptions
Standard Mandarin
- Hanyu Pinyin: Jiǎn Yuèqiáng
Yue: Cantonese
- Yale Romanization: Gáan Yuht kèuhng
- Jyutping: Gaan^{2} Jyut^{6} koeng^{4}

Sir Yuet-keung Kan GBE JP (Chinese: 簡悅強, 26 July 1913 – 19 September 2012) was a Hong Kong banker, politician and lawyer who was successively appointed Senior Unofficial Member of the Legislative Council and Executive Council in the 1960s and 1970s. He also served as chairman of the Bank of East Asia for 20 years.

== Biography ==
=== Early years ===
Kan was born on 26 July 1913 in Hong Kong to a wealthy family which is descended from Shunde, Canton. He has thirteen siblings and he ranked fourth amongst them. His father, Tong-po Kan, JP (簡東浦), was a founder of the Bank of East Asia. His youngest brother, Yuet Wai Kan (簡悅威), is a physician who was awarded the Shaw Prize in Life Science and Medicine in 2004.

Kan studied in Diocesan Boys' School in his early years. Upon graduation, he wished to be a doctor but gave up the idea when his family opposed it. He was enrolled to the University of Hong Kong and resided in Morrison Hall. He graduated from the university in 1934 and obtained a BA degree. As an alumnus of the Morrison Hall, he once recalled that "Morrisonians have always had such wonderful team spirit!" He then moved to the United Kingdom for further study and read law at the London School of Economics. He worked briefly at a law firm in England after graduation before returning to Hong Kong in 1938, which he became a practising solicitor.

=== Business career ===
Kan had a fast-growing career in law, business and banking in Hong Kong. He once worked as a senior partner of a well-known local law firm, Lo & Lo, and was successively served as the chairman of the Law Society of Hong Kong and a member of the Society's disciplinary committee. He was also director of Hong Kong Land and Harbour Centre Development Limited for some time. Besides, Kan had taken over his family banking business, and served as chairman of the Bank of East Asia from 1963 to 1983.

From 1970 to 1975, he was appointed as the chairman of the Hong Kong Trade Development Council for the first time. During his tenure, the Council expanded rapidly and had set up new offices in Frankfurt, Vienna, Tokyo, Amsterdam, etc. In 1973, the Council participated in the New York's International Toy Fair for the first time. Kan left the Council in 1975 but was re-appointed in 1979. In his second tenure, he kept on visiting different countries and promoting trading benefits of Hong Kong. On the other hand, the Council tied up closer relationship with Japan by setting up a new office in Osaka in 1979 and establishing an Economic Cooperation Committee with the Japanese government. In 1980, he also led a business tour to visit Canton. Kan finally retired from the Council in 1983.

=== Public service ===
As early as 1957, Kan was appointed as a councillor of the Urban Council and served as a member of the government's Public Service Commission from July 1959 to June 1961.

He was appointed an Officer of the Order of the British Empire (OBE) in the 1959 Queen's Birthday Honours. He left the Urban Council in 1961 and became an unofficial member of the Legislative Council. He was named chairman of the government's Transport Advisory Committee.

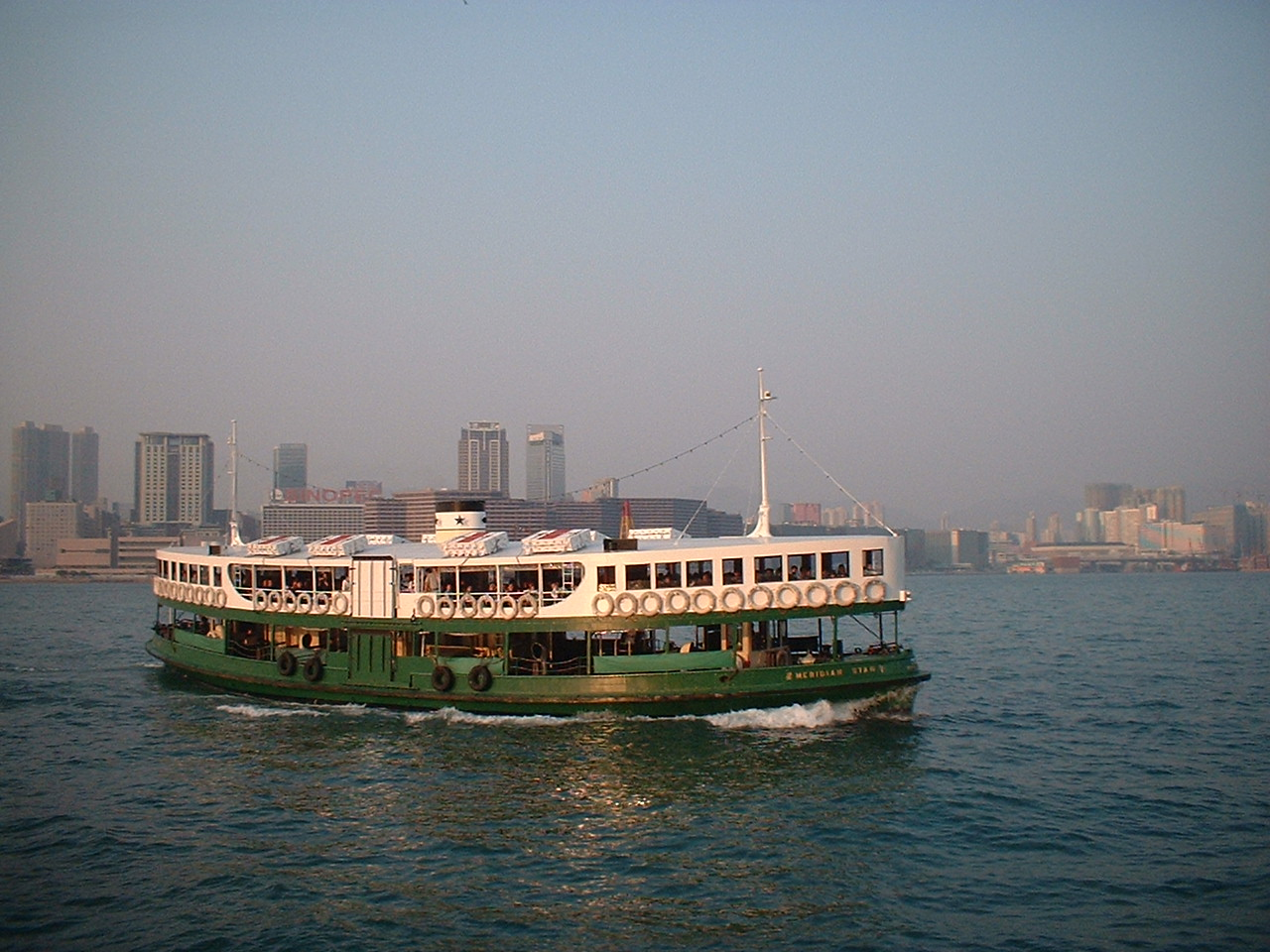
A cross-harbour Star Ferry

During his chairmanship of the Transport Advisory Committee in 1966, the Star Ferry applied for an increase of the first class fare of the cross-Victoria Harbour ferry from 20-cent to 25-cent and the application was soon approved by the Advisory Committee. The fare increase did not include the third class and therefore the grass roots community was largely unaffected, since the passengers of the first class deck were usually from the wealthier sector of the society. However, when the fare increase was announced by the government, it resulted in a general dissidence from the grass roots community as the Star Ferry was the only major cross-harbour public transportation at that time. The chairman of Star Ferry, M. A. R. Herries, worsened the situation when he publicly commented that "people who do not want to pay the first class fare can simply change their mind to the third class deck". That statement made a public outcry and was one of the blasting fuses of the Kowloon Riots afterwards.

Apart from his membership in the Legislative Council, he was additionally appointed as an unofficial member of the Executive Council by then governor Sir David Trench in 1966. As the Cultural Revolution had just commenced, the political situations of both Hong Kong and mainland China became increasingly unstable. In 1967, the turbulence from the mainland finally spilled over to Hong Kong, resulting in the disastrous Leftist Riots which began as a labour dispute in an artificial flower factory in San Po Kong. During the nearly year-long Leftist Riots, Kan held a hard line towards the rioters. He made a keynote speech in the Legislative Council, insisting those bombers be brought to justice and even death sentence for serious offences. He was appointed a Commander of the Order of the British Empire (CBE) in the 1967 Queen's Birthday Honours.

After the riot, Kan was further promoted to the status of the senior unofficial member of the Legislative Council in 1968. Afterwards, he began holding a variety of public posts including the chairmanships or the memberships of the School Medical Service Board, Public Service Commission, Social Welfare Advisory Committee, the Legislative Council's Finance Committee, etc.

Kan was knighted in the 1972 New Year Honours, and travelled to Buckingham Palace to receive the accolade in July. He retired from the Legislative Council that same year, but continued to serve on the Executive Council. In 1974, he was appointed senior unofficial member of the Executive Council. Soon afterwards, the price of rice in Hong Kong rose drastically and resulted in inflation. To solve the problem, the government appointed Sir Yuet Keung as the first chairman of the Consumer Council.

In 1978, a strike began by local civil servants. He was called to hold talks with the strikers and successfully reconciled the dispute. When Queen Elizabeth II visited Hong Kong for the first time in 1977, Kan, in his capacity as the senior unofficial member of the Executive Council, delivered the welcome speech to the Queen in the City Hall. In March 1979, he accompanied then-governor Sir Murray MacLehose to pay a secret visit to Beijing, where both of them had a meeting with Deng Xiaoping. Knowing that Communist China insisted on obtaining Hong Kong by 1997 and that the British Government had intended to give up over the issue of sovereignty, Sir Yuet Keung felt that the future of Hong Kong was less assured. After the visit, he was appointed Knight Grand Cross of the Order of the British Empire (GBE), and retired from the Executive Council in 1980, choosing to fade out from the politics of Hong Kong.

=== Later years ===
Kan was appointed life member of Court of the University of Hong Kong in 1972, he was also appointed life member of the Council of the Chinese University of Hong Kong in 1983. He was the chairman of the Council of the Chinese University from 1973 to 1982, and from 1983 to 1996, he was the Pro-Chancellor of the Chinese University.

In retirement, Kan lived in Hong Kong but had almost withdrawn from public life. He died on 19 September 2012, aged 99 with his funeral quietly held at Hong Kong Funeral Home on 18 September 2012. He is interred in the ossuary at Hong Kong Cemetery.

== Family ==
Kan married his wife Ida in 1940. They have two sons and a daughter.

== Honours ==
=== Orders ===
- JP (21 January 1949)
- Knight Bachelor (1972)
- GBE (1979) (CBE: 1967; OBE: 1959)
- Officier de l'Ordre national du Mérite (France, 1978)
- Officer's Cross, Order of Merit 1st class (Germany, 1983)
- Grand Decoration of Honour in Gold with Star for Services to the Republic of Austria (1983)
- Order of the Sacred Treasure, 2nd class (Japan, 1983; previously awarded 3rd Class)
- Knight Grand Cross, Royal Order of Northern Pole Star (Sweden, 1983)

=== Honorary degrees ===
- Honorary Doctorates of Law
  - Chinese University of Hong Kong (1968)
  - University of Hong Kong (1973)
- Honorary Fellowships
  - London School of Economics (1980)

=== Other public posts held ===
- Member of the Council of the Chinese University of Hong Kong (1963–1967)
- Chairman of the Chung Chi College Board of Trustees (1964–1968)
- Chairman of the Council of the Chinese University (1971–1982)
- Life member of Court of the University of Hong Kong (appointed 1 February 1972)
- Life member of the Council of the Chinese University of Hong Kong (appointed 1983)
- Pro-Chancellor of the Chinese University (1983–1996)

== Footnotes ==
Business positions
| Preceded by Kang Tung-po | Chairman of the Bank of East Asia; 1963–1983 | Succeeded by Li Fook-wo |
Political offices
| Preceded by Dhun Jehangir Ruttonjee | Senior Unofficial Member of the Legislative Council; 1968–1972 | Succeeded by Woo Pak-chuen |
| Preceded by Sir S. N. Chau | Chairman of Hong Kong Trade Development Council; 1970–1975 | Succeeded by T. K. Ann |
| New creation | Chairman of Hong Kong Consumer Council; 1974–1975 | Succeeded by Lo Kwee-seong |
| Preceded by Sir Albert Rodrigues | Senior Unofficial Member of the Executive Council; 1974–1980 | Succeeded by Sir Sidney Gordon |
| Preceded by T. K. Ann | Chairman of Hong Kong Trade Development Council; 1979–1983 | Succeeded by Lydia Dunn |
Academic offices
| Preceded by Kwan Cho-yiu | Chairman of the Council of the Chinese University of Hong Kong; 1971–1982 | Succeeded by Lee Quo-wei |
