= Kwan Cho-yiu =

Hong Kong politician

Sir Cho-yiu Kwan CBE JP
- 關祖堯
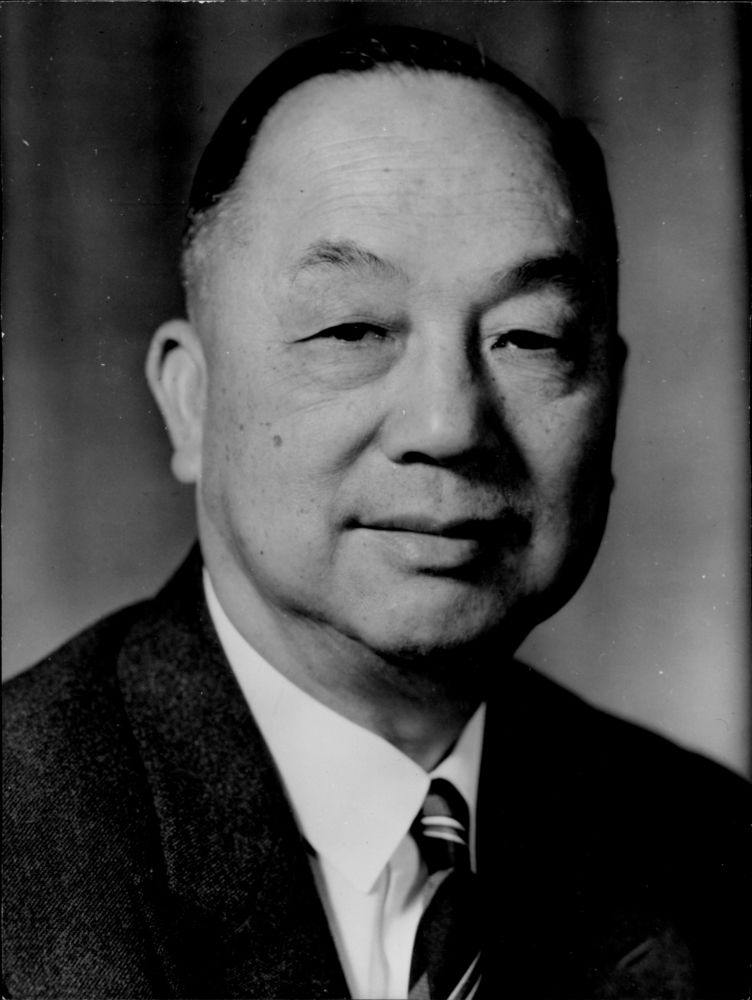

Unofficial Member of the Executive Council of Hong Kong
- In office 28 May 1961 – 7 December 1971
- Appointed by: Sir Robert Black; Sir David Trench
- Preceded by: Man-wai Lo
- Succeeded by: Woo Pak-chuen

Unofficial Member of the Legislative Council of Hong Kong
- In office 1 July 1959 – 8 June 1966
- Appointed by: Sir Robert Black; Sir David Trench
- Preceded by: Alberto Maria Rodrigues
- Succeeded by: Ellen Li

Personal details
- Born: 10 July 1907 Hong Kong
- Died: 7 December 1971 (aged 64) Pok Fu Lam, Hong Kong
- Resting place: Aberdeen Chinese Permanent Cemetery
- Spouse: Chow Wai-fung
- Children: Kwan King-chiu; Kwan King-hong; Kwan Lai-yin; Kwan Hing-yin
- Education: Diocesan Boys' School; University of London
- Occupation: Lawyer and politician

Kwan Cho-yiu
- Traditional Chinese: 關祖堯
- Simplified Chinese: 关祖尧
Transcriptions
Standard Mandarin
- Hanyu Pinyin: Guān Zǔyáo
- Wade–Giles: Kuan^{1} Tsu^{3}-yao^{2}
- IPA: [kwán tsù.jǎʊ]
Hakka
- Pha̍k-fa-sṳ: Koân Chú-ngièu
Yue: Cantonese
- Yale Romanization: Gwāan Jóuyìuh
- Jyutping: gwaan1 zou2 jiu4
- IPA: [kʷan˥ tsɔw˧˥.jiw˩]
Southern Min
- Hokkien POJ: Koaiⁿ Chó͘-ngièu

Sir Cho-yiu Kwan CBE JP (Chinese: 關祖堯; 10 July 1907 – 7 December 1971) was a prominent Hong Kong politician and public figure in the 1960s. He was the Senior Chinese Unofficial Member of the Legislative Council and Executive Council of Hong Kong and the founding chairman of the Council of the Chinese University of Hong Kong. For his contributions to Hong Kong, he was knighted by Queen Elizabeth II in 1969.

== Early life, education and legal career ==
Kwan was born on 10 July 1907 with the family root in Kaiping, Guangdong. He was educated at the Diocesan Boys' School and graduated in 1924. He later went abroad and studied law at the University of London in England. In May 1931, he was called to the bar in Lincoln's Inn and received his professional qualifications. He was a friend of General Ho Sai-lai, the son of Sir Robert Ho Tung during his time in England. He set up his own law firm, CY Kwan & Co, with the help of Sir Ho Tung in 1931 soon after he returned from England.

During the Japanese occupation of Hong Kong, Kwan was appointed the officer in administering the staple food control. After the war, he was the vice-president of the Standing Military Court from 1945 to 47 and chief magistrate of the Central Magistracy. He had also been president of the Law Society of Hong Kong from 1950 to 51.

== Political career ==
Kwan was increasingly involved in the public affairs. In 1948, he was appointed to the Committee on Chinese Law and Custom in Hong Kong. He was the director of the Hong Kong Council of Social Service in 1950. Other public positions included membership in the Public Service Commission, the Chinese Temples Committee, the General Chinese Charities Fund and many others.

He was one of the founders of the Hong Kong Housing Society, invited by Bishop Hall, and sat on the Executive Committee of the Society for many years which devoted in providing housing suitable for the low-income residents in Hong Kong in 1948.

He was also member of the School Committee of the Diocesan Boys' School and was briefly the chairman of the Committee after Bishop Hall retired and before the new bishop arrived. He was also chairman of the School Committee of the Heep Yunn School. In 1961, he became the chairman of the preparatory committee of the Chinese University of Hong Kong to oversee the establishment of the university and finalised the agreement with the government on the university location in Ma Liu Shui. He became the founding chairman of university council from its establishment in October 1963 until his death in October 1971. He had also been member of the council of the University of Hong Kong.

From 1956 to 1961, he was appointed unofficial member of the Urban Council of Hong Kong, until he retired and was succeeded by Wilson Tze-sum Wang on 7 April 1961. In July 1959, he was appointed unofficial member of the Legislative Council of Hong Kong. In May 1961, he was appointed unofficial member of the Executive Council of Hong Kong. In 1967, 1968 and 1969, he led the Hong Kong delegation to the UN Economic Commission for Asia and the Far East.

He was also on numerous government's advisory boards. For example, at the time illegal gambling activities especially off-course betting was flouring, Kwan was appointed chairman of the Advisory Committee on Gambling Policy in 1964 to examine whether new form of gambling should be legalised. The committee concluded the off-course betting should not be legalised for its moral arguments. He was also chairman of The Festival of Hong Kong Steering Committee to organise programmes for the Hong Kong Festival and member of the Advisory Committee on Corruption.

He was also director of the Hang Seng Bank and some other companies.

== Sudden death and family ==
On the morning of 7 December 1971, SIr Kwan had a heart attack while the Executive Council was in session and died despite attempts at resuscitation . In his eulogy for Kwan, Governor Crawford Murray MacLehose said: "He always proffered fearless, frank and wise counsel and he worked tirelessly until the last."

He married Chow Wai-fun and had two sons and two daughters. His eldest son, King-chiu worked in the pharmaceutical company Merck Group in the United States; youngest son, King-hong, earned a B.S. in chemistry at Marquette University and a PhD in pharmaceutical chemistry at the University of Michigan.

== Honours ==
Kwan was made Justice of the Peace in December 1946. For his numerous contributions to Hong Kong, he was awarded the Officer of the Order of the British Empire (OBE) in 1959 and the Commander of the Order of the British Empire (CBE) in 1965. He was knighted by Queen Elizabeth II at the Buckingham Palace in March 1969. For his effort in the establishment of the Chinese University of Hong Kong, he was awarded an honorary doctoral degree of law by the university in 1964.

Cho Yiu Chuen, a housing estate built by the Hong Kong Housing Society in Kwai Chung, is named after Sir Kwan.

== See also ==
- Kan Yuet-keung

Academic offices
New title	Chairman of the Council of the Chinese University of Hong Kong; 1963–1971	Succeeded by Kan Yuet-keung
Legislative Council of Hong Kong
Preceded by Alberto Maria Rodrigues	Unofficial Member; 1959–1966	Succeeded by Ellen Li
Preceded by Kenneth Fung	Senior Chinese Unofficial Member; 1965–1966	Succeeded by Kan Yuet-keung
Government offices
Preceded by Richard Charles Lee	Senior Chinese Unofficial Member in Executive Council; 1966–1971	Succeeded by Kenneth Fung
