= José Pedro Braga =

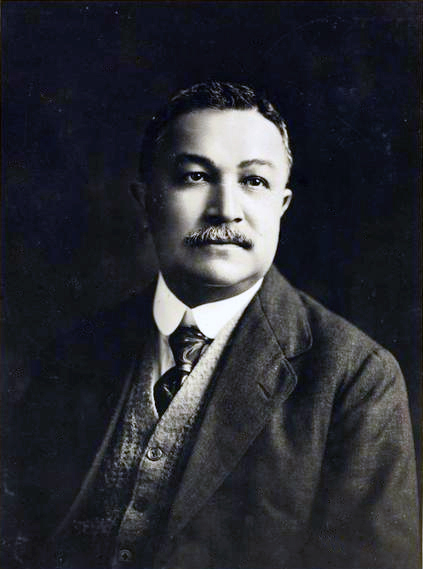
José Pedro Braga

José Pedro "Jack" Braga, OBE (Chinese: 布力架; 1871—1944 Macau) was a member of a Macanese family whose forebears came from Portugal to the colony of Macau in 1714. His maternal grandfather Delfino Noronha moved to Hong Kong from Macau about 1844 and established a successful printing business, Noronha and Co., which from 1859 until 1941 were printers to the Hong Kong Government.

Braga was born in Hong Kong on 3 August 1871, the eighth child of Vicente Emílio Braga and Carolina Maria Braga, née Noronha. His father was Chief Accountant at the Imperial Japanese Mint at Osaka, Japan, from 1871 to 1875 and then Instructor of Book Keeping in the Okurasho, the Finance Ministry in Tokyo until 1878. José Braga studied at the Italian Convent School (later known as the Sacred Heart Canossian College) and St. Joseph's College in Hong Kong. In 1888 he was sent to India and studied at St Xavier's College and Roberts College, Calcutta. In 1889 he sat for the Calcutta University Entrance Examination, was awarded a First Class pass, and won the only scholarship available to a European in the Province of Bengal. However, he was unable to take up this opportunity as three of his elder brothers died in a smallpox epidemic in Hong Kong and he had to return to help his grandfather in his printing business.

He worked at Noronha & Co. until his grandfather's death on 6 February 1900. In 1895 he published 'The Rights of Aliens in Hongkong', highly critical of the way Portuguese people were denied equal opportunities. In 1900 he went to Macau, where he taught English in the Commercial Institute for two years. In 1902 he was recruited by Robert Hotung as Manager of the Hongkong Telegraph and held this prominent position until 1910. In 1906 Braga became the Hong Kong correspondent for Reuters. He held the Reuter’s appointment for twenty-five years until 1931.

In 1910 he left the 'Hongkong Telegraph' and set up in business as a printer and as an importer of Chinese smallgoods. In the next 20 years he built up a prominent career as a journalist and printer and became a well-recognized leader of the Portuguese community in Hong Kong.

Braga was appointed a member of the Sanitary Board from 1927 to 1930. He was then the first Portuguese to be appointed to the Legislative Council, serving two terms between 1929 and 1937. Closely associated with the prominent businessman Sir Elly Kadoorie, he became Chairman of the Hongkong Engineering and Construction Company from 1930 to 1941. In these years the company developed what became the Kadoorie Estate in Kowloon. Its two roads, named in 1936, are Kadoorie Avenue and Braga Circuit.

He was also a board member of the China Light and Power Company, serving as chairman in 1934 and 1938.

He received recognition for his work in two communities: Macau and Hong Kong. In October 1929, he was appointed Comendador da Ordem de Cristo by the Portuguese government and was appointed an Officer of the Order of the British Empire (OBE) in 1935.

After the Japanese Occupation of Hong Kong in 1941, Braga went to Macau in 1942, where he spent his last two years writing the book he had long planned, The Portuguese in Hongkong and China.

On 5 May 1895, Braga married Olive Pauline Pollard (18 January 1870 Launceston, Tasmania, Australia - 13 February 1952, Hong Kong). They had 13 children. The eldest son, José Maria (Jack) Braga, became a well-known historian of the Portuguese in East Asia.

J.P. Braga died on 12 February 1944 in Macau and was buried in São Miguel Cemetery.

Political offices
Preceded by John Cecil Macgown	Member of the Sanitary Board; 1927–1930	Succeeded by R. A. de Castro Basto
Legislative Council of Hong Kong
New seat	Portuguese Unofficial Member; 1929–1937	Succeeded by Leo d'Almada e Castro
