= Leo d'Almada e Castro =

Chairman of the Hong Kong Bar Association

Leo d'Almada e Castro CBE QC JP
- 廖亞孖打/廖亞利孖打

Member of the Executive Council
- In office 1949 – 28 May 1959
- Appointed by: Alexander Grantham
- Succeeded by: Alberto Maria Rodrigues

Member of the Legislative Council
- In office 3 February 1937 – 13 November 1941
- Appointed by: Andrew Caldecott
- In office 1 May 1946 – 29 April 1953
- Appointed by: Mark Aitchison Young

Chairman of the Hong Kong Bar Association
- In office January 1961 – January 1963
- Preceded by: Lo Hin Shing
- Succeeded by: Brook Bernacchi
- In office January 1959 – January 1960
- Preceded by: John McNeill
- Succeeded by: Lo Hin Shing
- In office January 1957 – January 1958
- Preceded by: John McNeill
- Succeeded by: John McNeill
- In office January 1954 – January 1955
- Preceded by: Charles Loseby
- Succeeded by: John McNeill
- In office January 1951 – January 1952
- Preceded by: Charles Loseby
- Succeeded by: John McNeill

Personal details
- Born: 28 May 1904 Hong Kong
- Died: 1996 (aged 91-92) Portugal
- Spouse: Clothilde Belmira Barretto
- Education: St. Joseph's College; University of Hong Kong; Exeter College, Oxford
- Occupation: Barrister-at-law

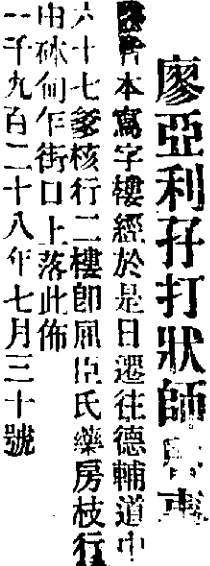
Historical Chinese-language newspaper advertisement or notice related to Leo d'Almada e Castro

Leonardo Horácio d'Almada e Castro Jr. CBE QC JP (Chinese: 廖亞孖打/廖亞利孖打; 28 May 1904 – 1996) was a barrister and prominent leader of the Portuguese community in Hong Kong.

== Biography ==
He was born in Hong Kong in the d'Alamda family which had existed since the British rule of Hong Kong in 1842. He was educated as St. Joseph's College and the University of Hong Kong. He later claimed he failed in completing his studies because of his laziness. He left for England and graduated in jurisprudence from the Exeter College, Oxford in 1926 and was called to the Bar as a member of the Middle Temple in 1927. He briefly lectured commercial law at the University of Hong Kong before he started practising law in Hong Kong. Until 1960, he was one of the only four Queen's Counsel practising in Hong Kong, the others were namely, John McNeil, Charles Loseby and Brook Bernacchi. He was appointed as an unofficial member in the Legislative Council of Hong Kong from 1937 to 1941 in the succession of José Pedro Braga and 1946 to 1953 after the war.

During the Second World War he lived in Macao and served as a liaison officer between the Portuguese and British governments in connection of refugees. He was appointed to the Hong Kong Planning Unit in London during the last years of the war after his difficult journey through Japanese-occupied China to India, and then to England. He served as President of the General Military Court during the short-term British military rule after the surrender of Japan in 1945. He became the first Hong Kong Portuguese King's Counsel in 1947 and his wife was appointed one of Hong Kong's first female Justices of the Peace at this time. In 1949, he was appointed to the Executive Council of Hong Kong.

He was also the member of the court of the University of Hong Kong from 1937 and President of the Hong Kong Bar Association five times from 1951 to 1962. In the business sector, he was the director of the China Light & Power Co., China Underwriters and Far East Investment, Vice-President of the Boy Scouts Association of Hong Kong, Member of the Lusitano Club and Club Recreio.

According to the Asia Who's Who in 1958, he lived in 12 Kadoorie Avenue, Kowloon.

Legislative Council of Hong Kong
Preceded by Jose Pedro Braga	Portuguese Unofficial Member; 1937–1941	Japanese occupation of Hong Kong
Preceded by Japanese occupation of Hong Kong	Unofficial Member; 1946–1953	Succeeded by Fung Ping-fan
