= Carlos Henrique Basto =

Portuguese businessman (1890–1944)

Carlos Henrique de Senna Fernandes Basto (27 March 1890 – 31 August 1944), also known as Charles Henrique de Basto, was a Macanese businessman and member of the Hong Kong Sanitary Board.

Basto was born in Sé, Macau, to José Maria de Castro e Basto and his wife, Casimira de Sena Fernandes Basto. His family was prominent among the Portuguese community in Hong Kong and Macau. He was educated in England, marrying Ellen Mary Cooper in London in 1912.

He was partner of the architect firm, Little, Adams & Wood. He later quit the company, formed his own firm Blackmore, Basto & Shank, and bought his previous firm's office on the top floor of the York Building on Chater Road in 1936.

He was uncontested elected to the Sanitary Board in October 1932 during the period when his younger brother, the incumbent R. A. de Castro Basto, left Hong Kong. He was nominated by Carlos Augusto de Roza and Rev. W. Walton Rogers of St. Andrew's Church. He was also the honorary consul for Bolivia in Hong Kong.

He had lived on 47 Granville Road, Kowloon, 163 Kowloon Tong. and 9 Devon Road, Kowloon Tong.

During the Japanese occupation Basto carried out espionage for the British, perhaps working for the British Army Aid Group He was arrested at the Club Lusitano on October 28, 1943. The investigators were able to prove that bridge problems in his possession were in fact coded messages describing Japanese troop movements. Basto maintained his innocence to the last, but he was found guilty at a mass trial on August 29, 1944, and executed two days later. He is memorialised at Stanley Military Cemetery.
