= Woo Pak-chuen =

Unofficial Member of the Executive and Legislative Council of Hong Kong

Woo Pak-chuen CBE JP
- 胡百全
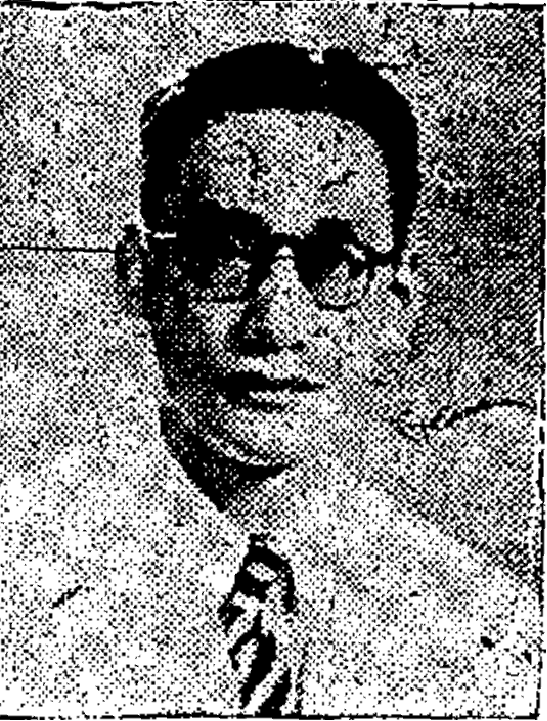
- Woo Pak-chuen ca. 1952

Unofficial Member of the Executive Council
- In office 1 July 1972 – 30 June 1976
- Appointed by: Sir Murray MacLehose
- Preceded by: Sir Kwan Cho-yiu
- Succeeded by: Lee Quo-wei

Unofficial Member of the Legislative Council
- In office 1 July 1964 – 30 June 1973
- Appointed by: Sir David Trench; Sir Murray MacLehose
- Preceded by: New seat
- Succeeded by: Lo Tak-shing

Personal details
- Born: 10 January 1910 Hong Kong
- Died: 30 April 2008 (aged 98) Hong Kong
- Party: Reform Club of Hong Kong
- Spouse: Laura Pun Fong Fung
- Children: Patricia Woo; Lana Woo; Patrick Woo; Rosalind Woo
- Education: St. Joseph's College; University of London
- Occupation: Politician and solicitor

Woo Pak-chuen CBE JP (Chinese: 胡百全; 10 January 1910 – 30 April 2008) was a prominent politician and lawyer of Hong Kong. He was former Unofficial Member of the Executive and Legislative Council of Hong Kong. From 1972 to 1973, he was the Senior Unofficial Member of the Legislative Council.

== Career ==
Woo graduated from St. Joseph's College, Hong Kong in 1928 and from the University of London in 1937. He was the first Chinese to be awarded a Ph.D. by the Faculty of Law of the University of London in 1939 and was the only practising lawyer in Hong Kong with a British Ph.D. in Law. In 1945, Woo founded his own law firm P C Woo & Co Solicitor and became the President of the Law Society of Hong Kong between 1959 and 1960.

In the 1953 municipal election, Woo ran for the four elected seats in the Urban Council of Hong Kong with Brook Bernacchi, Raymond Harry Shoon Lee and Philip Au for the Reform Club of Hong Kong. He continued to be reelected to the Urban Council until he was defeated to Hilton Cheong-Leen of the Hong Kong Civic Association. Woo was subsequently appointed to the Legislative Council of Hong Kong on 1 July 1964. He was reappointed in 1972 and was the Senior Unofficial Member for ten years until his retirement on 30 June 1973. He was appointed to the Executive Council of Hong Kong from 1972 to 1976.

Woo also oversaw the establishment of the Chinese University of Hong Kong with the contribution to the drafting of the Ordinance of the university and was a Life Council Member of the university since it was established as the Provisional Council. He had also been appointed member of the Board of Education of Hong Kong. He was also a Life Court Member of the University of Hong Kong since 1988. In 1974, he was awarded the honorary degree of the Doctor of Law by the Chinese University for his contribution to the education affairs.

Woo was also director in many public companies in Hong Kong. He was Independent Non-Executive Director of the Liu Chong Hing Bank from 1972 until he retired in 2004. He also held posts such as Director of the Sun Hung Kai Financial Limited and Chairman of the Kowloon Motor Bus Company and Hong Kong Yakult Company and various other posts.

== Family ==
Woo was son of the wealthy merchant Woo Hay-tong. His brother, Woo Pak-foo was also an Urban Councillor. He was also member of the influential Li family. He was the grandson-in-law's brother of the merchant Li Shek-pang, whose many family members were Executive and Legislative Councillors as well as judges and lawyers.

Political offices
Preceded by Kan Yuet-keung	Senior Unofficial Member of the Legislative Council; 1972–1973	Succeeded by Chung Sze-yuen
