= Alberto Rodrigues =

Hong Kong physician (1911–2006)

Sir Alberto Maria Rodrigues CBE ED FRCPE
- 羅理基

Senior Unofficial Member of the Executive Council
- In office 1962–1974
- Preceded by: Chau Sik-nin
- Succeeded by: Kan Yuet-keung

Member of the Legislative Council
- In office 20 May 1953 – 1 July 1959
- Appointed by: Alexander Grantham
- Preceded by: Leo d'Almada e Castro
- Succeeded by: Kwan Cho-yiu

Personal details
- Born: 5 November 1911 Hong Kong
- Died: 5 February 2006 (aged 94) Causeway Bay, Hong Kong
- Resting place: Surrey, British Columbia, Canada
- Spouse(s): Cynthia Maria Silvia; Ana Maria (Aninhas) de Azevedo de Castro Basto
- Education: St. Joseph's College; University of Hong Kong
- Occupation: Physician, politician

Sir Alberto Maria Rodrigues CBE ED FRCPE (Chinese: 羅理基, 5 November 1911 – 5 February 2006) was a Hong Kong medical doctor, academic and politician. He was Senior Unofficial Member of the Executive Council of Hong Kong, and Pro-Chancellor and Chairman of Executive Council of the University of Hong Kong.

== Early life and education ==
He was born on 5 November 1911. His mother's death occurred a few weeks after he was born, his father died when he was nine years old. He was brought up by an uncle who had seven children of his own.

He was educated at St Joseph's College, graduating in 1927, and he subsequently studied in the University of Hong Kong with the Inez Soares scholarship. He captained in the University Cricket Eleven and finished at the top of the League in 1932. Rodrigues also a Captain of Hockey and played hockey for Hong Kong. Although he was preoccupied with sporting activities, he passed his medical finals in 1934, receiving his degree and winning the Chan Kai Ming Prize. He studied paediatrics, obstetrics and gynaecology in Lisbon and London in the following three years before he began his private practice in Hong Kong in 1937.

He was a popular sportsman in cricket, tennis and badminton circles, represented Hong Kong at hockey both against Malaya and Macao.

== Public services ==
In the Urban Council election of 1940, he was elected to the Urban Council as the youngest member without aid from any organisation with a political platform. He resumed his office after the war until 1950 when he went to North America.

Dr. Rodrigues was member of the Hong Kong Volunteer Defence Corps and was held prisoner of war as lieutenant in Shamshuipo Camp during the Japanese occupation of Hong Kong. He was promoted to captain and was made a Member of the Order of the British Empire (Military Division) after the war. He was also rewarded with the Order of Christ by Portugal for his services to the Portuguese community in 1949.

In 1950, Dr. Rodrigues went to North America for further post-graduate work. After he returned to Hong Kong in 1953, he was appointed to the Legislative Council in 1959 and to Executive Council where he became the Senior Unofficial Member until his retirement in 1974. He was later on appointed Officer of the Order of the British Empire in 1960 and Commander of the Order the British Empire in 1964. He was also made a Chevalier of the French Legion of Honour in 1962 and made a Knight Grand Cross of the Roman Catholic Order of St. Sylvester in 1966. He was knighted by Queen Elizabeth II in 1971 in recognition of his immense contributions to the community of Hong Kong.

Dr. Rodrigues was appointed Chairman of the Golden Jubilee Celebrations of the University of Hong Kong in 1962. He was rewarded the Doctor of Laws honoris causa in the same year by the University of Hong Kong.

== Death ==
Dr. Rodrigues died at St. Paul's Hospital in Causeway Bay on 5 February 2006. He was pre-deceased by his first wife, Cynthia Maria Silvia in 1987, and by his second wife, Ana Maria (Aninhas) de Azevedo de Castro Basto in 2002. He was survived by his son Albert (Tito) and daughters Ann and Mari, several grandchildren and great-grandchildren. He was buried in the Catholic Cemeteries at the Gardens of Gethsemani in Surrey, British Columbia, Canada.

== Citations ==
Legislative Council of Hong Kong
Preceded by Leo d'Almada e Castro	Unofficial Member; 1953–1959	Succeeded by Kwan Cho-yiu
Political offices
Preceded by Chau Sik-nin	Senior unofficial member of the Executive Council of Hong Kong; 1962–1974	Succeeded by Kan Yuet-keung
