= Kowloon Residents' Association =

Kowloon Residents' Association 九龍居民協會
- President: F. C. Clemo (1971)
- Founder: B. L. Frost
- Founded: 20 January 1920
- Dissolved: c.1971
- Membership (1920): 122

The Kowloon Residents' Association was one of the earliest political organisations in Hong Kong history founded in 1920. It was also later known as the Hong Kong and Kowloon Resident's Association.

== History ==
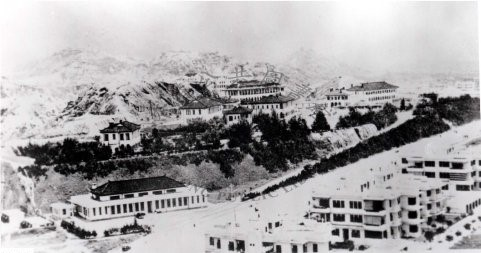
Kowloon Hospital in 1930s

It was formed by a group of Europeans residing on the Kowloon Peninsula, British Hong Kong on 20 January 1920. The group originally pressed for the control of high rent, providing recreational facilities, and more public works on the peninsula. For instance, they advocated the improvement of medical service on the Peninsula soon after founding, which the Kowloon Hospital was built five years later. In 1927, the Association asked the government for more public lights and stronger car headlights on the roadways in Kowloon.

Later on in the same year it held a joint committee with the Constitutional Reform Association of Hong Kong asking for representation in the Legislative Council but was rejected by the Governor Edward Stubbs.

Although claiming the authorities were unfamiliar with the needs of Kowloon locals, the Association only represented the interest of Kowloon Europeans and rarely protected the Chinese, which their suggestion on segregating Chinese and Europeans in Kowloon, similar to those in the Peak, could demonstrate so.

The Association continued into 1960s. But after an appeal in 1971 to attend future meetings, the group fell into obscurity.

== Election performance ==
Members of the Association participated in many public services including the Legislative Council and Sanitary Board (later Urban Council). José Pedro Braga and Ts'o Seen Wan, the member of the Sanitary Board and unofficial member of the Legislative Council were also the members of the Association. After the Pacific War when the Urban Council election held again in 1952, William Louey was elected but lost in re-election next year.

=== Urban Council elections ===
Election	Number of popular votes	% of popular votes	Total elected seats
1952	1,068	31.71	1 / 2
