= Chinese Cooperative Council =

- 華民各界協議會
- Predecessor: Rehabilitation Advisory Committee
- Formation: 1942
- Chairman: Chow Shouson
- Vice-Chairman: Li Koon-chun

Chinese Cooperative Council
- Traditional Chinese: 華民各界協議會
Transcriptions
Yue: Cantonese
- Yale Romanization: Wàah màhn gok gaai hip yíh wúih
- Jyutping: Waa4 man4 gok3 gaai3 hip3 ji5 wui5

The Chinese Cooperative Council was a civilian council consisting of local Chinese and Eurasian leaders during the Japanese occupation of Hong Kong.

== History ==
After conquering Hong Kong in December 1941, the Japanese moved to consolidate their power by collaborating with local Chinese leaders. In January 1942, a few weeks after the British surrender, Lieutenant General Takashi Sakai invited about 130 leading Chinese and Eurasian leaders in Hong Kong to a formal luncheon at the Peninsula Hotel in Kowloon. At the meeting, Saikai presented the idea of a Greater East Asia Co-Prosperity Sphere in which the Chinese and Japanese would cooperate with each other.

After Sakai was replaced by Lieutenant General Isogai Rensuke in late January 1942, two councils - the Chinese Representative Council and the Chinese Cooperative Council - were established, replacing the Rehabilitation Advisory Committee on 30 March 1942.

The Chinese Cooperative Council was chaired by Shouson Chow, a member of the Executive Council and Legislative Council before the war. The 22 members of the council were selected by a three-member (later four) Chinese Representative Council chaired by Sir Robert Kotewall.

The Chinese Cooperative Council reported directly to the Japanese governor. Its duties were to report complaints from the population, convey decisions and policies of the government and advise the government on matters concerning the population. Although the council met twice a week to discuss issues, it had limited power. All it could do was to make suggestions and try to persuade the government to accept them. It also headed the District Affairs Bureau Councils and wards, which were staffed by Chinese.

== Composition ==
- Shouson Chow, Chairman
- Li Koon-chun, Vice-Chairman
- Chau Tsun-nin
- Cheung Suk-shun
- Fung Tse-ying
- Ip Lan-chuen
- Kwok Chan
- Kwok Chuen
- Lam Kin-yan
- Li Chung-po
- Ling Hong-fat
- Lo Man-kam
- Luk Ngoi-wan
- Ng Wah
- Ngan Shing-kwan
- W. N. T. Tam
- Sze Kai-tung
- Tang Shiu-kin
- Tung Chung-wei
- Wong Tak-kwong
- Wong Tung-ming
- Wong Ying-ching
