= D. F. Landale =

British-Hong Kong politician and businessman

D. F. Landale D·F·蘭杜

Senior unofficial member of the Legislative Council of Hong Kong
- In office 1 May 1946 – 4 January 1950
- Preceded by: British Military Administration
- Succeeded by: Chau Tsun-nin
- Appointed by: Sir Mark Young

Personal details
- Born: 9 November 1905 Shanghai International Settlement, China
- Died: 15 December 1970 (aged 65) London, United Kingdom
- Spouse(s): Louisa Mary Dorothy Charlotte Forbes (m. 1929; died 1956) Beatrice Helen Bengson Lund
- Children: 4
- Parent: David Landale (father)
- Occupation: Entrepreneur and politician

D. F. Landale
- Traditional Chinese: 蘭杜
- Simplified Chinese: 兰杜
Transcriptions
Standard Mandarin
- Hanyu Pinyin: Landu
Yue: Cantonese
- Jyutping: Laan^{4}dou^{6}

David Fortune "Taffy" Landale, JP (Chinese: 蘭杜; 7 November 1905 – 15 December 1970), was a British-Hong Kong entrepreneur and politician who was chairman and managing director of Jardine Matheson & Co. from 1945 to 1951, during which he was appointed by the Hong Kong government as an unofficial member of the Executive Council from 1946 to 1951, as well as the senior unofficial member of the Legislative Council from 1946 to 1950. Later in his life he settled in the United Kingdom, where he was chairman of the Royal Bank of Scotland between 1955 and 1965.

Landale had a close connection with Jardine Matheson. His father, David Landale, was also chairman and managing director of the firm, and the Landales were distantly related to the family of Dr William Jardine, who was the founder of the Jardine trading house. Landale's chairmanship of Jardine Matheson coincided with the outbreak of the Chinese Communist Revolution that followed the end of the Second World War. The turbulence prevented the firm from reviving the profitable China business that it had enjoyed in the past. In 1947, he founded the Hong Kong Airways with a hope of developing the firm's civil aviation business. The attempt, however, was hit by the growing instability of the region.

As the senior unofficial member of the Legislative Council, Landale was an active critic of the Hong Kong government who was noted for his unsuccessful attempt to oppose the government's plan of re-introducing income tax after the war in 1947. Besides, he moved a motion in the Council in 1949 to debate the "Young Plan". The plan, which proposed for the idea of setting up a Municipal Council, was highly questioned by him and other unofficial members, who believed that reforming the Legislative Council would be a better alternative. Nevertheless, having considered the regional instability and the lukewarm response from the general public, the British government announced in 1952 that no major constitutional reform would take place in Hong Kong.

== Biography ==
=== Early years ===
Landale was born in the Jardine Matheson office in the Shanghai International Settlement, China, on 7 November 1905. He was the son of David Landale (1868–1935) of Dalswinton, Dumfries, Scotland, and Mildred Sophia Fortune (1880–1965). He had two sisters and one brother, namely Margaret Winifred Landale (1903–1989), Veronica Grizel Kinloch Landale (1911–1985) and Peter Wellwood Fortune Landale (1915–1941). His brother, a pilot of the Royal Air Force during the Second World War, died in a plane crash in the North Sea when he was flying to Hanover, Germany, on a military mission in 1941. His body was never found.

The Landales were closely connected to Jardine Matheson & Co., the Far Eastern trading firm. Landale's father, David Landale, was the son of the Rev David Landale and Margaret Helen Hassels Jardine, who was a daughter of Sir William Jardine, 7th Baronet. Sir William belonged to the Applegirth branch of the Jardine family and he was a distant relative of Dr William Jardine, the founder of the Jardine trading house. Landale's father had a long career in Jardine Matheson, serving for a time as chairman and managing Director of the firm. He was also chairman of the Shanghai Municipal Council as well as an unofficial member of both the Executive and Legislative Councils of Hong Kong. Landale Street in Wan Chai, Hong Kong, was named after him.

Early in his life, Landale, who was also known as "Taffy" by his relatives and friends, attended Eton College, and later studied at Balliol College, Oxford. While at Eton and Oxford, he was a keen sports player, serving as a member of the cricket team of Eton and captain of the university rugby team.

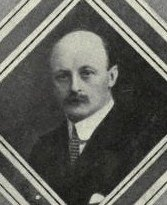
David Landale

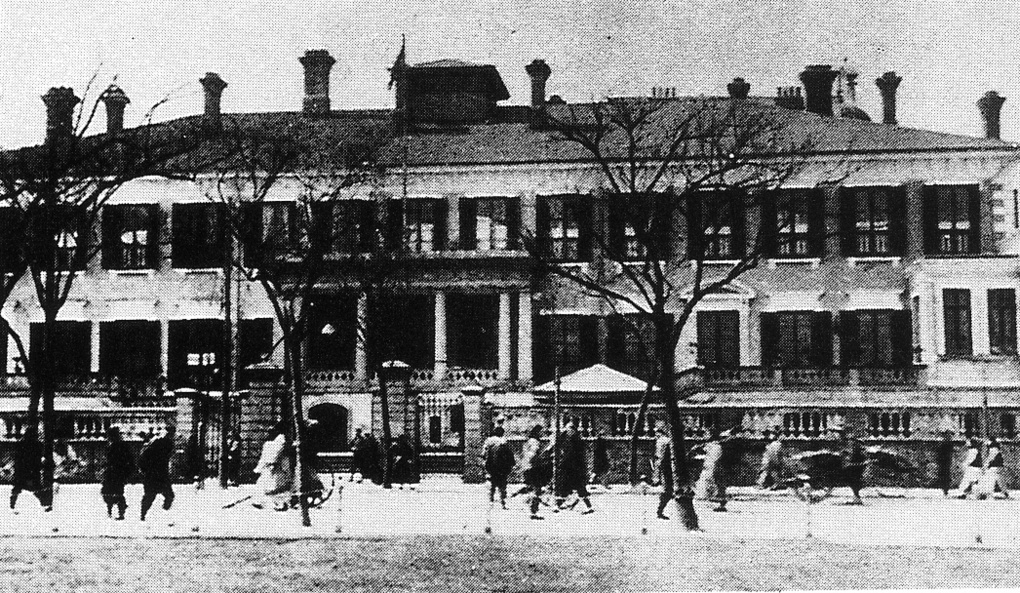
The Jardine Matheson office in the Shanghai International Settlement, where D. F. Landale was born on 7 November 1905

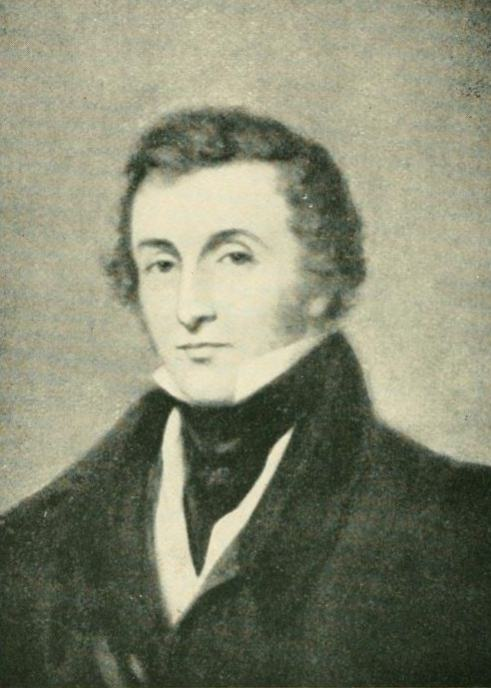
Sir William Jardine

=== Far Eastern career ===
After graduation and a short stint working in London, Landale followed the footsteps of his father to join Jardine Matheson in the Far East. He started from the cash desk, spending his time mainly in Shanghai and Hong Kong, and was eventually appointed a director of the firm in 1936, a position that he held until his death in 1970. As a member of the board, he was also appointed to the directorships of a number of subsidiary and affiliated companies of Jardine Matheson, such as the Indo-China Steam Navigation Company Ltd. He was appointed an unofficial Justice of the Peace by the Hong Kong government in 1937. At that time, the future prospect of the firm was shadowed by uncertainties arising from the outbreak of the Sino-Japanese War and the increasing instability in the Far East. When the Second World War broke out in 1939, he was enlisted to the Hong Kong Defence Reserve. Yet, he was permitted to quit the Reserve in the following year to join the Royal Naval Volunteer Reserve. He was stationed on HMS Queen Elizabeth and saw active service until 1943, when he retired from the Volunteer Reserve as a lieutenant and was appointed as the Minister of War Transport Representative in the Middle East. His role was to help co-ordinate logistical support and transportation for the Allied Forces in that region. He held that position until the war ended in 1945. In the same year, he returned to Hong Kong, where he served briefly as the first Honorary Air Commodore of the Air Arm of the Hong Kong Volunteer Defence Corps.

In 1945, Landale succeeded J. J. Paterson to become chairman and managing director of Jardine Matheson with a view to re-establishing the firm's business interests in Hong Kong, China, Japan and other places in the Far East. In that capacity, he was also appointed a member of the Hong Kong General Chamber of Commerce as well as director of a number of private companies, including the Hongkong Electric Company. His chairmanship, however, coincided with the outbreak of the Chinese Communist Revolution that followed the end of the Second World War. During the turbulence, the Canton branch office of Jardine Matheson was burnt down in an anti-British protest in 1948. Despite that, by the time when the People's Republic of China was founded by the Chinese Communist Party in 1949, the firm still managed to maintain its China head office in Shanghai as well as its branch offices in Hankou, Fuzhou, Qingdao, Tianjin, Canton and Shantou, employing some 20,000 employees and having a total asset of around 30 million pound sterling in the mainland. After 1949, the firm's businesses continued to be severely hit by the political instability in China. And when the Korean War broke out in 1950, Landale was forced to move the headquarters of Jardine Engineering Corporation from Shanghai to Hong Kong in face of the worsening relationship between China and the Western countries. By 1955, Jardine Matheson had to abandon the China market completely following a number of anti-capitalist political campaigns staged by the Communist Party, most notably the "Land Reform Campaign" and the "Three-anti and Five-anti Campaigns". The retreat was a bitter blow to the firm.

Having experienced the turbulence in China, Landale tried to explore new business opportunities in Hong Kong during his chairmanship of Jardine Matheson. In 1947, the firm reached an agreement with British Overseas Airways Corporation (BOAC) to establish Hong Kong Airways as an attempt to develop Hong Kong's civil aviation business. At first, the airline was a subsidiary of BOAC and Landale was appointed to chair the board of directors. Further agreement was made between BOAC and the firm in 1949 to formally transfer the ownership of the airline to the latter, with Landale continuing to chair the board of directors. Nevertheless, like the firm's other businesses in China, the airline was badly hit by the instability in China and Korea as its flight services to the two countries, which formed the major network of the airline, were forced to be either discontinued or suspended. The airline was subsequently sold to its main local rival Cathay Pacific Airways, which was controlled by Butterfield & Swire Co., in 1958.

=== Political career ===
Apart from his business interests, Landale was appointed an unofficial member of the Executive Council, from 1946 to 1951, and the senior unofficial member of the Legislative Council, from 1946 to 1950, by the Hong Kong government, being one of the first unofficial members appointed when civilian government resumed after the war in May 1946. As an active critic of the government, he openly criticised the government in the Legislative Council meetings for a number of times, such as to blame the government for the perfunctory way it compiled the annual Budget and for its failure to maintain effective communication between Hong Kong and Whitehall in London, of which he thought was a key factor to achieve good governance. In 1947, the government started to require an increase in the extent of developments on some of the Rural Buildings Lots in offering re-grants to landowners, as a measure to cope with the influx of refugees from mainland China and the housing shortage. The measure was complained by Landale as oppressive to the landowners due to the higher construction costs that they had to bear.

Besides, Landale was one of the leading businessmen in the colony who repeatedly opposed the introduction of income tax. As early as during the Second World War, the government proposed for the introduction of the tax to support the British war effort in Europe and to subsidise the local defence budget. Landale was one of the members who were appointed to the War Revenue Committee by the government in October 1939, which was tasked to offer advice on the proposed new tax. The Committee later submitted its report in February 1940 in which Landale and other members expressed strong reservations about the tax proposal. Despite their reservations, the government eventually managed to secure the support of the Committee to introduce the income tax in April 1940, having promised that the tax, as an interim measure to generate war revenue, would be repealed after the war. Ironically, although the government did repeal the tax after the war as promised, the tax was soon re-introduced in 1947, a move which was strongly opposed by Landale and other unofficial members of the Legislative Council. In response to the tax proposal, Landale requested that it should be put on hold for a year to have sufficient time for further review, but his request was turned down by the government. After heated debates, the bill to reintroduce the tax was read a third time and was passed in the Legislative Council in May 1947, notwithstanding that it was rarely voted against by three unofficial members, namely Chau Tsun-nin, Chau Sik-nin and Leo d'Almada e Castro. Landale, however, was compelled to vote for the Bill during the division.

Landale also took part in the debates on the "Young Plan" during his service in the two Councils. The plan was named after the Governor of Hong Kong Sir Mark Young, who unveiled it in 1946. One of the major proposals as recommended in the plan was to establish a Municipal Council that would have a certain number of elected seats. Nevertheless, as the public opinion at the time could not agree on the breadth and depth of the constitutional reform, the plan was stalled for more than two years. It was already March 1949 when Landale moved a motion in the Legislative Council to revive the debate on the "Young Plan". In the debate, he criticised the government for deliberately slowing down the pace of constitutional reform. He described the government as the "Dormouse", a character in the novel Alice in Wonderland, which would wake up to disclose a little bit more about the whole story only when the "Hatter" pours hot tea upon its nose. Landale agreed that constitutional reform was needed for Hong Kong, but instead of supporting the "Young Plan", he believed that reforming the Legislative Council would be a more practical alternative than setting up the Municipal Council. In June the same year, another unofficial member of the Legislative Council, Lo Man-kam, proposed his own reform plan, in which he argued that there should be more unofficial seats in the Legislative Council and some of these seats should be elected. This plan gained the support of all the unofficial members, who had by that time already made themselves clear that they opposed the "Young Plan". Yet, having considered the regional instability and the lukewarm response from the general public, Young's successor, Sir Alexander Grantham, concluded that it was not an appropriate time to implement the reform plan. He particularly feared that Hong Kong would be drawn into the political row between the Chinese Communist Party and the Kuomintang if there was a constitutional reform. Finally, the British government told the Parliament in October 1952 that except for increasing the number of elected seats in the Urban Council, no major constitutional reform would take place in Hong Kong.

=== Later years ===
Landale resigned from the Legislative Council in 1950. He retired from the Executive Council as well as the chairmanship of Jardine Matheson the next year, but he retained a seat in the board of directors of the firm. After that, he resided in the United Kingdom, where he was appointed to the directorships of a number of private corporations which counted on his business experience in the Far East. Among them, he joined the board of directors of the Royal Bank of Scotland in 1952, becoming deputy chairman of the board later, and he was appointed chairman of the board from 1955 to 1965. During his chairmanship, he was also appointed director of a number of firms which had close ties with the Royal Bank of Scotland, such as the Northern Assurance Co. Ltd., Glyn, Mills & Co. and William Deacon's Bank Ltd., etc. Apart from that, he was a director of the British Investment Trust Limited, from 1952 to 1970.

Although Landale lived in his hometown of Dalswinton, Dumfries, Scotland, he continued to travel to London frequently to manage his business interests. Between 1967 and 1970, he was also appointed by the government as a member of the Review Body on the Remuneration of Doctors and Dentists. In his leisure time he was a keen farmer and forester in his hometown. He died suddenly in London on 15 December 1970 at the age of 65. After his death, his family erected a memorial cairn for him in Dalswinton Wood.

== Personal life ==
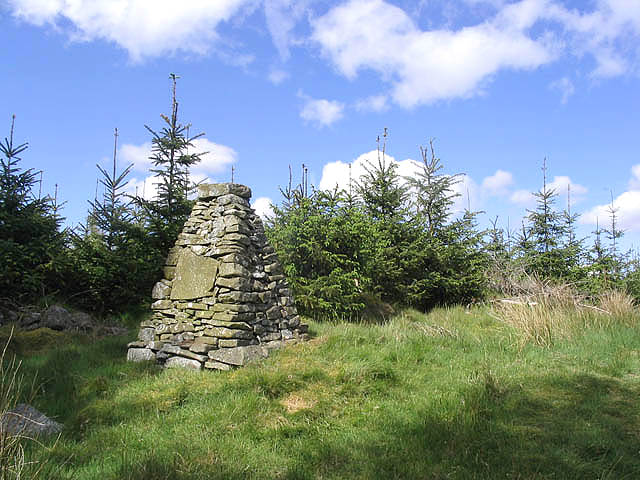
The cairn in memory of Landale in Dalswinton Wood, Dumfries, Scotland

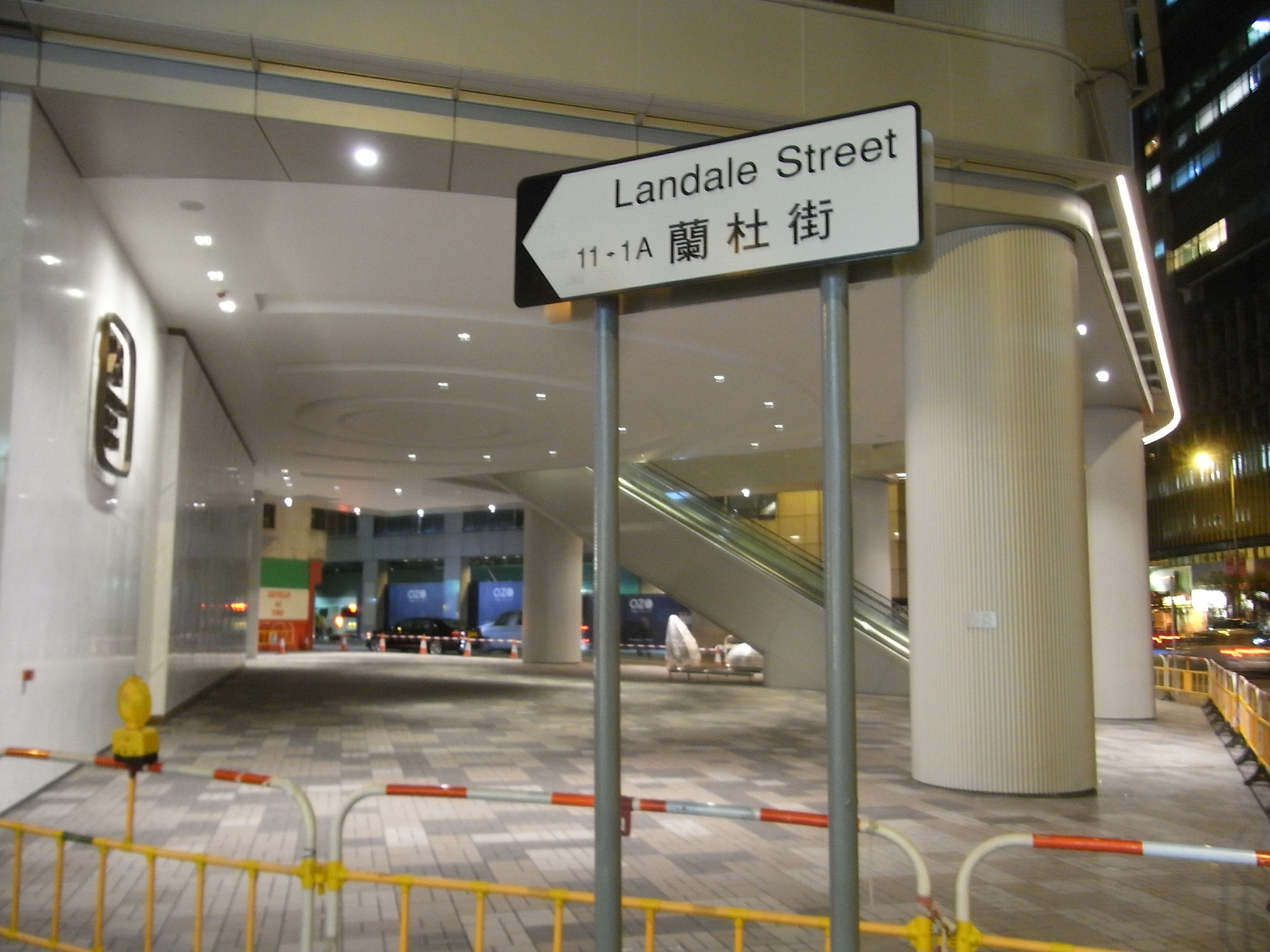
Landale Street in Wan Chai, Hong Kong, named after Landale's father, David

Landale was married in London to Louisa Mary Dorothy Charlotte Forbes (1904–1956), the younger daughter of Charles William Forbes of Callendar House, on 7 December 1929. The couple had one son and three daughters:

1. Janet Stewart Landale (30 August 1930 – 1 January 2010);
2. Sir David William Neil Landale (27 May 1934 – 25 March 2016), a director of Jardine Matheson between 1967 and 1975;
3. Linda Louisa Landale (born 2 November 1937); and
4. Kirsteen Forbes Landale (born 28 May 1944)

Louisa was the Chief Commissioner of the Hong Kong Girl Guides Association from 1948 to 1951. After her death in 1956, Landale was married in London, secondly, to Beatrice Helen Bengson Lund, the widow of K. Lund. Besides, Landale was a member of the Queen's Bodyguard for Scotland, the Royal Company of Archers. He was also a member of a number of gentlemen's clubs, including Boodle's and Pratt's in London, as well as the New Club in Edinburgh. In 1946, Landale purchased a ketch in Hong Kong. The ketch, known as Jadalinkir, was christened after his four children "Janet", "David", "Linda" and "Kirsteen".

== Honours ==
- Unofficial Justice of the Peace (J.P.) (1937)

== See also ==
- Jardine Matheson
- Hong Kong Airways
- David Landale
- John Johnstone Paterson

== Footnotes ==
Business positions
Preceded by J. J. Paterson	Chairman and Managing Director of Jardine Matheson & Co. 1945–1951	Succeeded by John Keswick
Preceded by Kenneth Murray	Chairman of the Royal Bank of Scotland; 1955–1965	Succeeded by James Ogilvie Blair-Cunynghame
Political offices
Preceded by British Military Administration, Hong Kong	Senior unofficial member of the Legislative Council of Hong Kong; 1946–1950	Succeeded by Chau Tsun-nin
Other offices
Preceded by New creation	Honorary Air Commodore of the Air Arm of the Hong Kong Volunteer Defence Corps; 1945	Succeeded by S. E. Faber
