= Tso Seen-wan =

Hong kong lawyer (1868–1953)

Tso Seen-wan CBE JP
- 曹善允
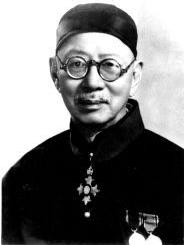

Senior Chinese Unofficial Member of the Legislative Council
- In office 3 October 1935 – 17 January 1937
- Governor: Andrew Caldecott
- Preceded by: Robert Kotewall
- Succeeded by: Chau Tsun-nin

Member of the Legislative Council
- In office 3 May 1929 – 17 January 1937
- Appointed by: Cecil Clementi
- President: Andrew Caldecott

Member of the Sanitary Board
- In office 1918–1929

Personal details
- Born: November 10, 1868 Portuguese Macau
- Died: January 20, 1953 (aged 84) Hong Kong Sanatorium & Hospital, Happy Valley, Hong Kong
- Occupation: Lawyer, businessman, businessman, educationalist

Tso Seen-wan
- Chinese: 曹善允
Transcriptions
Standard Mandarin
- Hanyu Pinyin: Cáo Shànyǔn
Yue: Cantonese
- Yale Romanization: Chou^{4} Sin^{6} Wan^{5}
- Jyutping: cou4 sin6 wan5

Tso Seen-wan, CBE, JP (Chinese: 曹善允, 10 November 1868 – 20 January 1953), also Ts'o Seen Wan, S. W. Tso or S. W. Ts'o, was a distinguished Hong Kong lawyer, politician, businessman and educationalist.

Formerly served in Legislative Council, Sanitary Board and District Watch Force, Tso greatly contributed to Hong Kong's education and medical care in the early 20th century. He raised fund for several colleges, including the University of Hong Kong, and co-founded Alice Memorial Hospital and Ho Miu Ling Hospital.

== Early years ==
Tso Seen-wan was born on 10 November 1868 in Portuguese Macau with ancestral hometown in Heungshan, Kwangtung, eldest son of Tso Wai-chuen (Chinese: 曹渭泉), a well-known merchant of that territory who was the first Chinese in Macau decorated by the King of Portugal with the Insignia of "Comenda de Nossa Senhora da Conceição", who also received the Honorary title of the 2nd Degree with the Red Button and Peacock's Feather conferred on him by Guangxu, the Emperor of China, in 1880.

After finishing his studies in Macau, Dr. Tso went to Shanghai where he received higher Chinese education. He went to England in 1886 with the financial support of prominent businessman Wei Yuk, and entered Cheltenham College. In due time he passed his law examinations and was connected with well-known law firms and was enrolled as a solicitor of the Supreme Court of Judicature of England before returning to Hong Kong in 1897 where he set up his own law practice after recognised as solicitor in Hong Kong. He was joined by P. M. Hodgson in 1927 under the firm name of Messrs. Ts'o and Hodgson. Through his association with two leading members of the Chinese community, Ho Kai and Wei Yuk, he soon became a leader in the public affairs of the Colony of Hong Kong.

== Social services ==
=== Educational ===
Tso actively contributed to local social services, with chief interest in educational, especially Western education, and medical work among the Chinese.

Tso, along with others, co-founded St Stephen's College and St. Stephen's Girls' College in 1903 and 1904 and sat as council member of both, whose students from the former college could continue their study in Britain.

Tso was also appointed to the council of St. Paul's College in 1913, and twice handled the fund-raising for college's expansion in 1918 and 1925. He advocated the foundation of Government Vernacular Middle School, the first Chinese language government school opened in 1926. Tso co-founded Munsang College in Kowloon during the development of Kai Tak in 1926, served as the chairman-for-life of the college council until his death.

Another major contribution to the education is the founding of the University of Hong Kong (HKU). Tso was the Honorary Secretary of the 1909-created Chinese sub-committee to raise the Endowment Fund, and donated 500 HKD as contribution. Tso had been an active member to the University Court, Council and different Commissions of the University of Hong Kong after HKU established in 1911 despite early rejections. He was also a member of the Board of Control of both St. John's Hall and Morrison Hall, the University Hostels. Tso was conferred with Honorary Doctorate in Law for his work in 1924 by HKU.

In April 1920, Tso was appointed to the Board of Education of Hong Kong soon after its creation by Governor Stubbs, and served until April 1940.

=== Medical ===
In the early colonial era, Chinese were inaccessible to Western medical service due to the limited hospitals in the colony. Tso therefore urged the expansion of hospital service. After appointed as financial director of Alice Memorial Hospital, Tso helped the foundation of affiliated maternity hospital and nursing school, with the addition of Ho Miu Ling Hospital in 1900s. He chaired Alice Memorial Hospital in 1930 and again raised fund for the relocation of Nethersole Hospital.

In 1910, Tso was elected to be Chinese Public Dispensary Committee (Chinese: 華人公立醫局委員會) member, and chaired the board of director of Sai Wan Public Dispensary from 1911. During his chairman tenure, he enormously helped the medical services of Western District, including the cowpox vaccination campaign in 1915 and 1916 after smallpox disease spread in the district. The infection wave ended with the vaccination effort, and is said to have helped lowering the infection rate in the next two decades.

Tsan Yuk Hospital, then located in Sai Ying Pun, was established with Tso's effort to meet the maternity demand. Tso was named as the supervisor of the new hospital thereafter.

=== Public offices ===
The Board of Management of The Chinese Permanent Cemeteries was formed in 1913 by local Chinese elites, including Tso, after their petition to the Hong Kong Government of reserving land for cemeteries. Tso was elected as Honorary Manager in 1919.

A year prior to be named as Honorary Manager, he was appointed as Sanitary Board member, and as non-official Justice of the Peace on 17 April 1918.

Canton–Hong Kong strike started in 1925 with as many as 200,000 workers joined in solidarity during the peak, of more than half left Hong Kong for Canton. Colonial government hence named Tso as Tung Wah Hospital advisor, Po Leung Kuk and District Watch Force gentry member (Chinese: 紳士) for negotiations with workers, later as Controller of Labour tasked with sustaining the labour force. Named as Police Reserve unit commander in 1914 and first Chinese Honorary Director, Tso organised policing on street during the large-scale strike.

As the strike ended, Tso was promoted by the Government for his success. Tso exited Sanitary Board in 1929 and was appointed by reformist Governor Cecil Clementi as Legislative Council unofficial member, becoming the first to represent Kowloon community. He was chosen as Po Leung Kuk director-for-life and vice-chairman of newly-established Hong Kong Society for the Protection of Children in the same year; as vice-chairman of Hong Kong Playground Association and head of Hong Kong Rotary Club in 1933.

Tso became the leading Chinese member in Legislative Council in 1936 until his exit on 17 January 1937. During then, Tso strongly objected to the repeal of censorship for Chinese newspaper proposed by another Chinese colleague Lo Man-kam, by claiming no complaints were made by the papers, and that Chinese community could be easily incited by radical articles. His comments received large criticism by the Chinese. Tso was awarded with Order of the British Empire in 1928 and CBE in 1935 Birthday Honours. In 1937, Tso, once a member for Edward VII and George V coronation celebration committee in 1902 and 1911, was invited by the Hong Kong Government to represent the Chinese of Hong Kong at the coronation of King George VI and Queen Elizabeth on 12 May.

== Later years ==
During Battle of Hong Kong, Tso continued his service for the Hong Kong Government until Hong Kong fallen into Japanese army in December 1941. Tso rejected Japanese's invitation and left for Macau later. After Hong Kong liberated in 1945, Tso returned to Hong Kong immediately and helped the reconstruction of schools. He retired from the University of Hong Kong (only to be reappointed as Council member-for-life) and revoked his solicitor license in 1951 due to vision loss and other sicknesses.

Tso, aged 84, died thirty minutes after noon on 20 January 1953 at Hong Kong Sanatorium and Hospital. He was survived by his widow, four sons and three daughters. His funeral was held on 22 January with large crowds mourned his death. Chief Justice Gerard Lewis Howe, Attorney General Arthur Ridehalgh, Chairperson of Bar Association Leo d'Almada e Castro lead the tributes paid to Tso. Governor Alexander Grantham described Tso as generous, virtuous, and highly respected among Chinese and Europeans.

He was made Justice of the Peace in 1918. He was created an Officer of the Order of the British Empire by King George VI in 1928 and Commander of the same Order in 1935.

== Awards ==
- Officer of the Order of the British Empire (OBE), 1928 Birthday Honours; Commander of the Order of the British Empire (CBE), 1935 Birthday Honours
- King George VI Coronation Medal

Legislative Council of Hong Kong
New seat	Chinese Unofficial Member; 1929–1937	Succeeded by Li Shu-fan
