= Wilson Wang =

Hong Kong businessman (1918–1998)

Wilson Wang OBE, JP
- 王澤森

Unofficial Member of the Legislative Council of Hong Kong
- In office 1 July 1968 – 1 April 1970
- Appointed by: Sir David Trench
- Succeeded by: Kenneth Lo

Personal details
- Born: 27 April 1918 Swatow, Republic of China
- Died: 1998 (aged 79–80)
- Spouse: Li Ming-tsun
- Children: 4
- Education: St. Stephen's College; University of Hong Kong
- Occupation: School proprietor and supervisor

Wilson Wang Tze-sam, OBE, JP (Chinese: 王澤森; 27 April 1918 – 1998) was a Hong Kong businessman and an unofficial member of the Legislative Council of Hong Kong.

== Biography ==
Wang was born on 27 April 1918 in Swatow, China. He was educated at the St. Stephen's College, Hong Kong and received a Bachelor of Science from the University of Hong Kong in 1941. He married Li Ming-tsun in 1946 at Chungking and had four sons.

He was first awarded Badge of Honour in 1958 and unofficial Justice of the Peace in 1961. In the same year, he was appointed member of the Urban Council and the Housing Authority. He had also sat on the Library Advisory Committee since 1961. Other public positions he held included member of the Working Party on the School Medical Service in 1962, member of the Board of Education from 1958 to 1960 and from 1964 to 1965, member of the School Medical Service Board in 1963, member of the Duke of Edinburgh's Award Committee in 1962, and member of the Working Party of the Education Commission in 1964. He was appointed unofficial member of the Legislative Council in 1968, in which he served until 1970 when he resigned and was succeeded by barrister Kenneth Lo Tak-cheung.

He was also a member of the St. John's Ambulance Association Committee since 196. He was the director (1954–55), principal director (1955–57) and the chairman (1957–58) of the Tung Wah Group of Hospitals. He was the chairman of the Hong Kong Private Anglo-Chinese Schools for several occasions in the 1950s and early 60s. From 1958 to 1960, Wang had been the vice-president and president 1959–60 of the South China Athletic Association. After his retirement in 1961, he was named honorary president of the association. He was also chairman and president of the Tung Wah Athletic Association and Hong Kong Cycling Association.

He also had sat on educational-related positions. For instance, he was the member of the Aberdeen Technical School Executive Committee in 1957 and 63, president of the St. Stephen's Old Boys' Association in 1959, president of the Hong Kong Boy Scouts Eastern District from 1962, director of the Victoria Park School for the Deaf and the United College. He was also the founder, proprietor and supervisor of the New Method College & High School and the New Method English Tutorial Day & Evening School, Hongkong & Kowloon. He died in 1998.

== Honours ==
In 1971, he was awarded Officer of the Order of the British Empire (OBE) for his public services in Hong Kong. For his contributions, the Ninetieth Anniversary Dr. Wilson Wang Tse-sam Library of the St. Stephen's College, Hong Kong and the Dr. Wilson Wang Tse-sam Sports & Recreation Centre and the Wilson Wang Sports Centre of the St. Stephen's College Preparatory School, as well as the Tung Wah Group of Hospitals Wilson T.S. Wang Centre of Integrated Health Management, were named after him.
