= Lo Man-wai =

Hong Kong lawyer and politician

Lo Man-wai CBE (1895 – 5 April 1985) was a prominent lawyer and politician in Hong Kong who served as a member of the Executive Council and Legislative Council of Hong Kong.

== Biography ==
Lo Man-wai was born in 1895 in Hong Kong. His father was the wealthy Hong Kong merchant and compradore of Jardine, Matheson & Co., Lo Cheung-shiu. His brother, Lo Man-kam, was also a prominent lawyer who served on the Executive and Legislative Councils of Hong Kong prior to the 1950s.

Man-wai was educated at Queen's College. After graduating, he went to England to study law along with his brother. In 1916, they returned to Hong Kong and founded the law firm Lo and Lo.

He had three sons and a daughter. His second son, Kenneth Lo Tak-cheung, later joined Lo and Lo and became a member of the Urban Council.

During the Canton–Hong Kong strike, Lo and his brother Lo Man-kam joined the Hong Kong Volunteer Defence Corps, and more Hong Kong Chinese followed.

Man-wai was appointed a Justice of the Peace in 1926 and a member of the Urban Council in 1940. After the war, he succeeded Lo Man-kam's seat on the Legislative Council in 1950 and the Executive Council in 1959. For his services, he was named an Officer and Commander of the Order of the British Empire in 1950 and 1955, respectively.

He was a director of many large public companies, including Hongkong Tramways, Star Ferry, China Light and Power Company, Hongkong and Kowloon Wharf and Godown Company, and Commercial Radio Hong Kong.

A skilled tennis player, he was known as the "Grand Old Man of Hong Kong Tennis." With his brother Lo Man-kam, he won the Men's Doubles title at the 1920 Hong Kong National Grass Court Championships, as well as the singles title in 1929. From 1920 to 1922, he was runner-up to Ng Sze-kwong three years in a row in Men's Singles at the Hong Kong National Grass Court Championships. With his sister Enid, he won the Mixed Doubles title at the Hong Kong Hardcourt Championships in 1928, 1930 and 1932, thus becoming the only player in Hong Kong to have won a local doubles title with both his brother and sister.

Lo Man-wai died on 5 April 1985. His funeral took place at the Hong Kong Funeral Home and his body was cremated at Cape Collinson Crematorium on 11 April.

== See also ==
- Four big families of Hong Kong

Legislative Council of Hong Kong
Preceded by Man-kam Lo	Chinese Unofficial Member; 1950–1959	Succeeded by Richard Charles Lee
Political offices
Preceded by Sik-nin Chau	Chinese Unofficial Member of the Executive Council of Hong Kong; 1959–1961; With: Chau Tsun-nin	Succeeded by Kwan Cho-yiu
