= Kenneth Fung =

Politician & Businessman in Hong Kong

Sir Kenneth Fung CBE, KStJ, LLD, DSocSc, JP
- 馮秉芬

Unofficial Member of the Executive Council of Hong Kong
- In office 28 May 1962 – 30 June 1972
- Appointed by: Sir Robert Black; Sir David Trench
- Preceded by: Chau Sik-nin
- Succeeded by: Chung Sze-yuen

Unofficial Member of the Legislative Council of Hong Kong
- In office 8 July 1959 – 23 June 1965
- Appointed by: Sir Robert Black; Sir David Trench

Personal details
- Born: 28 May 1911 British Hong Kong
- Died: 16 May 2002 (aged 90) Hong Kong Adventist Hospital, Happy Valley, Hong Kong
- Spouse(s): Lady Ivy Fung Kan Shiu-han, OBE
- Children: Fung Hing-lun, Lawrence; Dr. Fung Hing-biu, Robert; Fung Hing-cheung, Kenneth, BBS; Fung Hing-chiu, Cyril; Fung Chi-yee, Angela (Bender)
- Education: University of Hong Kong
- Occupation: Businessman, politician, philanthropist

Sir Kenneth Fung Ping-fan, CBE, KStJ, LLD, DSocSc, JP (Chinese: 馮秉芬; 28 May 1911 – 16 May 2002) was a prominent Hong Kong politician and businessman.

== Biography ==
Fung was born on 28 May 1911 to Fung Ping-shan, a co-founder of the Bank of East Asia, with his twin brother Fung Ping-wah. He graduated from School of Chinese Studies at the University of Hong Kong in 1931.

He took up his family business after his father's death in 1931, becoming the general manager and the director of his family business, the Bank of East Asia. At 28 Fung also established the Fung Ping Fan Group, which in 1975 bought a McDonald's franchise and introduced the fast-food chain to what was then the British colony of Hong Kong. He co-founded the Ocean Park Hong Kong and was a founding chairman of the park.

From 1951 to 1960 he was the appointed unofficial member of the Urban Council of Hong Kong. He was appointed to the Legislative Council of Hong Kong in 1959, in which he served until 1965. From 1962 to 1972 he was the unofficial member of the Executive Council of Hong Kong. For his public services in Hong Kong, Fung was knighted in 1971.

Fung was the founder and president of Hong Kong's World Wide Fund for Nature and was district governor of Rotary International. He was among the first members of the Photographic Society of Hong Kong when it was formed in 1937. He was involved closely in the work of the Scout movement and of the Y.M.C.A. He is a past commissioner of the St. John Ambulance Brigade and was the first chairman of the Duke of Edinburgh's Award Scheme in Hong Kong. He became a member of the Court of the University of Hong Kong in 1948. In 1969 he was given an honorary degree of doctor of social sciences. In 1973 he received the American Academy of Achievement’s Golden Plate Award.

Fung died on 16 May 2002 at the Hong Kong Adventist Hospital, aged 92. He married Ivy Kan Shiu-han and was survived by his four sons and one daughter.

Legislative Council of Hong Kong
Preceded by Kwok Chan	Senior Chinese Unofficial Member in Legislative Council; 1962–1965	Succeeded by Kan Yuet-keung
Government offices
Preceded by Kwan Cho-yiu	Senior Chinese Unofficial Member in Executive Council; 1971–1972	Succeeded by Kan Yuet-keung
Business positions
New title	Chairman of the Ocean Park Hong Kong	Succeeded by D. K. Newbigging
