= Four big families of Hong Kong =

Influential business families in Hong Kong

The four big families of Hong Kong (Chinese: 香港四大家族) is a term used to describe the four business families that historically rose to prominence and became influential in Hong Kong. In order of influence, they are the Li, Ho, Lo and Hui families.

The founders of the original four families are Li Sek-peng (李石朋), Robert Ho Tung (何東), Hui Oi-chow (許愛周) and Lo Cheung-shiu (羅長肇). Of these families, the Lis and the Hos and their descendants are the two most recognized by regular Hong Kong citizens today.

== Families ==
The families and their descendants are listed below. Each indentation represents one generation down, though not necessarily the next generation. Not all the descendants are shown. Most members of these families have reached tycoon status.

=== Li family notables ===
- Li Shek-pang (李石朋, 1863–1916) also known as Li Pui-choi (李佩材) – Originally from Guangdong
  - Li Koon-chun (李冠春, 1887–1966) – Founder of Bank of East Asia, Director of Tung Wah Group of Hospitals and Po Leung Kuk
    - Li Fook-shu (李福樹, 1912–95) – Council member of Chinese University of Hong Kong
      - David Li (李國寶, 1939–) – Chairman, Bank of East Asia, Member of LegCo, ExCo, and HK Basic Law Drafting Committee
      - Arthur Li (李國章, 1945–) – Hong Kong Secretary for Education & Manpower (2002–2007), ExCo Member, CPPC Delegate, Council member of the University of Hong Kong
      - Jeanette Chi-duen, Li
      - Jennifer Chi-ping, Li
    - Ronald Li (李福兆, 1929–2014) – Founder & Chairman of Stock Exchange of Hong Kong
  - Li Tse-fong (李子方, 1891–1953)
    - Li Fook-kow (李福逑, 1922–2011) Hong Kong Secretary for Home Affairs (1977–1980)

=== Ho family notables ===
- Robert Ho Tung (何東, 1862–1956) – Businessman, philanthropist
  - Victoria Hotung (何錦姿, 1897–92) ∞ Man-kam Lo
  - Edward Hotung (何世儉, 1902–57)
    - Sir Joseph Hotung (何鴻卿, 1930–2021)
    - Eric Hotung (何鴻章, 1926–2017)
  - Robert Hotung (何世禮, 1906–98)
  - George Ho (何佐芝, 1918–2014) – Founder of the Commercial Radio Hong Kong
    - George Joseph Ho (何驥 1950–) – Chairman of the Commercial Radio Hong Kong
- Ho Fook (何福, 1863–1926) – Businessman, philanthropist
  - Ho Sai-wing – comprador, Hong Kong & Shanghai Bank
  - Ho Sai-iu (何世耀)
    - John Ho (何鴻超, 1916–2005) – Hon. Clinical Professor in clinical oncology, HKU
  - Ho Sai-kwong (何世光)
    - Stanley Ho (何鴻燊, 1921–2020) – Head of Macau casinos
      - Pansy Ho (何超瓊, 1962–) – Group Executive Chairman and Managing Director of Shun Tak Holdings
      - Daisy Ho (何超鳳, 1964–) – Current Head of Macau casinos as the chairman and executive director of SJM Holdings
      - Josie Ho (何超儀, 1974–) – Singer and actress
      - Lawrence Ho (何猷龍, 1976–) – Chief exec of Melco International development
  - Ho Sai-chuen (何世全, 1891–1938) – Doctor and member of the Sanitary Board
  - Ho Sai-ki (何世奇)
    - Algernon Ho (kia 1941)
    - Ronald Ho
    - Pamela Ho
      - Sandra Hunt
      - Sheila Hunt
    - Cecelia Ho
      - Stanley John Greaves
    - Eric Peter Ho (何鴻鑾, 1927–2015) – Hong Kong government official
      - Victor Ho
      - Doris Ho
      - David Ho
- Ho Kom-tong (何甘棠, 1866–1950) – Businessman, philanthropist
  - Grace Ho (何愛瑜) ∞ Lee Hoi-chuen
    - Bruce Lee (李小龍, 1940–73) – Movie star and martial artist
      - Brandon Lee (李國豪, 1965–93) – Actor and martial artist

=== Hui family notables ===
- Hui Oi-chow (許愛周, 1881–1966) – Businessman
  - Hui Kei-pak (許歧伯)
    - Victor Hui (許晉奎) – Chairman of Hong Kong Football Association, vice-president of Sports Federation and Olympic Committee of Hong Kong, China
    - Charles Hui (許晉平)
  - Stephen Hui (許士芬, 1912–1989)
    - Sylvia Hui (許雪禮)
    - Richard Hui (許晉義)
    - William Hui (許晉廉)
      - John Hui (許建業)
        - Bryan Hui
        - Nicola Hui
        - Alex Hui
  - Hui Sai-fun (許世勳, 1921–2018)
    - Jenkin Hui (許晉乾, 1939–2014)
      - Jonathan Hui (許建德)
    - Hui Suet Yuen (許雪元)
    - Julian Hui (許晉亨, 1962–) ∞ (1) Pansy Ho ∞ (2) Michelle Reis
      - Jayden Max Hui (2011–)

=== Lo family notables ===
- Lo Cheung-shiu (羅長肇, 1867–1934) – Compradore of Jardine, Matheson & Co.
  - Lo Man-kam (羅文錦, 1893–1959) – Solicitor, founder of Lo and Lo law firm, member of the Executive and Legislative Councils of Hong Kong, married to Victoria Hotung, daughter of Robert Ho Tung
    - Lo Tak-shing (羅德丞, 1935–2006) – Solicitor, member of the Hong Kong Basic Law Drafting Committee, CPPCC Executive and Legislative Councils of Hong Kong
  - Lo Man-wai (羅文惠, 1895–1985) – Solicitor and member of the Executive and Legislative Councils.
    - Kenneth Lo Tak-cheung (羅德璋, 1920–2007) – Lawyer, member of the Legislative and Urban Councils.
  - Enid Lo (羅德貞) – Hong Kong Tennis Champion, married to John L. Litton
    - Henry Litton (列顯倫, 1934–) – Non-Permanent Judge of the Court of Final Appeal
      - John Litton QC (烈宗仁) – Barrister, Hong Kong Bar (1990– ), English Bar (1991– )
  - Doris Lo (羅巧貞) – married to Ho Sai-ki, son of Ho Fook
    - Eric Peter Ho (何鴻鑾, 1927–2015) – Hong Kong government official

== Other definitions ==
Victor Wan-tai Zheng, co-author of Grand Old Man of Hong Kong: Sir Robert Ho Tung (2007) and Opium King: Lee Hysan (2011), lists 10 "Wealthy Chinese Family Busineses [sic] in Hong Kong" in his PhD thesis: Ho Tung Family, Li Shek-pang Family, Fung Pak-liu Family (note: 馮柏燎, co-founder of Li & Fung), Lee Leung-yick Family (note: father of Lee Hysan), Chau Wing-tai Family, Hui Oi-chow Family, Cheung Chuk-shan Family, Kowk [sic] (Wing On) Family, Fung Ping-shan Family and Tang Chi-ngong Family.

He also lists a number of families, including Wang Lo Kat [sic] (Wong Lo Kat) and Lee Kam Kee [sic] (Lee Kum Kee), in a separate category. The thesis was later modified and published as Chinese Family Business and the Equal Inheritance System: Unravelling the Myth in 2010.

Other authors have suggested new Four big families for the post colonial era. In this case, there are many more variants, including the Li Ka-shing, Kwok Tak-seng, Lee Shau-kee and Cheng Yu-tung families or the Tung Chee-hwa, James Tien, Henry Tang and Rong Yiren families.

Some scholars have gone even further by widening it to include the "big 10 families": Li Ka-shing family, Swire family, Keswick family, Kwok Tak-seng family, Pao Yue-kong family, Kadoorie family, Lee Shau-kee family, Cheng Yu-tung family, Chan Tseng-Hsi family and Ng Teng Fong family.

Most of the latter members have been associated with the term "real estate tycoons" (Chinese: 地產霸權; lit. 'property/real estate hegemony'), a label made popular by Alice Poon's book Land and the Ruling Class in Hong Kong. In her book, she lists the Lis [Ka-shing], the Kwoks [Tak-seng], the Lees [Shau-kee], the Chengs [Yu-tung], the Paos [Yue-kong] and Woos [Peter] and the Kadoories as the powerful Hong Kong families who hold sway over local "property-cum-utility/public services conglomerates". The Chinese translation of the book uses 香港六大家族; 'Hong Kong "big 6" families' as a section title.

As of 2018, Li Ka-shing and Lee Shau-kee were ranked first and second in Forbes' Hong Kong's 50 Richest respectively, while Thomas and Raymond Kwok brothers, sons of the late Kwok Tak-seng, were ranked 4th; their eldest brother, Walter Kwok (d. 20 October 2018), was ranked 10th. Richard Li, the younger son of Li Ka-shing, was ranked 19th. Henry Cheng, son of the late Cheng Yu-tung, was ranked 49th. Some of the members of the aforementioned "new" families were also on the list, such as Peter Woo, son-in-law of the late Pao Yue-kong (6th), Michael Kadoorie (12th), the brothers Tung Chee-hwa and Chee-chen (17th) and Chan Tan Ching-fen, widow of Chan Tseng-His [sic] (35th).

== See also ==
- Five Great Clans of the New Territories
- Kom Tong Hall, a historical building that was owned by Ho Kom-tong
- Four big families of the Republic of China
