= Senior Member =

Senior Member may refer to:

- Senior Member of the Executive Council of Hong Kong
- Senior Member of the Legislative Council of Hong Kong
- Senior Member, a rank in the United States' Civil Air Patrol
- Senior Member of the Association for Computing Machinery (ACM)
- Senior Member of the IEEE
