= Chau Tsun-nin =

Hong Kong businessman and politician

The Honourable Sir Tsun-nin Chau CBE, JP
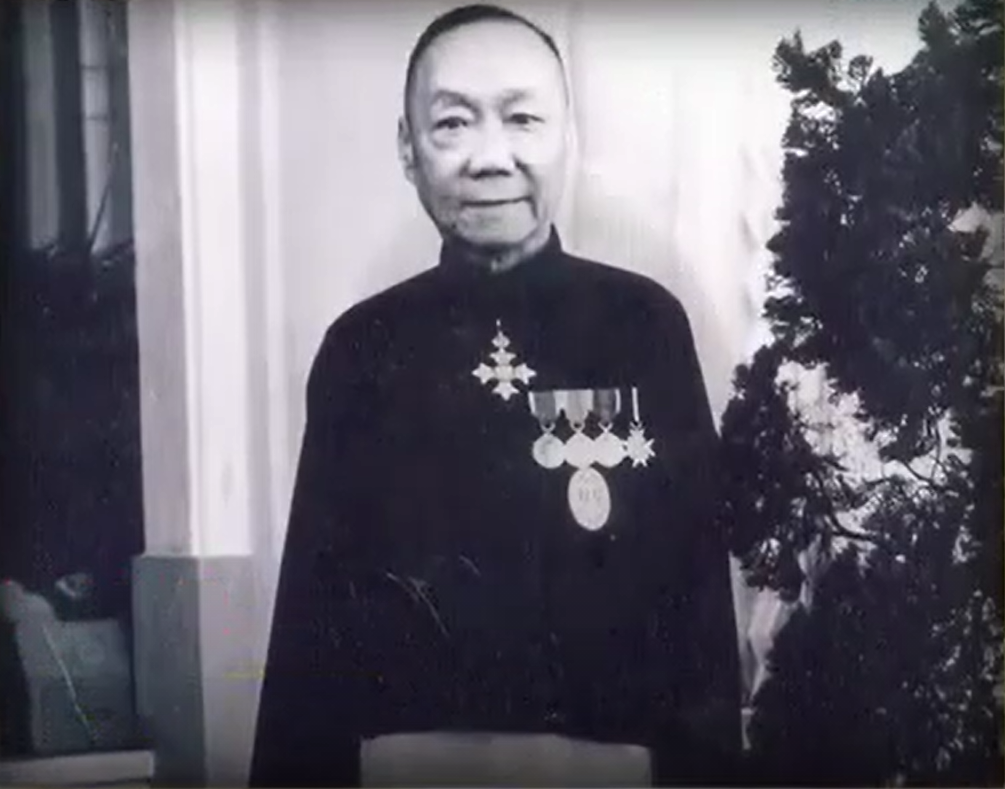

Unofficial Member of the Executive Council of Hong Kong
- In office 29 June 1938 – 1938
- Appointed by: Sir Geoffry Northcote
- Preceded by: Robert Hormus Kotewall
- Succeeded by: Robert Hormus Kotewall
- In office 1946 – 28 May 1959
- Appointed by: Sir Mark Young
- Succeeded by: Lo Man-wai

Unofficial Member of the Legislative Council of Hong Kong
- In office 2 December 1931 – 1 December 1939
- Appointed by: Sir William Peel; Thomas Southorn; Sir Geoffry Northcote
- Preceded by: Sir Chow Shou-son
- Succeeded by: W. N. T. Tam
- In office 1 May 1946 – 29 April 1953
- Appointed by: Sir Mark Young

Personal details
- Born: 22 December 1893 British Hong Kong
- Died: 27 January 1971 (aged 77) British Hong Kong
- Resting place: Aberdeen Chinese Cemetery
- Children: Chau Cham-son
- Education: St. Stephen's College, Hong Kong; Queen's College, Oxford
- Occupation: Businessman and politician
- Profession: Barrister

Chau Tsun-nin
- Traditional Chinese: 周埈年
Transcriptions
Yue: Cantonese
- Yale Romanization: Jāu, Jeun-nìhn
- Jyutping: Zau^{1}, Zeon^{3} nin^{4}

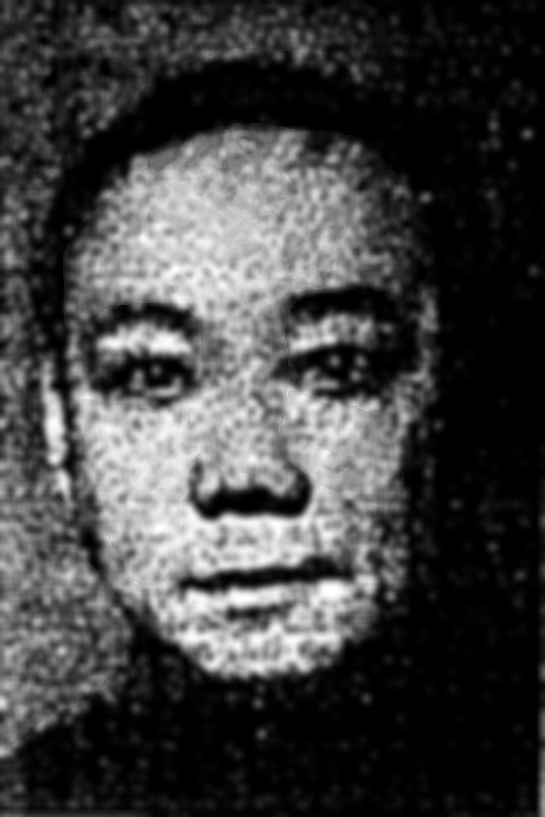
Chau in c. 1939

Sir Tsun-nin Chau, CBE (Chinese: 周埈年; 22 December 1893 – 27 January 1971) was a prominent Hong Kong businessman and politician.

He graduated from St Stephens College at 17 and continued his education at Oxford University as a barrister.

== Public Service ==
He was a member of the Legislative Council since 1931 and a member of the Sanitary Board. He was appointed Justice of the Peace since 1923.

== Honours ==
He was designated a Commander of the Most Excellent Order of the British Empire in 1938 and was knighted in 1956. He is also an Associate Officer of the Venerable Order of the Hospital of St. John of Jerusalem.

Legislative Council of Hong Kong
Preceded by Chow Shou-son	Chinese Unofficial Member; 1931–1939	Succeeded by W. N. T. Tam
Preceded by Ts'o Seen-wan	Senior Chinese Unofficial Member; 1937–1939	Succeeded by Lo Man-kam
Vacant Japanese occupation of Hong Kong	Senior Chinese Unofficial Member; 1946–1953	Succeeded by Chau Sik-nin
Preceded by D. F. Landale	Senior Unofficial Member; 1950–1953	Succeeded by Chau Sik-nin
Political offices
Preceded by Japanese occupation of Hong Kong	Chinese Unofficial Member of the Executive Council of Hong Kong; 1946–1959; With: Lo Man-kam, 1946–59; Ngan Shing-kwan, 1959	Succeeded by Lo Man-wai
Preceded by Japanese occupation of Hong Kong	Senior Chinese Unofficial Member of the Executive Council of Hong Kong; 1946–1959	Succeeded by Chau Sik-nin
Preceded by Arthur Morse	Senior Unofficial Member of the Executive Council of Hong Kong; 1953–1959	Succeeded by Chau Sik-nin
