= St Stephen's College (Hong Kong) =

Secondary school in Hong Kong

St. Stephen's College
- 聖士提反書院

Location
- 22 Tung Tau Wan Road; Stanley; Hong Kong; 22°12′57″N 114°12′57″E

Information
- Type: DSS secondary school
- Motto: Latin: Fortitudinis Fundamentum Fides (Faith is the Foundation of Fortitude)
- Religious affiliation: Anglican
- Established: 1903; 123 years ago
- Founders: Kai Ho; Ts'o Seen Wan; Joseph Charles Hoare; William Banister
- President: Frederick Leung
- Principal: Julie M. W. Ma
- Staff: 146
- Grades: Grade 7 to Grade 12
- Gender: Co-educational
- Enrollment: 914 students in 30 classes (34 groups), 301 borders (Academic year 2014-2015)
- Language: English, Cantonese Chinese, Mandarin Chinese
- Campus size: c. 15 hectares (37 acres)
- Houses: Barnett; College; Hewitt; Martin; Priestley; Stewart
- Publication: Chimes
- Website: www.ssc.edu.hk

Chinese name
- Traditional Chinese: 聖士提反書院
- Simplified Chinese: 圣士提反书院
Transcriptions
Standard Mandarin
- Hanyu Pinyin: Shèng Shìtífǎn Shūyuàn
Yue: Cantonese
- Jyutping: sing3 si6 tai4 faan2 syu1 jyun6*2

St. Stephen's College (Chinese: 聖士提反書院) is a Christian Direct Subsidy Scheme co-educational secondary school in Stanley, Hong Kong. With an area of about 150,000 m^{2} (15 hectares), the college is the largest secondary school in Hong Kong, and is one of the very few boarding schools in the territory. St Stephen's College uses English as the medium of instruction except for Chinese-based subjects.

Many buildings in the campus are listed in the list of historic Buildings and Declared Monuments by the Antiquities Advisory Board. It is the first school in the territory having its own Heritage Trail in the school campus. The college's oldest building, the School House, was declared a monument in 2011, being one of the few schools in Hong Kong to own a Declared Monument in its campus.

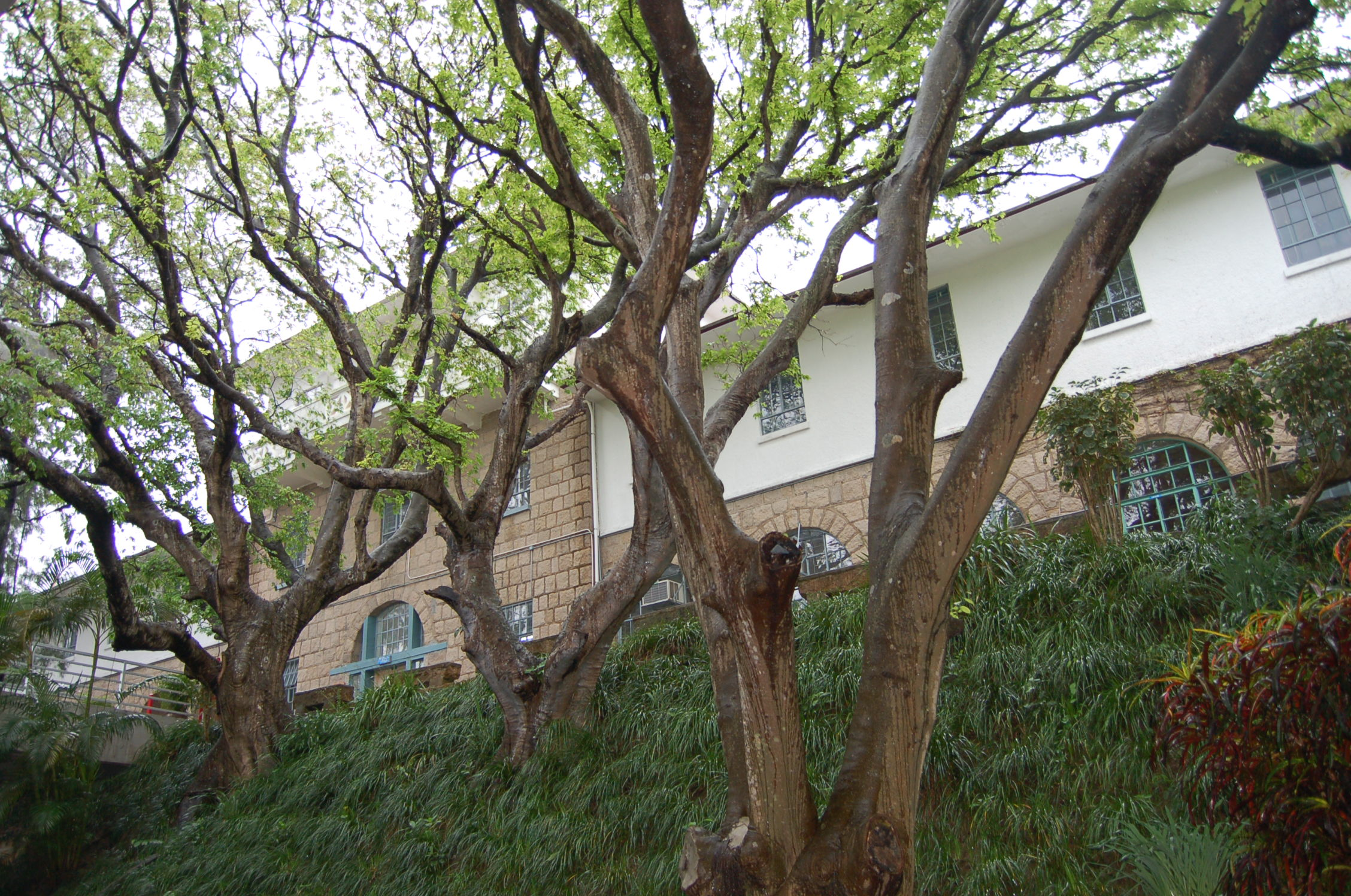
East Wing Building, built in 1929

== History ==
The establishment of the college dates back to 1901. A group of prominent Chinese businessmen approached the Church Missionary Society to administer a school for their sons. The inspiration came from Sun Yat-sen. The aim was to achieve a standard of teaching and level of equipment comparable to the best public schools in England. In 1903, St Stephen's College was officially established on Bonham Road in Western District. In the 1920s, the government granted the school 37 acres (150,000 m^{2}) on the Stanley Peninsula in recognition of outstanding contributions to education. The foundation stone was laid in April 1928 by the Governor of Hong Kong, Sir Cecil Clementi, and in May 1929, the college was fully functional in its new buildings, many of which are still in use today. During the Battle of Hong Kong in the Second World War, heavy fighting took place around the college, which was among the last British strongholds to surrender to the Imperial Japanese Army. Shortly after the surrender, the Imperial Japanese Army broke into the college (which served as a military hospital during the battle) and murdered wounded soldiers of the Allied forces, in what would be known as the St. Stephen's College massacre. The Japanese later merged the college with part of Stanley Prison to form the Stanley Internment Camp.

The college reopened after the war and a chapel was built in 1950 to remember those who died during the Japanese occupation.

Originally a private school, St Stephen's College became a government-funded public school during the late 1900s. Since the 2008–2009 academic year, the college has become a Direct Subsidy Scheme (DSS) school, which is a historic change to the college as it freed the school from the centralised funding system that currently administers secondary education in Hong Kong. Students enrolled in the 2002 Primary 1 class at St Stephen's College Preparatory School, also based in Stanley, were the first group of students to enter the DSS system. In order to upgrade the school administrative level, this is the first secondary school in Hong Kong to employ a registered professional housing manager on its staff to manage and handle all property and facilities-related issues for and on behalf of the school.

=== School principal ===
- 1903–1914: The Ven E. J. Barnett
- 1914–1915: The Revd. A. D. Stewart
- 1915–1928: The Revd. W. H. Hewitt
- 1928–1953: Canon E. W. L. Martin
- 1956–1958: Mr. C. T. Priestley
- 1958–1965: Mr. J. R. F. Melluish
- 1965–1973: The Revd. R. B. Handforth
- 1973–1974: Ven. W. N. Cheung (Acting)
- 1974–1999: Mr. Luke J. P. Yip (葉敬平先生)
- 1999–2005: Mr. D. R. Too (朱業桐先生)
- 2005–2010: Dr. Louise Y. S. Law (羅懿舒博士)
- 2010–2023: Ms. Carol C. Yang (楊清女士)
- 2023–: Mrs. Julie M. W. Ma (馬李敏慧女士)

== Houses ==
St Stephen's College has a house system and divides its students into six houses with different colors. Some names of the houses came from the names of the first few principals of the college:

- Barnett House (Orange) - The Ven. E. J. Barnett;
- Stewart House (Purple) - The Revd. A. D. Stewart;
- Hewitt House (Red) - The Revd. W. H. Hewitt;
- Martin House (Blue/White) - Canon E. W. L. Martin;
- Priestley House (Green) - Mr. C. T. Priestley;
- College House (Yellow)

== Curriculum ==
Before the 2009–2010 academic year, as a local school in Hong Kong, the college had been providing three years of junior secondary, two years of senior secondary and two years of matriculation education under the English 3223 education system.

After the educational system reform was launched by the government, the college has started providing three years of senior secondary education from Form 4 since the 2009–2010 academic year under the New Senior Secondary 334 Scheme. Meanwhile, the International Baccalaureate Diploma Programme (IBDP) had also commenced in the academic year of 2014–2015. The IBDP is a two-year curriculum and is monitored under the International Baccalaureate Organization rather than the Education Bureau of Hong Kong. Since IBDP is two years long, the college will provide a one-year IBDP bridging course to help student adapt to the essay and discussion emphasized IBDP education mode.

== Publications ==
- Official School Magazine
  - Chimes (鐘聲) (Biennially or triennially published since 1909) (Published in years ending in 2, 4, 7 and 9)
- Student Magazine
  - E (biannually published since 2016)
- Parent-Teacher Association
  - Newsletter (會訊) (Triannually published since 1996)
- Students' Association (SA)
  - Choi Choi/Choi Tsz (采茞) (Halted)
  - Stephen's News (提聞) (Quarterly published by SA 2010-2011 (Alpha) in 2010 to 2011)
  - Paper Two Pieces (紙兩張) (Quarterly published by SA 2011-2012 (SOAR) in 2011 to 2012)
  - Echo (回聲) (Semi-annually published by SA 2012-2013 (ECHO) in 2012 to 2013)
- Chinese Society
  - 思藻 (Quarterly published since 2010)
- English Society
  - St Stephen's College Times (Semi-annually published since 2008)
- Mathematics Society
  - Mathematics Challengers Paper (2010 to 2011)
- Music Society
  - MUSO Monthly (2012)

== Preparatory school ==
St. Stephen's College Preparatory School (Chinese: 聖士提反書院附屬小學) is the preparatory primary school of St Stephen's College. St. Stephen's College Preparatory School was founded in 1938 with only one building for classrooms, boarding house and dining hall. During the Second World War, the preparatory school was used for guard quarter by the Japanese. The preparatory school re-opened in 1947, with a new building. Another building of dormitory was built in the 1950s. The preparatory school has started to give boarding places for girls in the 1960s. The preparatory school has 21 classes of more than 600 students.

== Filming of TV shows and movies ==
St Stephen's College was used for filming advertisements, TV shows, movies and MVs.

=== TV shows ===
- Shine On You (TVB Drama, 2004)
- HK ARTchitecture (香港築跡, TVB Documentary, 2010)
- RoadShow Documentary, (保育好風光, 2012)
- Pleasure & Leisure (都市閒情, TVB Show, 2013)
- Hong Kong Stories (香港故事 - 百年樹人, Episode 24, RTHK Documentary, 2013)

=== Movies ===
- Job Hunter / On Trial (1982)
- Whatever Will Be, Will Be (1995)
- The Miracle Box (2004, 2006)
- Echoes of the Rainbow (Mei Ah Entertainment, 2010)
- Sara (2015)

== Notable alumni ==
=== Politics ===
- Fu Bingchang (傅秉常), Nationalist Chinese and Taiwanese politician.
- Hon. Chee-chen Tung (董建成), SBS, JP - member of the College Council of St Stephen's College, chairman and chief executive of Oriental Overseas International Limited, independent non-executive director of Cathay Pacific; younger brother of the first chief executive of Hong Kong Special Administrative Region, Tung Chee Hwa, GBM who is a member of the National Committee of the Chinese People's Political Consultative Conference and vice-president of Olympic Council of Asia.
- Timothy Fok Tsun-ting (霍震霆), GBS, SBS, JP - former member of the Legislative Council of Hong Kong, member of the International Olympic Committee, chairman of the Sports Federation & Olympic Committee of Hong Kong, China, son to the vice-chairman of the National Committee of the Chinese People's Political Consultative Conference of the China Dr. Henry Fok Ying-tung.
- The Hon. Albert Chan Wai-yip (陳偉業) - member of the Legislative Council of Hong Kong (New Territories West).
- Erica Yuen Mi-ming (袁彌明) - chairlady of People Power, participated in the 2012 Legislative Council Election and gained enough votes for Raymond Chan (Slow Beat), who ranks at the top of the list, for being elected.
- Bhichai Rattakul - former deputy Prime Minister of Thailand.

=== Business ===
- Dr. Raymond Chi'ien Kuo Fung (錢果豐), GBS, CBE, JP - non-executive chairman of MTR, chairman of Hang Seng Bank, director of HSBC, director of The Wharf Ltd., chairman of CDC Corporation, chairman of the college Council of St Stephen's College.
- Peter Woo Kwong-ching (吳光正), GBM, GBS, JP - chairman of Wheelock and Company Limited, chairman of The Wharf Holdings Limited.
- Raymond Chow Man-Wai (鄒文懷), OBE, GBS - founder of Golden Harvest.
- Richard Eng (伍經衡) - founder, shareholder of and teacher at the large-scale tutorial school Beacon College (遵理學校); brother of artiste Christine Ng Wing-mei (伍詠薇).
- Sir Sik-nin Chau (周錫年爵士) CBE, JP - first Chinese doctor of ear, nose and throat in Hong Kong, ex-senior unofficial member of Legislative Council and Executive Council, ex-chairman of Kowloon Motor Bus, ex-chairman of Dairy Farm, ex-chairman of Federation of Hong Kong Industries, ex-chairman of HKTDC; brother of another alumnus Tsun-nin Chau.
- Sir Tsun-nin Chau (周埈年爵士) CBE, JP - former chairman of Canton Trust and Commercial Bank, former unofficial member of the Executive Council of Hong Kong, former unofficial member of the Legislative Council of Hong Kong; brother of another alumnus Sik-nin Chau.

=== Entertainment ===
- Erica Yuen Mi-ming (袁彌明), politician, actress, and presenter
- Sammy Leung (森美), actor and radio presenter
- Ellen Wong (王愛倫) - second runner-up in the 1985 Miss Hong Kong Pageant.
- Brian Tse Lap-man (謝立文), writer
- Henick Chou (周漢寧), actor

=== Sports ===
- Ip Man (葉問) - martial arts Wing Chun master, martial arts teacher of Bruce Lee, attended school in 1917 at the age of 18.
- Kin-yee Wan - track and field sprint athlete who competes internationally for Hong Kong, 6-time record breaker of Hong Kong; wife of another alumnus Kwok-wai Pak.
- Royden Lam - professional dart player in Hong Kong, winner of various international dart cups.

== See also ==
- List of Grade II Historic Buildings in Hong Kong
- List of Schools in Hong Kong
- Education in Hong Kong
- St Stephen's College Massacre
- Stanley Internment Camp
