= 1929 Hong Kong sanitary board election =

- 22 May 1929
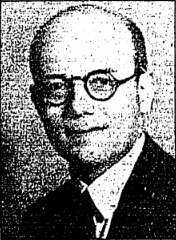
Nominee	Lo Man-kam
Party	Nonpartisan
Popular vote	Uncontested
Member before election
Ho Sai-chuen
Elected Member
Lo Man-kam

The 1929 Hong Kong Sanitary Board election was supposed to be held on 22 May 1929 for one of the two unofficial seats in the Sanitary Board of Hong Kong.

Only ratepayers who were included in the Special and Common Jury Lists of the years or ratepayers who are exempted from serving on Juries on account of their professional avocations, unofficial members of the Executive or Legislative Council, or categories of profession were entitled to vote at the election.

Prominent Chinese lawyer Lo Man-kam was elected uncontested.
