= Lo Cheung-shiu =

Hong Kong businessman

羅長肇 Lo Cheung Shiu
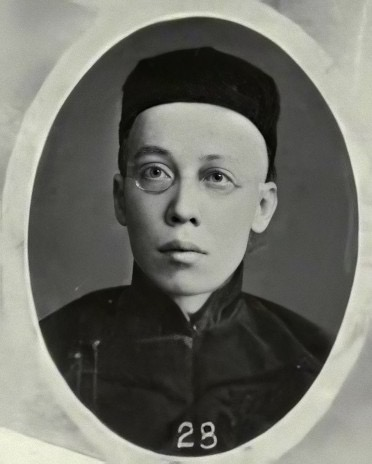
- Born: January 8, 1869; British Hong Kong
- Died: June 30, 1934 (aged 65); British Hong Kong
- Office: Director of Tung Wah Hospital (1915-1916)
- Spouse: Shi Xiangqing (施湘卿)
- Children: four sons, Man-kam, Man-wai, Man-ho, and Man-hin (Horace), and five daughters

Birth name
- Traditional Chinese: 羅長肇
- Simplified Chinese: 罗长肇
Transcriptions
Standard Mandarin
- Hanyu Pinyin: Luó Zhǎngzhào
Yue: Cantonese
- IPA: [tsʰɐn˩ kɔŋ˧˥.sɐŋ˥]

Other names
- Traditional Chinese: 世基
- Simplified Chinese: 世基
Transcriptions
Standard Mandarin
- Hanyu Pinyin: shì jī
Yue: Cantonese
- Jyutping: sai3 gei1

Lo Cheung-shiu (Chinese: 羅長肇; pinyin: luó zhǎng zhào; Jyutping: lo4 coeng4 siu6) (1869–1934) was a prominent Hong Kong businessman and the founder of the Lo family, an influential family in Hong Kong.

== Biography ==
Lo Cheung-shiu was a first generation Hong Kong Eurasian. His father was Thomas Rothwell, an English businessman, and his mother, Zheng You (Chinese: 曾有; pinyin: Zēng Yǒu; Jyutping: Cang4 Jau5), was a Chinese woman.

Lo was a compradore of Jardine, Matheson & Co., formerly one of the leading British mercantile firms in the Far East. He retired in 1920. During his lifetime, Lo held a number of directorships in Hong Kong companies, including China Light and Power Company and the Hong Kong Construction Company.

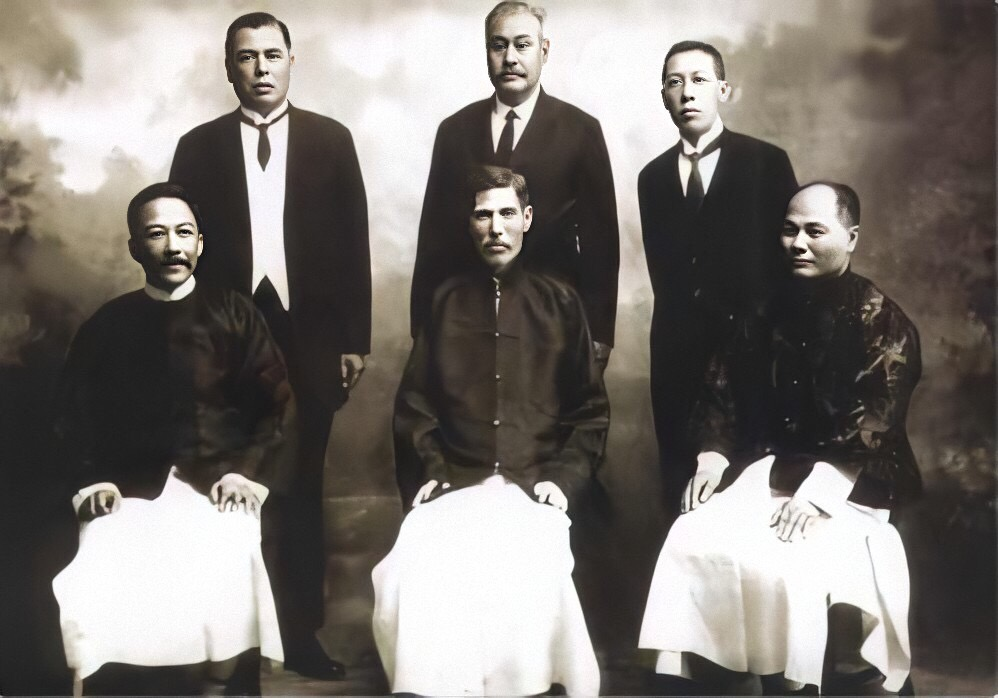
Front row from left: Liu Zhubo, Robert Ho Tung, He Gantang (Ho Tung's half brother). From the left in the back row: Ho Fook, Chen Qiming and Lo Cheung-shiu.

Lo was a wealthy businessman in the early days of Hong Kong's port opening. He and Ho Tung were close friends. Ho Tung introduced Ren Yihe to the comprador in early years. In 1914, he founded Dayou Bank with Liu Zhubo, He Dong, He Fu, He Gantang and Chen Qiming. This is the second bank set up by Chinese in Hong Kong after the Guangdong Bank.

He served on the boards of various local charities. In 1915, he became a director of the Tung Wah Hospital, then the leading Chinese charity in the colony, and later became emeritus advisor to the hospital and permanent board member of Po Leung Kuk. He also served as vice-chairman of the Chinese General Chamber of Commerce and was on its executive committee for many years.

He was made a Justice of the Peace and a member of the District Watch Committee. In 1930, he was awarded a Certificate of Honour on the occasion of King George V's birthday.

On 20 June 1934, after a lengthy illness, he died at 12:30 a.m. at his residence on Conduit Road, Mid-Levels, aged 67. He left an estate worth a reported 543,600 dollars. His funeral took place on 3 July and was attended by many local leaders. The flag of Jardine, Matheson & Co. was hoisted at half mast.

== Family ==
In his early years, his mother was friends with the mothers of He Dong, Ho Fook, Wong Kam Fuk, Sin Tak Fan (Stephen Hall), and Mai Xiuying. His older sister, Luo Ruicai (Luo Xucai), married Ho Fook, and he became friends with Ho Tung. Four of his children went on to marry with members of the Robert Ho Tung family.

Lo's wife, Shi Xiangqing, was the older sister of Andrew Zimmern (She Ping Kwong), who was a partner of the Qing mission in North Korea.

Lo had four sons, Man-kam, Man-wai, Man-ho, and Man-hin (Horace), and five daughters.

Four of his sons went into law and founded Lo and Lo, a well known solicitors firm that remains active today. Man-kam and Man-wai entered politics and became members of the Executive Council and Legislative Council of Hong Kong.

Lo Cheung-shiu's grandson, Lo Tak-shing, also served on the Executive and Legislative Councils and was appointed to the Chinese People's Political Consultative Conference and Hong Kong Basic Law Drafting Committee. He ran as a candidate in elections for the first Hong Kong Chief Executive in 1997.

== See also ==
- Four big families of Hong Kong
