= Kenneth Lo Tak-cheung =

Lawyer and Polititian

Kenneth Tak-cheung Lo, OBE, JP (Chinese: 羅德璋; 13 October 1922 – 23 July 2007) was a Hong Kong lawyer and politician. He was an unofficial member of the Legislative Council of Hong Kong.

Lo was born to a prominent Eurasian merchant and lawyer family on 13 October 1922 in Hong Kong. His father, Man-wai Lo was an unofficial member of the Executive Council and Legislative Council. He was educated at the Queen's College, the University of Hong Kong and the University of Oxford. He returned to Hong Kong joined his uncle, Sir Man-kam Lo's law firm after he obtained law qualifications in England.

He was first appointed member of the Urban Council in 1966 and member of the Housing Authority. From 1973 to 1974, he was an unofficial member of the Legislative Council of Hong Kong. For his public services, he was awarded Officer of the Order of the British Empire (OBE) in 1975.

== See also ==
- Four big families of Hong Kong
