= Senior Chinese Unofficial Member =

Historic Hong Kong government position

- Traditional Chinese: 首席華人非官守議員
Transcriptions
Yue: Cantonese
- Yale Romanization: Sáu jihk wàah yàhn fēi gūn sáu yíh yùhn
- Jyutping: Sau2 zik6 waa4 jan4 fei1 gun1 sau2 ji5 jyun4

Senior Chinese Unofficial Member denotes the highest-ranking ethnically Chinese member of the Legislative Council and Executive Council of Hong Kong under colonial British rule. As Chinese council members were frequently referred to as "Chinese Representatives", the senior member was also known as the "Senior Chinese Representative". In the later years of the colonial rule, many Senior Chinese Unofficial Member also served as Senior Unofficial Member at the same time.

== History ==
In colonial Hong Kong government, an Unofficial Member of a council was a member who was not part of the council by virtue of their government office (i.e. not ex-officio). The first Unofficial Member of the Legislative Council who was ethnically Chinese was Ng Choy, a British-trained barrister who later went on to serve as Foreign Minister and acting Premier of the Republic of China. He was appointed to the Legislative Council in 1880.

The first ethnically Chinese Unofficial Member of the Executive Council was Sir Shouson Chow, a US-educated former Qing dynasty official, who was appointed in 1926.

Over the years, there were 22 ethnically Chinese Unofficial Members of the Legislative Council, and 11 of the Executive Council. Nine of them have served on both councils. The longest tenure was that of Sir Kai Ho, who served 24 years on the Legislative Council. Sir Shouson Chow served 10 years on the Executive Council, the longest on that council. The Senior Unofficial Member served as a leader or representative speaking on behalf of all Unofficial Members, and the Senior Chinese Unofficial Member performed an equivalent role for the ethnically Chinese Unofficial Members.

After the Second World War, the ethnically Chinese members of the two councils gradually increased, and as a result the Senior Unofficial Member was often the Senior Chinese Unofficial Member. From 1974 until the abolition of the colonical councils in 1997, the Senior Unofficial Member was always ethnically Chinese. As a result, the term "Senior Chinese Unofficial Member" gradually disappeared from the 1970s.

== Executive Council ==
Order	Image	Senior Chinese Unofficial Member	Term start	Term end
1		Sir Shouson Chow	1926	1936
2		Robert H. Kotewall later Sir Robert	1936	1941
Japanese occupation of Hong Kong
3		Chau Tsun-nin; Also Senior Unofficial Member in ExCo from 1953 later Sir Tsun-Nin	1946	1959
4		Chau Sik-nin; At the same time Senior Unofficial Member in ExCo later Sir Sik-Nin	1959	1962
5		Richard Charles Lee	1962	1966
6		Kwan Cho-yiu later Sir Cho-Yiu died in office	1966	1971
7		Sir Kenneth Fung Ping-fan	1971	1972
8		Sir Kan Yuet-keung; Also Senior Unofficial Member in ExCo from 1974	1972	1980
9		Sir Chung Sze-yuen; At the same time Senior Unofficial Member in ExCo	1980	1988
10		Lydia Dunn; At the same time Senior Unofficial Member in ExCo later Baroness Dunn	1988	1995
11		Dr. Rosanna Wong Yick-ming; At the same time Senior Unofficial Member in ExCo later Dame Rosanna	1995	1997
1997 -Transfer of sovereignty over Hong Kong to the People's Republic of China

== Legislative Council ==
Order	Image	Senior Chinese Unofficial Member	Term start	Term end
1		Ng Choy	1880	1882
Vacant (1882–84)
2		Wong Shing	1884	1889
3		Dr. Ho Kai later Sir Kai	1890	1914
4		Wei A. Yuk later Sir Boshan	1914	1917
5		Lau Chu-pak died suddenly in office	1917	1922
6		Shouson Chow later Sir Shouson	1922	1931
7		Robert H. Kotewall later Sir Robert	1931	1935
8		Dr. Ts'o Seen Wan	1935	1937
9		Chau Tsun-nin later Sir Tsun-Nin	1937	1939
10		Lo Man-kam later Sir Man-Kam	1939	1941
Japanese occupation of Hong Kong
11		Chau Tsun-nin became the senior unofficial member of LegCo in 1950 later Sir Tsun-Nin	1946	1953
12		Chau Sik-nin At the same time Senior Unofficial Member in LegCo later Sir Sik-Nin	1953	1959
13		Ngan Shing-kwan At the same time Senior Unofficial Member in LegCo	1959	1961
14		Kwok Chan At the same time Senior Unofficial Member in LegCo	1961	1962
15		Kenneth Fung Ping-fan later Sir Kenneth	1962	1965
16		Kwan Cho-yiu later Sir Cho-Yiu	1965	1966
17		Kan Yuet-keung Also Senior Unofficial Member in LegCo from 1968 later Sir Yuet-Keung	1966	1972
18		Woo Pak-chuen At the same time Senior Unofficial Member in LegCo	1972	1974
19		Chung Sze-yuen At the same time Senior Unofficial Member in LegCo later Sir Sze-Yuen	1974	1978
20		Oswald Victor Cheung At the same time Senior Unofficial Member in LegCo later Sir Oswald	1978	1981
21		Dr. Harry Fang Sin-yang later Sir Harry	1981	1985
22		Lydia Dunn At the same time Senior Unofficial Member in LegCo later Baroness Dunn	1985	1988
23		Allen Lee At the same time Senior Unofficial Member in LegCo	1988	1992
Concept abolished in 1992

== See also ==
- Executive Council of Hong Kong
- Legislative Council of Hong Kong
