= Robert Kotewall =

British Hong Kong businessman, civil servant and legislator

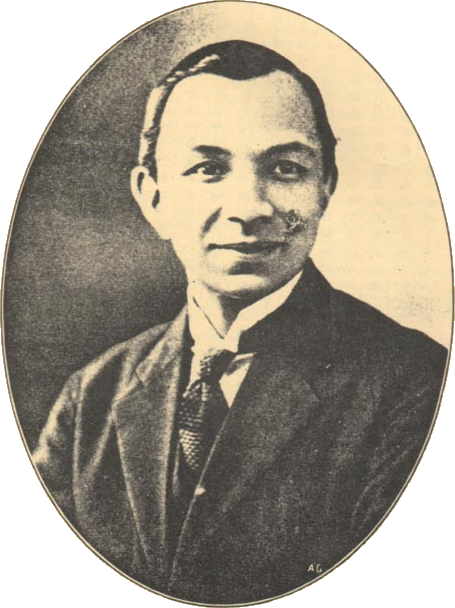
- Robert Kotewall

Senior Unofficial Member of the Executive Council
- In office 1946
- Governor: Cecil Harcourt
- Preceded by: John Johnstone Paterson
- Succeeded by: Arthur Morse

Personal details
- Born: Robert Hormus Kotewall; 1880
- Died: 23 May 1949 (aged 68–69) British Hong Kong
- Spouse: Edith Kotewall (nee Lowcock)
- Occupation: Businessman

Robert Kotewall
- Traditional Chinese: 羅旭龢
Transcriptions
Yue: Cantonese
- Yale Romanization: Lòh, Yūk-wòh
- Jyutping: Lo^{4}, Juk^{1}wo^{4}

Sir Robert Hormus Kotewall CMG (Chinese: 羅旭龢; 1880–1949) was a British Hong Kong businessman, civil servant and legislator.

== Early life ==
Kotewall was born in 1880. He was the son of Hormusjee Rustomjee Kotewall, an Indian Parsi, and Cheung A-cheung. He obtained his early education at the Diocesan Boys School and Queen's College.

== Career ==
In 1913, Kotewall was named Clerk to the Magistracy and JP. By 1919, he was in trade as the manager of the Hong Kong Mercantile Company. In 1923, he was invited to join the Legislative Council as an unofficial member, a position he held until 1935. In 1936, he joined the Executive Council.

During the Japanese occupation of Hong Kong, Kotewall served as the chairman of the Japanese military government's Chinese Representative Council and assisted the Japanese Army in governing Hong Kong. After Sir Mark Young was restored as the governor of Hong Kong, Kotewall submitted a 66-page report explaining the causes and consequences of his actions as a Chinese representative during the Japanese occupation period, but it was not accepted by the British government. Although he was not prosecuted for treason, he was still blacklisted by the Hong Kong government and for the rest of his life would never again be appointed to official positions. At the same time, he was also listed as one of the traitors sought by the Guangdong government of the Republic of China, so he rarely subsequently participated in public life. Kotewall died in 1949.

He was decorated the insignia C.M.G by King George V in 1927.

== Personal life ==
Kotewall's wife was Edith (nee Lowcock) Kotewall (b. 1889). She was the daughter of George Lowcock and granddaughter of Henry Lowcock, an English businessman in Hong Kong. They had 11 children. His great-grandson is actor Max Minghella. His great-granddaughter is former Olympic swimmer Robyn Lamsam Convery, and his grandson is cricketer Roy Lamsam.

=== Legacy ===
Kotewall Road, in Mid-Levels, Hong Kong Island, and Sir Robert Kotewall Hall in the campus of St Paul's Co-educational College, are named after him.

== Gallery ==
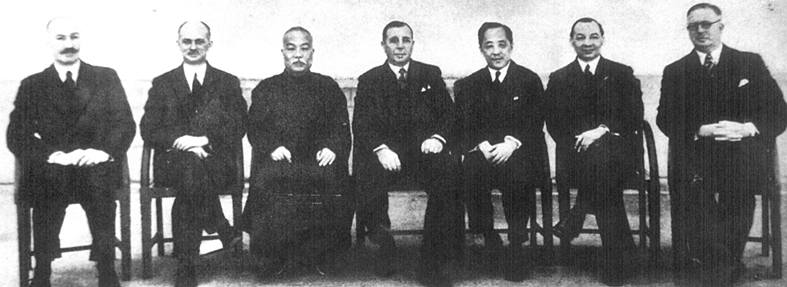
Robert Kotewall (2nd right) as part of the administration of Geoffry Northcote (centre)

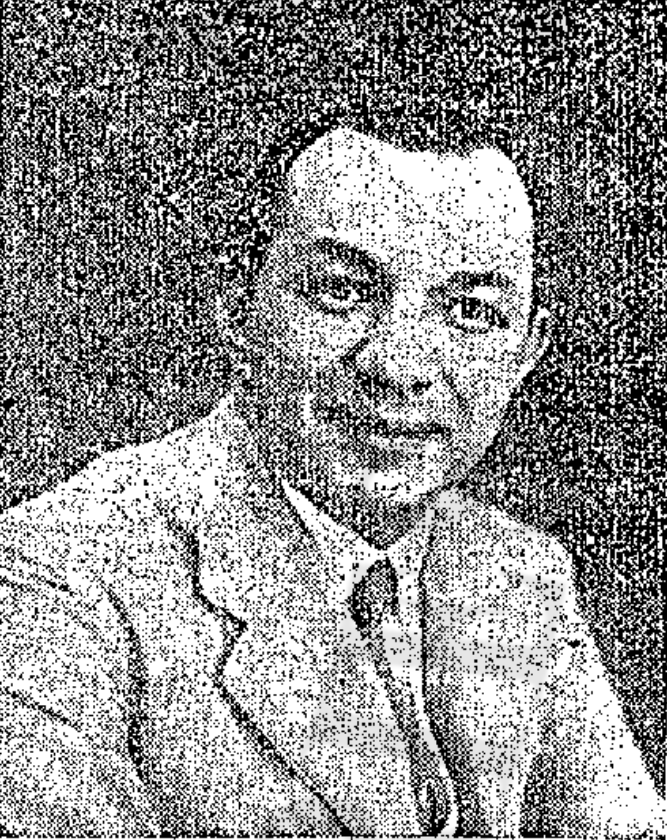
A portrait of Robert Kotewall on a newspaper in 1947

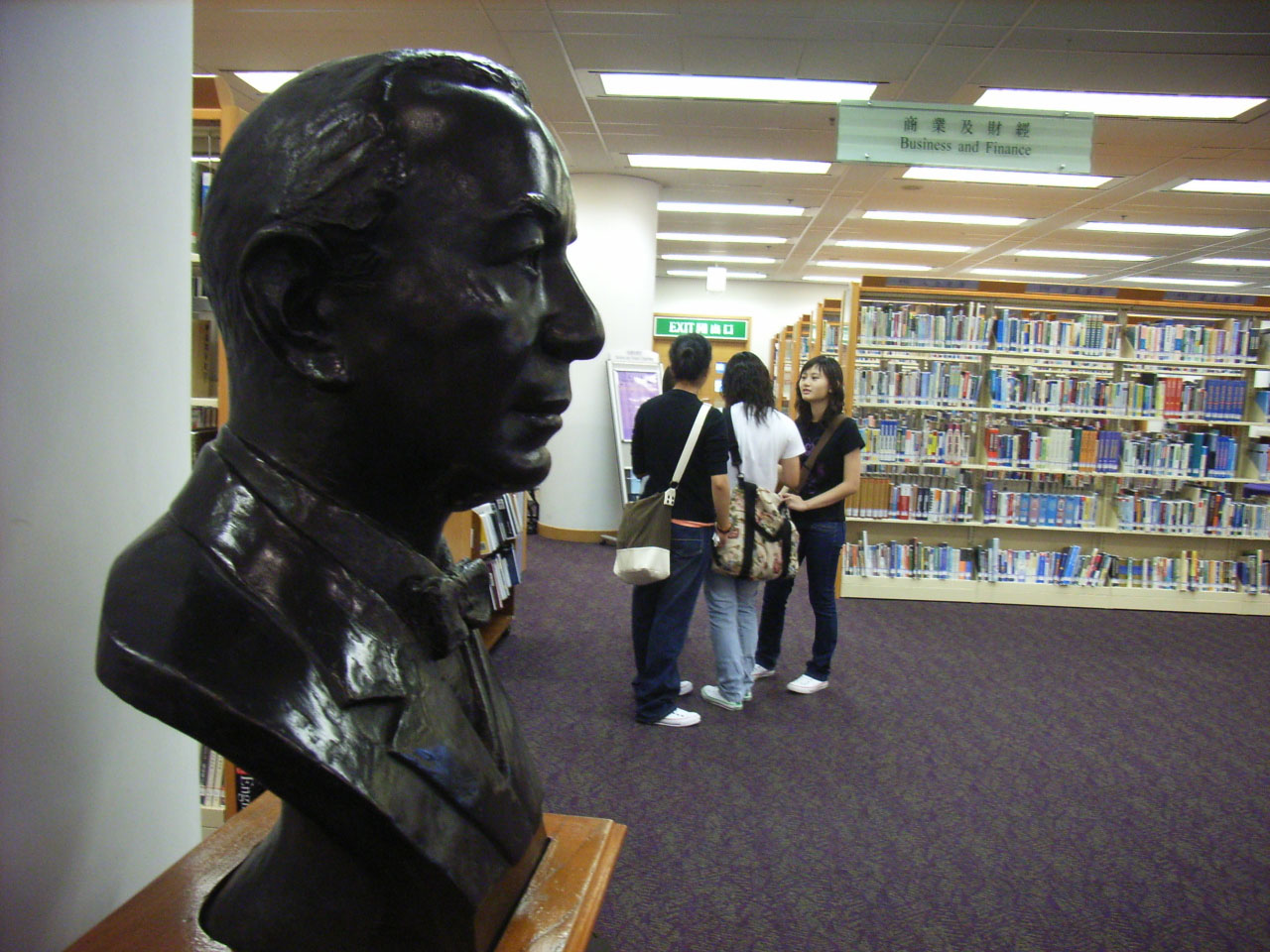
Statue of Robert Kotewall in Hong Kong Central Library

== See also ==
- St. Paul's Co-educational College
- Kotwal, an Indian title

Legislative Council of Hong Kong
| Preceded by Ng Hon-tsz | Chinese Unofficial Member; 1923–1935 | Succeeded by Lo Man-kam |
| Preceded by Chow Shou-son | Senior Chinese Unofficial Member; 1923–1935 | Succeeded by Ts'o Seen-wan |
Political offices
| Preceded by Chow Shou-son | Chinese Unofficial Member of the Executive Council of Hong Kong; 1936–1941 | Japanese occupation of Hong Kong |
