= W. N. T. Tam =

W. N. Thomas Tam OBE, JP
- 譚雅士

Unofficial Member of the Legislative Council of Hong Kong
- In office 3 December 1939 – 25 December 1941
- Appointed by: Sir Geoffry Northcote
- Preceded by: T. N. Chau

Personal details
- Born: 21 July 1900 Hong Kong
- Died: 8 April 1976 (aged 75) Hong Kong
- Spouse: Jessie Pui-chun To
- Education: University of Hong Kong; University College London; Oxford University
- Occupation: Barrister-at-law; Magistrate

William Ngar-tse Thomas Tam, OBE. JP, (Chinese: 譚雅士; 21 July 1900 – 8 April 1976) was a magistrate and member of the Legislative Council in Hong Kong.

== Biography ==
W.N.Thomas Tam ( 譚雅士 ) was born in Hong Kong on 21 July 1900, to a native of Hoi-ping (開平 Kai-ping), named Tam Lung-foo (譚龍虎) alias Tam Bok-choi, who had laboured in California from the age of 16 for nearly 20 years, before relocating to Hong Kong. His mother, Emma Tsang Fook (曾福), was the daughter of a merchant from Po On County.

He was junior to two fostered brothers, and was christened Willie Thomas (譚威利) by his western-orientated father, a Christian, who was to christen all his children with the surname of "Thomas". The only sibling who reverted to the original family name of "Tam 譚" was "Willie", who formalised his name to William Ngar-tse Thomas Tam by Deed Poll in 1926 in the United Kingdom, and there-after was commonly addressed as "Thomas Tam" in English, and as 譚雅士 (Tam Ngar-tse) in Chinese.

Willie attended the Diocesan Boys School (1909-1916), and graduated from the University of Hong Kong (BA 1920). In the same year, he was admitted to the Inner Temple, as well as the University College of the London University to read law (LLB 1923). He was called to the bar by the Honourable Society of the Inner Temple in 1923. He undertook pupillage in Chamber with Mr. F.G. Ennes. Meanwhile, he had enrolled at Lincoln College Oxford in 1921, and was awarded a Diploma in Economics and Political Science in 1922.

While studying in London, he lived at 2 Holford Road in Hampstead, and sought to integrate into British society. Upon returning to Hong Kong in 1926, and for the rest of his life, he was noted for his adoption of English customs, etiquette, dress and language.

In Hong Kong he initially practiced as a barrister. He was extrovert, eloquent and liked socialising.

His many public appointments included being a member of the Legislative Council of Hong Kong, a member of the Urban Council, a director of the Tung Wah Group of Hospitals, a Life Chancellor of Po Leung Kuk, and of many boards of education and charity. He was made a Justice of peace in 1933.

During the war, he declined to accept any post in the Japanese administration, and was subjected to interrogations. He was welcome back by the British administration after the war, and was appointed a magistrate at the Central Magistracy in 1947, heralding a first for an ethnic Chinese. In 1951, he was appointed an Officer of the Order of the British Empire.

He was very active as a Freemason rising to the Grand Rank in the English Craft.

Thomas married Jessie To Pui-chun (杜佩珍 1909-1994) on 2 November 1929 at St. John's Cathedral. Jessie was a daughter of Dr.To Ying-kwan (杜應坤), and a grand-daughter of the famous Dr.To Dao-ming (杜道明) an overseas Chinese missionary doctor of western medicine in Guangzhou in the 1880s, who had fled to Hong Kong, in order to avoid an imperial edict that he should serve the imperial family at the Forbidden City. Her mother, Liao Xiang-nong (廖薌儂), was on close terms with her cousin Liao Zhong-kai (廖仲愷), a revolutionary of the 1920s. Her father was a contemporary and friend of Dr Sun Yat-sen at Hong Kong University.

Between 1931 and 1971, Thomas and Jessie lived at Jessville, a house named after Jessie, built in the wilds of Pokfulam. It was not only their marital home, but also home to their younger orphaned siblings. The household at times totalled more than a dozen people as well as domestic staff. The house had an aura of grandeur on the outside, but was gaunt and frugal on the inside.

Life for Thomas Tam and his family after the war was much more modest, and the income from his job as a magistrate supplemented the education of his children in England in the wake of the instability in Hong Kong as a result of the political upheaval across the border in 1949.

His daughter, Barbara (1931-2006), married Yang Ti-liang (楊鐵樑), who became Chief Justice of Hong Kong. His son, William (1939), was an architect in Britain before relocating to Hong Kong in 1976 to revive family assets.

The Honourable Mr W.N.Thomas Tam, OBE, JP, died after a stroke on 8 April 1976 at the age of 76.

The Jessie and Thomas Tam Charitable Foundation was founded in 1986 by his widow Jessie TO Pui-chun.

*(The above information was up-loaded by William Tam (his son) on 25 August 2020).

== Legacy ==
The Jessie and Thomas Tam Charitable Foundation (established in 1986) has made significant donations to worthwhile causes including HK$5 million to the Hong Kong Cancer Society, £1 million for the 2012 NHS project, "Inflammatory Bowel Disease Registries in the United Kingdom and Hong Kong. A Comparative Study of Disease Pathogenesis in the Far East and West", and through the Jessie and Thomas Tam Charitable Foundation a donation was made to the Oxford University in support of Chinese education at its Faculty of Oriental Studies.

Legislative Council of Hong Kong
Preceded by T. N. Chau	Chinese Unofficial Member; 1939–1941	Vacant Japanese occupation of Hong Kong
