= Chinese Representative Council =

Chinese Representative Council 華民代表會
- Predecessor: Rehabilitation Advisory Committee
- Formation: 30 March 1942
- Dissolved: 15 August 1945
- Location: Japanese Hong Kong
- Chairman: Robert Kotewall

Chinese Representative Council
- Traditional Chinese: 華民代表會
Transcriptions
Yue: Cantonese
- Yale Romanization: Wàah màhn doih bíu wúih
- Jyutping: Waa4 man4 doi6 biu2 wui5

The Chinese Representative Council was a council consisting of leading local Chinese and Eurasian community leaders established by Japan during the Japanese occupation of Hong Kong.

== Background ==
After British Governor of Hong Kong Mark Aitchison Young surrendered to Japan after the Battle of Hong Kong on 25 December 1941, Hong Kong fell under the Japanese military occupation for 3 years and 8 months.

To consolidate their rule, the Japanese military tried to recruit the same local community leaders who had worked for the British. In January 1942, two weeks after the British surrender, Lieutenant General Takashi Sakai invited some 130 leading Chinese and Eurasian leaders to a formal luncheon at the Peninsula Hotel in Kowloon. In the meeting, Saikai stressed that the Chinese and Japanese should work together for the Greater East Asia Co-Prosperity Sphere.

In late January 1942, Lieutenant General Isogai Rensuke became the governor of the occupied territory. He established two councils for managing the local Chinese population, the Chinese Representative Council and Chinese Cooperative Council.

== Composition ==
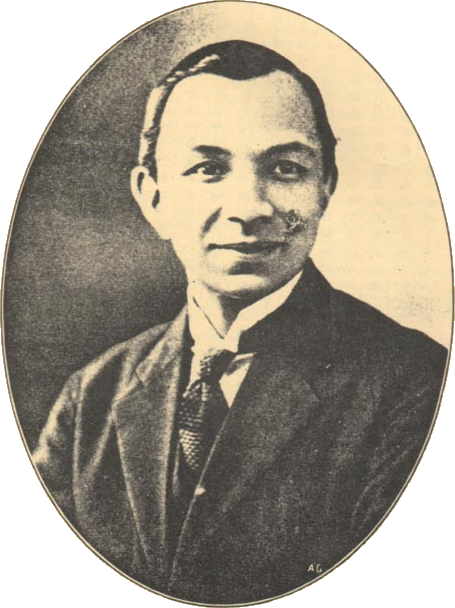
Robert Kotewall

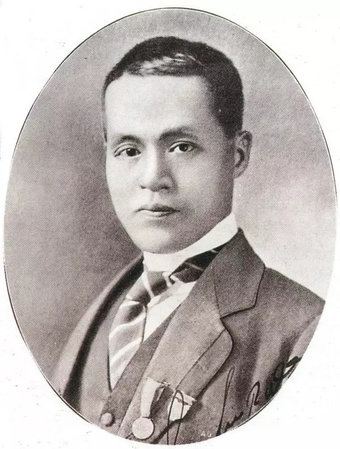
Chan Lim-pak

The Chinese Representative Council and the Chinese Cooperative Council were established on 30 March, replacing the Rehabilitation Advisory Committee (香港善後處理委員會). The Japanese appointed Robert Kotewall, former member of the Executive Council and the Legislative Council in the pre-war period, to be the chairman of the Chinese Representative Council, which consisted of three and from April 1942 four members when Chan Lim-pak was added.

The other members included:

- Chairman: Robert Kotewall (Lo Kuk-wo)
- Lau Tin-shing, manager of the Communications Bank and chairman of the Chinese Bankers' Association
- Li Tse-fong, manager of the Bank of East Asia and former unofficial member of the Legislative Council
- Chan Lim-pak, former comprador of the Hongkong and Shanghai Banking Corporation in Canton

The members of the Council included Lau Tin-shing, manager of the Communications Bank and chairman of the Chinese Bankers' Association. Lau was the president of the Chinese-Japanese Returned-Students Associations and was very pro-Japanese. When he died in April 1945, he was honoured by the Japanese governor. Chan Lim-pak, former comprador of the Hongkong and Shanghai Banking Corporation in Canton, had been arrested by the British during the Japanese invasion on charges of defeatist talk and aiding the enemy. However, the other leaders collaborated with the Japanese mostly with reluctance and misgiving as a matter of physical survival.

The Chinese Representative Council also selected 22 members from the leading professionals to the Chinese Cooperative Council.

== History ==
The Chinese Representative Council met daily to discuss issues but was not entrusted with any real power. All the council could do was to make suggestions and try to persuade the government to accept it. It was also responsible for raising the East Asia Construction Fund for the relief of the starving.

In November 1942, Chan Lim-pak announced on behalf of the council that the Japanese were considering allowing a business syndicate to run a "pleasure resort" centre, which meant brothels, in Shamshuipo.

In January 1943, Chan Lim-pak, Lau Tin-shing and Robert Kotewall made explicit public statements in support of the declaration of war against the United States and the United Kingdom by the Reorganized National Government of China, the puppet regime presided over by Wang Jingwei.

By 1944, when the Japanese was losing the war, the local leaders began to avoid their duties on the council. Kotewall and Li Tse-fong also withdrew from public life for health reasons.

== Aftermath ==
After the surrender of Japan, Robert Kotewell, chairman of the Chinese Representative Council testified in the war crimes trials. Although he was not seen as a traitor, as he was advised by three of the senior members of the Hong Kong British government, R. A. C. North, Grenville Alabaster and J. A. Fraser to cooperate with the Japanese to the extent that the interest of the local Chinese might be safeguarded before the occupation, Kotewell and Li Tse-fong, who held many posts before the war including the Legislative Council never won reappointment of any public positions after the war.
