= Shouson Chow =

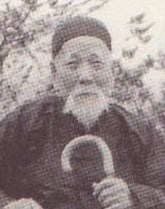
- Sir Shouson in 1952

Unofficial Member of the Executive Council
- In office 9 July 1926 – 8 July 1936
- Appointed by: Sir Cecil Clementi; Sir William Peel
- Preceded by: Paul Chater
- Succeeded by: Robert Kotewall

Senior Chinese Unofficial Member
- In office 1922–1931
- Preceded by: Lau Chu-pak
- Succeeded by: Robert Kotewall

Personal details
- Born: 13 March 1861 Wong Chuk Hang, Hong Kong Island, British Hong Kong
- Died: 23 January 1959 (aged 97)
- Education: Queen's College, Hong Kong; Winsted Local Grammar School

Shouson Chow
- Traditional Chinese: 周壽臣
- Simplified Chinese: 周寿臣
Transcriptions
Standard Mandarin
- Hanyu Pinyin: Zhōu Shòuchén
Yue: Cantonese
- Jyutping: zau1 sau6 san4

Chow Cheong-Ling
- Traditional Chinese: 周長齡
- Simplified Chinese: 周长龄
Transcriptions
Standard Mandarin
- Hanyu Pinyin: Zhōu Chánglíng
Yue: Cantonese
- Jyutping: zau1 coeng4 ling4

Sir Shouson Chow (Chinese: 周壽臣; pinyin: Zhōu Shòuchén; 1861–1959), also known as Chow Cheong-Ling (Chinese: 周長齡; pinyin: Zhōu Chánglíng), was a Hong Kong businessman and politician. He had been a Qing dynasty official and prominent in the Government of Hong Kong.

== Family ==
Chow is said to have been born in Wong Chuk Hang San Wai, a village at the foot of present-day Shouson Hill. Wong Chuk Hang San Wai was a village of a Chow lineage.

His father was compradore of the Canton-based Canton and Hong Kong Steamship Company. His grandfather was the head of "Little Hong Kong", who helped Charles Elliot post the first official proclamation of Hong Kong Island in 1841. He had a son, named Chow Yat-Kwong.

== Career ==
Among the third group of Chinese students sponsored by the Qing government to the United States in the 1870s, Chow left China in 1874 and studied at Phillips Academy, Andover (class of 1880)

After his graduation, he received an offer of admission to Columbia University. However, his studies were cut short in 1881 when the Qing government terminated the Mission, ordering all students back to China. Upon his return that year, he joined the Korean Customs Service under Yuan Shikai. Later, he became president of the China Merchant Steam Navigation Company in Tianjin from 1897 to 1903, and the managing director of the Peking-Mukden Railway between 1903 and 1907.

From 1907 to 1910, he was the Customs and Trade Superintendent and Counselor for Foreign Affairs in Niuzhuang. During this period, he was promoted to Mandarin of the Second Rank. He left government service after the 1911 Revolution and settled in Hong Kong, becoming director of various companies and charities.

== Public Service ==
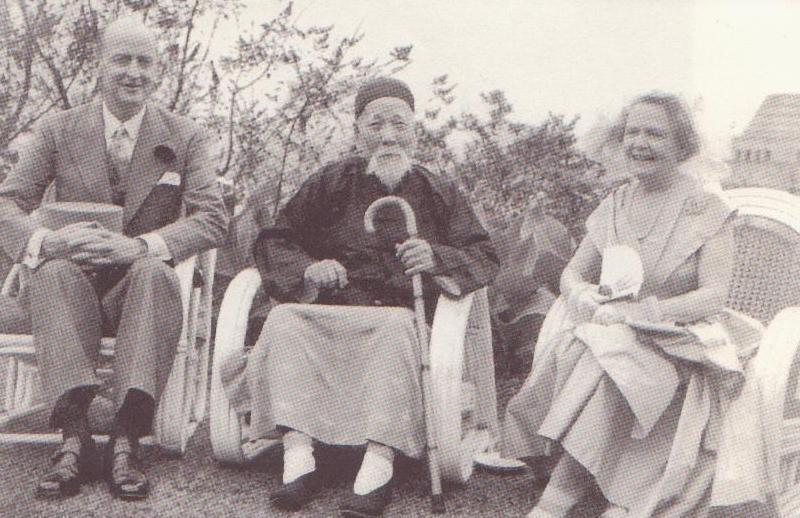
Sir Shouson with Sir Alexander Grantham, the Governor of Hong Kong, in 1952

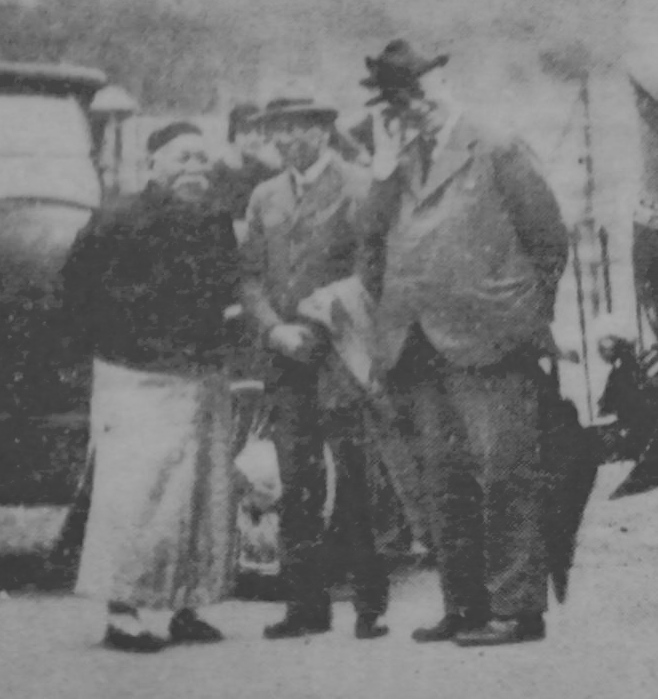
Chow with Justice John Wood and Henry Gollan CJ in 1929 at the funeral of Mr H.P. White

Chow was appointed a Justice of the Peace in Hong Kong in 1907. He was subsequently elected to membership of the North British Academy of Arts.

In 1918, he founded the Bank of East Asia with three Chinese partners where he was the chairman of the board from 1925 to 1929. In 1922 he was appointed a member of the Sanitary Board, the precursor of the Urban Council, and the Legislative Council, where he served until 1931.

In 1926, he became the first Chinese member of the Executive Council, and was knighted. In 1933, he was awarded an honorary Doctorate of Laws.

During the Japanese occupation of Hong Kong, Chow and other leading Chinese figures joined the Chinese Cooperative Council founded by the Japanese military which he was the chairman to maintain public order among the Chinese population. They did not suffer punishment for this collaboration after the return of British rule.

He was publicly and privately connected with various branches of philanthropic activities. He was the President of the Hong Kong Society of the Protection of Children and Patron of the Chinese Mission to Lepers, member of the District Watchmen Committee, Permanent Advisor of the Tung Wah Hospital, Public Dispensaries, and the Po Leung Kuk. He was also advisor of the Chinese General Chamber of commerce and Honorary President of the South China Athletic Association and the Chinese Recreation Club.

He was awarded Order of the Chia Ho (Excellent Crop) Third Class by President Yuan Shih-kai. In 1918 he was awarded Second Class of the same Order, and the Second Class Medal of Brilliancy by President Hsu Shih-Chang in 1919. He was knighted in 1926 and awarded the Order of the Silver Jubilee in 1935 by King George V.

== Memory ==
Shouson Hill, in the south of Hong Kong Island, is named after him.

Legislative Council of Hong Kong
Preceded by Ho Fook	Chinese Unofficial Member; 1921–1931	Succeeded by Chau Tsun-nin
Preceded by Lau Chu-pak	Senior Chinese Unofficial Member; 1922–1931	Succeeded by Robert Hormus Kotewall
Political offices
Preceded by Catchick Paul Chater	Unofficial Member of the Executive Council of Hong Kong; 1926–1936	Succeeded by Robert Hormus Kotewall
