= Senior Unofficial Member =

Historic Hong Kong government position

- Traditional Chinese: 首席非官守議員
Transcriptions
Yue: Cantonese
- Yale Romanization: Sáu jihk fēi gūn sáu yíh yùhn
- Jyutping: Sau^{2} zik^{6} fei^{1} gun^{1} sau^{2} ji^{5} jyun^{4}

Senior Member
- Traditional Chinese: 首席議員
Transcriptions
Yue: Cantonese
- Yale Romanization: Sáu jihk yíh yùhn
- Jyutping: Sau^{2} zik^{6} ji^{5} jyun^{4}

Convenor of the Non-official Members
- Traditional Chinese: 非官守議員召集人
Transcriptions
Yue: Cantonese
- Yale Romanization: Fēi gūn sáu yíh yùhn jiuh jaahp yàhn
- Jyutping: Fei^{1} gun^{1} sau^{2} ji^{5} jyun^{4} ziu^{6} zaap^{6} jan^{4}

Senior Chinese Unofficial Member
- Traditional Chinese: 首席華人非官守議員
Transcriptions
Yue: Cantonese
- Yale Romanization: Sáu jihk wàh yàhn fēi gūn sáu yíh yùhn
- Jyutping: Sau^{2} zik^{6} waa^{4} jan^{4} fei^{1} gun^{1} sau^{2} ji^{5} jyun^{4}

The Senior Unofficial Member, later Senior Member and, finally, Convenor of the Non-official Members, was the highest-ranking unofficial member of the Legislative Council (LegCo) and Executive Council (ExCo) of British Hong Kong, which was tasked with representing the opinions of all unofficial members of the council to the Governor.

Ethnic Chinese members of either council were frequently referred to as "Chinese representatives" of the council before the introduction of elected seats in the LegCo; the most senior ethnic Chinese member was dubbed the "Senior Chinese Unofficial Member" (Chinese: 首席華人非官守議員) or "Senior Chinese Representative".

== Background ==
The Executive Council and the Legislative Council were set up in 1843, initially composing of colonial administrators only. The councils were initially chaired by the Governor of Hong Kong. The colony's residents remained unrepresented until 1850, when the government appointed two businessmen to the LegCo, with David Jardine of Jardines as the first Senior Unofficial Member of the LegCo in the history of Hong Kong. It was not until 1896, on his appointment to ExCo, that Catchick Paul Chater became the Senior Unofficial Member.

Historically, ExCo Senior Unofficial Member importance greatly exceeded that of the LegCo counterpart, thus their term of office were longer. Before the Second World War, there were only three Senior Unofficial Members in ExCo, whereas there have been four LegCo Senior Unofficial Members. Initially, membership was restricted to Europeans; ethnic Chinese were admitted at a later date. The first ethnic Chinese to be appointed LegCo Senior Unofficial Member was Ho Kai, who held the post from 1906 to 1914. The first ethnic Chinese to be appointed ExCo Senior Unofficial Member was Chau Tsun-nin, who held the post from 1953 to 1959. Prior to Chau Tsun-nin, Chow Shouson was also ExCo Senior Unofficial Member when he stood in for three months following Henry Pollock.

Senior Unofficial Members of the ExCo would customarily be knighted if they were not already knights, although their LegCo counterparts would not. Pre-WWII ExCo and LegCo Senior Unofficial Member typically served renewable four- to five-year terms. Their seniority implied they would not remain as ordinary Legco/Exco members at the end of their terms, but would leave the council on expiry.

In 1985, indirect elections were introduced for the Legislative Council. To avoid confusion, Sir Edward Youde, the then-Governor, renamed the post Senior Unofficial Member in both councils "Senior Member". The introduction in 1991 of direct elections to the LegCo more than doubled the number of its members. The directly elected members refused to take orders from the Senior Member. The Senior Member at the time, Allen Lee, was unable to represent the council with a single voice and would occasionally have run-ins with the directly elected members. In 1992, Governor David Wilson abolished the LegCo post of Senior Member. In 1995, Governor Chris Patten renamed the ExCo post of Senior Member "Convenor of the Non-official Members".

During colonial times, the Urban Council also had a post entitled "Senior Unofficial Member", with a similar role. However, its importance was considerably less than its ExCo and LegCo counterparts.

== Statistical overview ==
In total there have been 26 and 11 Senior Unofficial Members respectively of LegCo and ExCo. Of these, six have served as Senior Unofficial Members in both councils: Catchick Paul Chater, Sir Henry Pollock, Chau Tsun-nin, Kan Yuet-keung, Chung Sze-yuen and Lydia Dunn.

The longest serving Senior Unofficial Members of LegCo were Sir Henry Pollock and Phineas Ryrie, who sat for 24 and 22 years respectively; the three who served the shortest duration were George Lyall, John Dent and Kwok Chan, who sat for one year. Lydia Dunn was the only female; Dhun Jehangir Ruttonjee was the only Parsee; Roger Lobo was the only Portuguese.

The longest serving Senior Unofficial Members of ExCo was Catchick Paul Chater, who served a total of 30 years; the shortest tenures was Sir Sidney Gordon, serving under one year. Lydia Dunn was the first female ExCo Senior Unofficial Member. Chater was the only Senior Unofficial Member to die in office; Chau Tsun-nin and Chau Sik-nin were the only Senior Unofficial Members drawn from the same clan.

== Executive Council ==
| No. | Portrait | Name | Term | Governor | Remarks |
|---|---|---|---|---|---|
| 1 | | Sir Catchick Paul Chater | 1896–1926 | Sir William Robinson; Sir Henry Arthur Blake; Sir Matthew Nathan; Sir Frederick Lugard; Sir Francis Henry May; Sir Edward Stubbs; Sir Cecil Clementi | Former LegCo Senior Unofficial Member (1900–1906); Died in office |
| 2 | | Sir Henry Pollock | 1926–1941 | Sir Cecil Clementi; Sir William Peel; Sir Andrew Caldecott; Sir Geoffry Northcote; Sir Mark Aitchison Young | Also LegCo Senior Unofficial Member; (Note: Chow Shouson stood in between September and December 1928) |
Japanese occupation of Hong Kong (1941–1945)
| 3 | | Sir Arthur Morse | 1946–1953 | Sir Mark Aitchison Young; Sir Alexander Grantham | |
| 4 | | Sir Tsun-nin Chau | 1953–1959 | Sir Alexander Grantham; Sir Robert Brown Black | Previously LegCo Senior Unofficial Member; First Chinese Senior Unofficial Member |
| 5 | | Sir Sik-nin Chau | 1959−1962 | Sir Robert Brown Black | Previously LegCo Senior Unofficial Member |
| 6 | | Albert Rodrigues | 1962–1974 | Sir Robert Brown Black; Sir David Trench; Sir Murray MacLehose | First Portuguese Senior Unofficial Member |
| 7 | | Sir Yuet-keung Kan | 1974–1980 | Sir Murray MacLehose | Previously LegCo Senior Unofficial Member |
| 8 | | Sir Sidney Gordon | 1980 | Sir Murray MacLehose | Assumed office from March to August 1980 |
| 9 | | Sir Sze-yuen Chung | 1980–1985 | Sir Murray MacLehose; Sir Edward Youde | Previously LegCo Senior Unofficial Member |
Post renamed "Senior Member" in 1985
| 1 | | Sir Sze-yuen Chung | 1985–1988 | Sir Edward Youde; Sir David Wilson | Previously LegCo Senior Unofficial Member |
| 2 | | Dame Lydia Dunn | 1988–1995 | Sir David Wilson; Chris Patten | Previously LegCo Senior Unofficial Member; First female Senior Official Member |
Post renamed "Convenor of the Non-official Members" in 1995
| 1 | | Dame Rosanna Wong | 1995–1997 | Chris Patten | |
Transfer of sovereignty over Hong Kong in 1997 See List of Convenor of the Non-Official Members of the Executive Council of Hong Kong

== Legislative Council ==
| Term | Assembly | Portrait | Name | Constituency | Party | Entered LegCo | |
Senior Unofficial Member
| 1850–1857 | – | | David Jardine | Appointed | Nonpartisan | 1850 | |
| 1857–1860 | – | | Joseph Jardine | Appointed | Nonpartisan | 1857 | |
| 1860–1861 | – | | John Dent | Appointed | Nonpartisan | 1857 | |
| 1861–1864 | – | | Alexander Perceval | Appointed | Nonpartisan | 1860 | |
| 1864–1866 | – | | Francis Chomley | Appointed | Nonpartisan | 1861 | |
| 1866–1867 | – | | James Whittall | Appointed | Nonpartisan | 1864 | |
| 1867–1870 | – | | Hugh Bold Gibb | Appointed | Nonpartisan | 1866 | |
| 1870–1891 | – | | Phineas Ryrie | Appointed | Nonpartisan | 1867 | |
| 1891–1905 | – | | Catchick Paul Chater | Appointed | Nonpartisan | 1886 | (Note: Also ExCo Senior Unofficial Member) |
| 1905–1914 | – | | Ho Kai | Appointed | Nonpartisan | 1890 | |
| 1914–1917 | – | | Wei Yuk | Appointed | Nonpartisan | 1896 | |
| 1917–1940 | – | | Henry Edward Pollock | Appointed | Nonpartisan | 1906 | |
| 1940–1941 | – | | John Johnstone Paterson | Appointed | Nonpartisan | 1930 | |
Japanese occupation of Hong Kong (1941–1945)
| 1946–1950 | – | | David Fortune Landale | Appointed | Nonpartisan | 1946 | |
| 1950–1953 | – | | Chau Tsun-nin | Appointed | Nonpartisan | 1946 | (Note: Later became ExCo Senior Unofficial Member) |
| 1953–1959 | – | | Chau Sik-nin | Appointed | Nonpartisan | 1946 | |
| 1959–1961 | – | | Ngan Shing-kwan | Appointed | Nonpartisan | 1951 | |
| 1961–1962 | – | | Kwok Chan | Appointed | Nonpartisan | 1952 | |
| 1962–1968 | – | | Dhun Jehangir Ruttonjee | Appointed | Nonpartisan | 1953 | |
| 1968–1972 | – | | Kan Yuet-keung | Appointed | Nonpartisan | 1961 | |
| 1972–1974 | – | | Woo Pak-chuen | Appointed | Nonpartisan | 1964 | |
| 1974–1978 | – | | Chung Sze-yuen | Appointed | Nonpartisan | 1965 | |
| 1978–1981 | – | | Oswald Cheung | Appointed | Nonpartisan | 1968 | |
| 1981–1985 | – | | Roger Lobo | Appointed | Nonpartisan | 1972 | |
Senior Member
| 1985–1988 | 1985–88 | | Lydia Dunn | Appointed | Independent | 1976 | |
| 1988–1992 | 1988–91; 1991–95 | | Allen Lee | Appointed | Independent (1978–91) | 1978 | |
| 1988–1992 | 1988–91; 1991–95 | | Allen Lee | Appointed | CRC (1991–93) | 1978 | |
Highest in order of precedence
| 1992–1997 | 1991–95; 1995–97 | | Allen Lee | Appointed (1978–95); New Territories North-east (1995–97) | CRC (1991–93) | 1978 | |
| 1992–1997 | 1991–95; 1995–97 | | Allen Lee | Appointed (1978–95); New Territories North-east (1995–97) | Liberal (1991–98) | 1978 | |
| 1997–1998 | PLC | | Wong Siu-yee | N/A | LDF (1996–97) | 1996 | |
| 1997–1998 | PLC | | Wong Siu-yee | N/A | HKPA (1997–98) | 1996 | |
| 1998–2004 | 1st 2nd | | Kenneth Ting | Industrial (First) | Liberal | 1998 | |
| 2004–2008 | 3rd | | James Tien | Appointed (1988–91); Industrial (First) (1993–95); Commercial (First) (1998–2004); New Territories East (2004–08) | LDF (1988–91) | 1988; Continuous from 1998 | |
| 2004–2008 | 3rd | | James Tien | Appointed (1988–91); Industrial (First) (1993–95); Commercial (First) (1998–2004); New Territories East (2004–08) | BPF (1993) | 1988; Continuous from 1998 | |
| 2004–2008 | 3rd | | James Tien | Appointed (1988–91); Industrial (First) (1993–95); Commercial (First) (1998–2004); New Territories East (2004–08) | Liberal (1993–2008) | 1988; Continuous from 1998 | |
| 2008–2016 | 4th 5th | | Albert Ho | New Territories West (1995–97); New Territories West (1998–2012); District Council (Second) (2012–16) | Democratic | 1995; Continuous from 1998 | |
| 2016–2020 | 6th | | James To | Kowloon West (1991–95); Kowloon South-west (1995–97); Kowloon West (1998–2012); District Council (Second) (2012–20) | UDHK (1991–94) | 1991; Continuous from 1998 | |
| 2016–2020 | 6th | | James To | Kowloon West (1991–95); Kowloon South-west (1995–97); Kowloon West (1998–2012); District Council (Second) (2012–20) | Democratic (1994–2020) | 1991; Continuous from 1998 | |
| 2020–2021 | 6th | | Abraham Shek | Real Estate and Construction | BPA | 2000 | |
| 2022–2025 | 7th | | Tommy Cheung | Catering | Liberal | 2000 | |
| 2026– | 8th | | Starry Lee | Kowloon Central | DAB | 2008 | Also President of the Legislative Council |

== See also ==
- Executive Council of Hong Kong
- Legislative Council of Hong Kong
- Senior Chinese Unofficial Member
- Unofficial Member
- Father of the House
