= Chau Sik-nin =

Hong Kong doctor, politician and businessman

Sir Sik-nin Chau CBE
- 周錫年
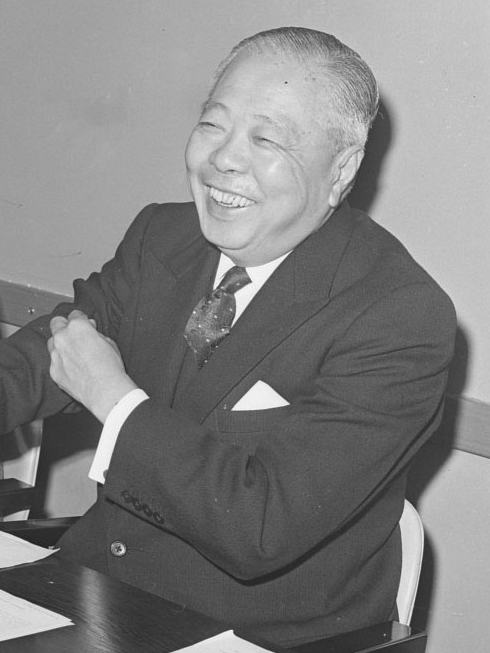

Unofficial Member of the Executive Council of Hong Kong
- In office 1948–1962
- Appointed by: Sir Alexander Grantham; Sir Robert Black

Unofficial Member of the Legislative Council of Hong Kong
- In office 1 May 1946 – 1 July 1959
- Appointed by: Sir Mark Young; Sir Alexander Grantham
- Succeeded by: Dhun Jehangir Ruttonjee

Personal details
- Born: 13 April 1903 Hong Kong
- Died: 30 November 1985 (aged 82) Happy Valley, Hong Kong
- Spouse: Ida Chau
- Children: Chau Kai-bong
- Education: St. Stephen's College; University of Hong Kong
- Occupation: Doctor, lecturer, businessman and politician

Chau Sik-nin
- Traditional Chinese: 周錫年
Transcriptions
Yue: Cantonese
- Yale Romanization: Jāu Sīk-nìhn
- Jyutping: Zau^{1} Sik^{1}-nin^{4}

Sir Sik-nin Chau CBE (Chinese: 周錫年; 13 April 1903 – 30 November 1985) was a Hong Kong doctor, politician and businessman during the first decades after the Second World War. He was the Senior Unofficial Member of the Executive and Legislative Councils of Hong Kong from 1959 to 1962 and from 1953 to 1959 respectively.

== Biography ==
Chau was born in April 1903 in Hong Kong. He was educated at the St. Stephen's College and entered the University of Hong Kong in 1918. After he graduated in medicine in 1924, he went abroad for further study in Vienna and London, where he obtained the Diploma in Ophthalmic Medicine and Surgery and Diploma in Laryngology and Otology. He returned to Hong Kong to practise with those specialist qualifications. He was well-versed in healing eye, ear, and throat.

Chau joined the Department of Surgery at the University of Hong Kong for three years as lecturer in ophthalmology. He was also member of the Interim Committee which operated for the first few months after the British restoration of Hong Kong from the Japanese from 1946 to 1947. He was subsequently appointed by the Chancellor to succeed Sir Man-kam Lo on the University Council in 1956. He was also the vice-president of the Alumni Association of the university. He received the honorary degree of Doctor of Laws by the university in 1961.

Chau became a member of the Urban Council from 1936 to 1941 and served on Government Medical Board and the Board of Education before the war. After the war, he was appointed an unofficial member of the Legislative Council of Hong Kong from 1946 to 1959 and was appointed to the Executive Council in 1948. He was the Senior Unofficial Member of the two councils between 1953 and 1959 and between 1959 and 1962 respectively. Furthermore, he was elected deputy chairman of the Commonwealth Parliamentary Association in Hong Kong from 1953 to 1959. Chau was honoured with the Commander of the Order of the British Empire in 1950 and was knighted in 1960.

In business, he was chairman and director of numerous public companies, including the Dairy Farm. He founded the Hongkong Chinese Bank and became the first chairman. He served as the chairman of the Working Party on the formation of the Federation of Hong Kong Industries in 1960 and was the first chairman of the Federation from 1961 to 1966. He was also founding chairman the Hong Kong Management Association from 1960 and 1969, as well as honorary president of a number of unions or associations of manufacturers. He was appointed the first chairman of the Hong Kong Trade Development Council when it was first established in 1966. In 1967, he established the Sir Sik-nin Chau Foundation for Industrial Development to support the promotion of industrial quality standards, industrial research and surveys and technical education.

Chau served as chairman on some community institutions such as the Hong Kong Settlers Housing Corporation, a builder of low-cost residential cottages and flats, the Hong Kong Model Housing Society, as well as services at the Hong Kong Anti-Tuberculosis Association, the Ruttonjee Sanatorium, and the Grantham Hospital. Chau was the first Chinese steward of the Hong Kong Jockey Club in 1935 and was elected as member of the Board of Stewards in November 1946.

Chau died in Hong Kong Sanatorium and Hospital on 30 November 1985 at the age of 83. His cousin Sir Tsun-nin Chau was also member of the Executive and Legislative Councils. His son Chau Kai-bong was a famous socialite in Hong Kong.

Legislative Council of Hong Kong
Preceded by Japanese occupation of Hong Kong	Unofficial Member; 1946–1959	Succeeded by Dhun Jehangir Ruttonjee
Preceded by Chau Tsun-nin	Senior Chinese Unofficial Member in Legislative Council; 1953–1959	Succeeded by Ngan Shing-kwan
Preceded by Chau Tsun-nin	Senior Unofficial Member in Legislative Council; 1953–1959	Succeeded by Ngan Shing-kwan
Political offices
Preceded by Chau Tsun-nin	Senior Chinese Unofficial Member in Executive Council; 1959–1962	Succeeded by R. C. Lee
Preceded by Chau Tsun-nin	Senior Unofficial Member in Executive Council; 1959–1962	Succeeded by Albert Rodrigues
New title	Chairman of Hong Kong Trade Development Council; 1966–1970	Succeeded by Yuet-keung Kan
Preceded by T. D. Sorby	Chairman of Hong Kong Productivity Council; 1970–1973	Succeeded by Chung Sze-yuen
Business positions
New creation	Chairman of Federation of Hong Kong Industries; 1960–1966	Succeeded by Chung Sze-yuen
