= Hong Kong Society for the Protection of Children =

Charitable Organization

- 香港保護兒童會
- Abbreviation: HKSPC
- Formation: 1926
- Founder: Mr T.M. Hazlerigg
- Legal status: Charity
- President: Mr. Robin Hammond
- Chairman: Mr. Vincent Lee
- Director: Ms. Subrina Chow
- Website: http://www.hkspc.org/

The Hong Kong Society for the Protection of Children (HKSPC) is a registered charity and service provider in Hong Kong. It is governed by an Executive Committee, partially administered by the government and supported by a Fund Raising Committee which raises fund for services and initiatives.

== History ==
HKSPC was founded in 1926 by Mr T.M. Hazlerigg.

In 2022, the Director of the charity resigned following incidents of abuse by staff towards toddlers.

In 2023, a former staff member at the Children’s Residential Home in Mong Kok was convicted of abuse and sentenced to 27 months in jail.

In 2024, they hosted a charity art exhibit in West Kowloon.

== Services ==
HKSPC provides a wide range of services, including childcare, pre-primary education, family service, social work, rehabilitation and parenting support.

=== Nursery schools and day crèches ===
HKSPC operates five-day crèches (for infants to 2-year-olds) and 16 nursery schools (for children aged 2 to 6 years old) to take care of more than 2,500 children throughout the SAR. Many of these children come from less privileged and/or families with acute social problems.

	Day creches
1	Jessie Tam Day Creche
2	SIA Shaukiwan Day Creche
3	William Grimsdale Day Creche
4	Air Cargo Community Day Creche
5	Esther Lee Day Creche

- Ocean Shores Nursery School also provides day creche service

	Nursery schools
1	Thomas Tam Nursery School
2	SIA Whampoa Nursery School
3	Park'N Shop Staff Charitable Fund Nursery School
4	Ma Tau Chung Nursery School
5	Hong Kong Bank Foundation Nursery School
6	Cheung Sha Wan Nursery School
7	Mr. & Mrs. Thomas Tam Nursery School
8	BOC Nursery School
9	Ocean Shores Nursery School
10	Portland Street Nursery School
11	Butterfly Estate Nursery School
12	The Jockey Club Hok Sam Nursery School
13	Lam Woo Nursery School
14	Operation Santa Claus Fanling Nursery School
15	Sze Wu Shu Min Nursery School
16	Sham Tseng Nursery School

=== Children and Family Services Centres ===
The two Children and Family Services Centres, located in Mongkok and Kowloon City, aim at early identifying the needs of families in the districts, developing comprehensive community networks and making referral to suitable services in the community. The centres provide community support services including after-school care, tutorial classes and parent-child quality play corner. The centre in Kowloon City also serves ethnic minority families.

=== Children's Residential Home ===
Children’s Residential Home is the largest residential crèche for children under 3 years of age in Hong Kong. It provides round-the-clock care for children who cannot be properly taken care of by their families and referred to the organisation by social workers and Social Welfare Department. It is also the only centre in Hong Kong offering 24-hour occasional residential care service to babies under the age of 2 for families with urgent needs.

=== Centre for Child Enlightenment ===
The centre offers support services for children with diverse developmental needs, their parents, early childhood educators and schools. Its provides professional consultation, assessment, counseling and individual/group training delivered by its service team comprising educational psychologists, speech therapists, occupational therapists, physiotherapists, trainers, and registered social workers.
