= Lo Man-kam =

Hong Kong politician (1893–1959)

Sir Man-kam Lo CBE
- 羅文錦爵士
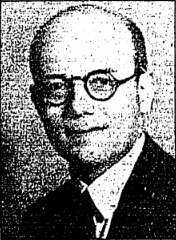

Unofficial Member of the Executive Council of Hong Kong
- In office 1946–1959
- Appointed by: Sir Mark Young; Sir Alexander Grantham
- Preceded by: Robert Kotewall

Unofficial Member of the Legislative Council of Hong Kong
- In office 9 November 1935 – 5 June 1950
- Appointed by: N. L. Smith; Sir Geoffry Northcote; Sir Mark Young
- Preceded by: Robert Kotewall
- Succeeded by: Lo Man-wai

1st President of AFC
- In office 1954–1954
- Preceded by: None (position established)
- Succeeded by: Kwok Chan

Personal details
- Born: 21 July 1893 Punyu, Canton, Qing Empire
- Died: 7 March 1959 (aged 65) British Hong Kong
- Resting place: Chiu Yuen Cemetery
- Spouse: Victoria Hotung
- Children: Lo Tak-shing; Lo Pui-yiu; Lo Pui-kin; Lo Pui-yin
- Occupation: Solicitor politician

Sir Man-kam Lo, CBE (Chinese: 羅文錦; 21 July 1893 – 7 March 1959) was an Eurasian lawyer in Hong Kong and unofficial member of the Executive Council and the Legislative Council of Hong Kong.

== Early life and education ==
Man-kam Lo was born into a prominent Eurasian family in July 1893. His father was Lo Cheung-shiu, a compradore of Jardine, Matheson & Co. At the age of 13, he left Hong Kong to study law in England in 1906. He graduated with First Class Honours in the Law Society Examinations in London and returned to Hong Kong in 1915. He began practicing law and later became the senior partner of the law firm Lo & Lo.

In 1918, he married Victoria Hotung, the eldest daughter of Robert Ho Tung, a prominent Hong Kong businessman and close friend of his father's.

== Family ==
Man-kam Lo was the eldest child of Lo Cheung-shiu and Shi Sheung-hing. He had three brothers (Man-wai, Man-ho and Man-hin) and five sisters. Man-wai Lo also became a lawyer and partner in Lo and Lo, and served on the Legislative and Executive Councils.

Man-kam Lo and Victoria had six children: Gwendolyn, Wilbur, Phoebe, Vera, Rita and Lo Tak-shing.

Lo Tak Sing followed in his father's footsteps, becoming a lawyer and member of the Executive and Legislative Councils. He ran as a candidate in the first elections for Chief Executive of Hong Kong following the transfer of Hong Kong's sovereignty to China in 1997.

== Public life ==
When the first large-scale labour strike broke out in Hong Kong in 1920, Man-kam Lo acted as a legal adviser to the strike organiser, the Chinese Mechanics Institute, and negotiated an agreement between the workers and employers. He was appointed Justice of the Peace in 1921.

During the Canton-Hong Kong strike, Lo and his brother Lo Man-wai joined the Hong Kong Volunteer Defence Corps, and more Hong Kong Chinese followed.

Lo was ambivalent on the mui-tsai system, a form of child slavery then prevalent in colonial Hong Kong. Initially an ardent defender like Sir Robert Hotung, his father-in-law, he later supported its abolition.

From 1929 to 1930, he was the chairman of the Tung Wah Hospital and the honorary legal adviser for the Tung Wah Group of Hospitals. In 1931, he served as honorary legal adviser for the Po Leung Kuk society and the Chinese Gold and Silver Exchange. He became the vice-chairman of the Rotary Club in 1932 and the chairman the following year. In January 1934, he was named chairman of the Hong Kong Society for the Protection of Children.

In May 1929, he was elected member of the Sanitary Board. He was also a member of the University Council of the University of Hong Kong from 1932 to 1956, vice-chairman of the Hong Kong Football Association in 1933 and first President of the Asian Football Confederation in 1954.

Man-kam Lo succeeded his mother-in-law Clara Cheung Lin-kok as director of the Tung Lin Kok Yuen in Happy Valley after her death. Po Kok School was founded and expanded by the Tung Lin Kok Yuen under Man-kam Lo.

He received the King George V Silver Jubilee Medal in 1935 and the King George VI Coronation Medal in 1937. In 1941, he was named a Commander of the Order of the British Empire.

== Legislative Council Unofficial member ==
In 1935, Lo-man Kam succeeded Robert Kotewall as one of the three Chinese representatives in the Legislative Council. During his tenure, he was an outspoken advocate for the Chinese community.

Lo supported the government's policy on hiring more local civil servants after a report on government salaries led to a public uproar. Governor Andrew Caldecott adopted the policy in 1935 to consider local candidates before vacancies were advertised in Britain.

Amidst the threat of a Japanese invasion, Lo was appointed to the Taxation Committee in December 1938, which intended to introduce new taxes to raise extra revenue in preparation for war. The Taxation Committee was replaced by the War Revenue Committee in 1940 and Lo was reappointed to the committee. Due to pressure from the business sector, the Committee rejected the government's proposed Income Tax Bill, recommending instead a partial income tax.

Man-kam Lo was an outspoken opponent of the colonial government's policy of racial segregation, which remained in place until 1946. Together with José Pedro Braga, who later became the first Portuguese appointed to the Legislative Council, he founded the League of Fellowship in 1921, aimed at eliminating "racial disabilities" and "promoting good fellowship within the Colony, irrespective of race, class and creed." On 26 July 1946, following a second reading of a bill in the Legislative Council aimed at repealing the Peak District Reservation Ordinance, a controversial law that prohibited Chinese from living in The Peak district, Lo argued that "the Chinese had no particular desire to live on the Peak. Their opposition was based solely on grounds of racial discrimination."

In 1940, on the eve of the Pacific War, Man-kam Lo and Leo d'Almada e Castro, the Portuguese representative in the Legislative Council, criticized authorities after a government ship evacuating British nationals to Australia, a majority of whom were of pure European descent, forced a number of Eurasians to disembark in Manila, the Philippines, on the grounds that Eurasians would feel more at ease among brown or yellow-skinned people. At a Financial Committee meeting, Lo raised the issue of racial discrimination, stating that "the tax-payers of this colony are being made to pay for the evacuation of a very small and selected section of the community and, whenever necessary, for their maintenance and support during an indefinite period, leaving some 99.9 percent of the population uncared for and unprotected when an emergency does come."

== Japanese occupation ==
During the Japanese occupation of Hong Kong, many local Chinese leaders including Man-kam Lo were pressured by the Japanese authorities to serve on various representative committees. After the petition of the Chinese Chamber of Commerce on the difficulties of the disruption of public utilities and of supplies, the currency problem, and prostitution, the Japanese authorities formed the Rehabilitation Advisory Committee. Robert Kotewall and Sir Shouson Chow were appointed chairman and vice-chairman respectively and Man-kam Lo was appointed member of the committee. The committee held 59 meetings and was later replaced by the Chinese Representative Council and Chinese Cooperative Council, in which he was a member of the latter.

Lo was able to escape the opprobrium of outright collaboration with the occupying troops due to a series of possibly "diplomatic" illnesses. In contrast to his years on the Legislative Council before the war, Lo generally remained silent on the wartime councils. One of the only times he spoke was when the Japanese authorities asked how they might improve relations between the Chinese and Japanese. He replied that Japanese troops could take the initiative by not urinating in public.

After the British returned in 1945, many local leaders who had collaborated with the Japanese were denied appointments to public positions. Robert Kotewall was asked to withdraw from public life and had to resign from the Executive Council. Sir Shouson Chow never completely returned and Li Tse-fong was not reappointed to the Legislative Council. However, Man-kam Lo was able to return to public life because the British believed he had worked with the Japanese only with great reluctance.

== Post-war career ==
In 1946, Man-kam Lo was appointed to the Executive Council and re-appointed to the Legislative Council, where he played an important role during his tenure. He was subsequently knighted in 1948 for his efforts in helping to rebuild Hong Kong.

After the Second World War, the UK's Labour Government decided to give people in the colonies a greater say over their affairs. On his return to Hong Kong in 1946, Governor Sir Mark Young announced a constitutional reform plan of "giving to the inhabitants of the Colony a fuller and more responsible share in the management of their own affairs." The Young Plan proposed an increase in the number of seats for unofficial members on the Legislative Council and the creation of a municipal council elected by the people of Hong Kong. It also proposed the imposition of direct taxes to fund more social services, an idea Man-kam Lo supported.

Young's successor Sir Alexander Grantham, however, did not share the same view as Young. With the Chinese Communists gaining in power during the civil war, Grantham advised Downing Street against implementing the reforms, believing that it would provide a potential opening for a Communist backlash. At a meeting of the Legislative Council on 22 June 1949, Man-kam Lo suggested that the Young Plan was no longer the best option for giving Hong Kong residents a greater voice in the government. He tabled a revised proposal, supported by all unofficial members, which called for a smaller Legislative Council with an unofficial majority and the scrapping of the municipal council. Fearing a negative reaction from the Communists, the British Cabinet rejected both Young's reforms and Lo's proposals, deciding instead to allow for the creation of two elected seats in the Urban Council.

Man-kam Lo was a supporter of educational reform in Hong Kong. He helped Li Luk-wah establish a school for the deaf and supported Bishop Hall in his efforts to organize schools for the children of workers. In 1950, he sought to have children who were unable to attend primary school registered and recommended to the Legislative Council that the government open an inquiry into government spending on education, arguing that the Grant Code that enabled secondary schools to receive grants was overly generous. Subsequently, the government invited N.G. Fisher, the Chief Education Officer of Manchester, to conduct an inquiry; the resulting report became a significant blueprint for education reform in Hong Kong.

In 1950, the government appointed Man-kam Lo to the Committee on Chinese Laws and Customs in Hong Kong, whose aim was to recommend changes to local Chinese customs. In the committee's report, Lo recommended that the custom of Chinese men taking concubines be left untouched on the grounds that the old law "if it is not so acted upon...will gradually die out."

In March 1951, Man-kam Lo received an honorary degree from the University of Hong Kong.

== Death ==
Late in his life, Lo suffered from heart disease. On 7 March 1959, he died suddenly of a heart attack at 7:45 pm at his Robinson Road residence. He was 67. Lo had been planning to attend a banquet at Government House on the occasion of a visit by Prince Philip, Duke of Edinburgh.

On the day of his funeral, hundreds of prominent local residents, including Governor Sir Robert Black and Commander of the British Forces Bastyan. paid their respects at Lo's residence and at Wing Pit Ting, the "farewell pavilion" in Pokfulam, with the Hong Kong Police band leading the cortege. Wreaths were sent from Governor Black, Secretary of State for the Colonies Alan Lennox-Boyd and former Hong Kong governor Sir Alexander Grantham.

Lo was highly regarded by Sir Alexander Grantham in his autobiography Via Ports. Grantham said Lo was outstanding as an Executive Council member and had "a first class brain, great moral courage and a capacity for digging down into details without becoming lost in them."

Non-profit organization positions
| Preceded by Sir Shiu-kin Tang | Chairman of the Tung Wah Hospital; 1929–1930 | Succeeded by Leung But-yu |
Legislative Council of Hong Kong
| Preceded by R. H. Kotewall | Chinese Unofficial Member; 1935–1941 | Japanese occupation of Hong Kong |
| Preceded by Chau Tsun-nin | Senior Chinese Unofficial Member; 1939–1941 | Japanese occupation of Hong Kong |
| Preceded by Japanese occupation of Hong Kong | Chinese Unofficial Member; 1946–1950 | Succeeded by Lo Man-wai |
Political offices
| Preceded by Ho Sai-chuen | Member of the Sanitary Board; 1929–1932 | Succeeded by Li Shu-fan |
| Preceded by Japanese occupation of Hong Kong | Chinese Unofficial Member of the Executive Council of Hong Kong; 1946–1959; With: Chau Tsun-nin | Succeeded by Ngan Shing-kwan |
Sporting positions
| Preceded by Arthur Morse | President of Hong Kong Football Association; 1953–1954 | Succeeded by Kwok Chan |
| New creation | President of Asian Football Confederation; 1954 | Succeeded by Kwok Chan |
