= Diocesan Boys' School =

Christian boys' school in Hong Kong

- 拔萃男書院
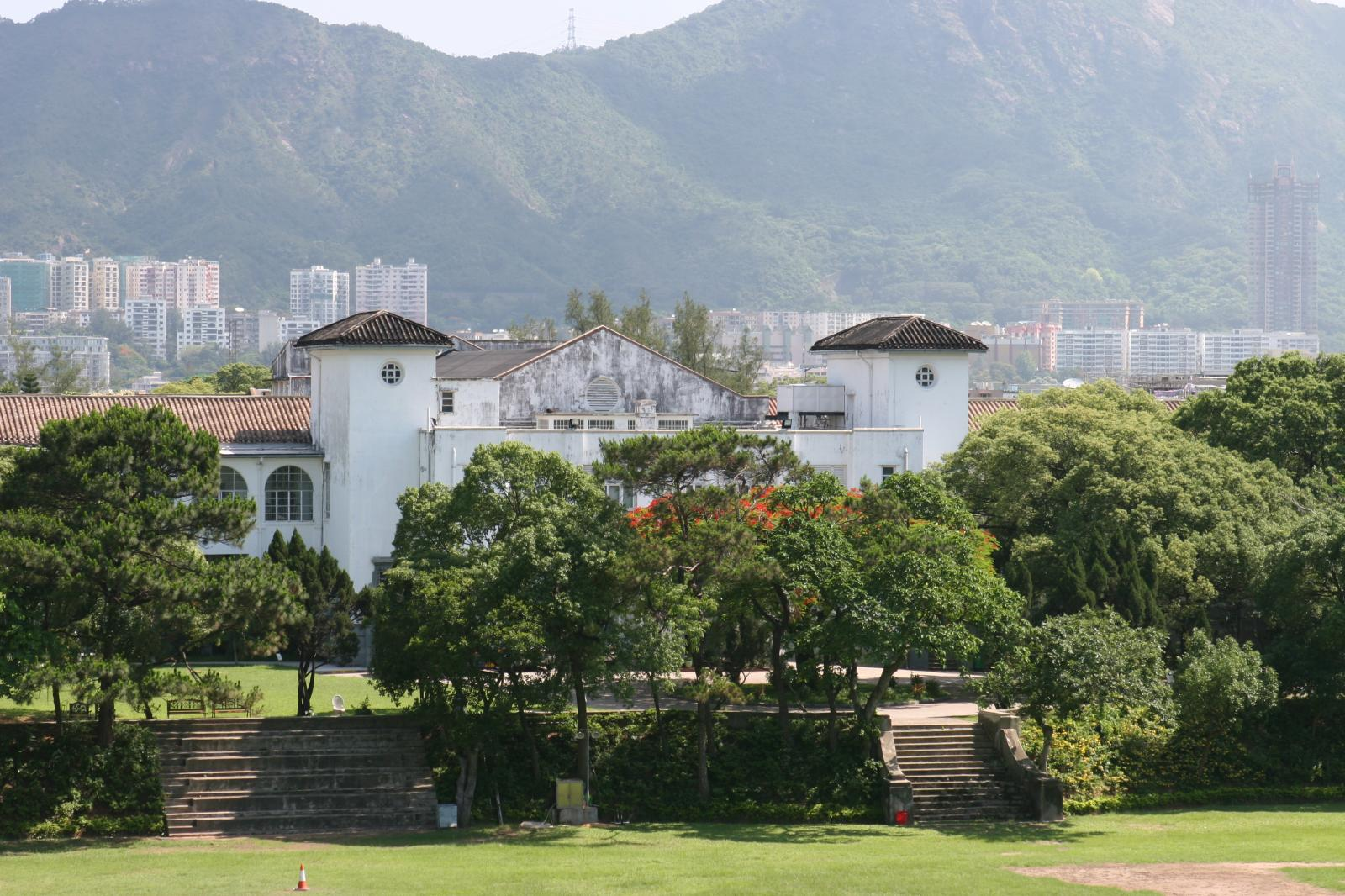

Location
- 131 Argyle Street, Mong Kok, Kowloon; Hong Kong; 22°19′24″N 114°10′27″E

Information
- School type: DSS, Grant School, Secondary; primary (since 2004)
- Religious affiliation: Hong Kong Sheng Kung Hui
- Established: 1869; 157 years ago
- President: Matthias Der
- Dean: Rosene Ghafur; Cho Ka Wai; Wong Yuen Ting
- Headmaster: Cheng Kay Yen Ronnie
- Faculty: 136 teachers
- Grades: G7 (Form 1) – G12 (Form 6)
- Language: English
- Campus size: 50,000 m^{2} (540,000 sq ft)
- Houses: Arthur Piercy; Sykes; Featherstone; Sargent; Goodban; George She Lowcock
- Colours: Navy blue, white and red
- Newspaper: Not Rigmarole (粹聞)
- Yearbook: Steps (集思)
- Website: www.dbs.edu.hk

Chinese name
- Traditional Chinese: 拔萃男書院
- Simplified Chinese: 拔萃男书院
Transcriptions
Standard Mandarin
- Hanyu Pinyin: Bácuì Nán Shūyuàn
Yue: Cantonese
- Yale Romanization: Baht seuih nàahm syū yuhn
- Jyutping: Bat6 seoi6 naam4 syu1 jyun6

Diocesan Boys' School (DBS) is a day and boarding Hong Kong Sheng Kung Hui boys' school in Hong Kong, located at 131 Argyle Street, Mong Kok, Kowloon. Having run as a grant-aided school since it was founded, the school commenced operation in the Direct Subsidy Scheme in September 2003. It uses English as the medium of instruction. As of 2026, the headmaster was Ronnie Cheng Kay-Yen.

== History ==
=== The first foundation ===
In 1860, Lydia Smith (wife of the Bishop of Victoria) and the Society for the Promotion of Female Education in the Far East (also known as the Female Education Society, or FES) set up the Diocesan Native Female Training School. It was a day-school turned boarding school for native girls, and was affiliated with the Diocese of Victoria. As stated in its first annual report, the purpose of the school was "to introduce among a somewhat superior class of native females the blessings of Christianity and of religious training". The school sat on Bonham Road, a small concrete house on a paddy field. Lady Robinson (the Governor's wife) became the patron.

The school had a difficult existence. The Second Opium War aroused strong anti-British sentiment and so it was very unpopular for Chinese girls to learn English. The school was closed and then reopened under the name "Diocesan Female School", but its finances did not improve. In 1868, Bishop Charles Alford took the school under his immediate superintendence.

=== The second foundation ===
==== 19th century ====
On 30 January 1869, in a bid to gain popular support, Bishop Alford issued an appeal to admit boys into the school and to turn it into an orphanage. The appeal was well received by the public. In September, the Diocesan Home and Orphanage was established for boys and girls, foreign or Chinese.

In July 1870, William Arthur, formerly of the Garrison School, was appointed as the headmaster and his wife as the matron.

In 1878, the school was placed in the grant-in-aid scheme by the Education Department.

In March 1878, Arthur resigned. Bishop Burdon proposed to stop admitting boys into the school and to bring it under the FES. In July, he withdrew his proposal following pressure from William Beswick, honorary treasurer of the DHO, although the Bishop still thought it inappropriate to have boys and girls boarding in the same school campus.

On 1 November 1878, George Piercy, then master of the Government Central School, was appointed to be the new headmaster. Piercy focused on the students' academics, and the school attained satisfactory results in the Cambridge and Oxford Local Examinations scholarships.

On 31 May 1879, the school committee resolved to stop accepting girls as boarders.

In 1891, the school was renamed the Diocesan School and Orphanage. In 1892, the remaining girls were transferred to Fairlea Girls' School (a forerunner of Heep Yunn School). The Diocesan School and Orphanage was transformed into a boys' school.

==== Early 20th century ====
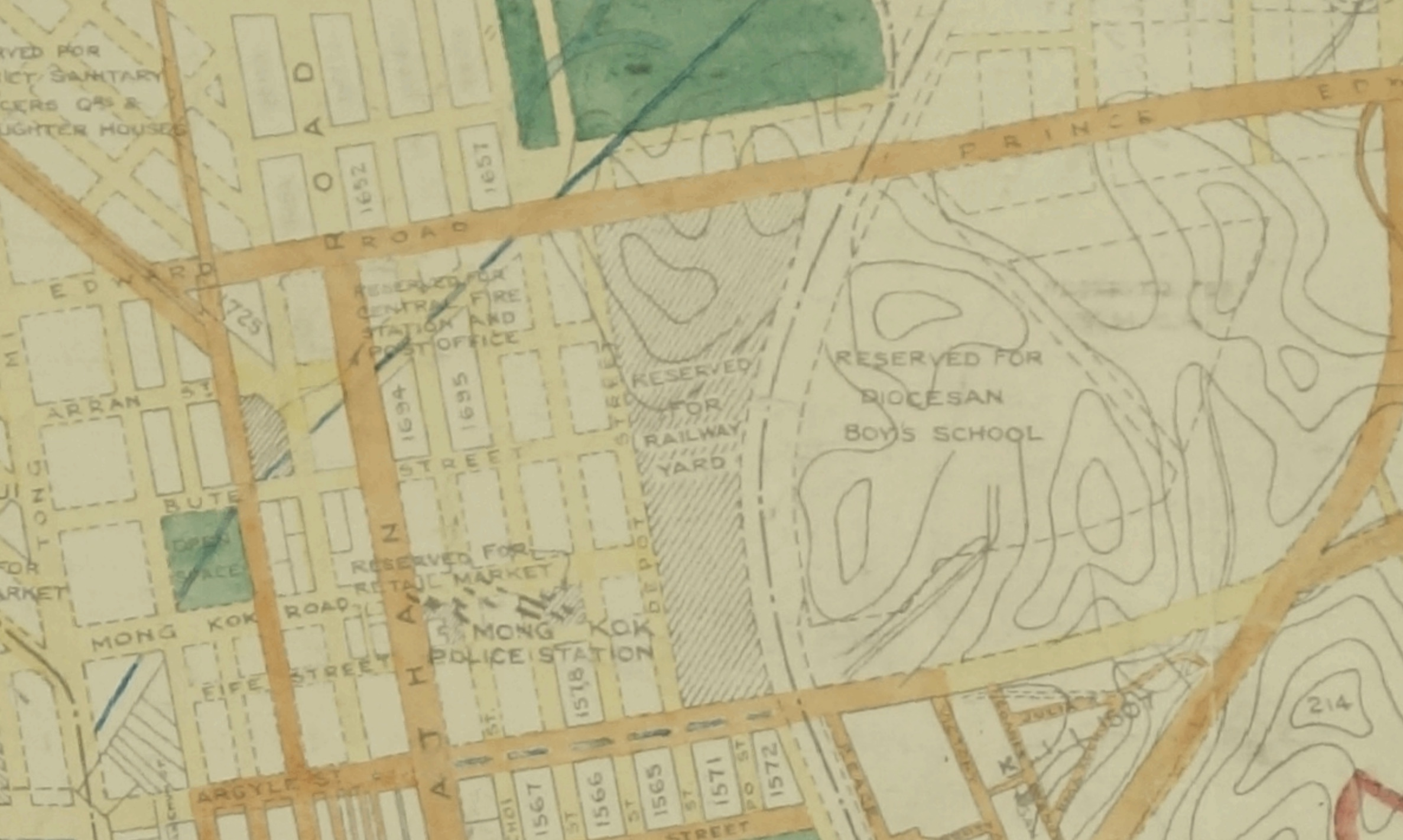
Planned Development of Mong Kok in 1926.

In 1902, the school was renamed as Diocesan Boys' School and Orphanage. It is unclear when the school was renamed Diocesan Boys' School, although the name was used as early as 1918.

Rev. William Featherstone, headmaster from 1918 to 1931, introduced the prefects' system, a house system and Speech Day. He also moved the school from Bonham Road to a hill site in Mong Kok. Construction was completed in 1926. In February 1927, the British military authorities took the school for use as a hospital for one year.

When the Second Sino-Japanese War broke out in China in 1937, the school showed its support towards the Chinese Nationalist Party. In January 1938, a shoe-shining club was organised under the permission of Rev. Christopher Sargent to raise funds for the Nationalist government. Boys went to schools around Hong Kong and polished shoes for teachers and students. In 1939, there was a school strike when a student with Japanese citizenship was appointed as head prefect.

During the Japanese occupation of Hong Kong, most of the school staff, including then-headmaster Gerald Goodban, were imprisoned. The school building was transformed into a military hospital for soldiers of the Imperial Japanese Army.

==== Post-war years ====
Imperial Japan surrendered in August 1945. The school remained under the control of the Kempeitai until November (i.e., when all the Japanese soldiers were captured).

On 21 March 1946, J. L. YoungSaye, a senior teacher, got the school to run again. Oswald Cheung and B. J. Monks took up the post of acting headmaster successively. Goodban returned from England on 19 November 1947. Repairs started during the Christmas holidays.

In 1949, Goodban introduced a new house system in which houses were named after former headmasters, along with the Piercy Challenge Shield.

In the early 1950s, construction plans for a gymnasium, a Carnegie Hall (the old art room beside the demolished gymnasium) and a science wing were proposed.

In 1955, Canon George Zimmern, also known as George She, was appointed the next headmaster, the first Hong Kong-born old boy to be given the role. As headmaster, Canon She welcomed students from poor households and affirmed the Chinese language in school culture. Canon She also introduced the Garden Fête in 1955.

It was decided that the primary classes should be dropped for lack of space and that a completely new primary school - Diocesan Preparatory School - would be built, although the decision was only implemented in 1969.

James Lowcock became headmaster in 1961. Based on his previous experience in the school, he restructured the administration to improve efficiency and appointed more teachers to posts with designated duties. In 1983, Jacland Lai succeeded Mr. Lowcock as headmaster. A language laboratory and a demonstration room were built. The electrics and alarm installations were renovated, the school walls repainted, and the facilities were computerised throughout the school.

==== 2000s ====
In 2002, Lai was succeeded by Terence Chang, an old boy and then-headmaster of Jockey Club Ti-I College.

On 4 October 2002, the school committee proposed to join the Direct Subsidy Scheme (DSS) with effect from September 2003. The application was accepted by the Education and Manpower Bureau in March 2003. The DSS was fiercely debated within the School throughout 2002. Chang was highly in favour of joining the DSS, but some students and most teachers opposed the DSS because they were afraid it would shut out students from poorer families. Alumni on the whole were slightly inclined towards the DSS. The school claimed that the parents were in favour, though its findings have since been criticised as biased.

A primary school was built beside the secondary school campus. The project was financed by the government as part of the deal that saw the school join the DSS. The Diocesan Boys' School Primary Division (DBSPD) had its first, partial intake of students in 2004 and expanded its intake with students aged between 6 and 12 over the following years.

In April 2012, Diocesan Boys' School became the first secondary school in Hong Kong to have a school app on iOS and Android.

In September 2012, Chang retired and Ronnie Kay Yen Cheng – an alumnus who had been the conductor of the school choirs – succeeded him as headmaster.

In May 2020, the school became the world's No.1 International Baccalaureate school, with an average mark of 42.

In September 2025, the Junior Forms Curriculum Coordinator Rosene Ghafur succeeded Ng Kay Kong as Dean.

== Campus ==
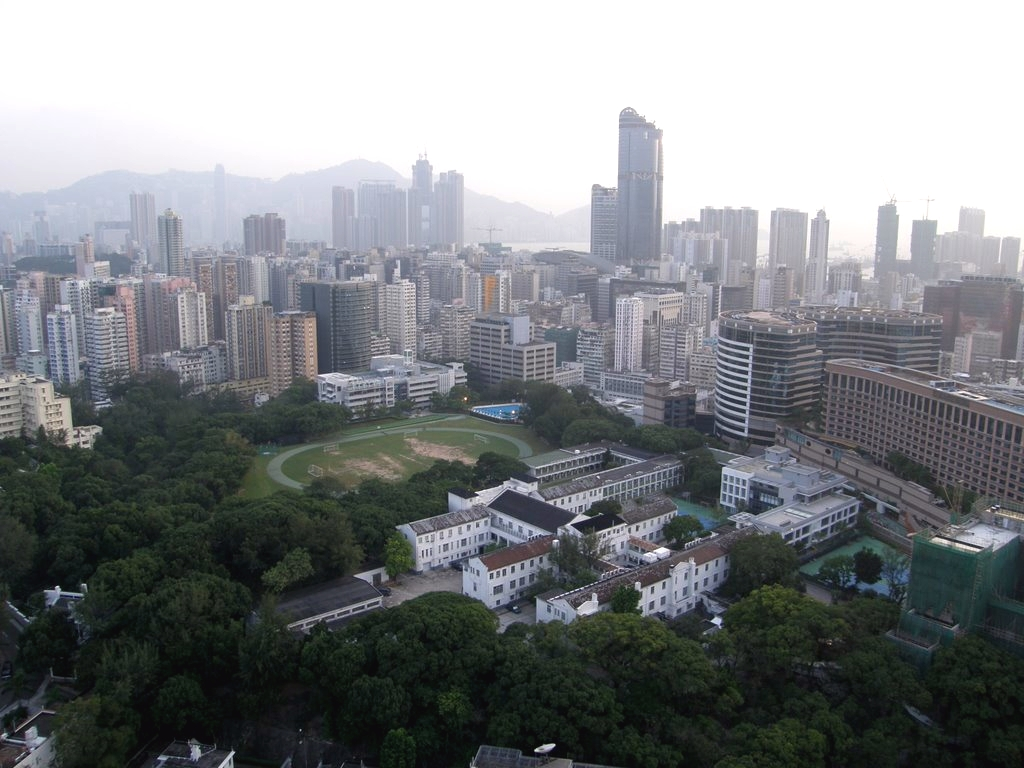
School campus in September 2007, with running track on school field. Behind the school field is the campus of the Primary Division.

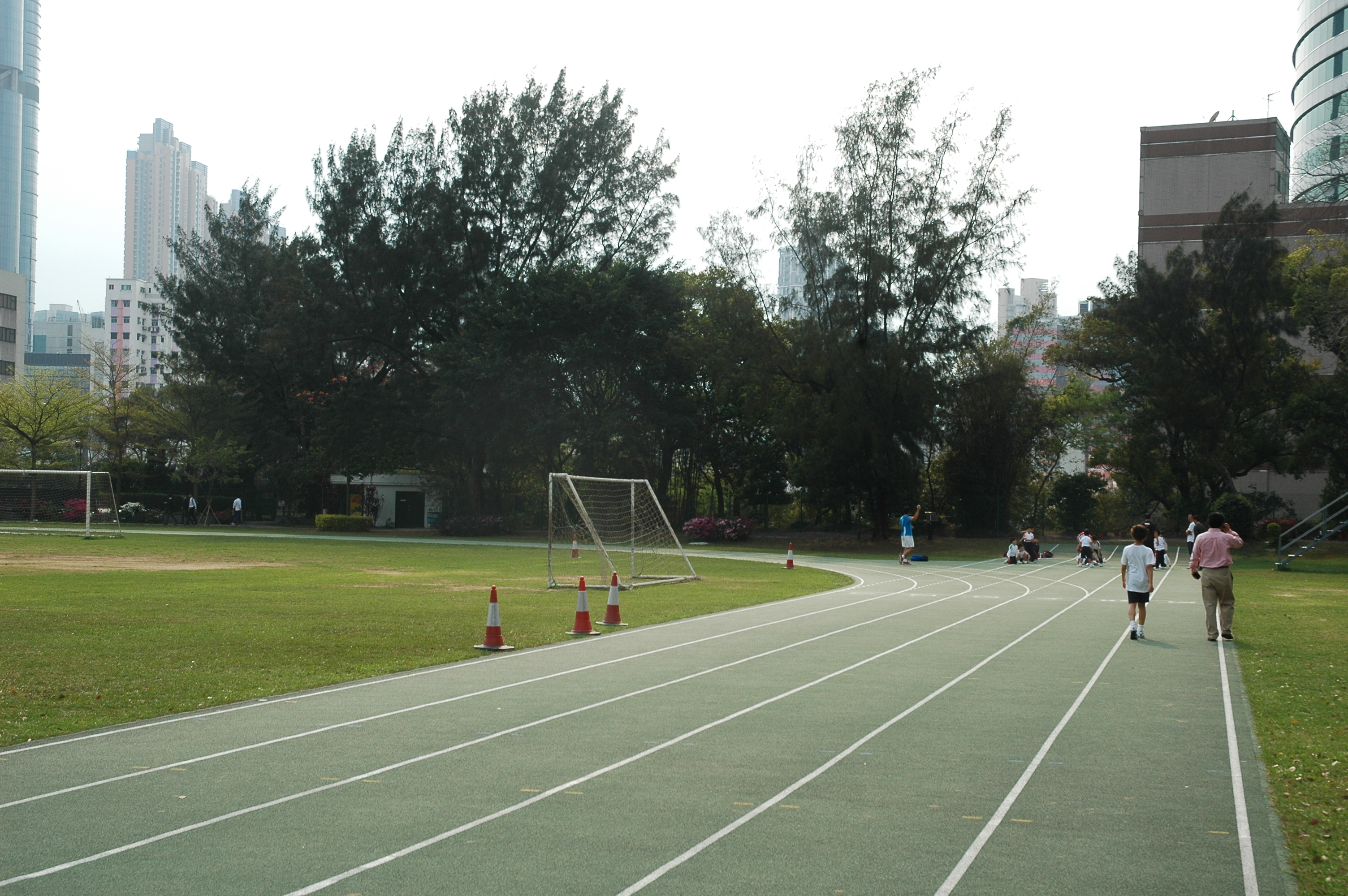
The running track in March 2012

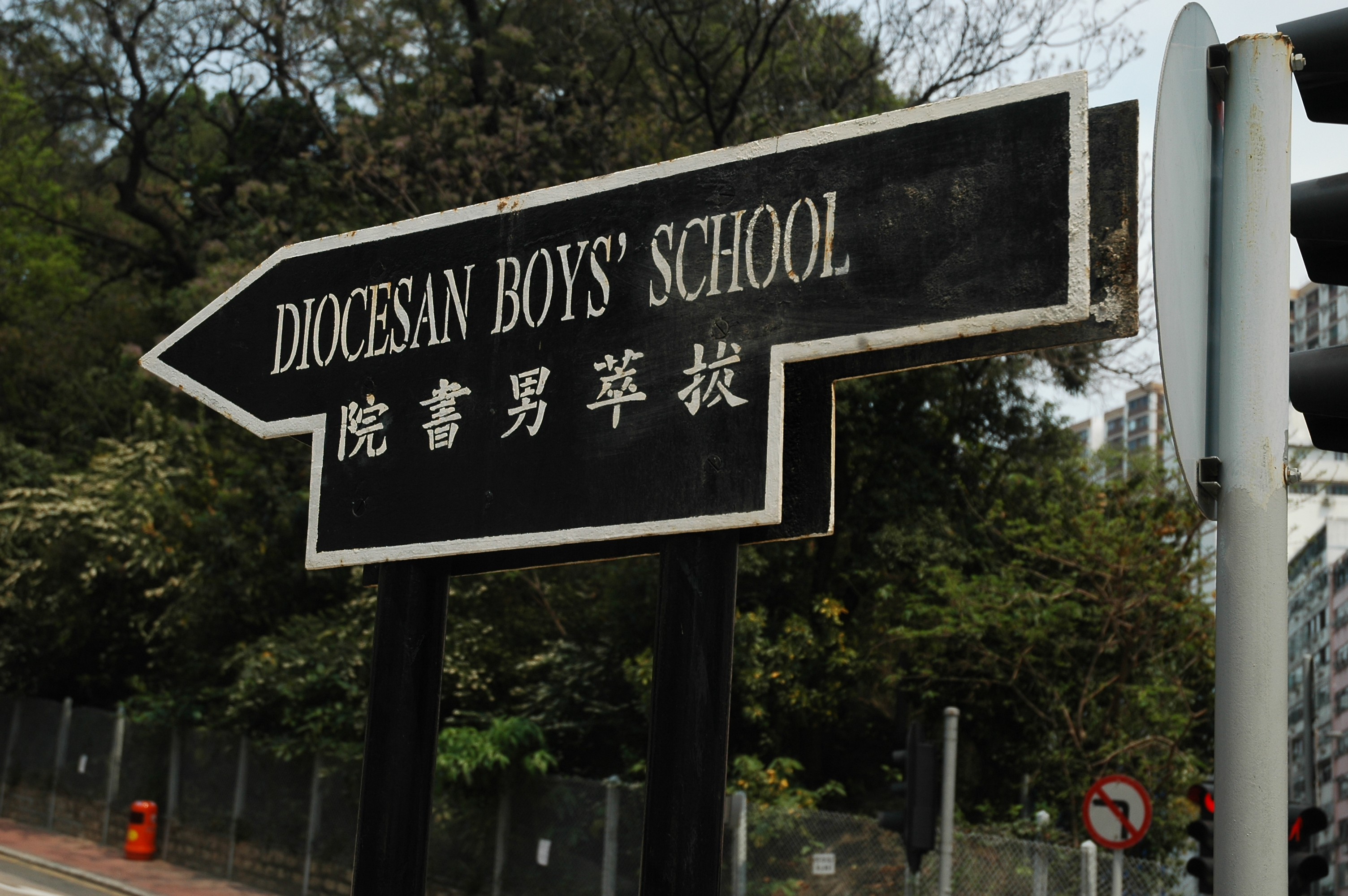
Sign at the bottom of the school drive in March 2012

The school is located on Kadoorie Hill in Ho Man Tin, Kowloon City District.

== 21st century ==
In March 2009, the school received media attention when a Form 4 student complained that he had had a nude female model as a subject in his art class, and alleged embarrassment. The visual arts teacher, employed for 27 years, told reporters that he had been inviting nude models without any complaint for nearly ten years. Then-Headmaster Terence Chang said it was a "big fuss about nothing".

=== National security education ===
In December 2022, DBS said that it had already implemented national security education into its curriculum. The school stated that "The objective is to deepen students' understanding of the country's development and national security, enhance their sense of national identity and nurture them as good law-abiding citizens."

== Alumni ==
=== Politicians ===
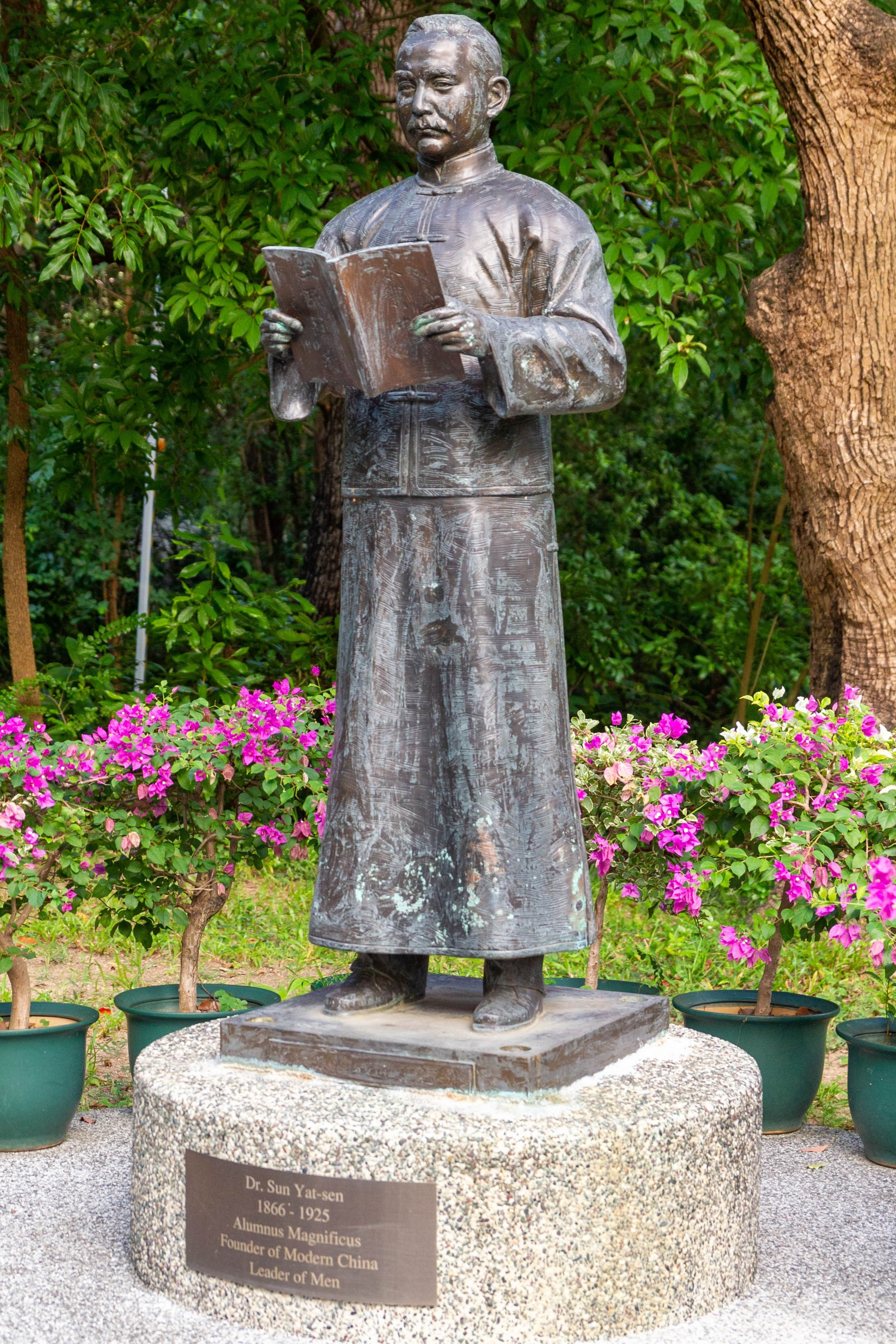
Statue of Sun Yat-sen on campus, unveiled in 2011

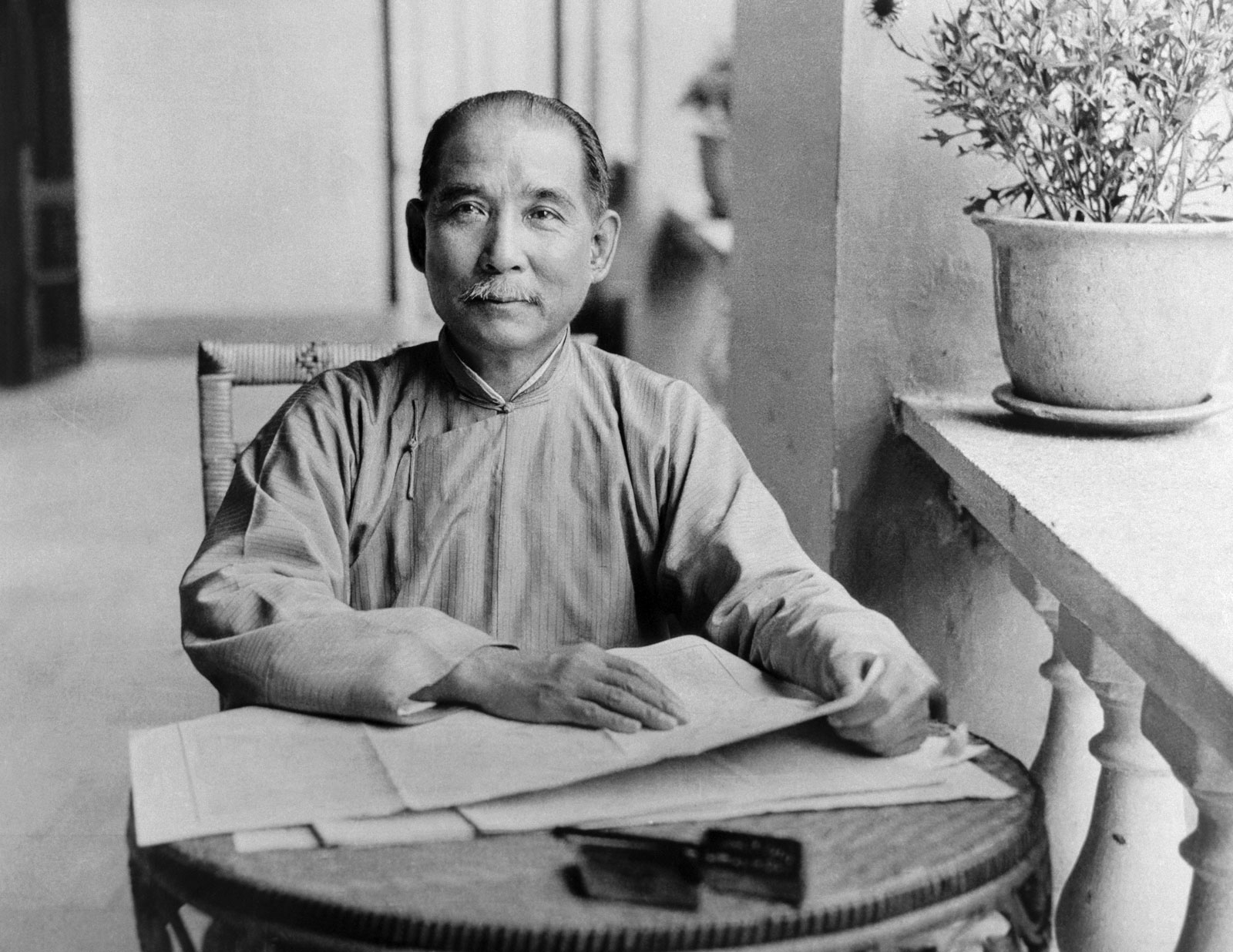
Dr. Sun Yat-sen in 1924

- Sun Yat-sen (孫中山) (1866-1925), Chinese revolutionary and statesman, "Father of Modern China"
- Sir Robert Kotewall (羅旭龢) (1880-1949), colonial businessman and politician
- Yeung Kai-yin (楊啟彥) (1941-2007), chairman and chief executive of Kowloon-Canton Railway Corporation (KCRC), Secretary for Education and Manpower, Secretary for Transport and Secretary for the Treasury
- James Tien Pei Chun (田北俊), former chairman of the Liberal Party and member of the Legislative Council
- Michael Tien Puk Sun (田北辰), member of the Legislative Council and former chairman of the board of the KCRC
- Tommy Cheung, Leader of the Liberal Party and member of the Legislative Council
- Dominic Lee, member of the Legislative Council and former member of the Sham Shui Po District Council
- Kenneth Chen Wei-on, Secretary-General of the Legislative Council and former Undersecretary for Education
- Eddie Yue Wai-man (余偉文), Chief Executive of the Hong Kong Monetary Authority
- Patrick Ho, former Secretary for Home Affairs, convicted of bribery offences in a U.S. federal court in 2018
- Timothy Tong, former Commissioner of the ICAC and Commissioner of Customs and Excise
- Joshua Law Chi-kong, Former Secretary for the Civil Service, Permanent Secretary for Security, Permanent Secretary for Constitutional and Mainland Affairs, and Permanent Representative to the World Trade Organization

=== Law ===
- William Ngartse Thomas Tam (1900–1976), barrister, magistrate, member of the Legislative Council
- G. S. Zimmern (施玉麒) (1904–1979), barrister, magistrate, headmaster of DBS
- Kwan Cho-yiu (關祖堯) (1907–1971), judge, member of the Executive and Legislative Councils
- Kan Yuet-keung (簡悅強) (1913–2012), solicitor, member of the Executive and Legislative Councils, banker
- Oswald Cheung (張奧偉) (1922–2003), barrister, member of the Executive and Legislative Councils, acting headmaster of DBS
- Henry Litton, former Permanent Judge of the Court of Final Appeal, Hong Kong
- Aarif Barma (鮑晏明), Justice of Appeal of the Court of Appeal
- Pang Kin-kee (彭鍵基), former High Court judge and former chairman of the Electoral Affairs Commission (EAC)
- Azizul Rahman Suffiad (石輝), former High Court judge (1997-2014), former Commissioner on Interception of Communications and Surveillance (2015-2021), Chairman of the Islamic Union of Hong Kong

=== Commerce ===
- Lam Kin Ming (林建名), chairman of Lai Sun Group
- Henry Fan (范鴻齡), Chairman of the Hospital Authority, former Unofficial Member of the Executive Council, former managing director of CITIC Pacific and former vice-chairman of Cathay Pacific
- Canning Fok (霍建寧), group managing director of Hutchison Whampoa
- Daryl Ng (黃永光), deputy chairman of Sino Group
- V-Nee Yeh (葉維義), founder of Value Partners (asset management) and member of the Executive Council

=== Education and academia ===
- Chan Wing Tsit (陳榮捷) (1901–1994), sinologist, professor of philosophy at Dartmouth College and Columbia University
- Tam Sheung Wai (譚尚渭), president emeritus of the Open University of Hong Kong
- Robert Chung Ting Yiu (鍾庭耀), director of the Public Opinion Programme at HKU
- Chan Hing-yan (陳慶恩), chair of the Department of Music at HKU
- Lai Ching Lung (黎青龍), professor of medicine at HKU
- Benny Tai Yiu-ting (戴耀廷), associate professor of law at HKU, initiator of Occupy Central
- Sir David Todd (達安輝) (1928-2017), professor of haematology at HKU, founding president of the Hong Kong College of Physicians

=== Arts and entertainment ===
- George Lam (林子祥), Cantopop star
- Li Chuan Yun (李傳韻), violinist
- Andrew Hin Yau Ling (凌顯祐), violinist, violist, conductor
- Aristo Sham, pianist
- Chapman To (杜汶澤), actor and entertainer
- Vivek Mahbubani, stand-up comedian
- Hubert Wu (胡鴻鈞), Cantopop singer
- Lo King-man (盧景文), performing artist and director, "Father of Hong Kong Opera"
- Byron Mann (文峰), actor

=== Mass culture and journalism ===
- Alex Law Kai-yui (羅啟銳), film director
- Josiah Lau Ka Kit (劉家傑), host of "One Minute's English" (RTHK)

=== Sports ===
- Roy Lamsam (伍劭雄), cricketer
- William Hill, Olympic sprinter (1964)
- Denis Cunningham, Olympic fencer (1976, 1984), chairman of Hong Kong Fencing Association
- Lai Chun Ho (黎振浩), Olympic sprinter (2008, 2012)
- Chan Ming Tai (陳銘泰), Olympic long jumper (2016), holder of the Hong Kong record
- Ng Ka Long (伍家朗), Olympic badminton player (2016, 2020)
- Tan Chun Lok (陳俊樂), footballer, member of Hong Kong National Football Team, current plays for Hong Kong Premier League club Kitchee, formerly played for Chinese Super League club Guangzhou City
- Timothy Stephen Chow (周子謙) footballer, member of the Hong Kong national under-23 football team, currently plays for Hong Kong Premier League club HKFC.
- Yue Tze Nam (茹子楠), footballer, member of Hong Kong National Football Team, current plays for Chinese Super League club Beijing Guoan
- Sun Ming Him (孫銘謙), footballer, member of Hong Kong National Football Team, current plays for Chinese Super League club Tianjin Jinmen Tiger.
- Ng Yu Hei (吳宇曦), footballer, member of Hong Kong National Football Team, current plays for Chinese Super League club Chongqing Tonglianglong.
- Lawrence Ng Lok Wang (吳諾弘), Olympic foil fencer (2020)
- Coleman Wong Chak Lam (黃澤林), tennis player, winner of the Boys' Doubles titles at 2021 US Open and 2022 Australian Open
- Viking Wong (黃維俊), Brazilian jiu-jitsu practitioner and fashion designer

== See also ==
- Education in Hong Kong
- List of secondary schools in Hong Kong

== Sources ==
- Featherstone, W.T. (1930). The Diocesan Boys School and Orphanage, Hongkong: The History and Records, 1869 to 1929. With References to an Earlier Institution, Called the Diocesan Native Female Training School, Founded in 1867. Ye Olde Printerie.
- W. J. Smyly, A History of the Diocesan Boys' School (unpublished manuscript circa 1967)
- Fung, Y.W. (2004). A Tribute to Rev. Canon George She: Headmaster, 1955-1961, Diocesan Boys' School, Hong Kong. GS Book Editors.
- E. J. Eitel's letter to the Colonial Secretary in 1889, CO 129/342, quoted in Vicky Lee, Being Eurasian: Memories Across Racial Divides (Hong Kong University Press, 2004), p. 21
- Steps, Diocesan Boys' School, various years
- Fung, Y. W.; Chan-Yeung, Mo Wah Moira (2009). To Serve and to Lead. Aberdeen, Hong Kong: Hong Kong Univ. Press. ISBN 978-962-209-998-2.
