= David Todd (haematologist) =

Hong Kong physician, medical educator and hematologist

Sir David Todd CBE JP FRCP FRCPath FRCPE FRCPGlas
- Born: 17 November 1928; Guangzhou, China
- Died: 16 August 2017 (aged 88); Queen Mary Hospital, Pok Fu Lam, Hong Kong
- Education: University of Hong Kong (MBBS, MD)
- Known for: Contributions to medical education and training in Hong Kong
- Scientific career
- Fields: Hematology
- Institutions: University of Hong Kong; Queen Mary Hospital; Hong Kong Academy of Medicine
- Thesis: The haematological findings in cryptogenetic splenomegaly with and without cirrhosis and in primary carcinoma of the liver (1958)

David Todd (17 November 1928 – 16 August 2017) was a Hong Kong haematologist who acted as the founding president of the Hong Kong College of Physicians and the Hong Kong Academy of Medicine. He was best known for transforming medical education and training in Hong Kong.

== Early life and education ==
Todd was born in Guangzhou, China in 1928 to Chinese parents, but was placed in an orphanage and adopted in 1929 by American Presbyterian missionaries Paul Jerome Todd and Margaret Todd, who christened the baby David. Paul Todd was a surgeon and Margaret Todd was the head nurse at the Kung Yee Medical College (now Sun Yat-sen University of Medical Sciences), which they founded in 1909. They also established the Todd Clinic and Hospital (now part of the Guangzhou Women And Children's Medical Center) in 1931. David Todd had an elder sister, Lois, an obstetrician and gynaecologist, and a younger brother, Jonathan, a surgeon. Both were adopted.

Todd was sent to Hong Kong for secondary education in 1937, as the Second Sino-Japanese War unfolded, boarding at the Diocesan Boys' School. In 1941, when he was 14, Japan started occupying Hong Kong, and Todd fled to Shaoguan, Guangdong, to study at Lingnan Middle School. After the conclusion of the Second World War, Todd studied medicine at the Lingnan University in Guangzhou, but returned to Hong Kong in 1947 as the Chinese Civil War resumed. He entered year two of the MBBS programme at the University of Hong Kong, graduating in 1952. He stayed at Morrison Hall during his undergraduate years.

Todd received his MD in 1958 from the University of Hong Kong.

== Career and research ==
Todd spent 1 year as a pre-registration house officer (or houseman) after graduation, and then joined the department of medicine at Queen Mary Hospital, where he was mentored by Alexander James Smith McFadzean. Apart from a 2-year study at the Glasgow Royal Infirmary from 1956 to 1958, Todd stayed at Queen Mary Hospital and HKU throughout his career.

When McFadzean retired in 1974, Todd became the head of the Department of Medicine of the Faculty of Medicine (now Li Ka Shing Faculty of Medicine), University of Hong Kong (HKU), succeeded in 1989 by Tai Kwong Chan. Before 1981 when the Faculty of Medicine of the Chinese University of Hong Kong was founded, HKU was the only medical school in the city. Todd's role as department head meant he mentored many future Hong Kong physicians. During this time, Todd was instrumental in forming international collaborations with researchers the United Kingdom, and began conducting professional examinations of the Royal College of Physicians in Hong Kong.

Todd was a sub-dean of the HKU Faculty of Medicine from 1976 to 1978, and a pro-vice-chancellor of HKU between 1978 and 1980.

Todd founded the Hong Kong College of Physicians and the Hong Kong Academy of Medicine in 1986 and 1992 respectively, serving as the founding president of the former in 1986 and the latter from 1992 to 1996. He was also appointed to the inaugural 1990 Hospital Authority Board.

Todd has served on the boards of the Sino-British Fellowship Trust and the S. K. Yee Medical Foundation.

Todd retired 1994, remaining as a professor emeritus at HKU, and moved to Cambridge in 1997. He returned to Hong Kong in 2008.

As a haematologist, Todd, Yuet Wai Kan and collaborators discovered that the deletion of a gene could cause alpha-thalassemia the first demonstration of its kind for any disease. one of Todd's research focus was leukaemia. He contributed to the eventual approval of using arsenic trioxide to treat leukaemia.

== Personal life ==
Todd liked classical music and opera, which he enjoyed after retirement during his years at the United Kingdom.

Todd was not married and had no children.

== Honours and awards ==
- Justice of the Peace, United Kingdom
- Fellow of the Royal College of Physicians of Edinburgh (1966)
- Fellow of the Royal Australasian College of Physicians (1974)
- Fellow of the Royal College of Physicians (1976)
- Fellow of the Royal College of Physicians and Surgeons of Glasgow (1979)
- Honorary Fellow of the Academy of Medicine, Singapore (1987)
- Fellow of the Royal College of Pathologists (1992)
- Honorary Fellow of the Hong Kong College of Family Physicians (1993)
- Honorary Fellow of the Hong Kong Academy of Medicine (1997)
- Honorary Fellow of the Hong Kong College of Physicians (1997)
- Officer of the Most Excellent Order of the British Empire (OBE), United Kingdom (1982)
- Commander of the Most Excellent Order of the British Empire (CBE), United Kingdom (1990)
- Knight Bachelor, United Kingdom (1995)
- Honorary Fellow of the Royal College of Physicians and Surgeons of Glasgow (2008)

The Sir David Todd Professorship in Medicine at the University of Hong Kong and the David Todd Oration at the Hong Kong Academy of Medicine were named after Todd.
