= Hong Kong Academy of Medicine Ordinance =

The Hong Kong Academy of Medicine Ordinance (Chinese: 香港醫學專科學院條例; Cap. 419) is an ordinance of Hong Kong enacted by the Legislative Council of Hong Kong on 25 June 1992. It came into force on 1 August 1992 and established the Hong Kong Academy of Medicine (HKAM) as the statutory body responsible for specialist medical and dental education, training, accreditation and continuing professional development in Hong Kong. Fellowship of the Academy is the principal qualification for admission to the specialist register maintained by the Medical Council of Hong Kong and the Dental Council of Hong Kong.

== Background ==
The proposal to establish a statutory academy for specialist medical training emerged from discussions on specialist registration initiated by the Medical Council of Hong Kong in 1968. In 1986, the Government of Hong Kong appointed a Working Party on Postgraduate Medical Education and Training chaired by Dr Keith Halnan to review the territory's postgraduate specialist training system. The Working Party's report, submitted in 1988, recommended the creation of the Hong Kong Academy of Medicine as a statutory body responsible for setting and maintaining uniform standards for specialist training and accreditation.

The proposal received approval in principle from the Executive Council of Hong Kong in 1989, after which a Preparatory Committee chaired by Sir David Todd drafted the legislation. The Hong Kong Academy of Medicine Ordinance was enacted by the Legislative Council on 25 June 1992 and came into operation on 1 August 1992, formally establishing the Academy as Hong Kong's statutory authority for specialist medical and dental education and accreditation.
