= Philip Kam-tao Li =

Hong Kong nephrologist and the president of the Hong Kong Academy of Medicine

Philip Kam-tao Li is a Hong Kong nephrologist and academic physician. He is the President of the Hong Kong Academy of Medicine (HKAM) and the International Association of Chinese Nephrologists (IACN) and was the immediate past president of Hong Kong College of Physicians. He is the Senior Consultant Physician since 2020 in the Department of Medicine and Therapeutics of Prince of Wales Hospital, Hong Kong. He served as Deputy Hospital Chief Executive of Prince of Wales Hospital from 2002 to 2018. He is the Cluster Coordinator of Internal Medicine of the New Territories East Cluster of the Hospital Authority. He is Honorary professor of Medicine and Director of the Carol and Richard Yu Peritoneal Dialysis Research Centre of The Chinese University of Hong Kong (CUHK).

Li is internationally recognised for his role in establishing Hong Kong's Peritoneal Dialysis First policy and for authoring the International Society for Peritoneal Dialysis (ISPD) guidelines on peritonitis prevention and treatment. He is the recipient of the 2023 Belding H. Scribner Award from the American Society of Nephrology.

== Early life and education ==
Philip Kam-tao Li completed his medical degree (MBBS) at the University of Hong Kong in 1983. He subsequently undertook postgraduate physician training and obtained his Doctor of Medicine (MD) at The Chinese University of Hong Kong, where he was later awarded his Doctor of Science (D.Sc.) in the University of Hong Kong. He also obtained his MRCP and completed a research fellowship at Hammersmith Hospital, Royal Postgraduate Medical School, London.

Li is a Fellow of the Hong Kong Academy of Medicine in Medicine (FHKAM (Medicine)), the Hong Kong College of Physicians (FHKCP), the Royal College of Physicians of Edinburgh (FRCP (Edin)), the Royal College of Physicians of London (FRCP (Lond)), and the American College of Physicians (FACP). He is also an honorary Fellow of the Royal Australasian College of Physicians (FRACP (Hon)), and a Fellow of the Royal College of Physicians of Thailand (FRCPT) and the College of Physicians of Malaysia (FCoPM).

== Career ==
Li has spent the majority of his career at Prince of Wales Hospital, Hong Kong, and The Chinese University of Hong Kong. He served as Chief of Nephrology from 2002 to 2020 and has been the Senior Consultant Physician of the Department of Medicine and Therapeutics of Prince of Wales Hospital. He also holds the position of Honorary Professor of Medicine of CUHK and directs the Carol and Richard Yu Peritoneal Dialysis Research Centre, a research centre focused on kidney disease and dialysis at CUHK.

Li has been the Honorary Clinical Lecturer (since 1989) and the Honorary Associate Professor (since 1994) at the Department of Medicine of Prince of Wales Hospital of CUHK.

He teaches undergraduate medical students, postgraduate doctors, and nephrology trainees at Prince of Wales Hospital, and supervises the clinical training of training fellows and postgraduate students.

He has held visiting professorships at several academic institutions, including Harvard Medical School, Brown University, the University of Virginia, Nanjing University, Sun Yat-sen University, Fudan University, Peking University, Ningxia Medical University, Nagoya University, the University of Adelaide, and the Karolinska Institute.

=== Hong Kong Academy of Medicine ===
Li is the President of the Hong Kong Academy of Medicine (HKAM), the statutory body responsible for organising, monitoring, assessing, and accrediting specialist medical and dental postgraduate training, continuing medical education and continuous professional development in Hong Kong. Established by ordinance in 1993, the academy oversees the examinations and certification for specialist registration across its fifteen constituent Colleges. Li was elected president at the 31st Annual General Meeting on 6 December 2024 for the 2024–2026 term.

== Research ==
His research has focused on immunology, immunogenetics, peritoneal dialysis, IgA nephropathy, and kidney related disease.

=== Peritoneal dialysis and Hong Kong's PD First policy ===
Li's research has focused on peritoneal dialysis (PD) and the implementation of Hong Kong's PD First policy. Under the policy, patients with kidney failure are treated with peritoneal dialysis unless medically contraindicated. Hong Kong has one of the highest proportions of peritoneal dialysis patients in the world — approximately 75% of its dialysis population as of 2018.

Li has published on the outcomes, cost-effectiveness, and global implications of the PD First model. He served as President of the Organising Committee for the 11th Congress of the International Society for Peritoneal Dialysis (ISPD) in Hong Kong in 2006. He also authored an update in the Lancet Kidney Campaign entitled "Peritoneal Dialysis: Perspectives from Hong Kong, Asia Pacific and Beyond".

A paper, "Peritoneal Dialysis First Policy in Hong Kong for 35 Years: Global Impact", co-authored by Li and published in Nephrology in 2022. The paper highlighted Hong Kong's experience has influenced health policy and clinical practice across Asia-Pacific and beyond.

=== ISPD clinical guidelines ===
Li is the lead author of the International Society for Peritoneal Dialysis (ISPD) guidelines on peritoneal dialysis-related peritonitis, among widely cited clinical guidelines in the field of peritoneal dialysis. He has led the authorship of multiple editions of these guidelines, including the 2010, 2016, and 2022 updates, published in Peritoneal Dialysis International. The 2022 edition revised definitions for refractory and relapsing peritonitis, introduced new peritonitis categories, and set updated targets for peritonitis rates. Li also co-authored the companion 2023 ISPD guidelines on catheter-related infections.

== Awards and honours ==
Li has received a number of local and international awards recognising his contributions to nephrology:

- Sir David Todd Award, Hong Kong College of Physicians, 2001
- Richard Yu Endowment Award, Hong Kong Society of Nephrology, 2007
- Chief Executive's Commendation for Community Service, Hong Kong SAR Government, 2009
- International Distinguished Medal, National Kidney Foundation, 2012
- Fellow of the European Renal Association (FERA), 2013
- Priscilla Kincaid-Smith Award, Asian Pacific Society of Nephrology, 2020
- Oreopoulos Award, International Society for Peritoneal Dialysis, 2022
- Belding H. Scribner Award, American Society of Nephrology, 2023

== Publications ==
Li has published more than 670 original and review articles in peer-reviewed journals, 5 books, and has delivered over 300 invited lectures at international congresses, meetings, and academic institutions. His Web of Science H-index is 75.

Key publications include:

- Li PK, Chow KM (2013). "Peritoneal Dialysis–First Policy Made Successful: Perspectives and Actions". American Journal of Kidney Diseases. 62 (5): 993–1005. doi:10.1053/j.ajkd.2013.03.038. PMID 23751775.
- Li PK, Szeto CC (2008). "Success of the peritoneal dialysis programme in Hong Kong". Nephrology Dialysis Transplantation. 23 (5): 1475–1478. doi:10.1093/ndt/gfn068. PMID 18303111.
- Li PK, Lu W, Mak SK, Boudville N, Yu X, Wu MJ, Cheng YL, Chan CT, Goh BL, Tian N, Chow KM, Lui SL, Lo WK (2022). "Peritoneal dialysis first policy in Hong Kong for 35 years: Global impact". Nephrology. 27 (10): 787–794. doi:10.1111/nep.14042. PMC 9790333. PMID 35393750.
- Li PK, Chow KM, Cho Y, Fan S, Figueiredo AE, Harris T, Kanjanabuch T, Kim YL, Madero M, Malyszko J, Mehrotra R, Okpechi IG, Perl J, Piraino B, Runnegar N, Teitelbaum I, Wong JK, Yu X, Johnson DW (2022). "ISPD peritonitis guideline recommendations: 2022 update on prevention and treatment". Peritoneal Dialysis International. 42 (2): 110–153. doi:10.1177/08968608221080586. PMID 35264029.
- Li PK, Szeto CC, Piraino B, De Arteaga J, Fan S, Figueiredo AE, Fish DN, Goffin E, Kim YL, Salzer W, Struijk DG, Teitelbaum I, Johnson DW (2016). "ISPD Peritonitis Recommendations: 2016 Update on Prevention and Treatment". Peritoneal Dialysis International. 36 (5): 481–508. doi:10.3747/pdi.2016.00078. PMC 5033625. PMID 27282851.
- Li PK, Szeto CC, Piraino B, Bernardini J, Figueiredo AE, Gupta A, Johnson DW, Kuijper EJ, Lye WC, Salzer W, Schaefer F, Struijk DG, International Society for Peritoneal Dialysis (2010). "Peritoneal Dialysis-Related Infections Recommendations: 2010 Update". Peritoneal Dialysis International. 30 (4): 393–423. doi:10.3747/pdi.2010.00049. PMID 20628102.
