= Li Ka Chun =

Hong Kong footballer (born 1993)

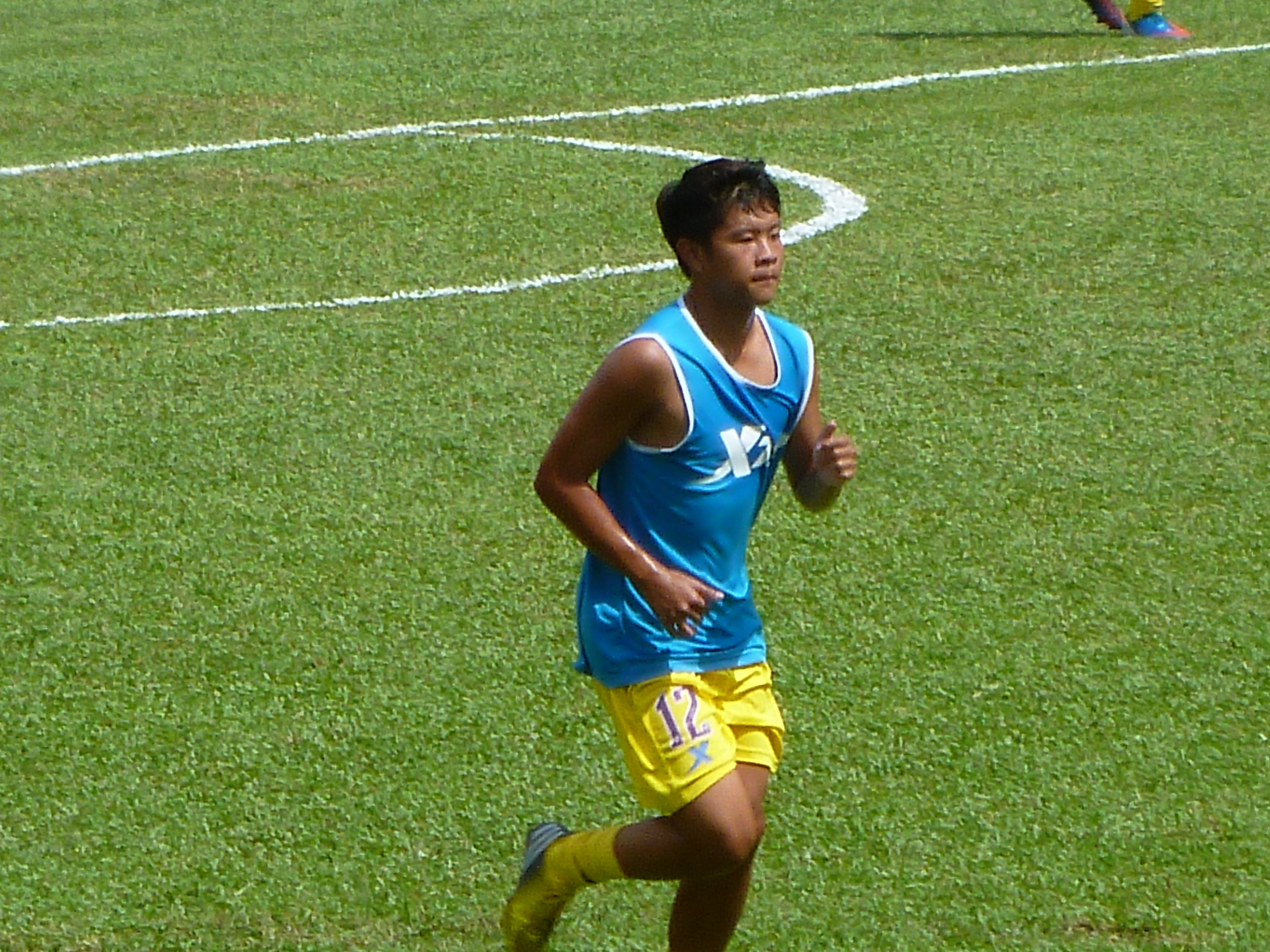
- Li warming up for Rangers

Personal information
- Full name: Li Ka Chun
- Date of birth: 10 September 1993 (age 33)
- Place of birth: Hong Kong
- Height: 1.69 m (5 ft 7 in)
- Position: Midfielder

Team information
- Current team: Metro Gallery

Youth career
- 2006–2010: Kitchee

Senior career*
Years	Team	Apps	(Gls)
2010–2012	Kitchee	0	(0)
2011–2012	→ Pegasus (loan)	4	(0)
2012–2014	Rangers (HKG)	9	(0)
2014–2017	Eastern	2	(1)
2014–2015	→ Tai Po (loan)	5	(1)
2015–2016	→ Metro Gallery (loan)	10	(0)
2017–2018	Dreams	9	(0)
2018–2019	Eastern District	27	(5)
2020	→ Wong Tai Sin (loan)	2	(0)
2020	Metro Gallery	0	(0)
2020–2024	Eastern District	61	(12)
2024–2025	Central & Western	16	(2)
2025–	Kui Tan	16	(4)

International career
2011	Hong Kong U19	1	(0)
2011	Hong Kong U23	1	(0)
- * Club domestic league appearances and goals as of 17 May 2026

Li Ka Chun (Chinese: 李嘉進; born 10 September 1993), nicknamed Lali, is a former Hong Kong professional footballer.

== Club career ==
Born in Hong Kong during British reign, Li was spotted by Kitchee as a 13 year old during a youth football development programme he was attending during the summer. He progressed well through the youth ranks, earning places in the Hong Kong national youth setup, and a trial with then-Premier League side Birmingham City in 2010. In July of the same year, along with fellow Kitchee teammate Ngan Lok Fung, he traveled to Spain to participate in youth training events organised by Tercera División side CF Amposta, the former club of his then-manager, Josep Gombau.

In June 2011, he was loaned to Pegasus (at the time known as TSW Pegasus FC), who were also competing in the First Division, the top level of football in Hong Kong before the introduction of the Premier League in 2014. In October 2011, he scored his first goal in the Senior Shield, the fifth of a 5–0 win over the Rangers.

In July 2012, he returned to Rangers. However, after two seasons without fully breaking into the first team, he left for Eastern in June 2014. Only two months later, he was sent out on loan to Tai Po. He scored his first goal in the Premier League on 4 October, in a 1–2 defeat by Yuen Long.

In July 2015, having been demoted to Eastern's reserve team, he joined Metro Gallery on loan. He scored his first goal in the Sapling Cup, a consolation in a 1–3 defeat by South China.

Li returned to Eastern ahead of the 2016–17 season and was given the number 18 shirt. He made his debut for Eastern in a 7–0 victory over HKFC, providing an assist for teammate Lee Hong Lim. On 12 February, he scored his first goal for the club, the sixth of a 7–1 victory over R&F FC in the Sapling Cup. He scored against the same opposition in his second league game on 5 March; the fourth goal in a 4–0 victory. On 11 July 2017, it was revealed that Li's contract with Eastern was not renewed.

On 26 July 2017, Dreams confirmed that they had signed Li.

On 13 May 2018, Li captained Dreams on his final match of his career, having previously announced his retirement at the end of the season.

== Personal life ==
As well as football, Li also acts, and played a supporting role in a stage performance of Tin Hong's The Love Story on Gentlemen Street, organised by his club, Eastern.
