= Lo Hin-shing =

Magistrate of Hong Kong (1889–1989)

Lo Hin-shing MBE, JP
- 羅顯勝
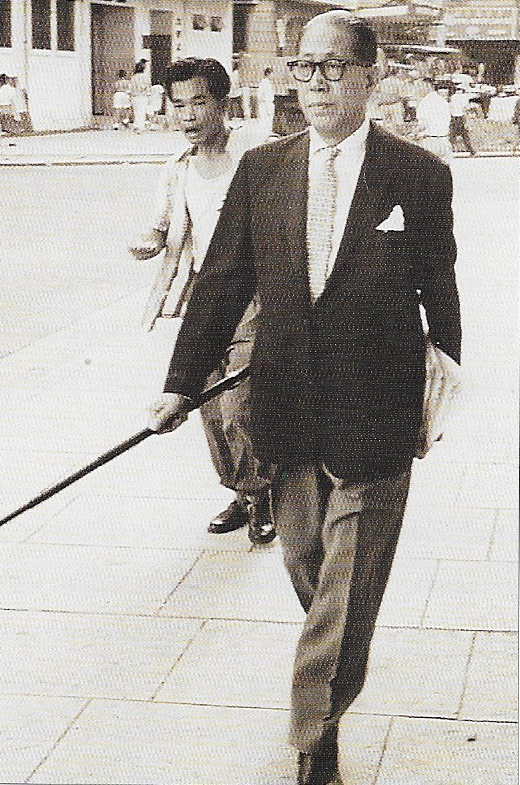

Magistrate at the Causeway Bay Magistracy
- In office April 1964 – March 1970

Principal Magistrate at the Central Magistracy
- In office 1952–1959

Magistrate at the Central Magistracy
- In office April 1948 – 1952
- Appointed by: Sir Alexander Grantham

Personal details
- Born: 1889 Hong Kong
- Died: 2 January 1989 (aged 100) Hong Kong
- Resting place: Chinese Christian Cemetery, Pokfulam
- Education: Queen's College; University of Hong Kong (BA); University of Cambridge (MA)
- Occupation: Barrister-at-law; Magistrate

Lo Hin-shing (Chinese: 羅顯勝; 1889 – 2 January 1989) was a barrister and magistrate of Hong Kong. Educated in China, Hong Kong and Cambridge, he was called to the English and Hong Kong bar in the 1920s. During the Japanese occupation of Hong Kong, he was obliged by the Japanese authority to give his opinion on matters of English law. After the World War II, he became one of the first Chinese to be appointed as magistrate. His magisterial life spanned some 17 years until his final retirement in 1970.

== Early life and studies ==
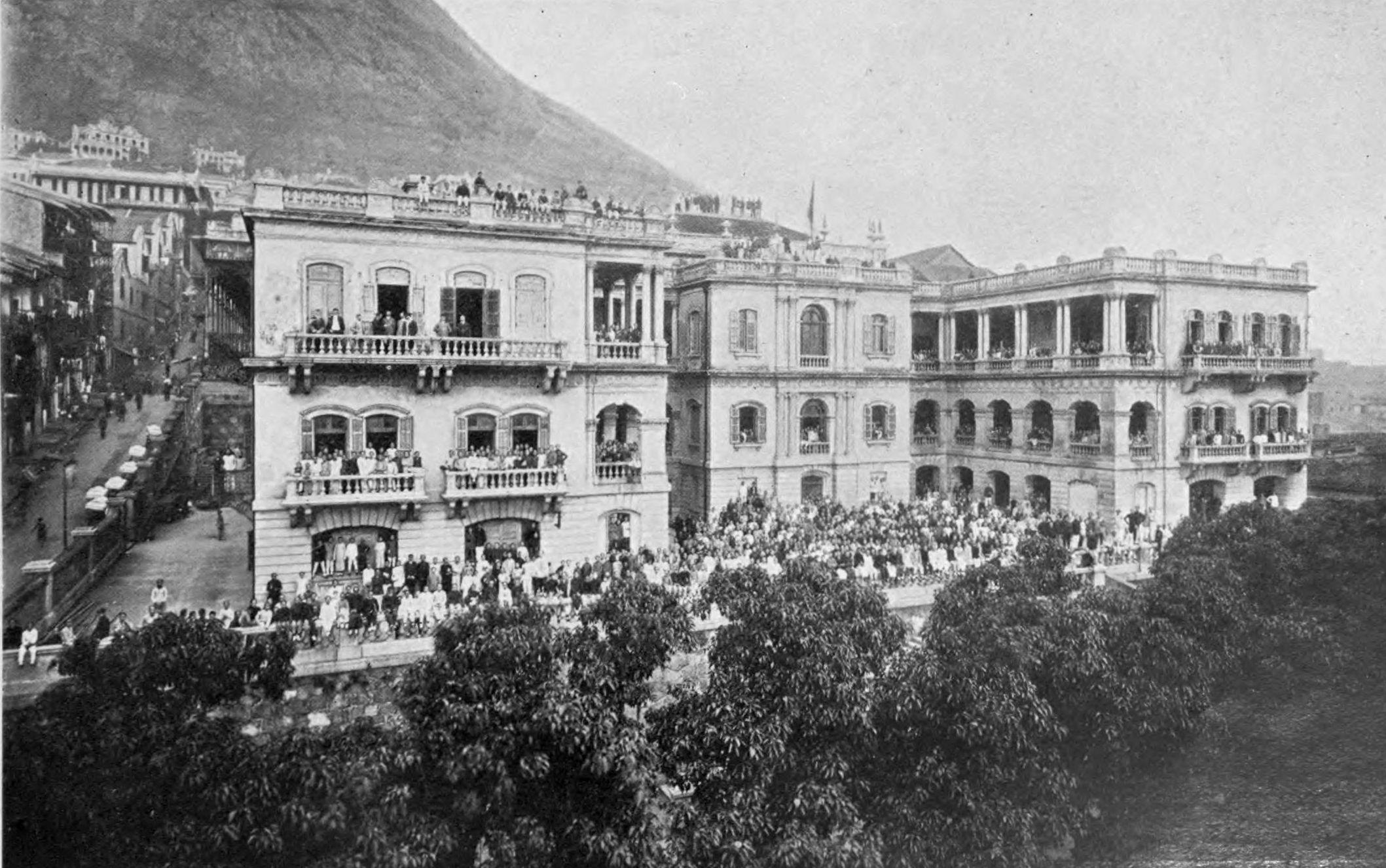
Queen's College, a photograph from 1908

Lo Hin-shing was born in Hong Kong in 1889. His ancestral village was in Taishan in Guangdong Province of China, to which he was sent at the age of 5 to receive classical Chinese education in the ancestral halls.^{:1–7} In 1905, at the age of 16, he returned to Hong Kong to study English at Queen's College, the prestigious government central school. Lo was appointed Head Prefect in 1912. He also frequently contributed essays to The Yellow Dragon, the school's magazine.^{:8–9}

Lo was admitted to the newly-opened University of Hong Kong in October 1912 as an Arts student. In 1918, he took the BA degree in History, Political Economy, Public Finance and Administration and Public International Law.^{:10–11} As an undergraduate he resided at St. John's Hall, an Anglican hostel established by the Church Missionary Society. For 3 years, he taught History and English at St. Stephen's College on the invitation of the Hall's warden, the Rev. William Hewitt.^{:11} Lo was also elected Chairman of the Hong Kong University Union in 1915.

In 1919, Lo was admitted to Trinity Hall, Cambridge to study law. In 1922, Lo passed the Bar final examinations. On 26 June 1923, he was called to the English Bar at Inner Temple under the sponsorship of Sir Edward Clarke KC and Mr. Travers Humphreys. He took his MA at Cambridge in October 1925. During his years at Cambridge he was the president of the Chinese Students’ Union.^{:12–13}

== Hong Kong bar ==
Since his early days, Lo had always wanted to devote himself to the service of the Republic of China. The 1925 strike in Hong Kong, and the subsequent strained relations between Britain and China, frustrated his plan. Affected by the strike, he returned to Hong Kong in February 1926 to practise criminal law.^{:15} On 11 March 1926, Lo was admitted to the Hong Kong bar. Lo had soon established success in his career. In a famous case of the trial of 13 pirates from Bias Bay (R v Chung Tam Kwong), Lo successfully defended the prisoners on appeal which spared them from death sentence.^{:15}

Lo was also well read in Chinese laws and customs. Since 1926, the Supreme Court of Hong Kong recognised him as an expert on Chinese laws and customs, in which capacity he frequently gave written opinions on Chinese law not just in Hong Kong, but also in Australia and Mainland China.^{:17}

He also devoted himself to public service. From 1937 to 1939 he was a director of the Tung Wah Group of Hospitals. After the second world war, he was appointed by Governor Alexander Grantham as the First Chairman of the tenancy court to hear disputes under the Landlord and Tenant Ordinance.^{:17}

In 1960, Lo became the first local lawyer to serve as chairman of the Hong Kong Bar Association.

== Japanese occupation ==
During the Japanese occupation, an Association of Lawyers was formed under the direction of the Japanese authority. The association consisted of 11 local legal practitioners, 2 Chinese lawyers and 1 Taiwan scholar. Lo was elected chairman. The other local lawyers included Mr. P. C. Woo, Mr. Peter Sin, Mr. Lee Hon Chi, Mr. Alfred Hon, Sir M. K. Lo, Mr. M. W. Lo and Mr. George She.^{:18}

The association would meet the Japanese judge once a week, who would explain certain aspects of Japanese law to members in exchange for information about some aspects of English law. The Japanese Judiciary also requested members to write papers on legal subjects of their own choice. At other times, the lawyers’ practice under the Japanese occupation was restricted to conveyancing and a few civil suits, with criminal cases completely out of scope.^{:18–19}

== The bench ==
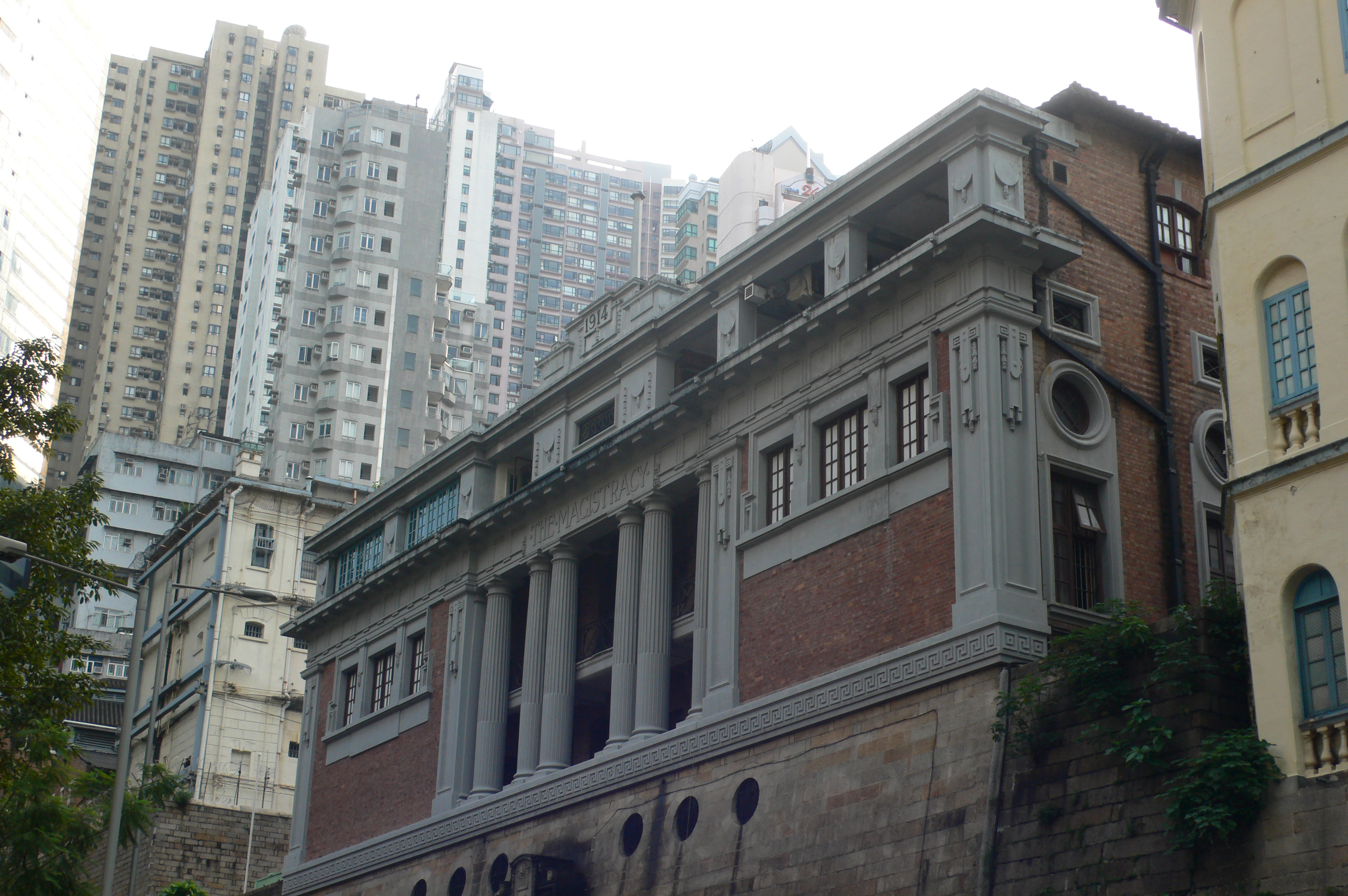
The Former Central Magistracy

Lo started his life on the bench in April 1948, when Governor Alexander Grantham appointed him as a magistrate sitting at the Central Magistracy. He was legendary for being one of the first Chinese magistrates in Hong Kong. He became First Magistrate (or Principal Magistrate) in 1952, a position which imposed on him many administrative work in addition to his judicial work.^{:Foreword}

In 1959, Lo retired from the Bench and returned to private practice. In April 1964, on the invitation of the Chief Justice, Sir Michael Hogan, Lo returned to the Bench and sat at the Causeway Bay Magistracy (Chinese: 銅鑼灣裁判司署) until 1970, when he finally retired on the eve of his 80th birthday.^{:21–27}

Lo was well regarded as a magistrate. He was particularly respected for his kindness and compassion for the underprivileged. He was said to have “always tried to give the benefit of the doubt to the underdog”. On occasion he had also helped hawkers paid their fines out of his own pocket.

On the occasion of his first retirement in 1959, Chief Justice Hogan wrote the following in a valedictory letter:^{:21–22}

You brought to the magisterial bench a long experience of the affairs of this territory, a deep understanding of the community and a wide knowledge of the culture and ideals that have given it so unique a character. We have great reason to be grateful to you for the manner in which you have used your knowledge on the Bench and you will be greatly missed, not only by your colleagues, but by all those who have come into contact with you during the course of your service and by the general public of Hong Kong. Your understanding of their difficulties and the sympathy and humanity, which you have brought to their problems have done much to maintain their regard for the administrators of justice.

Lo was also noted for his good sense of humour, for which he was well liked by lawyers.

== Passing ==
Lo died at the age of 100 on 2 January 1989.

== Personal life and beliefs ==
Lo was married and had two sons (Kenneth Lo Kwong-ki and Clement Lo Kwong-chi) and a daughter (Helen Lo Hoi-lun, also Lo Helen Andrene). His daughter was also a judge in Hong Kong, and died in 1988.

He was a keen racing fan and a voting member of the Royal Hong Kong Jockey Club.

In his memoirs, Lo argued for keeping death penalty on the statute book of Hong Kong, so that an "extremely wicked and atrocious condemnes murderer" can be hanged at the Governor's discretion and with the advice of the Executive Council. He distinguished such a man from one who commits a murder under a loss of control or the influence of an unbalanced mind, who should not be hanged lest "creating a vicious cycle contrary to humanity".^{:34–35}

== Honours ==
Lo was made a justice of the peace in the late 1940s.^{:21}

He was made an MBE in December 1975 for public services in Hong Kong.
