= St. John's College, University of Hong Kong =

Residential college of University of Hong Kong

St. John's College
- 聖約翰學院
- University of Hong Kong
- Aquila, the Emblem of St. John's College
- Location: 82 Pokfulam Road, Hong Kong
- Coordinates: 22°16′50″N 114°07′55″E
- Full name: The College of St. John the Evangelist
- Motto: ΠΑΝΤΑ ΔΙ ΑΥΤΟΥ (Greek)
- Motto in English: All Through Him
- Established: 1912 (St. John's Hall); 1922 (St. Stephen's Hall); 1955 (St. John's College)
- Named for: John the Evangelist
- Former names: St. John's Hall / St. Stephen's Hall (until amalgamation in 1955)
- Colours: Purple (symbolising "Royalty and Loyalty")
- Gender: Co-educational
- President: The Most Rev. Andrew Chan Au-ming
- Master: Dr. Wong Kwok Chun
- Assistant Master: Mr. Paul Lee Tin Fan
- Undergraduates: 223
- Postgraduates: 111
- Chapel: Chapel of Epiphany
- Website: www.stjohns.hk

St. John's College, University of Hong Kong
- Traditional Chinese: 聖約翰學院
- Simplified Chinese: 圣约翰学院
Transcriptions
Standard Mandarin
- Hanyu Pinyin: Shèng Yuēhàn Xuéyuàn
Yue: Cantonese
- Yale Romanization: Sing yeuk hohn hohk yún
- Jyutping: Sing3 joek3 hon6 hok6 jyun2

St. John’s College is an Anglican college affiliated with the University of Hong Kong, which provides accommodation to undergraduates and postgraduates. As the successor of St. John’s Hall, which was founded in 1912, the College is the oldest residential hall/college of the University. Constitutionally, the College is a body corporate established by statute, the St. John’s College Ordinance (Chapter 1089, Laws of Hong Kong), on 27 April 1956. As such, unlike other residential halls/colleges that are directly administered by the University, the College enjoys financial and administrative independence. The Ricci Hall, run by the Jesuits, is the only other non-University-administered hall.

The aims of the College, as specified in the Preamble of the St. John’s College Ordinance, are "the pursuit of virtue and sound learning with faith in God and within the order of the Anglican Communion; and to this end to provide accommodation for teachers and students of all races where they may live, study and worship together; and to promote extramural activities in Christian learning and service, that the members of the College may the better understand and fulfil their duty to God and their neighbours".

The incumbent President of St. John's College Council is The Most Rev. Andrew Chan Au-ming, Archbishop and Primate of the Hong Kong Sheng Kung Hui. The Master of College is Dr. Wong Kwok Chun, Associate Professor in the Department of Real Estate of HKU.

== History ==
=== Origin of residential education ===
In January 1908, Governor Lugard alluded to the scheme of establishing HKU at the prize-giving of St. Stephen’s College, a boarding school run by the Church Missionary Society (CMS) for the sons of Chinese gentry. Shortly afterwards, Sir Mody offered to contribute to the university’s building costs, and work had been swiftly undertaken to consider and prepare for the scheme. Already then a committee convened by the Governor had decided that the objects of HKU must include the development and formation of "the character of students no less than their intellectual faculties". In a memorandum dated 20 March 1910, Governor Lugard elaborated on this point:

It has been said that the Hongkong University aims at giving a purely secular education…, and that it will provide for the material and intellectual development only, while neglecting the training of character and morals. Were this the case I at any rate would not have given my cordial support to the project… in order to ensure discipline and moral education it has been decided that no external students shall be accepted unless they live in Hostels conducted under strict regulations framed by the Council. Such Hostels will consist exclusively of establishments founded and conducted by Religious bodies who desire to maintain supervision, during their career at the University, over the pupils whom they have educated in their schools. All others will be required to reside within the precincts under the close supervision of the Staff, and we hope, by engaging men of the right stamp and not mere educationalists, to thus bring the best influences to bear on the Undergraduates.

=== Founding of St. John’s Hall ===
Against this background, the CMS made plans to build an Anglican hostel. Their appeal for funds was supported by Governor Lugard, who looked to the CMS for continuing "its care and discipline of its own students".

The question of providing a CMS hostel was officially raised at the Church Conference of the Diocese in September 1910 by Bishop Lander, who considered the scheme "a challenge to our Church that we must not decline". At that time, the CMS possessed a site directly opposite to the proposed university, which housed the CMS Girls’ School, known as "Fairlea" (established 1886). It was decided that the CMS hostel would be erected there and the Girls’ School would be moved elsewhere. Fairlea was eventually moved to Prospect Terence, and later to Lyttelton Road, where it shared a campus with St. Stephen's Girls' College until 1936, when Fairlea amalgamated with Victoria School to form Heep Yunn School.

The work of adapting the site and securing funds was conducted under the direction of Archdeacon E. J. Barnett, who was the warden (the equivalent of "principal") of St. Stephen’s College from 1903 to 1913. The Diocese of Liverpool "did much to make accomplishment possible". The old Fairlea building was adapted for residence, while a new building was erected to its East by Messrs. Denison, Ram and Gibbs. Rev. W. H. Hewitt, Chaplain of St. Stephen’s College, was the warden-elect. He and Archdeacon Barnett together drew up the constitution and regulations of St. John’s Hall and the university hostels.

When the university formally opened in September 1912, St. John’s Hall was the only hostel ready for occupation. Those to follow were: Lugard Hall (1913), Morrison Hall (1913), Eliot Hall (1914) and May Hall (1915). In the first term, 33 students were admitted to St. John’s Hall, 23 of whom were old boys of St. Stephen’s College. Those admitted to the "University Hall" (a temporary name for the secular hostels – Lugard, Eliot and May) were temporarily accommodated in the University Main Building.

== Wardens and Masters ==
=== Wardens of St. John's Hall (1912-1955) ===
№	Portrait	Name Chinese name (Birth–Death)	Tenure	Remarks
1.		Rev. William Herbert Hewitt, M.A., B.D. 侯活牧師 (1884-1955)	1912-1914	Arrived in Hong Kong in 1908 as Chaplain of St. Stephen's College. Assisted HKU in drawing up the hall regulations. Went on furlough in 1914, and when he returned in 1915, he was transferred to St. Stephen's College as Warden (the equivalent of Principal), a position he held for 13 years till 1928.
Acting		Herbert Westren Turnbull, Esq., M.A. (1885-1961)	1914-1915	Lecturer in Mathematics at HKU. Turnbull had been assisting Rev. Hewitt since 1912, and when Hewitt went on furlough, he became Acting Warden, assisted by Mr. F. A. Britton. He was also Master at St. Stephen's College. In spring 1915 Turnbull was ordered home by his doctor due to ill health. A distinguished mathematician, who was elected Fellow of the Royal Society in 1932.
Acting		F. A. Britton, Esq., M.A. (?-?)	1914-1915	Teacher at St. Stephen's College.
2.		Rev. Charles Brodie Shann, M.A. 沈悟牧師 (1885-1960)	1915-1931	
Acting		Rev. Ernest William Lunn Martin, M.A. 馬田牧師 (1889-1980)	1916-1917, 1920-1921, 1925-1926	Arrived in Hong Kong in 1914 as Chaplain of St. Stephen's College. Thrice took charge of St. John's Hall as Acting Warden, when Rev. Shann went on furlough. Married Kathleen Stewart, sister of Rev. A. D. Stewart and founder of St. Paul's Girls' School. Appointed Acting Warden and Warden of St. Stephen's College in 1926 and 1928 respectively, having held the latter position for 25 years till 1953. Defended St. Stephen's College during the Battle of Hong Kong, and lost his wife during their time at the Stanley Internment Camp. Returned to St. John's College in 1956 as Chaplain, a position he held until his death in 1980. Married a second time in 1970 to Mei Ling Martin. Made an MBE for his educational and welfare services to the community in Hong Kong.
Acting		Rev. Harry August Wittenbach (?-?)	1926-1927	
3.		Rev. George Kingsford Carpenter, M.A., Sc.M., A.I.C. 賈炳達牧師 (1897-1970)	1932-1938	
Acting		T. J. Price, Esq. (?-?)	1933	
4.		George Samuel Zimmern, Esq., M.A. 施玉麒牧師 (1904-1979)	1939-1941	
Hall closed during Japanese Occupation (1941-1945)
4.		Canon George Samuel Zimmern, M.A., J.P. 施玉麒牧師 (1904-1979)	1946-1952	
5.		Rev. Erik Kvan, Cand. Theol. 關愛睿牧師 (1917-2003)	1952-1955	

=== Subwardens of St. John's Hall (1912-1955) ===
№	Portrait	Name Chinese name (Birth–Death)	Tenure	Remarks
1.		Herbert Westren Turnbull, Esq., M.A. (1885-1961)	1912-1914	See above.
2.		Rev. J. Romanis Lee, M.A. (?-?)	1922-1925	Lecturer in History at HKU.
3.		Rev. Nelson Victor Halward, M.C., M.A. 侯利華牧師 (1897-1953)	1925-1926, 1927-1933	Arrived in Hong Kong in 1925 as Diocesan Chaplain of the Anglican Church. He was also the scoutmaster of St. Paul's College. Colony Commissioner of the Boy Scout Association, Hong Kong Branch from 1934 to 1950. During his tenure, the scout movement rooted among the Hong Kong Chinese population. Appointed Assistant Bishop of Victoria in 1946 till 1951.
4.		Dr. K. D. Ling (?-?)	1933	
5.		G. H. Owen, Esq. (?-?)	1934-1938	
6.		Davide T. C. Cheng, Esq. (?-?)	1939-1941	
6.		Rev. S. K. Cheung (?-?)	1939-1941	
7.		Rev. S. K. Loong 龍韶基牧師 (?-?)	1946-1952	

=== Wardens of St. Stephen's Hall (1922-1955) ===
№	Portrait	Name Chinese name (Birth–Death)	Tenure	Remarks
1.		Ms. Edna Sabrina Atkins 歐鏡新女士 (?-?)	1922-1926	Taught at St. Stephen's Girls' College since 1919. Headmistress of the Girls' College from 1929 to 1949. Noted for welcoming the less privileged, organising free school for street children and introducing "cheongsam" school uniform.
Acting		Ms. Janet Lucy Vincent (?-?)	1926-1927	Taught at St. Stephen's Girls' College from 1924 to 1931.
2.		Ms. Winifred Ida Griffin 龍女士 (?-?)	1928-1936	Taught at St. Stephen's Girls' College since 1910. Headmistress of the Girls' College from 1915 to 1921. Assigned to St. Hilda's Girls' School, Guangzhou from 1921 to 1927.
3.		Ms. Mary Noel Baxter 伯斯特女士 (?-?)	1936-1941	Taught at St. Stephen's Girls' College since 1921. Became Acting Warden in 1936 when Ms. Griffin went on leave, and later became the third Warden. During the Japanese occupation, Ms. Baxter was interned at Stanley together with the Headmistress Ms. Atkins; both taught at the Camp School. Shortly after the liberation, she was already working with Ms. Atkins to reopen St. Stephen's Girls' College, only leaving for England for recuperation in October, but thereafter prevented from returning by illness.
Hall closed during Japanese Occupation (1941-1945)
4.		Ms. Ada Chung 鐘梁毅德女士 (?-?)	1945-1955	Graduate of St. Stephen's Girls' College (1926) and HKU (BA in Science 1932). Briefly taught at the Girls' College. Became Demonstrator in Chemistry at HKU in 1936. She reopened St. Stephen's Hall after the war and became its first Chinese Warden. Awarded M.Sc. and became Assistant Lecturer at HKU in 1955.

=== Masters of St. John's College (1955-present) ===
№	Portrait	Name Chinese name (Birth–Death)	Tenure	Remarks
1.		Rev. Erik Kvan, Cand. Theol. 關愛睿牧師 (1917-2003)	1955-1967	From 1952 to 1960 he taught Psychology at the University on a part-time basis and he became a full-time lecturer in 1961, being promoted to senior lecturer in Psychology four years later. From 1976 until 1980 he was the University's Head of the Department of Psychology and in 1968 he was elected Dean of the Faculty of Social Sciences and Law, a post he held until 1974. He was chairman of the Mental Health Association, the Boys' and Girls' Clubs Association and the Spastics Association, in addition to being a member of the Executive Committee of the Hong Kong Council of Social Service. Awarded Doctor of Social Sciences honoris causa in 1992 by HKU.
2.		Rev. Paul Gibson, B.A., L.Th. 葉生葡牧師 (?-?)	1967-1972	Principal of the Union Theological College since 1968. Left Hong Kong for Canada and became the liturgist of the Canadian Anglican Church for 20 years.
3.		Mr. Henry Talbot, B.Sc. 托拔先生 (?-?)	1972-1973	Lecturer in the Department of Geography and Geology of HKU.
4.		Rev. Paul Tong Hin Sum, B.A., S.T.M. 湯顯森牧師 (?-present)	1973-1985	
5.		Rev. Ian Lam, B.A., M.Div., S.T.M. 林壽楓牧師 (?-present)	1985-1987	
6.		Mr. Frederick Leung Koon Shing, B.Sc., M.Ed., Dip.Ed. 梁貫成先生 (?-present)	1987-1990	
7.		Rev. Paul Tong Hin Sum, B.A., M.A., S.T.M., P.C.L.L. 湯顯森牧師 (?-present)	1990-2008	
8.		Rev. Canon Dr. Eric Chong Chee Min, B.Sc., B.Div., M.Th., M.So.Sc., M.Phil., Ph.D. 張志明法政牧師博士 (?-present)	2008–2022	
9.		Dr. Wong Kwok Chun, B.Sc., B.Building., Ph.D., M.R.I.C.S., M.H.K.I.S. 黃國俊博士 (?-present)	2022–present	Associate Professor in the Department of Real Estate of HKU

== College Mission ==
The mission of St. John's College is three-fold:

1. To foster St. Johnians to have all-round and distinguished character.
2. To make St. Johnians zealous for the College and society.
3. To encourage St. Johnians to become a lifelong member of the College fraternity and community.

== Collegiate System ==
St. John’s College is the only residential college for undergraduate students out of the two colleges in the University of Hong Kong. Tutors offer pastoral as well as academic counselling for students.

=== High Table Dinner ===
Adopting the tradition of Oxbridge colleges, the College hosts weekly High Table Dinners, where all members of the College congregate in formal dress and academic gowns. Prominent alumni are often invited to share their experience with students after dinner during High Table Talks.

=== Sherry Group ===
Students have the opportunity to interact with tutors and visiting scholars in an informal setting before High Table Dinner every week.

== Buildings ==
=== Marden Wing ===
The Marden Wing provides single-bedroom accommodation for undergraduates. Facilities include the Common Room and College Bar.

=== Aw Boon Haw Wing ===
The Aw Boon Haw Wing provides single-bedroom accommodation for undergraduates, tutors and fellows of the College.

=== Liang Chi Hao Centre ===
Liang Chi Hao Centre contains the Lee Foundation Library, Senior Common Room, Bradbury Hall and Chapel. All meals, including weekly High Table Dinners, take place in the 3,000 square feet (280 m^{2}) Dining Hall (Bradbury Hall), which is situated on the third floor. Regular services are held in the College Chapel.

=== Wong Chik Ting Hall ===
Wong Chik Ting Hall, also known as the Third Wing, or the Postgraduate Wing, provides 111 en-suite accommodation for postgraduate and visiting scholars.

== College life ==
The college aims to promote all-round development and holistic growth through encouraging active participation in various sports and cultural activities.

=== Sports ===
The college has a rich sporting history, with particular emphasis on education through "new ball games".

New ball games are team sports that offer a unique learning experience distinct from mainstream sports. As players generally have no prior experience of such sports, they start on a level playing field and gradually develop skills and camaraderie. Teams include:

- Hockey (Men and Ladies)
- Softball (Men and Ladies)
- Lacrosse (Men)
- Handball (Ladies)

Other sports teams include athletics, aquatics, badminton, basketball, soccer, squash, table tennis, tennis and volleyball.
The College has consistently attained outstanding performance in various inter-hall competitions:

- Men’s Inter-Hall Sports Competition Championship
  - The College won the Malayan Cup in 1960, 1961, 1962, 1970, 1977, 1985, 1992, 1996, 1999, 2000, 2001, 2002, 2003, 2009, 2010, 2011, 2012 and 2013.
- Ladies’ Inter-Hall Sports Competition Championship
  - The College won the Omega Rose Bowl in 1967, 1968, 1970, 1971, 1973, 1977, 1978, 1979, 1980, 1981, 1982, 1983, 1984, 1986, 1987, 1988, 1989, 1990, 1991, 1992, 1993 and 1994.
  - The Bowl was later renamed the Olma Challenge Rose Bowl and was won by the College in 1995, 1996, 1998, 1999, 2000, 2001, 2002, 2003, 2004, 2008, 2012 and 2014.

=== Cultural Activities ===
Cultural teams include band, bridge, choir, dance, debate and drama. The Prof. Y. C. Cheng Cup was established in 1997 as an award for the Champion of Inter-Hall Cultural Competitions. The College won the Cup in 1999, 2005, 2009, 2010, 2013 and 2014.

=== Round the Island (RTI) ===
Currently in its 30th year, RTI is an annual event where participants run a total of 38 km around Hong Kong Island. Since 2004, RTI has been used as a fundraising event for various charitable organizations.

== Floor Culture ==
The College occupies ten floors, each represented by a floor association. Throughout the years, each floor has developed their own unique culture and fostered strong bonds of brotherhood and sisterhood.

- 1/F - Home of the Adventurers
- 2/F - 梁山泊
- 3/F - The Magnificent Musketeers
- 4/F - House of Lords
- 5/F - Fifth Floor Fraternity
- 6/F - Sixth Floor Association
- 7/F - Elysium
- 8/F - Florence Heights
- 9/F - Kew Gardens
- 10/F - Liberata

== Admissions ==
The College is a non-university administered hall and thus does not participate in the Joint Hall Admission Scheme. Applicants apply directly to the College and may be invited to attend an interview for the College to assess the merits of the application. The College considers applicants’ potential to make the most out of their university hall experience and commuting distance is not a factor in the admission process.

== Notable alumni ==
St. John’s College Alumni Association, The University of Hong Kong, Ltd. was founded in 1991 as a means of fostering contact between alumni across different generations. Over the years, the association has established itself as one of the most respected alumni bodies within the University community. The Alumni Association has been actively involved in student development and mentorship programmes, facilitating exchange between past and current St. Johnians.

=== Academics and educationalists ===
- Prof. Johannes Chan (陳文敏), Professor of Law at the University of Hong Kong and Dean of the Law Faculty (2002-2014)
- Prof. Albert Chen (陳弘毅), Professor of Law at the University of Hong Kong and Dean of the Law Faculty (1996-2002)
- Dr. Rayson Huang (黃麗松), Vice-Chancellor of the University of Hong Kong (1972–1986)
- Prof. Poon Chung Kwong (潘宗光), President of the Hong Kong Polytechnic University (1991–2008)
- Dr. Siu Yum Tong (蕭蔭堂), Professor of Mathematics at Harvard University
- Dr. James Yen (晏陽初), founder of the Chinese mass education movement and the International Institute of Rural Reconstruction

=== Armed forces ===
- Major-General Lim Bo Seng (林謀盛), Commander of Force 136 (1942-1944)

=== Arts ===
- Lin Xi (林夕), lyricist
- Tin Hong (天航), novelist

=== Diplomats ===
- Dr. Fu Bingchang (傅秉常), Chinese Ambassador to the USSR (1943-1949)

=== Government and politics ===
- Sir Chau Sik-nin (周錫年), Unofficial Member of the Legislative Council (1946-1959) and Executive Council (1948-1962)
- Dr. York Chow (周一嶽), Secretary for Food and Health (2007-2012) and Chairman of the Equal Opportunities Commission (2013-2016)
- Kwok Chan (郭贊), Unofficial Member of the Legislative Council (1953-1962)
- Sir Fung Ping Fan (馮秉芬), Unofficial Member of the Legislative Council (1959-1965) and Executive Council (1962-1972)
- Alan Lai (黎年), Commissioner of the Independent Commission Against Corruption (1999-2002) and Ombudsman (2009-2014)
- Lee Cheuk-yan (李卓人), Legislative Council member (1998-2016)
- Antony Leung (梁錦松), Financial Secretary (2001-2003)
- Andrew Liao (廖長城), Executive Councillor (2002-2017)
- Dr. Sarah Liao (廖秀冬), Secretary for the Environment, Transport and Works (2002-2007)
- Frederick Ma (馬時亨), Secretary for Financial Services and the Treasury (2002-2007), Chairman of the MTR Corporation (2015- )
- Fanny Law (羅范椒芬), Permanent Secretary for Education and Manpower (2002-2006)
- Elizabeth Wong (黃錢其濂), civil servant
- Dr. Yeung Sum (楊森), Legislative Council member (1998-2008)
- Rimsky Yuen (袁國強), Secretary for Justice (2012-2018)

=== Lawyers and judges ===
- Lo Hin Shing (羅顯勝), magistrate (1948-1959, 1964-1970)
- Sir Yang Ti-liang (楊鐵樑), Chief Justice (1988-1996)
- Wally Yeung Chun-kuen (楊振權), Vice-President of the Court of Appeal (2011-2021)

=== NGOs ===
- Dr. Dame Rosanna Wong (王䓪鳴), Executive Director of the Hong Kong Federation of Youth Groups (1980-2017)

=== Religion ===
- The Rev. Dr. Lü Chen Chung (呂振中), priest and bible translator

== See also ==
- University of Hong Kong
- Education in Hong Kong
