= Andrew Ling =

Hong Kong violist, conductor and educator

- 凌顯祐
- Born: Hong Kong, China
- Education: Jacobs School of Music; Rice University
- Occupations: Violist; violinist; conductor; music educator
- Employers: Hong Kong Baptist University; Hong Kong Academy for Performing Arts
- Style: Classical

Andrew Ling (Chinese: 凌顯祐) is a Hong Kong violist, violinist, conductor and music educator. As of 2015, he has been the principal violist of the Hong Kong Philharmonic Orchestra, a position he has held since 2010. He has performed solo performances with the Hong Kong Philharmonic Orchestra to critical acclaim. In the past, he had assumed the role of concertmaster at the Indiana University (IU) Concert Orchestra and the Terre Haute Symphony Orchestra.

== Education ==
Ling began studying violin at the age of six under the tutelage of Professor Lin Yaoji of the Central Conservatory of Music, Beijing. He then went to study at the Diocesan Boys' School, Hong Kong. He completed his undergraduate and graduate studies at the Jacobs School of Music at Indiana University Bloomington, and has studied at Rice University in Houston. He studied with Henryk Kowalski, Ik-Hwan Bae, Alan de Veritch and Cho-liang Lin.

== Career ==
As a child, Ling toured the world as a violin soloist. He has collaborated with the Hong Kong Philharmonic Orchestra, the Hong Kong Chinese Orchestra and the China Film Philharmonic Orchestra, and has given recitals in Hong Kong, North America and Europe.

He is an active chamber musician, having performed with Cho-liang Lin, Jaime Laredo, Trey Lee and the Shanghai String Quartet, and was invited as a guest artist to the Chamber Residency at the Banff Centre in Canada and at the Hong Kong International Chamber Music Festival.

A dedicated music educator, Ling has directed the Robert H. N. Ho Family Foundation Orchestral Fellowship Scheme as well as being invited to teach at the NTSO Youth Music Camp in Taiwan. He is currently an adjunct faculty member at Hong Kong Baptist University and the Hong Kong Academy for Performing Arts.
