= Accommodation at the University of Hong Kong =

This page describes residential halls, colleges and residences at the University of Hong Kong (HKU).

== Residential halls ==
=== St. John's College ===
The university's first hall of residence, St. John's Hall, was built by the Church Missionary Society in late 1912. It has been a tradition of the hall to hold High Table Dinner every week since its introduction in 1916. This custom was subsequently taken up by other halls. St. John's Hall housed male students until the Japanese occupation of Hong Kong. The original site is now occupied by St. Paul's College. A post-War inspection on August 31, 1945, found the hall totally ruined with only four of its walls remaining. Combined with St. Stephen's Hall, the new St. John's College was built in 1955 in 82 Pokfulam Road to replace the former hall.

=== Old Halls ===
Old Halls is a collective name of Lugard Hall, Eliot Hall and May Hall given in 1969. It was closed in 1992. The first residential hall under the university's direct management was Lugard Hall, which opened in 1913 and was originally named University Hall (not to be confused with the later University Hall purchased in 1956). It was followed by Elliot Hall and May Hall, which opened in 1914 and 1915 respectively. The three-storey red-brick Edwardian-style buildings on terraces were linked by corridors and stairs. They were designed by the Architect Messrs Denison, Ram and Gibbs.

When the Japanese invaded Hong Kong at the end of 1941, these buildings became part of a temporary relief hospital set up to provide additional support to Queen Mary Hospital.

Torrential rain in 1966 necessitated repairs to Elliot and May Halls. When works were completed, they were combined with Lugard Hall to become one residential unit – Old Halls. When Lugard Hall was subsequently demolished in 1991, the Old Halls became obsolete and the two remaining wings reverted to using their old names of Elliot Hall and May Hall. Elliot Hall has been converted into the Journalism and Media Studies Centre while May Hall is used as hostel for postgraduate students.

=== Morrison Hall (male undergraduates and mixed postgraduates) ===
Established in 1913 in memory of the first missionary to come to China, Robert Morrison.

The old male-only hall was demolished in 1968. The new Morrison Hall is re-established in 2005 with the aid from the old-Morrison alumni, located next to the Flora Ho Sport Centre. After St. John's and Lugard Halls, Morrison Hall was the third men's hostel built for students. Like St. John's Hall, it was established by a religious body, the London Missionary Society, in 1913 and located on Hatton Road. Rev. Robert Morrison, after whom the hostel was named, came to China in the early nineteenth century. He was an early missionary of the Society and the first translator of the Bible into Chinese. After his death, his collection of books was transferred from China and stored in the old City Hall. His library was acquired by the university library in 1925. In the Rare Book Room of the Main Library, readers can find his books bearing stamps of the old City Hall or some with his signatures.

In 1948 after the Second World War, the Hall underwent restoration, but was finally closed in 1968. In 1997, a plan to build a new hostel bearing the name Morrison Hall was initiated by old Morrisonians. On June 27, 2001, the "Campaign for Morrison Hall" started. The new building was in use from August 2005.

=== Ricci Hall (male only) ===
Founded in 1929 by the Society of Jesus Ricci Hall Residence was officially opened on 16 December 1929. In early 1960 it was decided that the space of Ricci Hall Residence was inadequate and it should be renovated and rebuilt. The renovation of the old block of Ricci Hall was completed in 1966, whereas construction of the new block on 8 December 1967. Since its establishment, Ricci Hall has bred many celebrities and leaders in different fields: politicians: Mr Michael Suen Ming Yeung and Mr Bill Lam Chung Lung; lawyers: Dr Patrick Yu Shuk Siu and Dr Martin Lee Chu-ming; merchants: Dr Stanley Ho Hung Sun and Mr Linus Cheung Wing Lam; artists: Mr Sam Hui Koon Kit and Mr James Wong Jim (1941–2004). Having five separate blocks connected together in order to foster communication among residents, Ricci Hall is unique in the architectural structure. There are total 120 single rooms with a balcony and 16 corridors. The facilities of Ricci Hall include a tennis court, a car park, a dining hall, two libraries, a billiard room, a chapel, a laundry, and 16 pantries at the end of each corridor.

=== Lady Ho Tung Hall (female only) ===
Lady Ho Tung Hall was founded in 1951 by Ho Tung to memorialise his wife, Lady Margaret Ho Tung, who died in 1943. The old building was demolished and rebuilt in 1998. This traditional hall provides a variety of activities including 11 Sports teams, 4 cultural teams and 3 interest classes.*

=== University Hall (male only) ===
This castle-like building is a charming blend of Tudorbethan and Gothic revival architecture. It was built about 1861 by Douglas Lapraik, a Scottish businessman, who named the two-storey building with its four corner towers Douglas Castle. After the French Mission bought the house in 1894, the building was renamed Nazareth House, and housed a dormitory, a chapel, a library and a large printing house famous for printing about 60,000 books annually in 28 languages. The University of Hong Kong acquired the house in 1956 and converted it into a men's residence hall, renaming it University Hall.

=== Robert Black College (postgraduates and visitors only) ===
Founded in 1967 with the help of Sir Shiu Kin Tang. Named after Governor Robert Black.

=== Swire Hall ===
Founded with the help of the Swire Group in 1980.

=== Simon K. Y. Lee Hall ===
Founded by Justice of the Peace Lee Kwok Yin in 1985.

=== Lee Hysan Hall ===
Named after renowned land developer Lee Hysan and founded in 1992. Unity, Harmony, Choice and Responsibility, Positive

=== R. C. Lee Hall ===
Founded with the help of Richard Charles Lee in 1992. Located on 6 Sassoon Road. The founding warden is Dr. Robert Chung, who was the former director of the Public Opinion Programme of the University of Hong Kong. The hall motto is "Liberty with Responsibility, Unity in Diversity."

=== Wei Lun Hall ===
Founded with the help of the Wei Lun Foundation in 1994. Located on Sassoon Road.

=== Madam S.H. Ho Residence for Medical Students ===
The residence was opened in 1992 and accommodates 150 medical students, most of whom are fourth year students taking a specialty clerkship or final year students. A few rooms are available for overseas students.

=== Graduate House (postgraduates only) ===
Founded in 1998.

=== Starr Hall ===
Founded in 2001 with the help of the Hong Kong Jockey Club. It is the largest residential hall in HKU, accommodating 500 students.

=== Lee Shau Kee Hall ===
Lee Shau Kee Hall opened its doors at the end of August 2005. It is located in the Jockey Club Student Village II. The first affiliated student association was established among three new halls.

=== Suen Chi Sun Hall ===
Suen Chi Sun Hall was newly established in September 2005 together with the other two new halls as part of the Jockey Club Student Village II. It is next to the Flora Ho Sport Centre.

== Residential colleges ==
The four residential colleges, Shun Hing College, Chi Sun College, Lap-Chee College and New College, located in the Jockey Club Student Village III were founded in September and October 2012. They provide a total of 1800 beds for students of whom 67% are non-local students. Traditional functions of halls such as high table dinner are kept in these colleges.

=== Shun Hing College ===
Founded in 2012 as Residential Colleges Block A. Named in recognition of Shun Hing Education and Charity Fund.

=== Chi Sun College ===
Founded in 2012 as Residential Colleges Block B. Named in recognition of the donation from Mr Suen Chi Sun's family through the Simatelex Charitable Foundation.

=== Lap-Chee College ===
Founded in 2012 as Residential Colleges Block C. Named after former Vice-Chancellor, Professor Lap-Chee Tsui.

=== New College ===
Founded in 2012 as Residential Colleges Block D. Named in recognition of The Tung Foundation.

== Jockey Club Student Village IV ==
Jockey Club Student Village IV, located in Wong Chuk Hang, is the fourth cluster of residential complexes in the University named after The Hong Kong Jockey Club in recognition of a donation from the Club’s Charities Trust. The four residential colleges in the Village, distributed in two 17-floor towers, provide a total of 1,238 hostel places for students. Traditional functions of halls such as high table dinner are kept in these colleges.

== Other residences ==
=== Pokfield Road Residence ===
Mainly for exchange and postgraduate students.

=== Patrick Manson Student Residences ===
Mainly for exchange undergraduate students.

== Non-residential halls ==
=== Hornell Hall (male only) ===
Founded in 1953 as Men's Non-Residential Hall. Renamed Hornell Hall for memorial of Vice-Chancellor Sir William Hornell.

=== Duchess of Kent Hall (female only) ===
Founded in 1953. Named with the permission of HRH Princess Marina, Duchess of Kent.

=== Lee Chi Hung Hall ===
Founded in 1995. Named after Lee Chi Hung.
