= Zhongshan School of Medicine, Sun Yat-sen University =

University in Guangzhou, China

- Simplified Chinese: 中山医科大学
- Traditional Chinese: 中山醫科大學
Transcriptions
Standard Mandarin
- Hanyu Pinyin: Zhōngshān Yīkēdàxué
Yue: Cantonese
- Jyutping: zung1 saan1 ji1 fo1 daai6 hok6

The Zhongshan School of Medicine, Sun Yat-sen University is the medical school of Sun Yat-sen University, located in Yuexiu District, Guangzhou, Guangdong Province, China.

== History ==
Its predecessor was the Boji Medical School, which was founded in 1866, it was the earliest Western medical school in mainland China. Sun Yat-sen studied medicine here in 1886. After several adjustments, the school developed into Sun Yat-sen University of Medical Sciences. On October 26, 2001, Sun Yat-sen University of Medical Sciences merged with Sun Yat-sen University. The basic medical school and clinical medical school of the former Sun Yat-sen University of Medical Sciences were merged and restructured into the School of Medicine of Sun Yat-sen University.

== Gallery ==
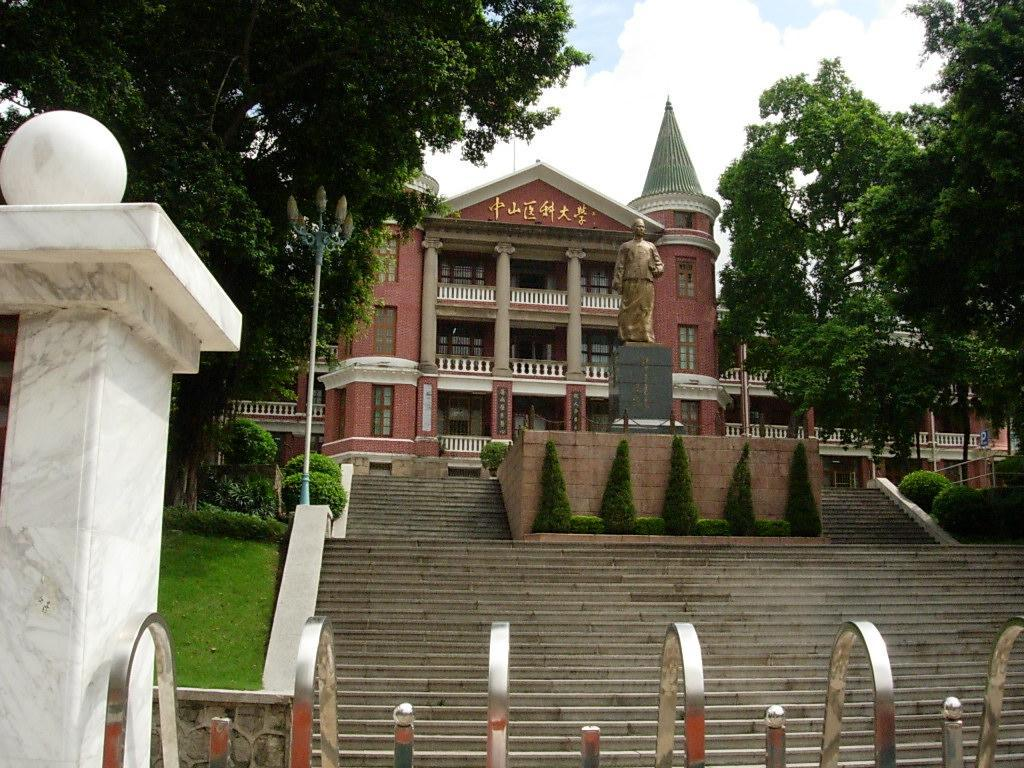
Sun Yat-Sen University of Medical Sciences

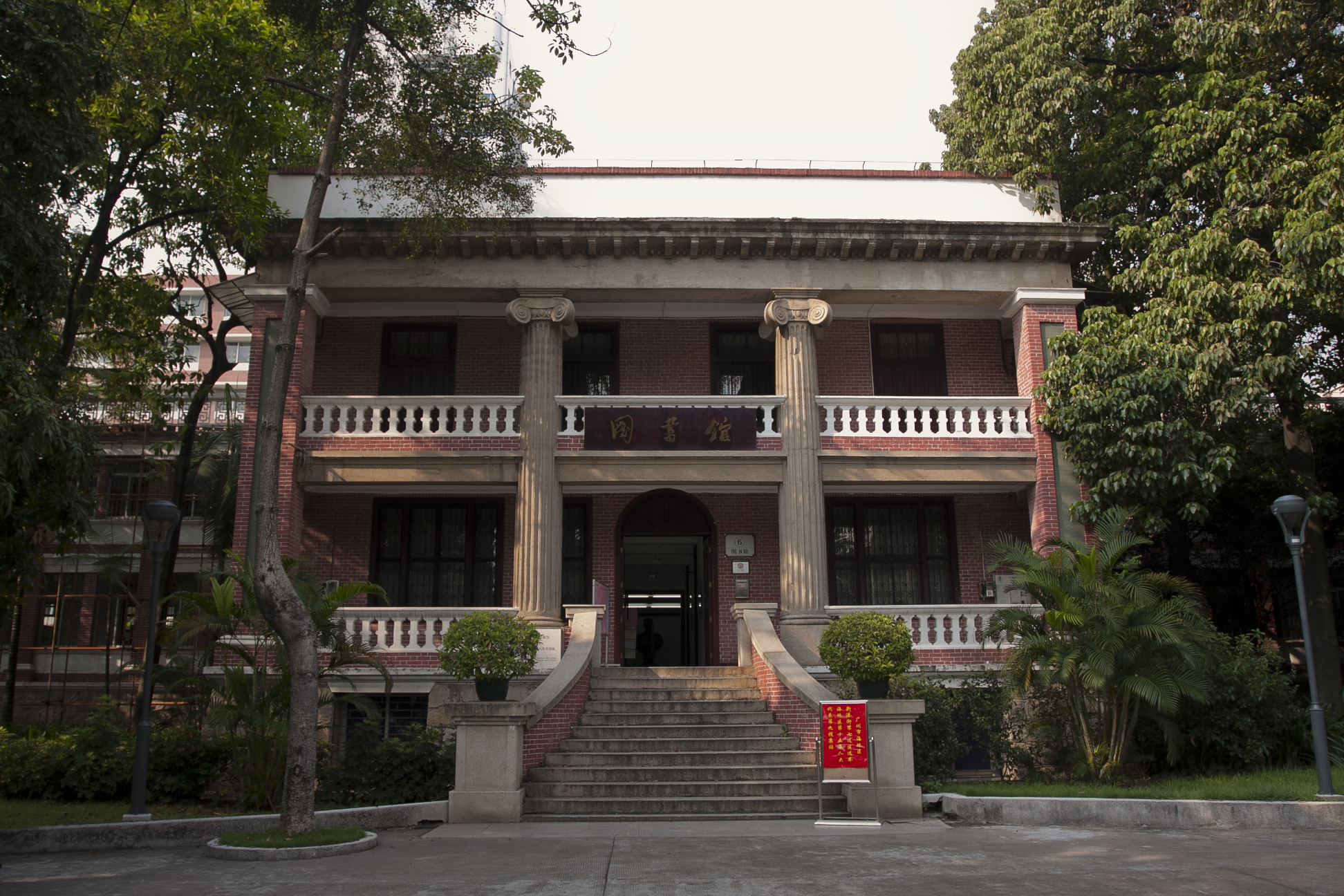
Library of the Sun Yat-sen University of Medical Sciences

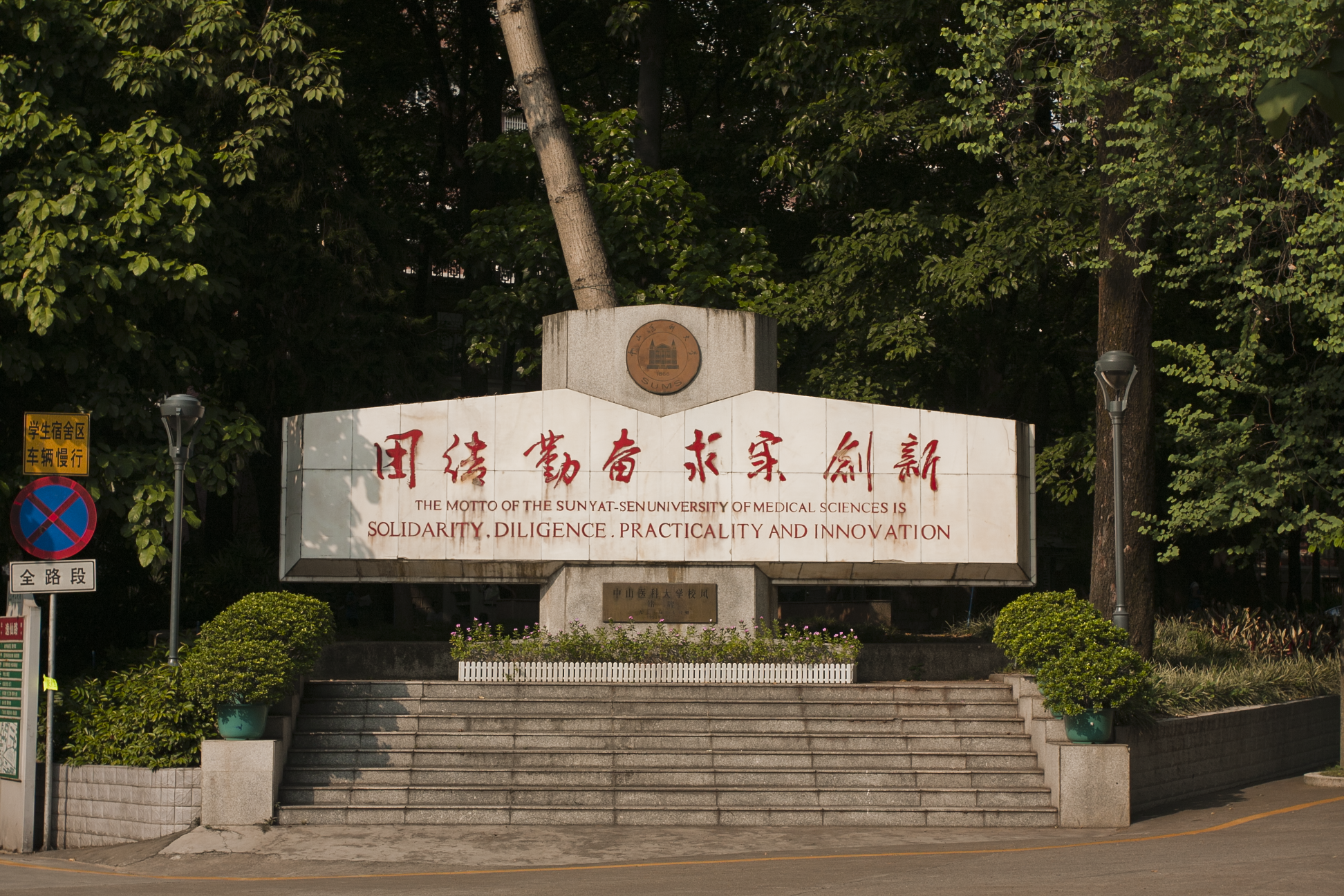
Motto of the Sun Yat-sen University of Medical Sciences
