= Josiah Lau =

Hong Kong television presenter

Josiah Lau Ka Kit (Traditional Chinese: 劉家傑, Simplified Chinese: 刘家杰, Pinyin: Liú Jiājié, born in 1940 in Hong Kong with family roots in Shunde, Guangdong, China) is an English language teacher in Hong Kong who hosted "One Minute's English" on RTHK, an English-teaching TV programme of the 1990s. He studied at the University of Hong Kong in early 1960s, majoring in English and British literature.

Before that, Lau worked as a news reporter on TVB. On 9 September 1976, the day Chinese Communist Party Chairman Mao Zedong died in Beijing, Lau narrated a three-hour documentary about Mao. The TVB documentary was heavily criticised by nationalists and by the local right-wing press for distorting historical facts to flatter the Communists. The program was specifically criticised for attributing the Nanking massacre to the Nationalist Army. Lau was suspended by the broadcaster. He then resigned to settle the disappointment, but the reason why he made the narration remains a mystery.

Lau emigrated to Canada before the transfer of sovereignty over Hong Kong in 1997.

== Origin of his English name - Josiah ==
Joshua was the name given to him when he was baptised, and his father had wanted him to use that name when he entered an English school. But it was misspelled as Joshia. A teacher offered to fix the spelling for him, venturing a guess that the original intent was to use the name Josiah. As Lau confessed, the name Josiah has caused him inconvenience throughout his life, where many of his acquaintances would struggle to pronounce or spell his name properly, and resort to referring to him as K.K. (The initials of his Chinese given name). Yet, the name Josiah, as with his endorsement deals with electronic dictionaries, became associated with brand names, and so he was effectively stuck with it. As Lau himself pointed out, the name he was originally given, Joshua, is now the name given to his son.
