= Hong Kong Academy of Medicine =

Coordinates: 22°15′03″N 114°10′18″E

- 香港醫學專科學院
- Aberdeen, Hong Kong Island

Information
- Established: 1993
- President: Philip Kam-tao Li
- Website: www.hkam.org.hk

The Hong Kong Academy of Medicine (HKAM) is an independent statutory body established in 1993 to oversee postgraduate medical and dental education and training in Hong Kong. The Academy is responsible for the accreditation of medical and dental specialist training, the regulation of continuing medical education (CME) and continuous professional development (CPD), and the maintenance of professional standards for specialists in Hong Kong. It has 15 constituent specialty colleges that organise structured training programmes recognized by the Academy Council for the respective specialties.

== History ==
Efforts to standardize specialist training in Hong Kong began in the late 1980s, when individual medical and dental specialties operated their own training frameworks. Recognizing the need for centralized standards and statutory oversight, the Hong Kong Government passed the Hong Kong Academy of Medicine Ordinance in 1992, and the Academy was formally established in 1993.

Professor Sir David Todd, a haematologist and medical educator, was appointed by the government as the Chairman of the Preparatory Committee and later became the founding president of the Academy. His leadership and contributions played a pivotal role in shaping the Academy's early direction and raising the standards of specialist training in Hong Kong.

The Academy's dedicated headquarters building in Aberdeen, Hong Kong Island, was inaugurated in 1998. It houses administrative offices, training facilities, examination rooms, and lecture halls for education, training and knowledge exchange. The current President is Professor Philip Kam-tao Li.

=== Roles and functions ===
The Hong Kong Academy of Medicine is the statutory authority for:

- Accreditation of specialist training programs for medical and dental professionals.
- Examination and certification for the award of Fellowship, which is the recognized qualification for specialist registration.
- Continuing Medical Education (CME) and Continuous Professional Development (CPD) requirements for maintaining certification.

Its statutory powers ensure that training and assessment standards meet recognized international benchmarks. A registered medical practitioner or dentist who wishes to have his/her name included in the Specialist Register of Medical Council of Hong Kong or Dental Council of Hong Kong must be either a Fellow of the Academy, or certified by the Academy to have training and qualification comparable (or equivalent in the case of an application from a dentist) to that required of an Academy Fellow in the relevant specialty.

=== Governance and structure ===
The Academy is governed by a Council consisting of 6 Officers, 15 Ex Officio Members, who are the President of each Academy College, and 5 elected Members. The Council is chaired by the President of the Academy, with various Committees formed under it to oversee specific functions. The Council meets once a month, and its full duties and responsibilities are set out in the Hong Kong Academy of Medicine Ordinance, Regulations and Bylaws.

The Council recognized a total of 15 Academy Colleges which are listed below:

- The Hong Kong College of Anaesthesiologists
- Hong Kong College of Community Medicine
- The College of Dental Surgeons of Hong Kong
- Hong Kong College of Emergency Medicine
- The Hong Kong College of Family Physicians
- The Hong Kong College of Obstetricians and Gynaecologists
- The College of Ophthalmologists of Hong Kong
- The Hong Kong College of Orthopaedic Surgeons
- The Hong Kong College of Otorhinolaryngologists
- Hong Kong College of Paediatricians
- The Hong Kong College of Pathologists
- Hong Kong College of Physicians
- The Hong Kong College of Psychiatrists
- Hong Kong College of Radiologists
- The College of Surgeons of Hong Kong

=== Facilities and funding ===
The HKAM Jockey Club Building, located in Wong Chuk Hang, occupies 4,300 square metres of land and provides around 15,000 square metres of gross floor area across 10 storeys. It houses the HKAM Secretariat Office, head offices of its 15 Academy Colleges, offices of the Medical Council of Hong Kong and the Dental Council of Hong Kong. The building contains auditoriums, lecture theatres, function rooms, and training facilities used for conferences, examinations, and scientific meetings.

The Hong Kong Jockey Club Charities Trust provided funding for the building's construction and has continued to support HKAM initiatives, including the Jockey Club Institute for Medical Education and Development (JCIMED) and the Hong Kong Jockey Club Disaster Preparedness and Response Institute. The Hong Kong Jockey Club Disaster Preparedness and Response Institute was concluded in October 2022.

== Notable initiatives ==
The Hong Kong Academy of Medicine has developed collaborations with local, regional, and international institutions in medical education and training.

In Hong Kong, the Academy works with the Faculty of Medicine of the Chinese University of Hong Kong, the Li Ka Shing Faculty of Medicine of the University of Hong Kong, and the Hospital Authority. Together, these bodies plan to hold the Quadripartite Medical Education Conference every three years beginning in 2026. The Academy has also collaborated with the Hong Kong Sports Institute on projects related to sports and exercise medicine.

Regionally, the Academy partners with medical organizations in mainland China and Macao to support specialist training and accreditation standards. It also co-organizes the AMM-AMS-HKAM Tripartite Congress of Medicine with the Academy of Medicine of Malaysia and the Academy of Medicine, Singapore, and has signed a memorandum of understanding with the Korean Academy of Medical Sciences.

Internationally, the Academy's CME and CPD programs have been recognized as substantively equivalent to the Maintenance of Certification Programme of the Royal College of Physicians and Surgeons of Canada. It has also hosted joint conferences and seminars with international organizations such as the World Health Organization, the General Medical Council and Department of Health of the United Kingdom, and Harvard T.H. Chan School of Public Health.

In January 2023, the Academy co-hosted the Tripartite Medical Education Conference with the Faculty of Medicine, the Chinese University of Hong Kong and the LKS Faculty of Medicine, the University of Hong Kong. The meeting focused on undergraduate and postgraduate medical education under the theme "Actualising the Curriculum Continuum." The conference was attended by government officials, counterparts, as well as local and overseas speakers.
