= George She =

Hong Kong social activist

Rev. Canon George She G.S. Zimmern JP
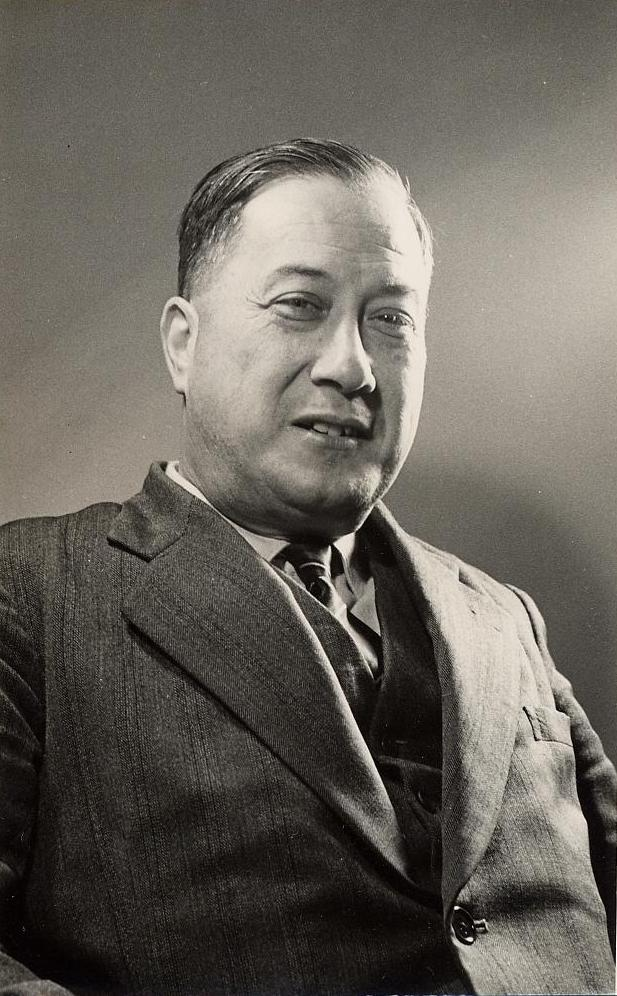
- Portrait of George She, c.1960s

Headmaster of the Diocesan Boys' School
- In office 1955—1961
- Preceded by: G. A. Goodban
- Succeeded by: S. J. Lowcock

Personal details
- Born: 17 February 1904 Hong Kong
- Died: 19 November 1979 (aged 75) Bristol, United Kingdom
- Education: Oxford University

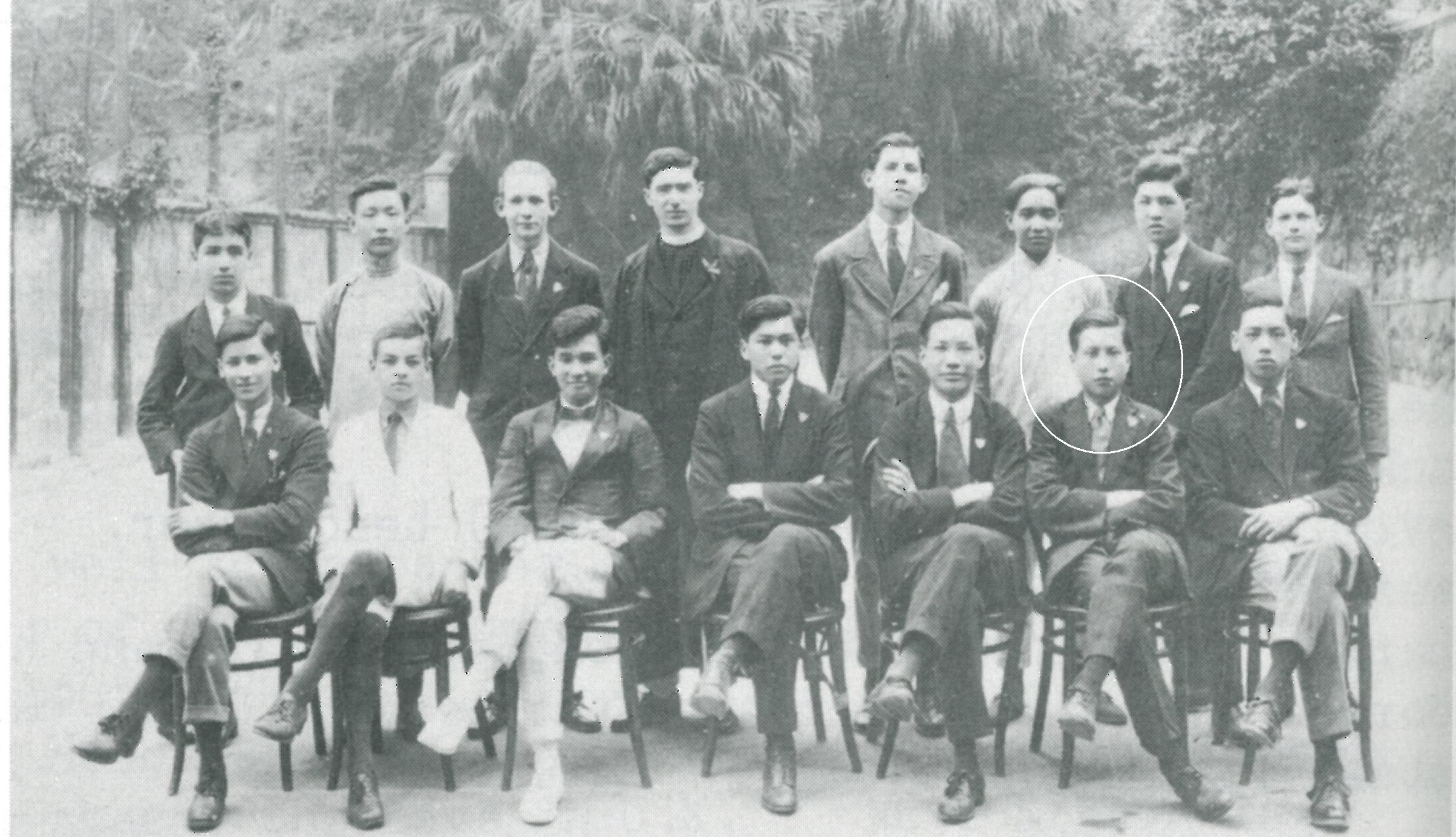
George Zimmern as a prefect

George Samuel Zimmern JP (17 February 1904 – 19 November 1979), also known in the Chinese community as Canon George She (施玉麒), was a well respected educator and social activist in Hong Kong. Born into a prominent Hong Kong Eurasian family, he attended the Diocesan Boys' School, HK, followed by Oxford University in England. While in England, he qualified as a barrister-at-law in Gray's Inn, London in 1934.

Returning to Hong Kong, he worked in a wide array of professional capacities, including priest, deacon, barrister, magistrate, warden of St. John's Hall (1939–1952), headmaster of Diocesan Boys' School (1955–1961), and honorary canon of St. John's Cathedral.

Under his leadership at Diocesan Boys School, the student population grew from 700 to over 1,100, with more boys from lower socio-economic backgrounds being admitted than before.

Through his close friendship and association with Bishop R. O. Hall, Canon She also founded a number of charitable organizations in Hong Kong, including the Street Sleepers' Shelter Society, the Boys' and Girls' Clubs Association, the Housing Society and a number of workers' children schools.

He baptised Sir Robert Ho Tung on his death bed, as well as Sir Shouson Chow. After retiring from DBS in 1961, he and his family settled in Bristol, where he worked at Bristol Cathedral School and served as priest-in-charge of Christ Church with St Ewen until his death.
