= Tin Hong =

Writer

天航
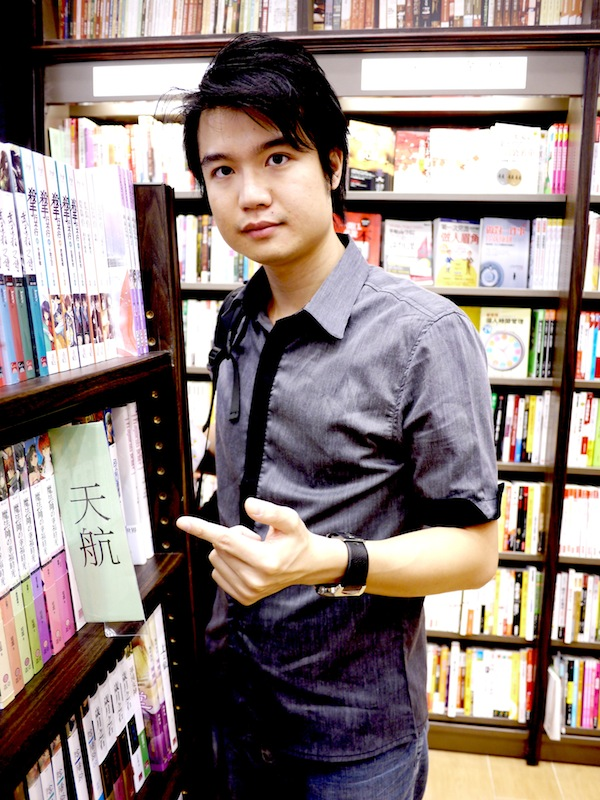
- Born: 17 December 1980 (age 45)
- Occupations: Author, novelist, publisher
- Writing career
- Language: Chinese, English
- Period: 2000–present
- Genres: Romance, Fantasy
- Notable works: When Sagittarius meets Aries(戀上白羊的弓箭),The Death of a Bookworm(書蟲的少年時代), and the D Series(D系列)
- Website: www.tinhong.net

Tin Hong (天航, born on 17 December 1980) is a Hong Kong author living in Taiwan. He has created more than 30 personal works that were widely distributed in Hong Kong, Taiwan, and China. His major works include the REPLAY★AMOEBA Series and the D Series.

Tin Hong majored in psychology and economics in the University of Hong Kong. When he was 19, he started his writing career under SCMP Book Publishing. He made his debut with When Sagittarius meets Aries(戀上白羊的弓箭) in 2000, which was later adopted into drama by the Live Theatre in 2013. Later Tin Hong published other popular romance novels including The Death of a Bookworm(書蟲的少年時代) and the Sheep in Wolf's Clothing(披上狼皮的羊咩咩), while the latter was also dramatised in 2014. In 2004, he set up his own publishing house. He moved to Taipei in 2010, and then married to a Taiwanese designer.

Tin Hong's books are well received by the teenage audience. His books are mostly of fantasy and romance, usually touching upon historical issues and exploring injustice in the society. Greatly influenced by Yu Hua‘s To Live, Tin Hong's books reflect on the connections between individuals and history. Ni Kuang spoke highly of Tin Hong's D Series as he finds the topic unique and interesting, covering romance, joy and sorrows, and global issues.

He was the Best Selling Local Male Author of the Year in 2005, 2006, 2011, and 2012. Tin Hong also got his The Last Will of Emperor Qin (秦始皇最恐怖的遺言) ranked first on Commercial Press Bestsellers of 2012. His The Death of a Bookworm (書蟲的少年時代) and Sixty Four Codons (愛因斯坦被摑了一巴) were on the list of the 15th and 19th Annual Best Books for Secondary School Students.

== Major publications ==
=== REPLAY★AMOEBA Series ===
- 0. When Sagittarius meets Aries (Complete Version) (戀上白羊的弓箭 完全版) (2008)
- 2. The Love Story on Gentlemen Street (Summer) (君子街，淑女拳 夏之卷) (2008)
- 4. The Sheep in Wolf's Clothing (Complete Version) (披上狼皮的羊咩咩 完全版) (2009)
- 5. The Death of a Bookworm (Complete Version) (書虫的少年時代 完全版) (2011)
- 6. Beyond the Finish Line (Complete Version) (四百米的終點線 完全版) (2010)

=== 3-Point SHOOTER Series ===
- 1. 3-Point SHOOTER 1 (Complete Version) (三分球神射手 1 完全版) (2011)
- 2. 3-Point SHOOTER 2 (Complete Version) (三分球神射手 2 完全版) (2011)
- 3. 3-Point SHOOTER 3 (Complete Version) (三分球神射手 3 完全版) (2011)
- 4. 3-Point SHOOTER 4 (Complete Version) (三分球神射手 4 完全版) (2012)
- 5. 3-Point SHOOTER 5 (Complete Version) (三分球神射手 5 完全版) (2012)
- 6. 3-Point SHOOTER 6 (Complete Version) (三分球神射手 6 完全版) (2012)

=== D Series ===
- 1. Sixty-Four Codons (愛因斯坦被摑了一巴) (2006)
- 2. The Sarira's Smile (蕭邦的刀，少女的微笑) (2007)
- 3. The Keisei's Calligraphy (宮本武藏的末世傳人) (2011)
- 4. The Last Will of Emperor Qin (秦始皇最恐怖的遺言) (2012)
- 5. Maya the Diviner (先知瑪雅的預知夢) (2015)
- 6. The Mandela Experiment in Time (曼德拉超時空實驗) (2018)

=== The Book Wars Series ===
- 1. The Book Wars Vol.1 France (書中自有五環戰士 法國篇) (2009)
- 2. The Book Wars Vol.2 England (書中自有五環戰士 英國篇) (2013)
