= Hong Kong College of Physicians =

Professional body for physicians in Hong Kong

The Hong Kong College of Physicians (HKCP; Chinese: 香港內科醫學院) is a professional body responsible for the postgraduate training, examination and accreditation of specialists in internal medicine and its subspecialties in Hong Kong. It is one of the founding constituent colleges of the Hong Kong Academy of Medicine (HKAM).

Established in October 1985, the College is responsible for overseeing specialist training, assessment, and professional standards in internal medicine and its subspecialties in Hong Kong. It administers training and certification programmes for physicians and supports continuing medical education and continuing professional development for its fellows. Fellows who meet the prescribed training, examination, and continuing education requirements may be recommended by the Hong Kong Academy of Medicine for inclusion in the Specialist Register maintained by the Medical Council of Hong Kong. As of June 2026, the College comprised 2,248 fellows, making it the largest of the fifteen constituent colleges of the Academy.

== History ==
Western medical training in Hong Kong dates to the founding of the Hong Kong College of Medicine in 1887, which was established to train local Chinese in Western medicine and was among the earliest such efforts in Southeast Asia. That college was later incorporated as the Faculty of Medicine of the University of Hong Kong (founded 1912), which remained the territory's only undergraduate medical school until it was joined by the Faculty of Medicine of the Chinese University of Hong Kong in 1980.

The Hong Kong College of Physicians was established in October 1985 by specialists in internal medicine in Hong Kong to promote the development of the specialty and provide a local framework for postgraduate professional training.

Following the establishment of the Hong Kong Academy of Medicine in 1992, the College assumed statutory responsibilities for specialist training and examinations in internal medicine under the Academy's framework. The Hong Kong Academy of Medicine Ordinance (Cap. 419) came into effect on 1 August 1992, under which the Academy's Interim Council admitted twelve founding colleges, including the Hong Kong College of Physicians. In July 1993, the College's Joint Committee on Internal Medicine Training published the first edition of the Guidelines on Postgraduate Medical Training, prior to the formal inauguration of the Academy in December 1993. A second edition of the guidelines was published in 1998.
