= Hong Kong Chinese Christian Churches Union Pok Fu Lam Road Cemetery =

Cemetery in Hong Kong Island, Hong Kong

Coordinates: 22.272995°N 114.128978°E

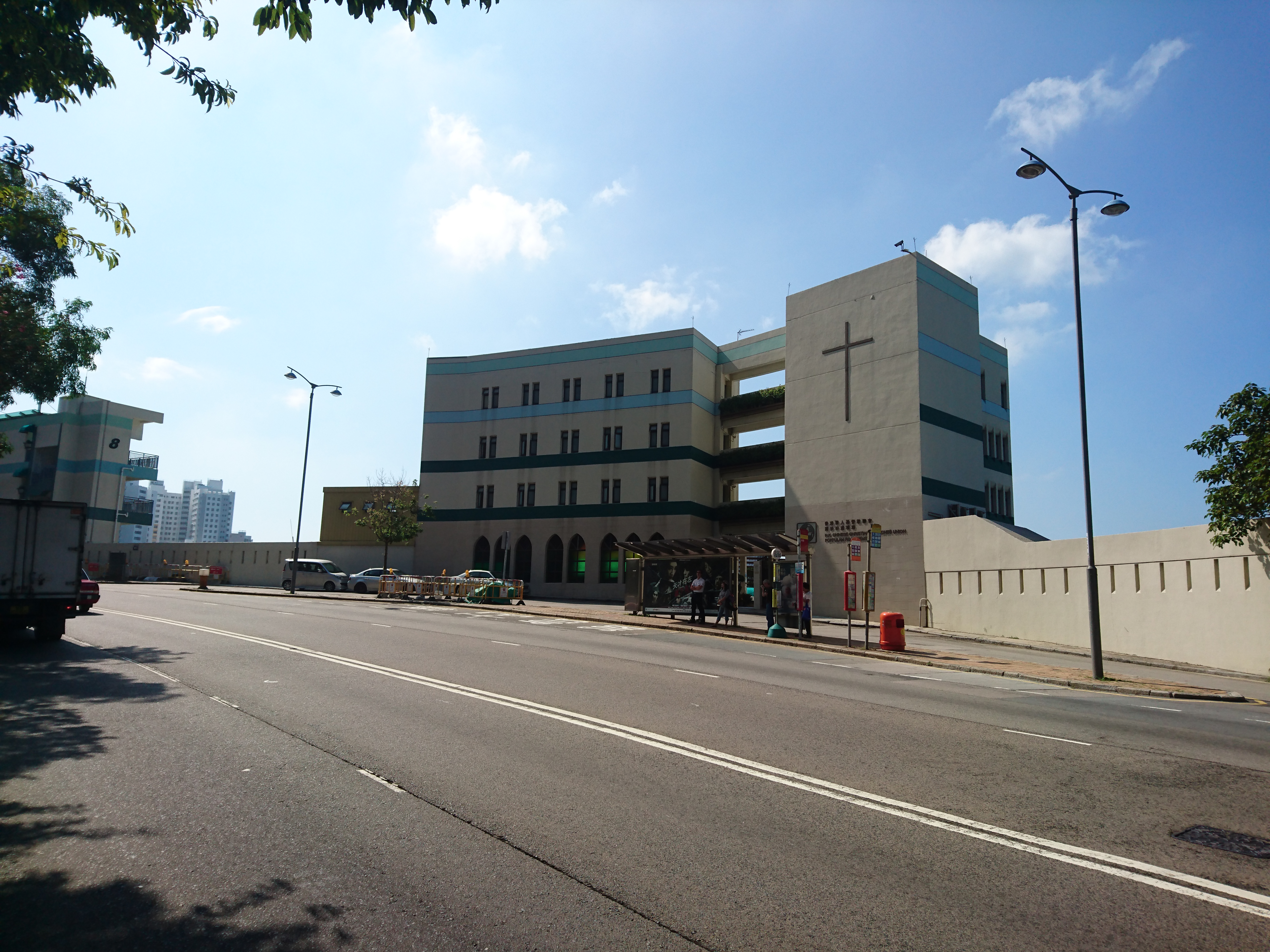
Main entrance of Hong Kong Chinese Christian Churches Union Pok Fu Lam Road Cemetery

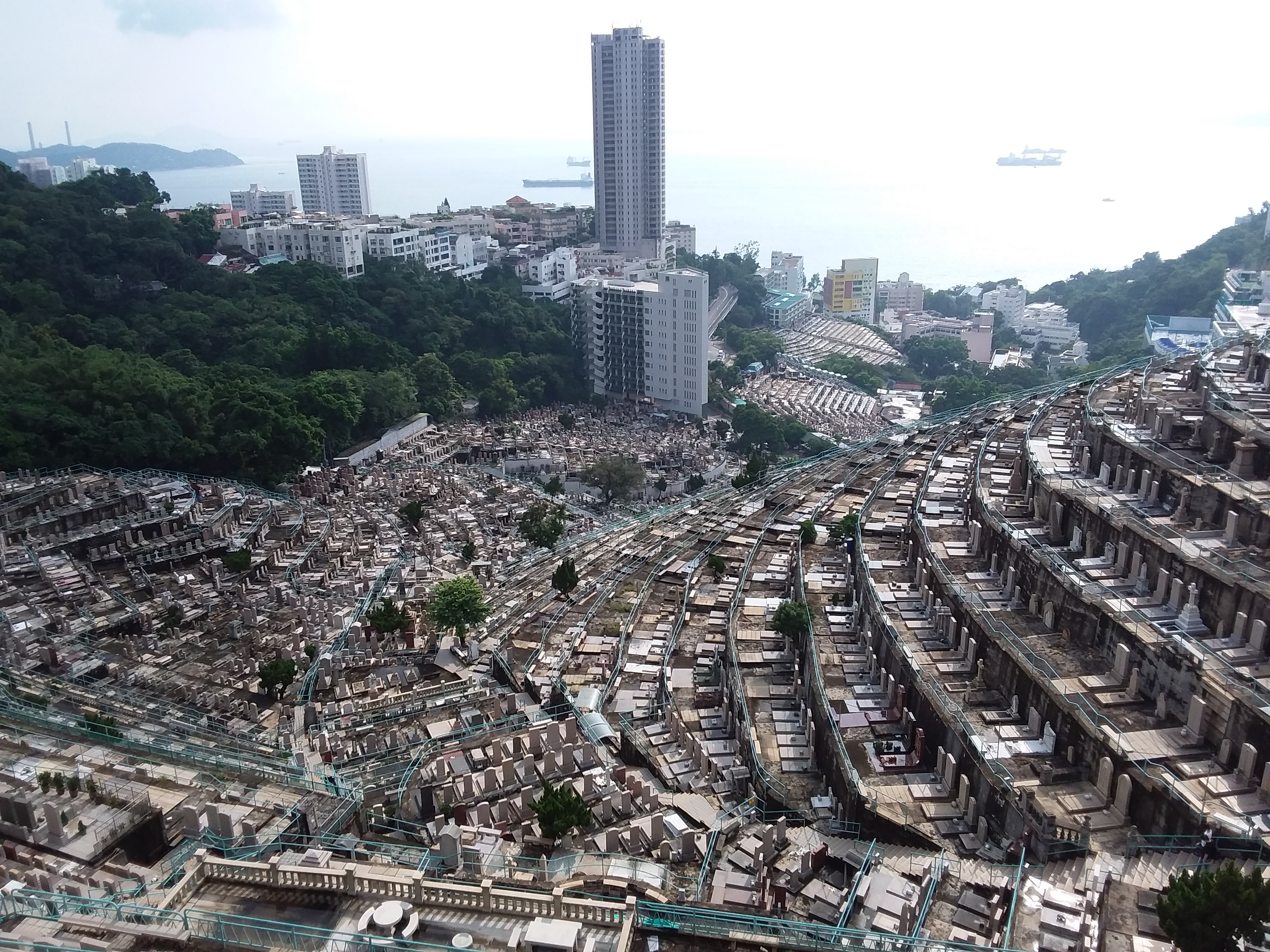
Hong Kong Chinese Christian Churches Union Pok Fu Lam Road Cemetery

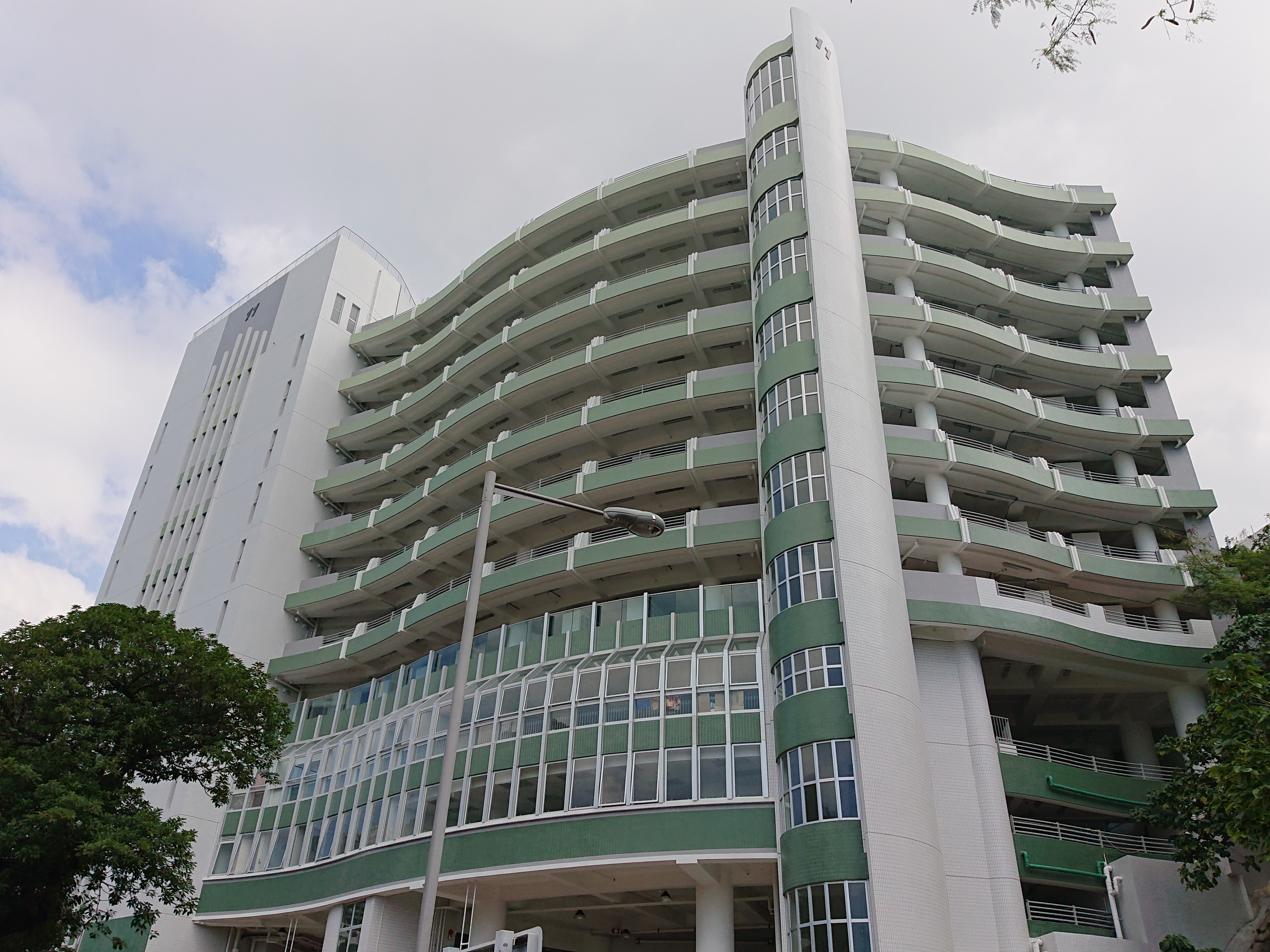
New columbarium building of Hong Kong Chinese Christian Churches Union Pok Fu Lam Road Cemetery

Hong Kong Chinese Christian Churches Union Pok Fu Lam Road Cemetery or Hong Kong Chinese Christian Churches Union Pokfulam Road Cemetery (Chinese: 香港華人基督教聯會薄扶林道墳場) is a cemetery in Pok Fu Lam, Hong Kong. It is managed by The Hong Kong Chinese Christian Churches Union (香港華人基督教聯會). It lies on the slopes east of Victoria Road between Tung Wah Coffin Home and Pok Fu Lam Road, facing Sandy Bay.

Many celebrities are buried in the cemetery, including the families of the four major department stores in Hong Kong (Sincere Department Store, Wing On Department Store, The Sun and Sun Sun Co. Department Store), famous author Xu Dishan, revolutionary Tse Tsan-tai, musician Ho Tai-sor and many more.

== History ==
The cemetery was built in 1882 on the hills in the Pok Fu Lam neighborhood of Hong Kong, sandwiched between Pok Fu Lam Road at the top and Victoria Road near the bottom. It was built from the higher contours and as the cemetery grew, it was expanded downwards towards Victoria Road. Today, a part of the cemetery lies beyond Victoria Road.

== Notable burials ==
- Au Fung-Chi (1847–1914), Sun Yat-sen's teacher of Chinese literature
- Wang Chung-yik (1888–1930), the first Chinese professor in Hong Kong
- Wang Chieu-ju (1847–1907), second son of Wang Yuenshen
- Wang Yuenshen (1817–1914), grandfather of Wang Chung-yik
- Wang Yuchu (1843–1902), father of Wang Chung-yik
- Wang Zemin, eldest son of Wang Chieu-ju
- Entao Liao (1864–1954), brother of Liao Zhongkai
- Zeng Guangshan (1871–1949), former Minister for National Defense of the People's Republic of China
- Yung Park (1865–1955), second senior pastor of The Church of Christ in China China Congregational Church (1903–1947)
- Yung Hei-kwong (1911–1983), son of Yung Park
- Xu Dishan (1893–1941), Chinese author, translator and folklorist
- Eddie Hui (1943–2009), last Commissioner of the Royal Hong Kong Police
- Tse Tsan-tai (1872–1938), revolutionary and co-founder of South China Morning Post
- He Dasha (1896–1957), one of the "Four Heavenly Kings" of Chinese music
- Li Yutang (1851–1936), a wealthy businessman in Guangdong, member of the Tongmenghui
- Chan Tsz-kiu, founder of Mansfield College
- Li Shu-fan (1887–1966), leader of the medical profession in Hong Kong and member of the Legislative Council of Hong Kong
- Sun Jinwan (1896–1979), daughter of Sun Yat-sen
- Tai En Sai (1892–1955), son-in-law of Sun Yat-sen
- Catherine F. Woo (1890–1979), the first female doctor in Hong Kong
- Wai Tak-Woo (1888–1964), eldest son of U I-kai
- Man-kai Wong (1870–1927), founder of Hong Kong Sanatorium & Hospital
- Morrison Brown Yung (1876–1933), eldest son of Yung Wing
- Ma Zaiming (1822–1916), father of Ma Ying-piu
- Vicar Tsing-Shan Fok (1851–1918), grandfather of Ma Ying-piu
- Ma Ying-piu (1860–1944), founder of Sincere Department Store
- Lam Woo (1871–1933), building contractor
- Wendy Wong (1867–1924), son of Wong Shing
- To Ying-kwan (1881–1928), brother-in-law of Liao Zhongkai
- Alice Hormusjee Ruttonjee (1886–1974),
- Yam Chan (1945–2008), DJ
- Guo Hao (1880–1946), founder of Wing On Department Store
- Choi Cheong (1877–1951), editor and director
- Lam Chi-fung (1892–1971), founder of Ka Wah Bank and Hong Kong Baptist University
- Ma Yi-ying (1909–1974), founding principal of Kowloon True Light School
- Shih Kien (1913–2009), actor
- Lo Duen (1911–2000), actor and producer
- Li Tse-fong (1891–1953), entrepreneur and politician
- Ng Wah (1874–1950), leading contractor, developer of Pedder Building and philanthropist
- Lo Ming Yau (1900–1967), entrepreneur and filmmaker
- Ellen Li (1908–2005), politician
- Yeung Kai-yin (1941–2007), former chairman and CEO of Kowloon–Canton Railway
- Renchao Cao (1947–2016), founder of Hong Kong Economic Journal
- Lai Sun Cheung (1950–2010), former professional football player
- Lee Wai Tong, footballer

== See also ==
- List of cemeteries in Hong Kong
