= May 1932 Hong Kong sanitary board election =

← 1930	10 May 1932	1932 (Nov) →
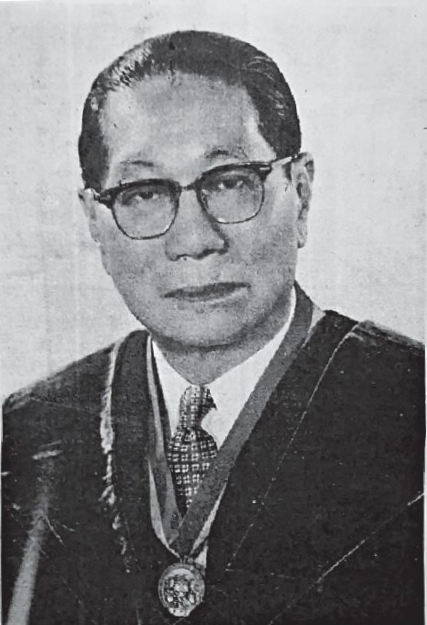

Nominee	Li Shu-fan	F. C. Mow Fung
Party	Nonpartisan	KRA
Popular vote	936	161
Percentage	85.32%	14.68%
Member before election
Lo Man-kam
Elected Member
Li Shu-fan

The May 1932 Hong Kong Sanitary Board election was held on 10 May 1932 for one of the two unofficial seats in the Sanitary Board of Hong Kong. It was one of the few contests in the Sanitary Board elections.

Only ratepayers who were included in the Special and Common Jury Lists of the years or ratepayers who are exempted from serving on Juries on account of their professional avocations, unofficial members of the Executive or Legislative Council, or categories of profession were entitled to vote at the election.

Dr. Li Shu-fan was nominated by Sir Henry Pollock and seconded by Sir Shouson Chow. His largest supporter was the incumbent Lo Man-kam who was appointed to the Board and left the vacancy. His challenger was Frederick Charles Mow Fung who was former president and the member of the committee of the Kowloon Residents' Association, nominated by the then President W. Walton Rogers and seconded by E. Cook. Li won the election by getting 936 votes over Mow Fung's 161 votes.

Dr. Li Shu-fan conducted an electioneering campaign using motor-cars carrying posters and supported by European and Chinese canvassers. "It was a campaign such as was never before seen in Hong Kong and desevered to succeed because of its thoroughness" as one press reported.
