= Frederick Charles Mow Fung =

Hong Kong businessman (1882–1950)

Frederick Charles Mow Fung, alias Chung Yau Tak Mow Fung, was an Australian Chinese merchant in Hong Kong.

== Biography ==
He began to live in Hong Kong from around 1895 and became one of the prominent residents in the colony. He was the partner of the Mow Fung & Company Limited. He was responsible for the formation and organisation of the wartime police reserve. He was also appointed assistant superintendent of police in command of the Chinese Company when the Police Reserve was formed in 1927. He was also responsible for the formation of the Chinese Special Constabulary which helped to government to maintain order during the Canton–Hong Kong strike in 1925.

F. C. Mow Fung was a director of the Kwong Wah Hospital between 1925 and 1926. He was also member of the General Committee of the Kowloon Residents' Association and was elected vice-president in 1929 and 1930 and president of the association in March 1931, replacing Rev. J. Horace Johnston of the St. Andrew's Church.

F. C. Mow Fung ran for the Sanitary Board election in May 1932 against Dr. Li Shu Fan, which made it one of the few contested Sanitary Board elections in history. Mow Fung was nominated by the then president of the Kowloon Residents' Association W. Walton Rogers and seconded by E. Cook, the past president of the association.

Mow Fung had been sued for occasions. In 1925 he was sued for wrongfully quarrying and removing granite from a group of Chinese contractors' land at Kowloon City. In 1948 he was sued for a transaction of property during the wartime.

He was a brother of Edward Mow Fung and Ruby Mow Fung.
