= United Chinese Bank =

United Chinese Bank may refer to:

- United Overseas Bank, a Singaporean bank formerly known as United Chinese Bank
- United Chinese Bank (Hong Kong), acquired by the Bank of East Asia in 1995
