= Li Fook-wo =

Li Fook-wo CBE, JP
- 李福和

Unofficial member of the Executive Council
- In office 1 September 1978 – 1985
- Appointed by: Sir Murray MacLehose; Sir Edward Youde
- Preceded by: Lee Quo-wei
- Succeeded by: Allen Lee

Unofficial member of the Legislative Council
- In office 7 July 1973 – 30 July 1981
- Appointed by: Sir Murray MacLehose

Personal details
- Born: 26 September 1916 Hong Kong
- Died: 4 July 2014 (aged 97) Hong Kong
- Spouse: Laura Jee
- Children: Aubrey Li Kwok-sing
- Parent: Li Tse-fong
- Occupation: Banker; Businessman; Politician

Li Fook-wo (26 September 1916 – 4 July 2014) was a Hong Kong politician and banker. He was the Chief Manager of the Bank of East Asia, his family business, and also unofficial member of the Executive and Legislative Councils of Hong Kong.

== Family ==
Born into a wealthy family on 26 September 1916, Li was the son of Li Tse-fong, founder of the Bank of East Asia and first unofficial member of the Legislative Council of Hong Kong in the Li family. His younger brother Li Fook-kow was a government official and also member of the Executive and Legislative Councils. Andrew Li, Li Fook-kow's son, was the Chief Justice of Hong Kong. He was married to Laura Jee and was father of Aubrey Li Kwok-sing and four daughters.

== Business career ==
After studying aboard in the United States, Li joined his family business at the Bank of East Asia as a junior member of staff in 1940, and rose to Chief Manager in 1972. He also served as Chief Manager of Hutchison Whampoa Limited and Johnson Electric Holdings Limited from 1972 to 1976, and as chairman of the two companies from 1984 to 1997. He was also director of twelve major companies at the same time. After his retirement, he continued his posts as non-executive director of Bank of East Asia (China) Ltd. and Bank of East Asia Ltd. from 1958 until 2008.

== Public service ==
Li was a member of the Hong Kong Trade Development Council, chairman of the Hong Kong Industrial Estates Corporation, vice-patron of the Community Chest of Hong Kong, vice-president of the executive committee of the Hong Kong Society for the Protection of Children (Po Leung Kuk). He was appointed as an unofficial member of the Legislative Council of Hong Kong in 1973 and subsequently the Executive Council in 1978. During his service in the Executive Council, he witnessed the Sino-British negotiations over Hong Kong sovereignty and the Sino-British Joint Declaration in 1984. Before the British prime minister Margaret Thatcher's visit to Beijing to discuss the sovereignty of Hong Kong after 1997, Li Fook-wo with Chung Sze-yuen, Chan Kam-chuen and Lydia Dunn, were the delegates of the unofficial members of the Executive and Legislative Council who flew to London and reflect the views of Hong Kong people.

Li was also a member of the board of trustees of the United College of the newly founded Chinese University of Hong Kong from 1961 to 1967, and was honorary treasurer of Chung Chi College from 1964 to 1970. He chaired the board of governors and the council of Chung Chi College between 1970 and 1976. In 1970, Li was appointed member of the council of the Chinese University of Hong Kong for a year. He was awarded the honorary degree of Doctor of Social Science by the university for his services in 1980. Li was a horse racing lover, and was a steward and deputy chairman of the Hong Kong Jockey Club.

Li died at the Hong Kong Adventist Hospital on 4 July 2014 at the age of 97.

== Honours ==
For his public services, he was made Justice of the Peace in 1946. He was awarded the Officer of the Order of the British Empire (OBE) in 1968, the Queen's Silver Jubilee Medal in 1977 and the Commander of the Order of the British Empire (CBE) in 1978.

== See also ==
- Four big families of Hong Kong

Business positions
Preceded by Sir Kan Yuet-keung	Chairman of the Bank of East Asia; 1984–1997	Succeeded by David Li
