= Li Tse-fong =

Hong Kong businessman (1881-1953)

Li Tse-fong JP
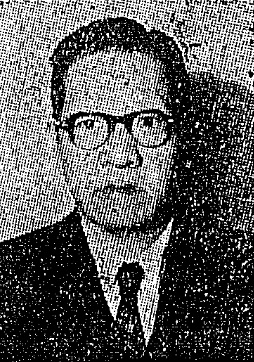

Unofficial Member of the Legislative Council of Hong Kong
- In office 7 July 1939 – 28 December 1939
- Appointed by: Sir Geoffry Northcote
- Preceded by: Li Shu-fan
- Succeeded by: Li Shu-fan
- In office 17 January 1941 – 25 December 1941
- Appointed by: Sir Mark Young
- Preceded by: Li Shu-fan

Personal details
- Born: 21 September 1891 Hong Kong
- Died: 5 September 1953 (aged 61) Nevada, United States
- Spouse: Tang Sau-hing
- Relations: Andrew Li (grandson)
- Children: 9, including Li Fook-wo and Li Fook-kow
- Education: Queen's College; University of Hong Kong
- Occupation: Businessman banker politician

Li Tse-fong (Chinese: 李子方; 21 September 1891 – 5 September 1953) was a Hong Kong entrepreneur and politician. He was a founder of the Bank of East Asia and member of the Legislative Council of Hong Kong.

== Education and business career ==
Born in Hong Kong on 21 September 1891, he was the son of a wealthy local businessman, Li Shek-pang. He was educated at the Queen's College and graduated with a Bachelor of Arts from the University of Hong Kong in 1916 as one of its first graduates.

After his education, Li entered into his father's rice business, the Nam Wo Hong and also his shipping business. When in 1917 the Hong Kong government announced the restriction of the use of vessels during the First World War, Li organised the local merchants to demand for the exemption of commercial vessels.

In November 1918, Li co-founded the Bank of East Asia with Fung Ping-shan, Kan Tung-po and his brother Li Koon-chun. Li Tse-fong became the bank's assistant manager, manager and later life director. He was also director of the China Emporium, China Provident Co., Ltd., Green Island Cement Co., Ltd., A. S. Watson Co, Ltd. and various public companies.

== Public service ==
Li was appointed to the Currency Committee in 1930, which laid the foundation of introducing the Hong Kong Dollar. He was later appointed to various public offices including the Board of Education from 1935, member of the Court of the University of Hong Kong from 1936, the Committee on the Training of Teachers Training of Teachers in 1938, and the War Revenue Committee in 1940.

Li was appointed to the Urban Council in 1939 in succession of W. N. T. Tam and was appointed member of the Legislative Council temporarily in 1939 during the absence of Li Shu-fan and again in 1941 before the Japanese invasion of Hong Kong. He was also Chairman of the Tung Wah Hospital and Po Leung Kuk, the two largest charities in Hong Kong at the time.

During the Japanese occupation of Hong Kong, he was appointed by the Japanese to the Chinese Representative Council and the Chinese Cooperative Council. In 1944, when the Japanese were losing the war, Li avoided their duties from the two Councils by withdrawing from the public life. Due to accusations of his collaboration with the Japanese (Bank of East Asia was one of the few banks that could resume business under Japanese rule and issued lottery tickets which raised fund for Imperial Armed forces), he was not reappointed to the Legislative Council after the war.

A post-war British military administration was set up with Brigadier David M. MacDougall as Chief Civil Affairs Officer, who explained why men like Li Tse-fong were not reappointed after the war: "Hong Kong was set to make a fresh start, if such was possible. Li Tse-fong ... who in a real sense bore the burden and the heat of Japanese occupation had thereby inevitably become controversial figures."

== Death and family ==
Li died on 5 September 1953 in the United States at a small town in Nevada called Winnemucca on his way to San Francisco from Colorado Springs, where he travelled to visit his daughters. His body was returned to Hong Kong by SS President Cleveland and was buried at the Hong Kong Christian Churches Union Pokfulam Road Cemetery after the funeral at Saint Paul's Church on 17 October, which was attended by many local community leaders.

Li married Tang Sau-hing, whose father was the comprador of the Mercantile Bank from whom Li acquired most of his banking knowledge and experience. They had nine children. His second son, Li Fook-wo, was also appointed member of the Legislative Council. His third son, Li Fook-tai, married Alice Yui, daughter of Yu Hung-chun, Premier of the Republic of China. Andrew Li, son of Li Tse-fong's another son, Li Fook-kow, was the first Chief Justice of the Court of Final Appeal of the Hong Kong SAR.

== Legacy ==
- Hong Kong Sheng Kung Hui North Point St. Peter's Church was originally envisioned by Li in 1950 and when construction was completed in 1962, the church was dedicated to the memory of Li Tse-fong and Tang Sau-hing
- LI Tze Fong Memorial Scholarship awards were endowed in 1998 to the glory of God and in memory of Li Tze Fong. The fellowships are open to outstanding graduates from any institution and country and are for full-time study and research leading to a master or doctorate degree at the University of British Columbia. The fellowships are open to candidates in any field of study which is offered at the University. Candidates are selected from applicants for University Graduate Fellowships. Recipients are known as Li Tze Fong Scholars.

== See also ==
- Four big families of Hong Kong

Legislative Council of Hong Kong
Preceded by Li Shu-fan	Chinese Unofficial Member; 1939	Succeeded by Li Shu-fan
Preceded by Li Shu-fan	Chinese Unofficial Member; 1941	Vacant Japanese occupation of Hong Kong
