= Li Fook-kow =

Hong Kong government official

Li Fook-kow CMG, JP
- 李福逑

Secretary for Home Affairs
- In office 1977–1980
- Governor: Sir Murray MacLehose
- Preceded by: Denis Bray
- Succeeded by: Denis Bray

Personal details
- Born: 15 June 1922 Hong Kong
- Died: 27 October 2011 (aged 89) Hong Kong
- Spouse: Edith Kwong Mei-yung
- Children: Andrew Li
- Parent: Li Tse-fong
- Education: Massachusetts Institute of Technology

Li Fook-kow
- Chinese: 李福逑
Transcriptions
Standard Mandarin
- Hanyu Pinyin: Lǐ Fúqiú
Yue: Cantonese
- Jyutping: lei5 fuk1 kau4

Li Fook-kow, CMG, JP (Chinese: 李福逑; 15 June 1922 – 27 October 2011) was a Hong Kong government official. He was the Secretary for Home Affairs and official member of the Executive Council and Legislative Council of Hong Kong.

== Biography ==
Li was born on 15 June 1922 in Hong Kong to the Li family. His father, businessman and politician Li Tse-fong, founded the Bank of East Asia. Li Fook-kow was educated at the Massachusetts Institute of Technology. He joined the Hong Kong government as assistant education officer in 1954 and made a student officer. From 1972 to 1983, he was chief officer and the Director of Social Welfare from 1973 to 1977. He was also appointed Secretary for Home Affairs, holding the post from 1977 to 1980. After retirement from government, he became chairman of the Public Service Commission from 1980 and 1987. From March to October 1987, he was appointed Public Opinion Survey Office Monitor for the controversial constitutional reform on the 1988 Legislative Council election.

== Personal life ==
Li was a Roman Catholic. He married Edith Kwong Mei-yung in 1946, and they had two sons and two daughters. His son Andrew Li Kwok-nang was the first Chief Justice of the Court of Final Appeal, from 1997 to 2010. His other children are daughters Carol and Elaine and son Michael Li Ka-wah. Li migrated to Canada before 1997 but later moved back to Hong Kong. He died at the Ruttonjee Hospital at the age of 89 on 27 October 2011.

== See also ==
- Four big families of Hong Kong

Government offices
Preceded by Denis Bray	Secretary for Home Affairs; 1977–1980	Succeeded by Denis Bray
