= Li family (banking) =

Hong Kong banking dynasty

The Li family (Chinese: 李) are a banking dynasty in Hong Kong and associated with the Bank of East Asia, although its family members have held positions in various other businesses, as well as the Hong Kong Government, the Hong Kong Judiciary, and the Hong Kong Legislative Council. While the Li family spans many generations and has many members, this page only includes those who were directly involved with the running of the Bank of East Asia. The "first generation" refers to the generation that founded the Bank.

Despite holding a minority stake in the Bank of East Asia, the Li family has been able to retain direct management control of the bank since 1918 through complex holding structures.

== First generation ==
=== Li Koon-chun (1887–1966) ===
Born into a wealthy family in Hong Kong, Li Koon-chun and his younger brother were approached by Kan Tong-po for financing to help form the Bank of East Asia in 1918.

=== Li Tse-fong (1891–1953) ===
The younger brother of Li Koon-chun, Li Tse-fong was one of the first graduates of the University of Hong Kong and worked in his father's rice and shipping business. After founding the Bank of East Asia in 1918, he was also a director of the China Emporium, China Provident Co. Ltd., Green Island Cement Co., Ltd., A. S. Watson Co., Ltd. and various other public companies.

=== Li Lan-sang (1900–1969) ===
Younger brother of Li Koon-chun and Li Tse-fong, Li Lan-sang helped establish Kowloon Dairy in 1940. He served as a director of the Bank of East Asia from 1933 until his death in 1969, when he died while watching horse racing at the Hong Kong Jockey Club.

== Second generation ==
=== Li Fook-shu (1912–1995) ===
The oldest son of Li Koon-chun, he was educated in England and qualified as an accountant; he was a member of the Institute of Chartered Accountants in England and Wales. He became a director of the Bank of East Asia in 1958, and remained a director until his death in 1995.

=== Simon Li (1922–2013) ===
The younger brother of Li Fook-shu, Simon Li was trained as a barrister at King's College London, the University of Hong Kong, and the University College London. He joined the judiciary in 1963, and became acting Chief Justice of Hong Kong in 1986. Upon his retirement in 1987, he joined the Bank of East Asia as a director until retirement from the board in 2006. He also stood in Hong Kong's first ever Hong Kong Chief Executive election in 1996.

=== Ronald Li (1929–2014) ===
The youngest son of Li Koon-chun, Ronald Li was educated at the University of Hong Kong and received an MBA at the Wharton School of the University of Pennsylvania. He created the Far East Exchange in 1969, breaking the Hong Kong Stock Exchange's monopoly in the buying and selling of stocks. In 1986, Li helped merge the Far East Stock Exchange with three other exchanges into the Stock Exchange of Hong Kong, precursor of today's Hong Kong Exchanges and Clearing, and became its first chairman. He was later arrested by the Independent Commission Against Corruption (ICAC) in December 1987 and in 1991 convicted of taking bribes in return for approving listings during his office as the Chairman of the Stock Exchange of Hong Kong in 1987. He was sent to Stanley Prison, and served 30 months of a four-year sentence.

=== Li Fook-wo (1916–2014) ===
Son of Li Tse-fong, Li Fook-wo joined the Bank of East Asia in 1940 and became Chief Manager (equivalent to Chief Executive Officer) in 1972, a post he held until 1976. He would also serve as the bank's chairman from 1984 to 1997.

=== Henry Li (1920–1993) ===
Younger brother of Li Fook-wo, Henry Li was trained as a doctor the president of the Hong Kong Medical Association from 1976 to 1978. He was a director of the Bank of East Asia from 1970 until his death in 1993.

=== Li Fook-kow (1922–2011) ===
Younger brother of Li Fook-wo and Henry Li, Li Fook-kow was educated at the Massachusetts Institute of Technology and joined the Hong Kong Government in 1954, later becoming the first Chinese to be appointed Secretary for Home Affairs, holding the post from 1977 to 1980.

=== Eric Li (born 1929) ===
Eric Li is the son of Li Lan-sang, and served as Chairman of Kowloon Dairy. Eric Li also served on the board of Bank of East Asia from 2006 to 2016.

== Third generation ==
=== Sir David Li (born 1939) ===
Son of Li Fook-shu, David Li studied mathematics at Imperial College London, and then studied economics and law at Selwyn College, University of Cambridge. He joined the bank in 1969, becoming Chief Executive in 1981 to 2019, and Chairman in 1997. Throughout his distinguished career, he served as a member of the Legislative Council, the Executive Council, was the Pro-Chancellor of the University of Hong Kong and sat on a number of boards of public Hong Kong companies. In the 2005 Queen's Birthday Honours, he was made a Knight Bachelor by the United Kingdom for his contributions to British education.

=== Arthur Li (born 1945) ===
Younger brother of David Li, Arthur Li is a qualified doctor and politician. Educated at the University of Cambridge, Arthur Li held several prominent roles in education and government, becoming the Vice-Chancellor of Chinese University of Hong Kong from 1996 to 2002, the Secretary for Education and Manpower from 2002 to 2007, and since 2015 has been appointed as the Chairman of the Council of the University of Hong Kong. He is also a current member of the Executive Council, and serves as a director of the Bank of East Asia.

=== Gladys Li (born 1948) ===
Daughter of Simon Li, Gladys Li trained as a barrister in England and became involved in politics and public affairs upon her return to Hong Kong in 1982. Appointed Queen's Counsel in 1990, she was the Chairman of the Hong Kong Bar Association in 1995 and 1996.

=== Stephen Li (born 1960) ===
Younger brother of Gladys Li, Stephen Li trained as an accountant at King's College London and joined the Bank of East Asia as a director in 2006.

=== Aubrey Li (born 1950) ===
Son of Li Fook-wo, Aubrey Li was educated at Brown University and received his MBA from Columbia University. He worked as an investment banker and joined the Bank of East Asia as a director in 1995.

=== Donald Li (born 1954) ===
Son of Henry Li, Donald Li was educated at Cornell University and at the University of Hong Kong Faculty of Medicine. Donald Li was an active member of a number of government and public health bodies as well as serving as a steward of the Hong Kong Jockey Club.

=== Andrew Li (born 1948) ===
Son of Li Fook-kow, Andrew Li was educated at the University of Cambridge as a barrister and was called to the Hong Kong Bar in 1973. He was appointed as Queen's Counsel in 1988 and became Hong Kong's 1st Chief Justice of the Court of Final Appeal, serving from the Court's establishment in 1997 until 2010. Lord Millett, who served alongside Li as a non-permanent judge of the CFA, described Li as "[certainly] the wisest" member of the court.

== Fourth generation ==
=== Adrian Li (born 1973) ===
Oldest son of David Li, Adrian Li first joined the Bank of East Asia in 2000, was appointed Deputy Chief Executive in 2009 and was appointed co-Chief Executive in 2019. Adrian Li was educated at the University of Cambridge (Robinson College) and the Kellogg School of Management of Northwestern University, and is a qualified solicitor in England and Wales and Hong Kong.

=== Brian Li (born 1974) ===
Younger brother of Adrian Li, Brian Li first joined the Bank of East Asia in 2002, was appointed Deputy Chief Executive in 2009 and was appointed co-Chief Executive in 2019. Brian Li was educated at the University of Cambridge and holds an MBA from Stanford University, and is qualified as a chartered accountant in England and Wales and Hong Kong.

=== Carol Li Rafferty (born 1979) ===
Granddaughter of Ronald Li (2nd generation family member), Carol Li Rafferty is an Assistant Dean at the Yale School of Management and Managing Director of the Yale Center Beijing, and currently serves on the board of directors of JD.com (NASDAQ: JD; HKEx: 9618), having previously served on the board of JD Logistics (HKEx: 2618). Li co-founded Lean In China, a professional support network that has grown to over 100,000 women across China. Li graduated cum laude from Yale University with dual B.A. degrees in Economics and International Studies and holds a J.D. from Stanford Law School; she is admitted to practice law in New York and the District of Columbia.

== See also ==
- Bank of East Asia
- Four big families of Hong Kong
