= Leung Tat-shing =

Hong Kong trade unionist

Leung Tat-shing, OBE, JP (Chinese: 梁達誠; born 1913 or 1916) was a Hong Kong trade unionist and was the first labour representative to be appointed unofficial member of the Legislative Council of Hong Kong.

== Life and career ==
He was born in Hong Kong in 1913. He studied at the King's College, Hong Kong from 1948 to 1952. He received a certificate in public health from the Royal Society for Public Health and a certificate in tropical medicine from the Royal Society.

He had been chairman of the Public Health Inspectors' Association and the Kowloon General Union of the Urban Services Department. He was also the English secretary of the Hong Kong and Kowloon Trades Union Council. In 1971, he was elected to be the Hong Kong representative to the 7th Asian Congress of the International Labour Organization. From 1971 to 1981, he was member of the Labour Advisory Board, to advise the government on the labour issues.

In 1976, he became the first labour representative to be appointed to the Legislative Council of Hong Kong by Governor Sir Murray MacLehose along with Wong Lam from the working-class background and other church representative Rev. Patrick Terence McGovern and social workers.

Legislative Council of Hong Kong
New seat	Unofficial Member; 1976–1980	Succeeded by Chan Kam-chuen
