= Xian Yuqing =

Chinese academic, poet and painter (1895–1965)

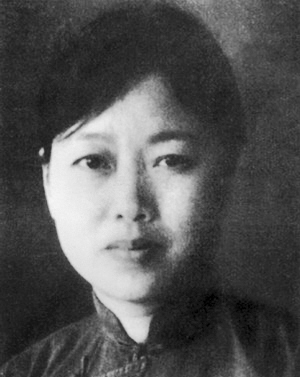
- Native name: 冼玉清
- Born: January 10, 1895; Macau
- Died: October 2, 1965 (aged 70)

Xian Yuqing (January 10, 1895 – October 2, 1965; Chinese: 冼玉清) was a Macau-born Chinese historian, poet, and painter. She is best known for her work on the history and culture of Guangdong, with her publications including an early chronicle of women writers in the province in 1941.

== Biography ==
Xian Yuqing was born in 1895 in Macau. Her family was originally from Xiqiao, in the Nanhai District of China's Guangdong province. She was one of eight children born to a couple from Guangdong who had moved to Macau during the Taiping Rebellion. As a teenager, Xian decided to focus on her education and career, choosing to never marry or have children.

Xian attended the Guangen School in Macau beginning in 1907, graduating in 1913. She then attended St. Stephen's Girls' College in Hong Kong beginning in 1916, where she studied English. She subsequently attended Lingnan University's high school from 1918 to 1920, then studied education at the university, teaching Chinese and history at the attached high school, and graduating in 1924.

She stayed on staff at Lingnan University for many years, teaching Chinese literature and curating the university's museum. As an academic, she focused on historical documents in Guangdong, producing various academic publications from the 1930s onward. Then, in the 1950s, she was accused of spying and eventually resigned, as her health had declined amid the ordeal.

Xian was also known for her work as a poet and a painter. She published several books, including A New Lease on Life (Gengsheng ji) in 1936. Her best-known book is perhaps Guangdong nuzi yiwen kao (1941), which included biographies of women poets from Guangdong.

Her final book, Studies of Written Material Relating to Guangdong (Guangdong wenxian congtan), was published in May 1965. She died in October 1965 at the age of 70.
