= Denis Bray =

Hong Kong civil servant (1926–2005)

Denis Bray CBE, CVO, JP

Secretary for Home Affairs
- In office 1973–1977
- Governor: Sir Murray MacLehose
- Preceded by: Jack Cater
- Succeeded by: Li Fook Kow
- In office 1980–1984
- Governor: Sir Murray MacLehose; Sir Edward Youde
- Preceded by: Li Fook Kow

Personal details
- Born: 24 January 1926 Hong Kong
- Died: 8 July 2005 (aged 78) Oxfordshire, England
- Spouse: Majorie Elizabeth Bottomley
- Children: 5
- Education: Kingswood School; Jesus College, Cambridge
- Occupation: Civil servant

Denis Campbell Bray, CVO CBE JP (Chinese: 黎敦義; 24 January 1926 – 8 July 2005) was a senior British colonial civil servant in Hong Kong. He was Secretary for Home Affairs from 1973 to 1977 and again from 1980 to 1984.

== Early life and education ==
Bray was born on 24 January 1926 at the Matilda Hospital in Hong Kong to Rev. Arthur Henry Bray and Edith Muriel. His father was a missionary working in Fat Shan who ran the Wah Ying School. He went to school in Fat Shan and Chefoo (now Yantai) before he went abroad to attend the Kingswood School and Jesus College, Cambridge. He served in the Royal Navy from 1947 to 1949.

== Civil service career ==
Bray was appointed a Hong Kong cadet in 1950. He was posted as Assistant Secretary for Chinese Affairs due to his fluency in Cantonese. He first made his presence following the Shek Kip Mei fire on the Christmas Day in 1953, in which he gate-crashed a meeting convened by Governor Sir Alexander Grantham at 6am on the next day, to ask the Governor to resettle the 50,000 homeless people left by the fire. He was subsequently Assistant Secretary of the Colonial Secretariat in 1953. In 1954 he was appointed District Officer of Tai Po until 1956. He was Assistant Director of Urban Services and was the Secretary of the Special Duties Unit dealing with the Hong Kong 1967 Leftist riots.

Bray became District Commissioner in the New Territories in 1971. In 1973 he became Secretary for Home Affairs, a position he held until 1977, and again from 1980 to 1984. In the intervening years (1977 to 1980) he served as the Hong Kong Commissioner in London. During his tenure as Secretary for Home Affairs, he occasionally acted as Governor. He oversaw the establishment of the District Boards, which were set up under Governor Sir Murray MacLehose's District Administration Scheme.

For his public services he was made Commander of the Royal Victorian Order in 1975 and Commander of the Order of the British Empire in 1977.

== Retirement ==
After his retirement from the government, Bray remained active in Hong Kong public life. He served as chairman of the English Schools Foundation from 1985 to 1991, presiding over the Maurice Millard incident of 1991, and was also chairman of the Jubilee Sports Centre between 1985 and 1989. He was director of the Hong Kong Philharmonic from 1985 and executive director of the Community Chest of Hong Kong from 1985 to 1992. He was the president of the Hong Kong Yachting Association between 1989 and 1991. Besides that, he also held several business positions including the directorship of First Pacific Davies Ltd., Herald Holdings Ltds, and Leighton Asia Ltd.

== Personal life ==
He married Majorie Elizabeth Bottomley, who was also born in Hong Kong, in 1952, by whom he had one son Rupert and four daughters, Jennifer, Alison, Diana and Lucy. His younger brother was the Labour Party MP Jeremy Bray. He wrote an autobiography, Hong Kong Metamorphosis, which was published in 2001. He died of blood cancer in Oxfordshire, England on 8 July 2005.

== Bibliography ==
- Bray, Denis (2001). Hong Kong Metamorphosis. Hong Kong: Hong Kong University Press. ISBN 9789622095502.

Government offices
Preceded by Jack Cater	Secretary for Home Affairs; 1973–1977	Succeeded by Li Fook Kow
Preceded by Li Fook Kow	Secretary for Home Affairs; 1980–1984	Position abolished
