= St. Stephen's Girls' College =

Secondary school in Hong Kong

St Stephen's Girls' College
- Chinese: 聖士提反女子中學

Location
- 2 Lyttelton Road, Mid-Levels, Hong Kong; 22°17′01″N 114°08′38″E

Information
- School type: Primary and secondary
- Motto: In Faith Go Forward; Chinese: 本信而進前
- Denomination: Anglican
- Established: 1906; 120 years ago
- School district: Central and Western District
- President: The Revd. KOON Ho Ming Peter Douglas (Chairman & Supervisor)
- Principal: Ms Liza Lam
- Staff: 71
- Grades: F.1 – F.6 (Equivalent of Grades 7–12)
- Gender: Female
- Enrollment: 840
- Classes offered: 30
- Area: approx. 930 square metres (10,000 sq ft)
- Colours: Royal blue, sky blue, red and cobalt blue
- Newspaper: Vortex Chinese: 漩思
- Yearbook: News Echo Chinese: 珏聲
- Affiliations: Hong Kong St. Stephen's Church; Alliance of Girls' Schools Australasia
- Website: www.ssgc.edu.hk

St. Stephen's Girls' College
- Traditional Chinese: 聖士提反女子中學
Transcriptions
Standard Mandarin
- Hanyu Pinyin: Shèng Shìtífǎn Nǚzǐ Zhōngxué
Yue: Cantonese
- Yale Romanization: Sing sih tàih fáan néuih jí jūng hohk
- Jyutping: Sing3 si6 tai4 faan2 neoi5 zi2 zung1 hok6

St Stephen's Girls' College (SSGC) (Chinese: 聖士提反女子中學) is a grant school in Hong Kong under the Hong Kong Sheng Kung Hui (Anglican Church). Established in 1906, SSGC is a top girls' school and among the oldest schools in Hong Kong. It is managed by the St. Stephen's Girls' College School Council.

== History ==
St. Stephen's Girls' College was founded in 1906 by the Church Missionary Society (CMS) of the Anglican Church, with support from prominent local Chinese leaders including Ho Kai and Tso Seen-wan. It was established as one of the first schools in Hong Kong dedicated to providing secondary education for Chinese women.

Initially located on Caine Road, the school moved briefly to Babington Path before relocating to its permanent campus on Lyttelton Road in 1923. The foundation stone of the main building was laid by H.R.H. the Prince of Wales during his tour in 1922, and the official opening was officiated by Lady Stubbs, wife of Governor Reginald Edward Stubbs.

During the Battle of Hong Kong in December 1941, the campus was converted into an emergency hospital to treat casualties from Queen Mary Hospital and Nethersole Hospital. Modern Chinese writer Xiao Hong was treated at the temporary facility prior to her death in 1942. In 1943, during the Japanese occupation of Hong Kong, Japanese forces seized the premises and converted it into Toa Gakuin (East Asia Institute), an administrative and language training school.

Following WWII, the school reopened in 1945. The Junior School Building was added in 1949, followed by the Jubilee Building in 1958.

In 2001, the school was one of a group of "traditional elite schools" criticized by Secretary for Education and Manpower Fanny Law regarding reliance on rote teaching, a characterization that school staff and stakeholders actively contested.

== Public Examination Results ==
=== Hong Kong Certificate of Education Examination (HKCEE) ===
St. Stephen's Girls' College is one of the 37 secondary schools in Hong Kong that have ever produced perfect achievers of 10As (10 distinctions) in the history of Hong Kong Certificate of Education Examination (HKCEE).

Year 2008: Ma Yiming.

=== Hong Kong Diploma of Secondary Education Examination (HKDSE) ===
St. Stephen's Girls' College is one of the 46 secondary schools in Hong Kong that have ever produced "Top Scorers" in Hong Kong Diploma of Secondary Education Examination (HKDSE). "Top Scorers" are candidates who obtained perfect scores of Level 5** in each of the four core subjects and three electives. "Super Top Scorers" are Top Scorers who have also obtained an additional Level 5** in Extended Module (M1/M2) apart from a Level 5** in Mathematics Compulsory Part.

Year 2021: Jodie Chan Lok Yung.

== School buildings ==
The Main Building of St. Stephen's Girls' College (renamed the June Li Building in 1998) was declared a declared monument under the Antiquities and Monuments Ordinance on 28 February 1992.

The four-storey structure consists of East and West Wings enclosing a central school hall. Built with granite and red brick, the structure incorporates late Edwardian design elements alongside traditional Chinese architectural features, such as pitched roofs finished with Chinese pan-and-roll tiles and a central courtyard layout reminiscent of traditional Chinese residential architecture.

== Notable alumni ==
- Rita Fan (Fan Hsu Lai-tai) – First President of the SAR Legislative Council of Hong Kong
- Regina Ip (Ip Lau Suk-yee) – Convenor of the Executive Council of Hong Kong and member of the Legislative Council
- Ellen Li (Li Ts'o Sau-kuan) – Women's rights activist and the first female member of the Legislative Council of Hong Kong
- Sandra Ng – Hong Kong film actress and director
- Xian Yuqing – Scholar, poet, and historian
