= Chan Kam-chuen =

Chan Kam-chuen OBE, JP
- 陳鑑泉

Unofficial Member of the Legislative Council
- In office 1 October 1980 – 25 August 1988
- Appointed by: Sir Murray MacLehose; Sir Edward Youde
- Preceded by: Leung Tat-shing

Personal details
- Born: 15 June 1925 Hong Kong
- Died: 6 February 2017 (aged 91) Vancouver, British Columbia, Canada
- Spouse: Chan Hong Sau-chun
- Children: 3
- Education: La Salle College; Hendon College; Cranfield School of Management
- Occupation: Trade unionist, legislator and company director

Chan Kam-chuen, OBE, JP (Chinese: 陳鑑泉; 15 June 1925 – 6 February 2017) was an appointed member of the Legislative Council of Hong Kong from 1980 to 1988.

== Career ==
Chan was born in Hong Kong and attended La Salle College. His study was interrupted by the Japanese occupation of Hong Kong from 1941 to 1945. After the war, he began his working career at the Cable & Wireless PLC.

He set up the Cable and Wireless Staff Association in 1970 and became one of its leaders until 1975. The association negotiated with the company and successfully gained the collective bargaining. In April 1973 when Chan was the chairman and deliberately demoted, the association called for work-to-rule and made the company agree to negotiate. When the negotiation broke down in October, the association called for a go-slow and sit-in and the company dismissed 53 workers which made the association going back to the negotiation table. The incident probably led to the introduction of the "cooling off period". Until the end of 1973 both sides agreed to hook the workers' wage to the civil servants.

Chan began to be appointed by the government in various public offices. In 1980, he was appointed by Governor Murray MacLehose to the Legislative Council, to replace the vacant seat left by Leung Tat-shing of the Hong Kong and Kowloon Trades Union Council. Before he was appointed to the council, he was made Justice of Peace. He became the special Adviser to director for the Cable & Wireless PLC and director of the Hong Kong Telephone Co. Ltd. and Kowloon-Canton Railway Corporation later on.

He also held many public positions, including member of Green Mini-bus Operators Selection Board, Fish Marketing Advisory Board, Fisheries Development Loan Fund Advisory Committee, Labour Advisory Board, Public Accounts Committee, Transport Advisory Committee, Vocational Training Council, Working Group of the Transport Advisory Committee on China Motor Bus Maintenance, UMELCO Police Group. He was also chairman of the Correctional Services Children's Education Committee and the Protection of Wages on Insolvency Fund Board.

== Sino-British agreement ==
Before the British prime minister Margaret Thatcher's visit to Beijing to discuss the sovereignty of Hong Kong after 1997, Chan with Chung Sze-yuen and also Li Fook-wo and Lydia Dunn were the delegates of the Unofficial Members of the Executive and Legislative Council flew to London and reflect the views of Hong Kong people.

On the debate of the Sino-British Joint Declaration in October 1984, Chan and John Joseph Swaine were the only members of the Legislative Council abstained from voting for the draft agreement. He expressed his reasons:

Of the 5.3 million people, about 2.6 million are Hong Kong born. The remaining 2.7 million mostly came to Hong Kong from mainland China during the various political movements. For people who live in a society governed by the rule of law, it is difficult to understand the turmoil which these people underwent. Some of them were suddenly deprived of all their earthly possessions and found that their own children turned into their prosecutors on a charge which is non-existent. Neighbours and relatives turned into witnesses and the mob is the judge. The earth seemed to have open under their feet and heaven came down like a collapsed ceiling. If they survived, their value of life would change and were willing to swim across shark-infested waters to come to Hong Kong for freedom. Hence, one does not see dancing and celebrations in the streets of Hong Kong when the settlement of their future is announced.

Chan was awarded the Officer of the Order of the British Empire in June 1984 and was reappointed to the Legislative Council after the first general election of the Legislative Council in 1985. he served as the chairman of the Vocational Training Council after Francis Tien.

Chan was the only appointed member who against the amendment of the Public Order Ordinance to extend the charge to news media in 1986. He also opposed the government's decision on turning down the demand for direct election in 1988 and protest by walking out the chamber after his speech, stating that "I have to walk out on the two days' debate on the White Paper to reflect adequately the anger, and frustration of the majority outside this Chamber, be they vocal or silent" and becoming the first Legislative Council member to do so in Hong Kong history. He was not appointed again after the 1988 Legislative Council election.

He later emigrated to Canada. He died on 6 February 2017 in Vancouver, British Columbia, aged 91.
