= Ellen Li =

Ellen Li Shu-pui CBE JP
- 李樹培夫人
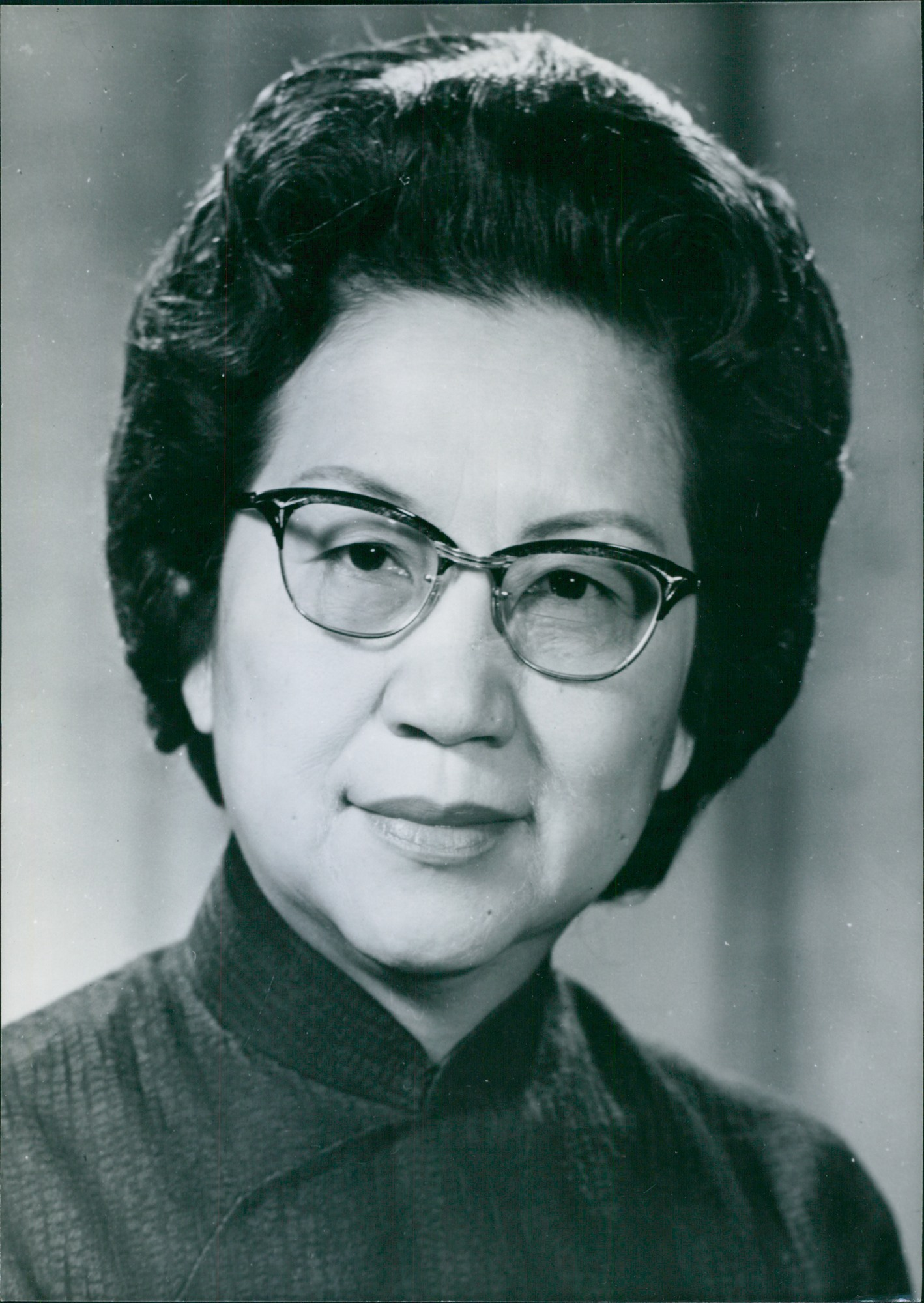

Unofficial Member of the Legislative Council of Hong Kong
- In office 1 July 1966 – 20 June 1973
- Appointed by: Sir David Trench
- Preceded by: Sir Kwan Cho-yiu

Personal details
- Born: Ts'o Sau-kuan; 22 July 1908 Saigon, French Indochina
- Died: 2 June 2005 (aged 96) Hong Kong
- Spouse: Li Shu-pui (m. 1936; died 2005)
- Children: 2 sons and 1 daughter
- Education: St. Stephen's Girls' College
- Alma mater: University of Shanghai (BBA)
- Occupation: Politician

Ellen Li Shu-pui CBE JP (Chinese: 李樹培夫人; born Ts'o Sau-kuan; 22 July 1908 – 2 June 2005) was a politician in Hong Kong. She is best known as the first woman to be appointed to the Legislative Council of Hong Kong.

== Early life and education ==
Li was born Ts'o Sau-kuan in 1908 in Saigon, Vietnam. She was educated at the St. Stephen's Girls' College and was among the first women to study business administration at the University of Shanghai. After her education, she worked at the Chinese Maritime Customs before she moved to Hong Kong in 1934. She married Dr. Li Shu-pui, younger brother of Dr. Li Shu-fan, in 1936.

== Public life ==
During the depression years of the 1930s Hong Kong, she worked in the social services and founded the Hong Kong Chinese Women's Club and the Hong Kong Council of Women. She also encouraged and extended the activities of the Young Women's Christian Association, repeatedly serving as president. She also worked in the Family Planning Association and many government committees. She was made member of the Court of the University of Hong Kong in 1948. She was diagnosed with breast cancer in 1962 and was cured after receiving a series of operations.

She was made Justice of the Peace in 1948. In 1964, she was appointed member of the Urban Council of Hong Kong, the first woman to be appointed to the Council. She became the first woman to be appointed to the Legislative Council of Hong Kong in 1965 as a provisional member during the absence of Dhun Jehangir Ruttonjee, and was appointed in July 1966 in place of Kwan Cho-yiu in which she held the position until 1973. She was instrumental in passing the 1971 Marriage (Amendment) Bill, which abolished the polygamy by virtue of the Great Qing Legal Code.

For her services, she received a Doctor of Laws honorary degree. She was awarded Member of the Order of the British Empire (MBE) in 1958 and Officer of the Order of the British Empire in 1964. She became the first woman to receive Commander of the Order of the British Empire (CBE) in 1974. In 1999, she was named Hall of Fame of the International Women's Forum (IWF).

== Family and death ==
In 1936, Ellen Li married Dr. Li Shu-pui (1903–2005), younger brother of Dr. Li Shu-fan. Dr. Li Shu-pui was the chairman of the Hong Kong Sanatorium and Hospital.

The couple had three children, one daughter and two sons. One of her children is Dr Walton Li Wai-tat, who went on to become superintendent of the University of Hong Kong.

Ellen Li died at the age of 96, on 2 June 2005.
