= Hong Kong Sanatorium & Hospital =

- Hong Kong Sanatorium & Hospital Limited
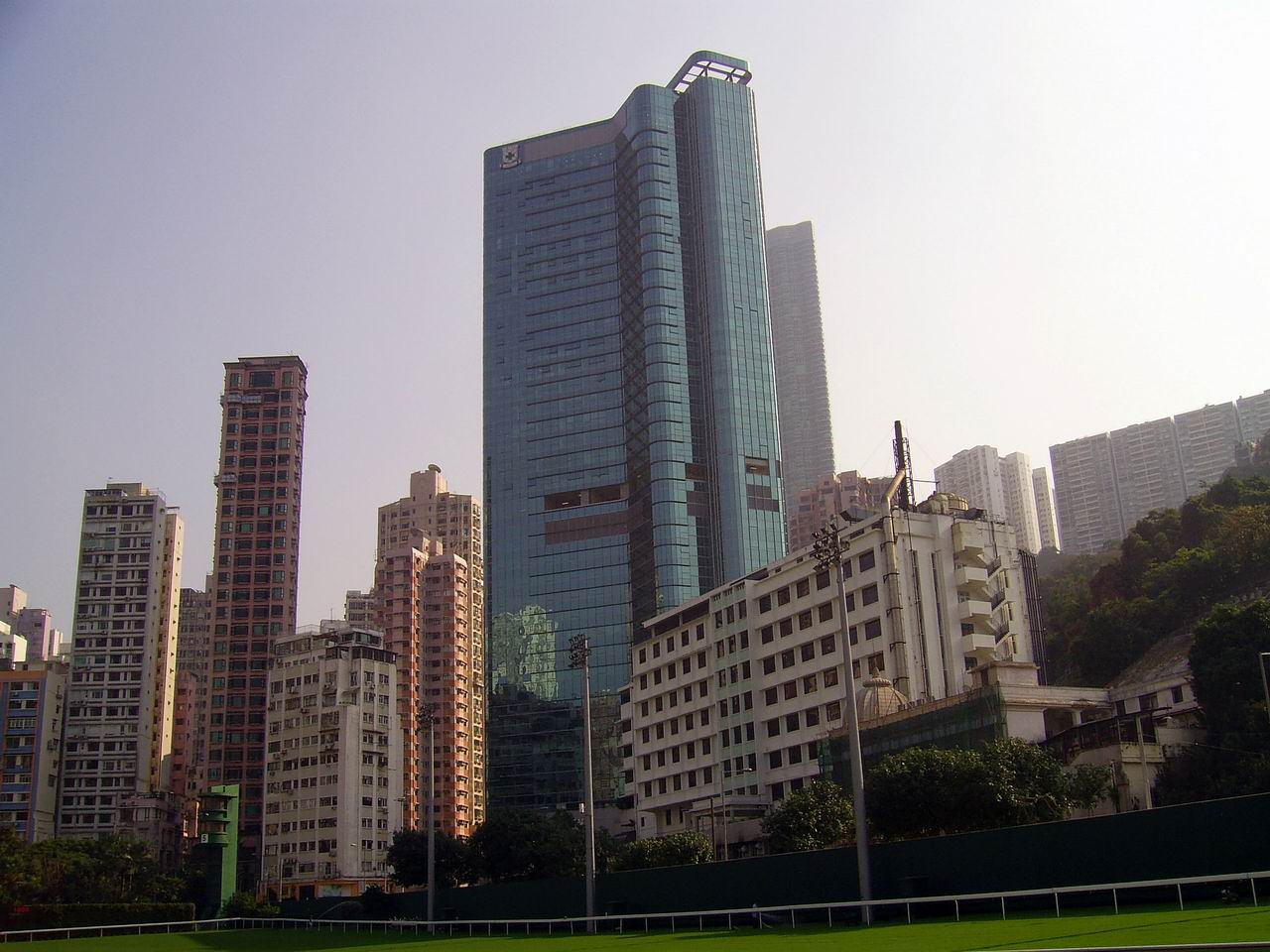
- Hong Kong Sanatorium & Hospital (center glass building and adjacent white building)

- Location within Hong Kong

Geography
- Location: 2 Village Road, Happy Valley, Hong Kong
- Coordinates: 22°16′10″N 114°10′59″E

Organisation
- Care system: Private
- Type: District General, Teaching
- Affiliated university: University of Hong Kong Hong Kong Metropolitan University

Services
- Emergency department: No Accident & Emergency
- Beds: 480

History
- Founded: 1922; 104 years ago

Links
- Website: www.hksh.com
- Lists: Hospitals in Hong Kong

Hong Kong Sanatorium & Hospital
- Traditional Chinese: 養和醫院
- Simplified Chinese: 养和医院
- Literal meaning: Yeung Wo Hospital
Transcriptions
Standard Mandarin
- Hanyu Pinyin: Yǎng Hé Yīyuàn
Yue: Cantonese
- Yale Romanization: Yéuhng wòh yī yuhn
- Jyutping: Joeng5 wo4 ji1 jyun6*2

Hong Kong Sanatorium & Hospital, or HKSH, is a private hospital established in 1922 in Happy Valley, Hong Kong.

HKSH has a School of Nursing, affiliated with Hong Kong Metropolitan University, which trains nurses up to degree level. It is affiliated with the Li Ka Shing Faculty of Medicine of the University of Hong Kong and provides clinical attachment opportunities for HKU medical students.

With a height of 148.5 metres (487 ft), it is the seventh-highest hospital building in the world, being 15 centimetres (5.9 in) shorter than Guy's Hospital in London.

== History ==
The hospital was founded in 1922 (known then as The Yeung Wo Nursing Home) by a group of Chinese medical practitioners and residents of Hong Kong. The aim was to provide hospital facilities for the Chinese community, and to provide accessible accommodation for patients to be cared for by their own doctors.

A popular public amusement centre in Happy Valley, known as "The Happy Retreat", was acquired for the location of the hospital. The hospital opened its doors in September 1922 with 28 beds. Dr. Wai-Cheung Chau (1893–1965) served as its Superintendent, and Dr. Lee Sun Chau (1890–1979) served as the Matron of the hospital.

Four years after the opening, a landslip occurred on the hill slope behind the two buildings, causing considerable damage. The nursing home had to be closed for some six months in order that the premises could be made habitable for admission of patients.

Dr. Li Shu Fan, who had just returned to Hong Kong after serving as head of Kung Yee University Medical School in Canton, was chosen to lead the hospital in 1926. It was under his leadership that the name of the nursing home was changed to its present form, Hong Kong Sanatorium and Hospital. Dr LI Wai Tat, Walton is now the current Medical Superintendent of HKSH, and chief executive officer of HKSH Medical Group.

== See also ==
- List of hospitals in Hong Kong
