= Kung Yee Medical School and Hospital =

Hospital in Guangzhou, China

The Kung Yee Medical School and Hospital in Guangzhou (then called Canton), China was a hospital and medical school founded in 1908 by a dozen Chinese citizens and led by American Dr. Paul Jerome Todd (1873-1939) and opened in temporary site in 1909.

The hospital second site and the first permanent home was located by the river; it had 60 beds and was completed in 1911. A third site was located just outside of the city's east gate (Tung Guan), a 20 acres plot acquired by the government in 1912. Built from 1914 to 1917 it had 98 beds.

Unlike many missionary-sponsored institutions of the time, its directors were all Chinese, and only 4 of the 24 members of the faculty were not Chinese. In 1913, there were 122 male and 37 female students.

Dr. Li Shu Fan was the head of Kung Yee from 1923 to 1924.

In 1925, the Kung Yee institutions were taken over by the government and became the Medical Department of the 1st Chung Shan University, which became the Sun Yat-sen University Medical School.
