= Bank of East Asia =

Independent local Hong Kong bank

The Bank of East Asia Limited
- Type: Public
- Traded as: SEHK: 23
- Industry: Finance
- Founded: Incorporated on 14 November 1918; 107 years ago; Officially opened on 4 January 1919; 107 years ago
- Headquarters: 10 Des Voeux Road Central, Central, Hong Kong
- Key people: Sir David K.P. Li (Executive Chairman); Adrian M.K. Li (Co-Chief Executive Officer); Brian M.B. Li (Co-Chief Executive Officer)
- Products: Financial services consumer banking corporate banking investment banking private banking
- Operating income: ▲HKD17.1 billion (2018)
- Net income: ▼HKD6.5 billion (2018)
- Total assets: ▲HKD839 billion (2018)
- Website: hkbea.com

Bank of East Asia Ltd.
- Traditional Chinese: 東亞銀行有限公司
- Simplified Chinese: 东亚银行有限公司
Transcriptions
Yue: Cantonese
- Yale Romanization: Dūng a ngàhn hòhng yáuh haahn gūng sī
- Jyutping: Dung^{1} aa^{3} ngan^{4} hong^{4} jau^{5} haan^{6} gung^{1} si^{1}

BEA
- Traditional Chinese: 東亞銀行
- Simplified Chinese: 东亚银行
- Literal meaning: Bank of East Asia
Transcriptions
Yue: Cantonese
- Yale Romanization: Dūng a ngàhn hòhng
- Jyutping: Dung^{1} aa^{3} ngan^{4} hong^{4}

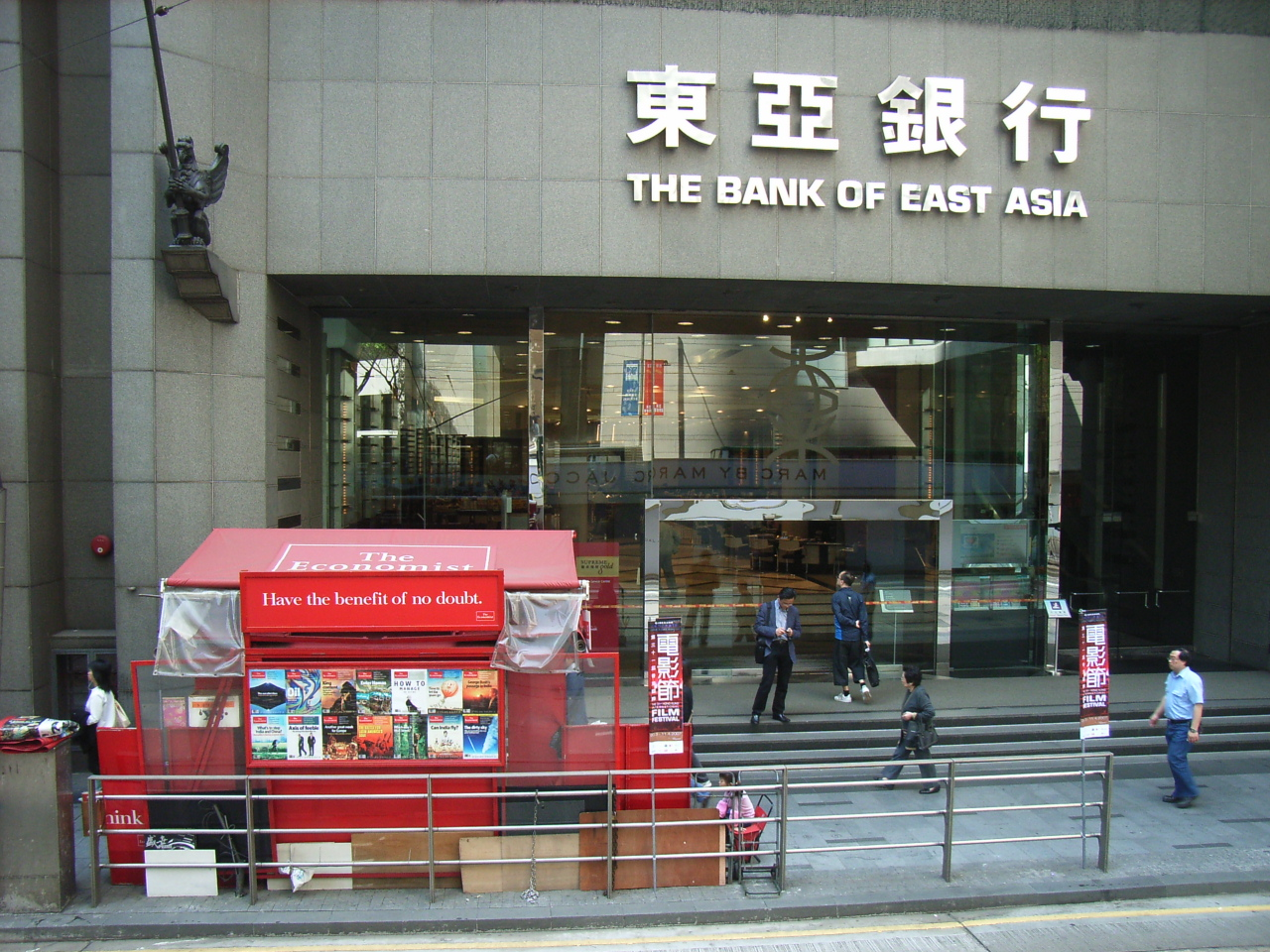
The Bank of East Asia Building, Des Voeux Road Central, in Central, Hong Kong.

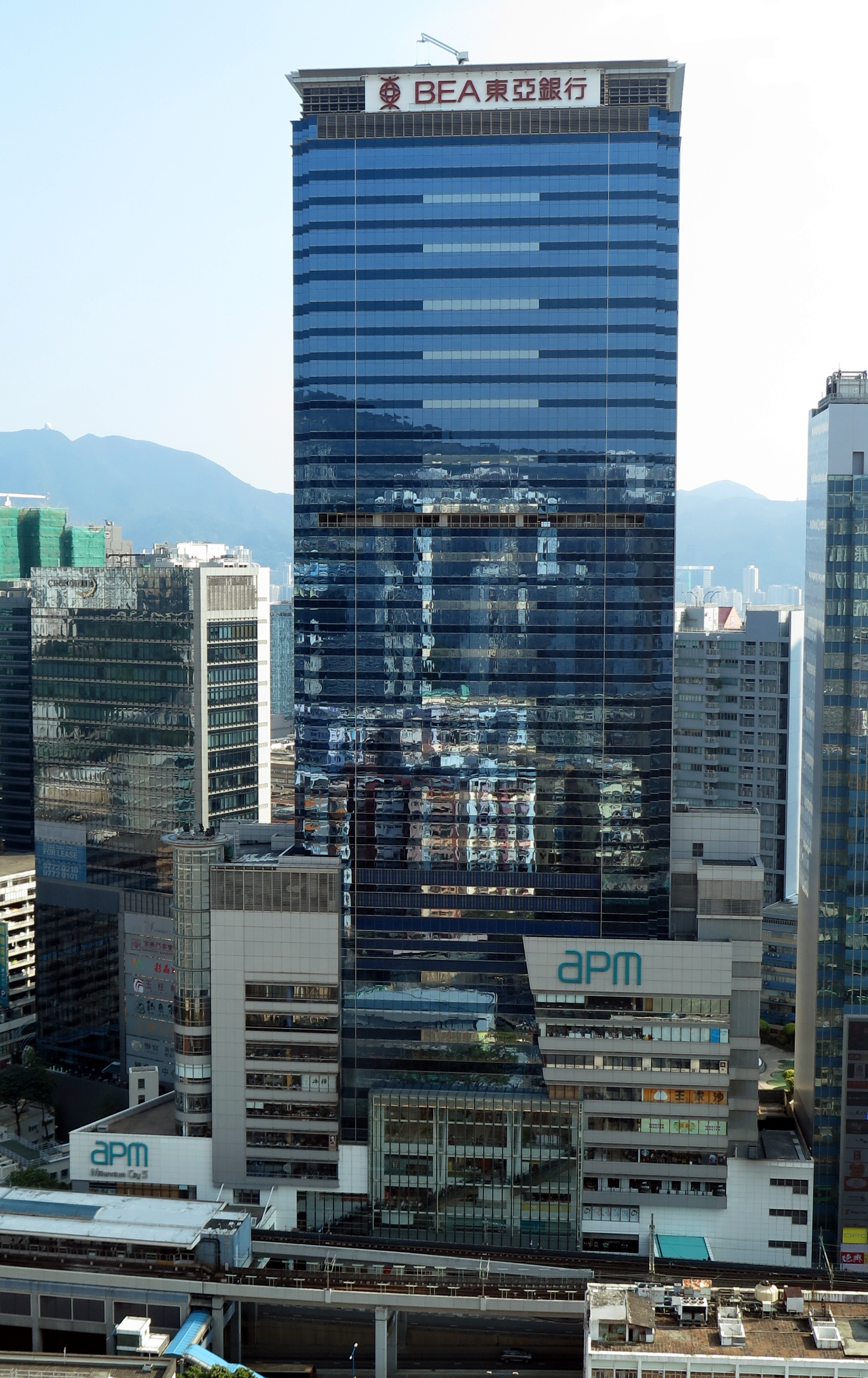
BEA tower in Kwun Tong, Hong Kong

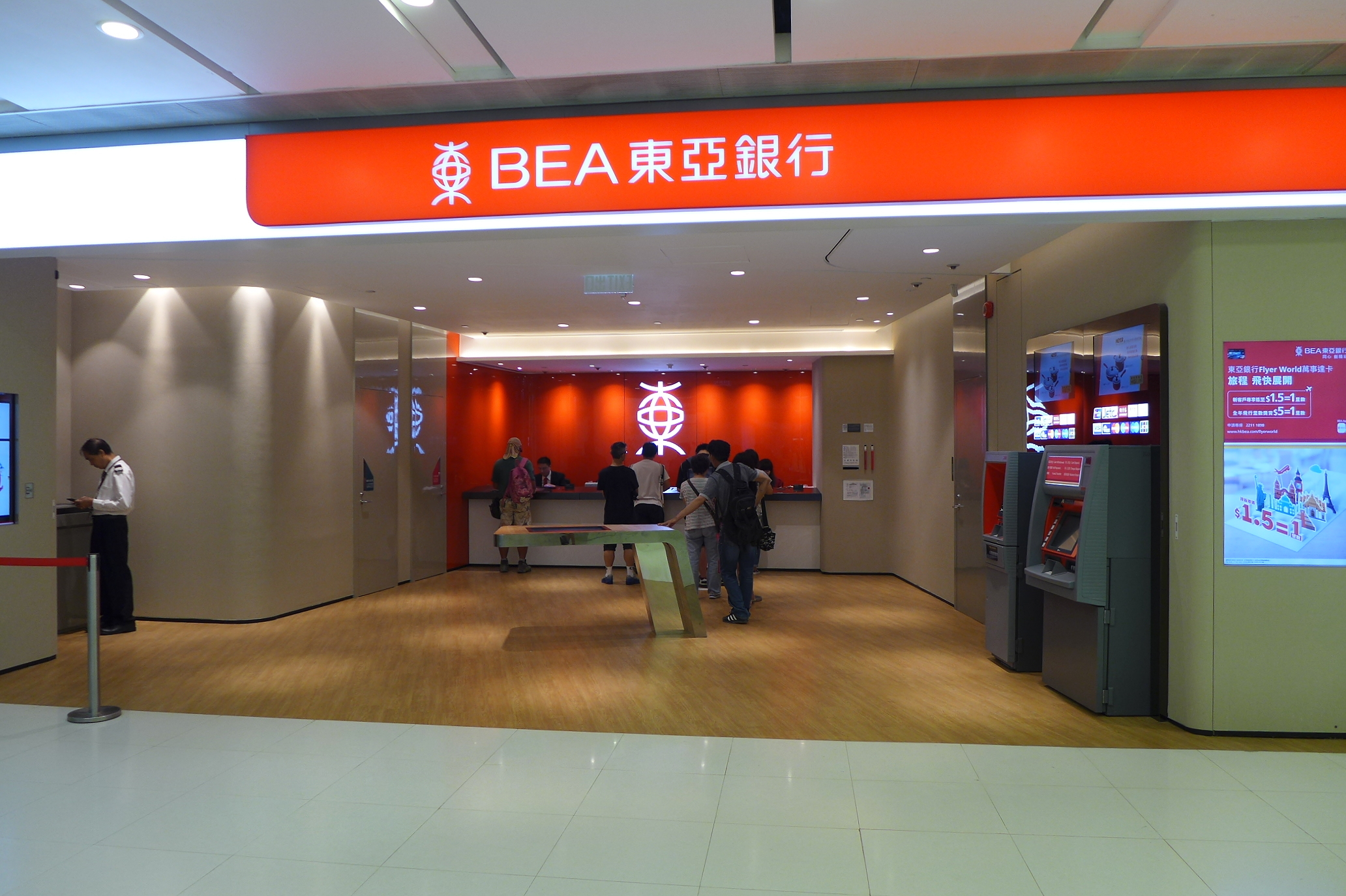
A BEA Branch in Hong Kong

The Bank of East Asia Limited, often abbreviated to BEA, is a Hong Kong public banking and financial services company headquartered in Central, Hong Kong. It is currently the largest independent local Hong Kong bank, and one of two remaining family-run Hong Kong banks, with the other being Dah Sing Bank. It continues to be run by the 3rd and 4th generations of the Li family.

It was incorporated as a publicly listed bank in Hong Kong on 14 November 1918, and officially opened for business on 4 January 1919, by a group of local Hong Kong Chinese businessmen who "not only understood modern banking, but the needs of modern Chinese business." Essentially, it aimed to serve local Hong Kong citizens and businesses who were currently underserved by the large British banks and small, unorganized, and often unincorporated local Hong Kong moneylenders. By the 1930s, BEA was considered the most influential local Hong Kong bank in the city.

== History ==
=== Origins, and until 2008 ===
BEA was co-founded in Hong Kong on 14 November 1918 and officially opened for business on 4 January 1919. The idea of a local Hong Kong bank to blend East and West, essentially by embracing the style of a Chinese, family-run bank but also adopting modern accounting and banking methods, came from Kan Tong-po (簡東浦). Kan had the necessary banking background but needed the financial support of the Li brothers (Li Koon-chun and Li Tse-fong) and the sociopolitical support of Sir Shouson Chow, who would become co-founders, along with several other prominent local Hong Kong Chinese businessmen, including Fung Ping Shan (馮平山).

While Kan later sold his stake in the bank in the run-up to Hong Kong's handover, the Li family's influence in the bank continues to run deep today, with Sir David Li (3rd generation) being chairman, and his sons Adrian Li and Brian Li (4th generation) being co-CEOs.

BEA expanded rapidly internationally after opening. In 1920, just one year after the bank's official opening, BEA opened its first branches outside of Hong Kong, in Shanghai and Ho Chi Minh City. In 1952, BEA opened its Singapore branch, located in Raffles Place at 60 Robinson Road. BEA would later enter the North American market in 1991 (though operations would later be sold to Industrial and Commercial Bank of China in January 2010), and mainland China in 1992.

The late 1930s to 1940s were tough on the bank, as the Second Sino-Japanese War and later Japanese occupation of Hong Kong resulted in heavy losses, with many of BEA's assets seized. Even after the war, the Chinese Civil War and later the United Nations embargo on China negatively affected Hong Kong's economy, and as a result, BEA.

In 1965, Hong Kong experienced a city-wide banking crisis which saw other local Hong Kong banks suffer bank runs and hostile takeovers, such as Hang Seng Bank. BEA, however, was undisturbed but became much more conservative thereafter.

In 1984, after the Sino-British Joint Declaration, BEA refused to follow the lead of many leading firms at the time to move their headquarters overseas, and instead decided to double down and reaffirm their "Hong Kong roots".

Traditionally more focused on internal growth rather than external acquisitions, in 1995, BEA made its first acquisition when it acquired United Chinese Bank (simplified Chinese: 中国联合银行; traditional Chinese: 中國聯合銀行), with the merger being completed in 2001. BEA also acquired First Pacific Bank in 2000, and that merger was completed in 2002.

=== 2008 to 2018 ===
On 24 September 2008, BEA experienced a serious test in the form of the worst bank run in its history. BEA had to issue a statement to counter "malicious rumours" about its stability, as queues of customers seeking to withdraw funds formed outside some of its Hong Kong branches. It condemned the rumour mongers, declaring that it had sufficient funds to meet customers' requests, and noting that its capital adequacy ratio was above the industry average, at 14.6 percent. A statement by Joseph Yam, the then chief executive of the Hong Kong Monetary Authority, dismissed the rumour and strongly supported the bank, adding that funds would be made available to the bank if required but that no request had been made. Earlier in the week, the bank had been forced to restate its previous half-year's earnings downwards by nearly 12 percent after it was revealed that one of its staff had conducted unauthorised trades and then buried the losses.

In October 2015, BEA entered into agreement with Sinopac Securities to sell BEA Wealth Management Services (Taiwan) Limited and Tung Shing Holdings Company Limited. BEA chairman and CEO David Li said that the disposals would allow BEA to rationalise its securities business in Greater China region. There was no disclosure of the transaction amount involved in this sales.

As the banking sector and BEA continued to face challenges, BEA launched a 3-year cost-cutting plan in the beginning of 2016 to save HKD 700 million by 2018, by reducing dividend payouts, controlling costs, and trimming assets. The saving target was about 8% of its cost base in 2015. It was expected that 40% of savings coming from business alignment, 25% from restructuring middle to back offices, and remaining via branch automation and streamlining. By June 2016, BEA already slashed 180 jobs and closed down 22 securities brokerages outlets. Other key assets sold during this period of cost cutting included its holdings in Tricor, a professional services firm to private equity firm Permira for HKD 6.47 billion (profit of HKD 3.1 billion), and various consumer finance assets to China moneylender QL Finance for HKD 1.08 billion.

On 29 June 2018, after 34 years of being a constituent of the Hang Seng Index, BEA was cut during the quarterly review of Hang Seng Index composition, effective 10 September 2018. The index said that the Bank of East Asia did not meet the turnover and market capitalisation minimums.

In late 2018, BEA began to venture into investment banking by setting up a debt capital markets team based in Hong Kong.

=== Since 2019 ===
BEA began 2019 by celebrating its centennial on 2 January 2019, with a reception at the Hong Kong Convention and Exhibition Centre attended by various business and political leaders from Hong Kong.

On 1 July 2019, David Li stepped down as CEO after 38 years (but still retaining his Chairmanship), and was replaced by his sons Adrian and Brian Li as co-CEO's.

BEA faced a difficult 2019, with loan writedowns in China and unprecedented scale of protests in Hong Kong affecting business.

In January 2025, The bank teamed up with Guangzhou Rural Commercial Bank (GRCB) to broaden its cross-boundary wealth management (WMC) Southbound business, marking its first WMC partnership outside the BEA group.

== Business segmentation ==
BEA trades through the following segments:

- Corporate banking
- Personal banking
- Wealth management
- Insurance and retirement benefits
- Treasury markets
- China
- International divisions

== Headquarters ==
From 1918 to 1920, the bank was headquartered in 2 Des Voeux Road Central, in Central, Hong Kong. In 1920, the bank moved its headquarters to the 29-storey Bank of East Asia Building (東亞銀行大廈) located at 10 Des Voeux Road Central, standing between New Henry House and The Landmark.

The Bank of East Asia Building has had multiple rebuilds over the years:

- First generation (1920 to 1933)
- Second generation (1935 to 1980)
- Third generation (1982 to present)

== Mainland China operations ==
Bank of East Asia began its mainland China business in 1992, and in 2007, was among the 4 foreign banks approved by China Banking Regulatory Commission (CBRC) to establish a locally incorporated bank, the Bank of East Asia (China) Ltd (BEA China).

On 20 May 2008, BEA became a foreign bank that issued yuan-denominated debit cards in mainland China, taking advantage of the recent removal of a key restriction on foreign banks' retail business in the country. The bank issued the debit cards jointly with China UnionPay, the country's only bankcard network operator. The company claimed that the launch of debit cards would help attract retail banking customers by giving them greater convenience in accessing their deposits. In addition, it offers direct Alipay payment support and issues credit cards (RMB-denominated UnionPay credit cards in 2008, and more recently Visa-branded US dollar-denominated cards in April 2011).

BEA currently operate one of the most extensive networks in mainland China for a foreign bank.

== Overseas operations ==
BEA operates overseas in several locations serving expatriate Hong Kong residents.

BEA operates overseas branches in the following countries and markets:

- Macau
- Malaysia
- Singapore
- Taiwan
- United States
- United Kingdom

Former overseas branches:

- Canada (1991–2010): Retains 20% stake; sold 70% to Industrial and Commercial Bank of China in 2010 and all branches were renamed ICBC Canada in July 2010; a further 10% was sold to ICBC in 2011.

== Major shareholders ==
Major shareholders in BEA as of the 2023 annual report:

Shareholder	Percentage
Sumitomo Mitsui Banking Corporation	21.68%
Criteria Caixa Holding	19.19%
Guoco Group	16.44%
The Li family	~10.00%

== Leadership ==
=== Current Leadership ===
- Executive Chairman: David Li (since April 1997)
- Co-Chief Executives: Adrian Li and Brian Li (since July 2019)

==== List of former chairmen ====
1. Pong Wai-ting (1919–1925); co-founder
2. Shouson Chow (1925–1959); co-founder
3. Kan Tong-po (1959–1963); co-founder
4. Kan Yuet-keung (1964–1984); son of co-founder Kan Tong-po
5. Li Fook-wo (1984–1997); son of co-founder Li Tse-fong

==== List of former chief executive officers ====
The position of Chief Executive Officer was known as Chief Manager prior to 1986.

1. Kan Tong-po (1919–1963); co-founder
2. Kenneth Fung (1963–1970); co-founder
3. Kan Yuet-hing (1970–1972); son of Kan Tong-po
4. Li Fook-wo (1972–1977); son of co-founder Li Tse-fong
5. Michael Kan (1977–1981); son of co-founder Kan Tong-po
6. David Li (1981–2019); grandson of co-founder Li Koon-chun

== Disputes and incidents ==
=== Elliott Management ===
Hedge fund activist investor Elliott Management filed a lawsuit against BEA in July 2016 in Hong Kong court over a share placement transaction. Elliott Management, which held 7% of listed shares of BEA, had included majority of the bank's directors, its CEO and chairman in the lawsuit. The transaction in question was on BEA's issuance of new shares to Japan's Sumitomo Mitsui Banking Corp (SMBC) in 2015. Elliott cited "allegations of unfairly prejudicial conduct" and "alleged serious corporate governance failings". Elliott hoped to secure a declaration from the court that these placements were passed by BEA for "an improper purpose" and looked for an order requiring BEA to lift the contractual restrictions that would prevent SMBC and Caixa, another strategic investor on BEA, from reducing their stakes on BEA.

In response, BEA applied to have Elliott's petition against them struck out. This case was heard by Mr Justice Jonathan Harris from 17 to 19 July 2017.

=== 2019–20 Hong Kong protests ===
During the 2019–20 Hong Kong protests, several BEA outlets were accidentally targeted as protestors vandalized mainland-linked business. Protestors later spray-painted "Sorry" at the vandalized branches, after they realized BEA is locally run and owned.
