= Li Shu Fan =

Li Shu-fan
- 李樹芬
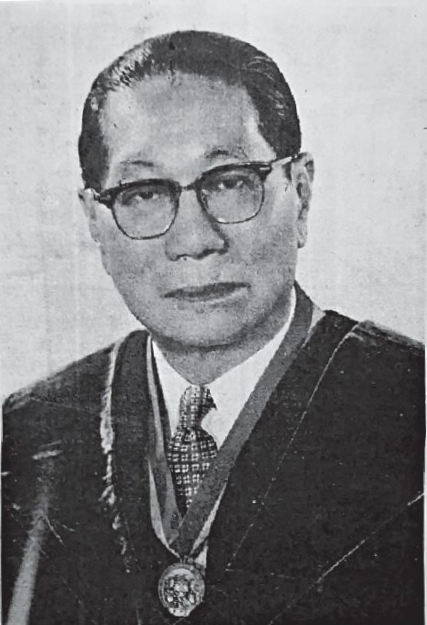

Personal details
- Born: 12 January 1887 Taishan, Guangdong, Qing dynasty
- Died: 24 November 1966 (aged 79) British Hong Kong
Li Shu Fan
- Traditional Chinese: 李樹芬
- Simplified Chinese: 李树芬
Transcriptions
Standard Mandarin
- Hanyu Pinyin: Lǐ Shùfēn
- Wade–Giles: Li^{3} Shu^{4}-fên^{1}
Yue: Cantonese
- Jyutping: Lei^{5} Syu^{6}-fan^{1}
other Yue
- Taishanese: Lei^{2} Si^{5}-fun^{1}

Li Shu-fan (1887 – 24 November 1966) was a leader of the medical profession in Hong Kong and a member of the Legislative Council of Hong Kong.

== Biography ==
He was a native of China but received his early education in the US. Li graduated from the Hong Kong College of Medicine in 1908. In 1910 he obtained the M.B., Ch.B at the University of Edinburgh.

Li was the Minister of Public Health under Sun Yat-sen (a fellow alumnus of the Hong Kong College of Medicine). He was the head of the Canton Kung Yee University Medical School in Guangzhou (then called Canton) from 1923 to 1924; he treated Mikhail Borodin at this time. In 1926, he was named to head the Yeung Wo Nursing Home, which under his leadership was reorganized and renamed to the Hong Kong Sanatorium and Hospital. He retired from medical practice in 1958, but remained chairman of the board and Medical Superintendent until his death in 1966. His younger brother Li Shu Pui succeeded him as Superintendent.

He was a member of the Hong Kong Legislative Council from 1937 to 1941.

In 1961 he donated land, estimated value 250,000 pounds, to the University of Hong Kong. A year later, he gave his life earnings (more than 80% of the shares of the Hong Kong Sanatorium) to establish the Li Shu Fan Medical Foundation for medical research and education was established in March 1962.

In 1964, he published his autobiography, Hong Kong Surgeon.

Buildings at the University of Hong Kong and Hong Kong Sanatorium & Hospital are named for him.

He is an honorary director of the Chinese Chamber of Commerce, a member of the Tung Wah Hospital Advisory Board, a member of the Medical Board, and the Sanitary Board. He was a non-official Justice of the Peace. He was also nominated as a Chinese member of the Legislative Council in 1937.

== See also ==
Ellen Li (sister-in-law)

== Additional sources ==
- University of Hong Kong, Growing With Hong Kong: The University and Its Graduates, the First 90 Years : A Convocation Project, ISBN 962-209-613-1, pp. 50, 113. excerpts
- Li Shu Fan, Hong Kong Surgeon, 1964. reviewed in Chest 45:4:448 doi:10.1378/chest.45.4.448
- T. C. Cheng, "Chinese Unofficial Members of the Legislative and Executive Councils in Hong Kong up to 1941", Journal of the Hong Kong Branch of the Royal Asiatic Society 9, 1969. (A lecture delivered to the Branch on 29 April 1968) full text

Legislative Council of Hong Kong
Preceded by Ts'o Seen-wan	Chinese Unofficial Member; 1937–1941	Succeeded by Li Tse-fong
Political offices
Preceded by Lo Man-kam	Member of the Sanitary Board; 1932–1937	Succeeded by R. A. de Castro Basto
