= Premier Wu =

Premier Wu may refer to:

- Wu Den-yih (born 1948), 23rd Premier of the Republic of China
- Wu Ting-fang (1842-1922), Acting Premier of the Republic of China
