= George H. Wu =

American judge (born 1950)

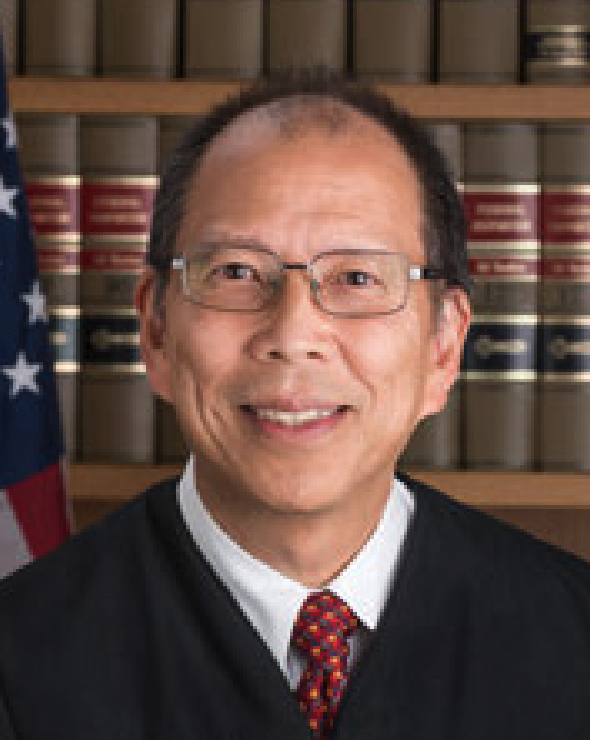

Senior Judge of the United States District Court for the Central District of California
- Incumbent
- Assumed office November 3, 2023

Judge of the United States District Court for the Central District of California
- In office April 17, 2007 – November 3, 2023
- Appointed by: George W. Bush
- Preceded by: Ronald S.W. Lew
- Succeeded by: Anne Hwang

Judge of the Los Angeles County Superior Court
- In office 1996–2007

Judge of the Los Angeles Municipal Court
- In office 1993–1996

Personal details
- Born: George Howping Wu; 1950 (age 75–76) New York City, New York, U.S.
- Parent: Sylvia Wu (mother)
- Relatives: Wu Chaoshu (grandfather); Wu Ting-fang (great-grandfather); Ho Miu-ling (great-grandmother)
- Education: Pomona College (BA); University of Chicago (JD)

George Howping Wu (born 1950) is an American senior United States district judge of the United States District Court for the Central District of California.

== Early life and education ==
Born in New York City, Wu is the grandson of Chinese diplomat Wu Chaoshu and the great-grandson of Wu Ting-fang, the first ethnically Chinese barrister in England. His mother, Sylvia Wu, was the founder of the restaurant "Madame Wu's Garden" in Santa Monica. He received a Bachelor of Arts degree from Pomona College in 1972 and a J.D. degree from the University of Chicago Law School in 1975.

== Career ==
Wu served as a law clerk for Judge Stanley Barnes of the United States Court of Appeals for the Ninth Circuit from 1976 to 1977 and in 1979. After his clerkship, Wu was in private practice in Los Angeles, California. He was also briefly an assistant professor of law at the University of Tennessee College of Law from 1979 to 1982. Additionally, he was an assistant United States attorney of the U.S. Attorney's Office for the Central District of California from 1982 to 1989 and from 1991 to 1993.

=== State judicial service ===
In 1993, Wu was appointed as a state court judge to the Los Angeles Municipal Court. In 1996, he was elevated to a California Superior Court trial judge on the Los Angeles County Superior Court and held this post until 2007.

=== Federal judicial service ===
Wu was nominated by President George W. Bush on January 9, 2007 to serve as a United States district judge of the United States District Court for the Central District of California, to a seat vacated by Judge Ronald S.W. Lew. He was confirmed by the United States Senate on March 27, 2007, and received his commission on April 17, 2007. He assumed senior status on November 3, 2023.

== See also ==
- List of Asian American jurists

Legal offices
Preceded by Ronald S.W. Lew	Judge of the United States District Court for the Central District of California; 2007–2023	Succeeded by Anne Hwang
