= Shatin Hospital =

- Hospital Authority
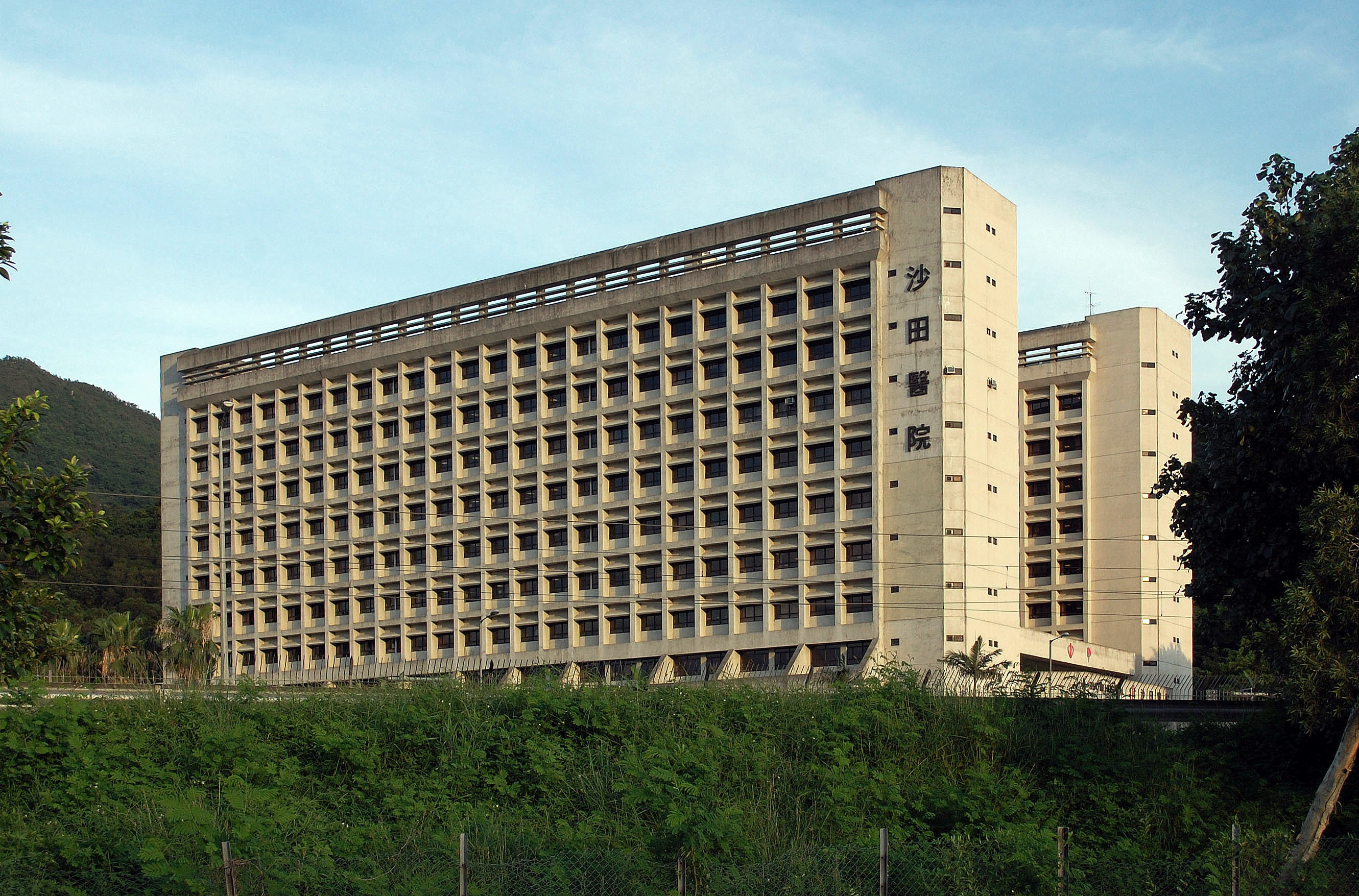
- Shatin Hospital as viewed from the Shing Mun riverbank in June 2014

- Location within Hong Kong

Geography
- Location: 33 A Kung Kok Street, Sha Tin, New Territories, Hong Kong
- Coordinates: 22°23′53″N 114°12′46″E

Organisation
- Type: Specialist
- Network: New Territories East Cluster

Services
- Emergency department: No Accident and Emergency at Prince of Wales Hospital
- Beds: 591

History
- Founded: 2 December 1991; 34 years ago

Links
- Lists: Hospitals in Hong Kong

Shatin Hospital
- Traditional Chinese: 沙田醫院
Transcriptions
Yue: Cantonese
- Yale Romanization: Sāa tìhn yī yún
- Jyutping: Saa1 tin4 ji1 jyum2

Shatin Infirmary and Convalescent Hospital
- Traditional Chinese: 沙田護養院
Transcriptions
Yue: Cantonese
- Yale Romanization: Sā1 tìhn wuh yéuhng yún
- Jyutping: Saa1 tin4 wu6 joeng5 jyun2

Shatin Hospital (Chinese: 沙田醫院; SH), formerly known as Shatin Infirmary and Convalescent Hospital, commenced operation on 2 December 1991 and has been in full function since 1 February 1994. Shatin Hospital comprises 591 beds, 144 psychiatric day places, 398 geriatric day places and 49 hospice and palliative day places. It offers services which supplement the nearby Prince of Wales Hospital, the main hospital serving the region.

The hospital is located at No. 33 A Kung Kok Street, A Kung Kok. It is surrounded by hills on three sides and it commands a view of the Shing Mun River and Penfold Park. Other institutions in close proximity include the Cheshire Home and the Bradbury Hospice.

Shatin Hospital provides services in medicine and geriatrics, surgery, adult psychiatry, psychogeriatrics, oncology and hospice care. The hospital is also equipped with a sleep assessment unit.

In line with the Hospital Authority's corporate direction of seamless healthcare, Shatin Hospital has established a Community Geriatric Assessment Team, Community Psychiatric Team and Psycho-geriatric Outreach Team. The hospital also offers a Community Psychiatric Nursing Service, which offers nursing care to patients in their own homes.

The hospital also includes a therapeutic garden and health track for convalescent patients. The facility is specially designed to enable patients to break away from the confines of the wards and indoor gymnasium to receive outdoor rehabilitation treatment in a more spacious and open garden, which will also help them to re-integrate into the community. The garden is equipped with a host of simulated transport facilities such as mock MTR train compartments, taxis and minibuses to train patients to use public transport despite physical impairment. Patients are also encouraged to use the facilities after discharge.
