= Tai Po Hospital =

- Hospital Authority
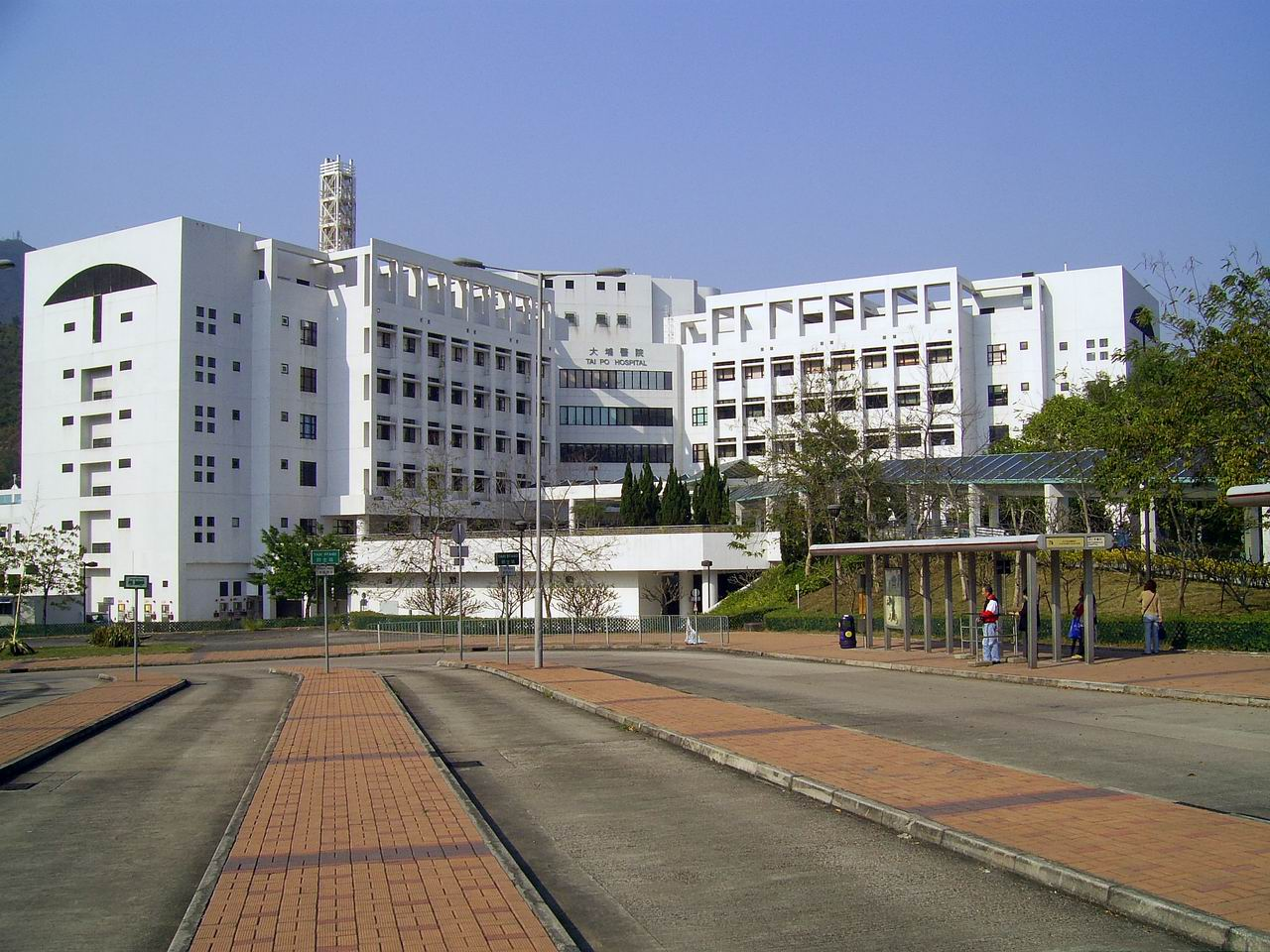

- Location within Hong Kong

Geography
- Location: 9 Chuen On Road, Tai Po, Hong Kong
- Coordinates: 22°27′40″N 114°10′29″E

Organisation
- Type: Specialist
- Network: New Territories East Cluster

Services
- Emergency department: No Accident & Emergency at Alice Ho Miu Ling Nethersole Hospital or Prince of Wales Hospital
- Beds: 992
- Speciality: Rehabilitation, psychiatric

Helipads
- Helipad: No

History
- Founded: 1998; 28 years ago

Links
- Website: www.ha.org.hk/tph
- Lists: Hospitals in Hong Kong

Tai Po Hospital
- Traditional Chinese: 大埔醫院
Transcriptions
Yue: Cantonese
- Yale Romanization: Daaih bou yī yún
- Jyutping: Daai6 bou3 ji1 jyun2

Tai Po Hospital (Chinese: 大埔醫院; TPH), located in Tai Po, Hong Kong, provides assessment, extended-care and integrated rehabilitation services to elderly, chronically-ill and acute psychiatric patients. It is also one of three designated spinal cord injury rehabilitation centres in Hong Kong.

The hospital began providing medical services in 1998.

== Facilities ==
The hospital complex has a gross floor area of about 39,000 square metres (420,000 sq ft) and consists of the Main Block and the Multicentre. As of March 2021, the hospital has a total of 1,026 beds, of which 433 are general (acute and convalescent) beds, 233 infirmary beds and 360 psychiatric beds. There are also much open space for exercise and physical activities for patients.
