= SPHC =

SPHC may refer to:

== Healthcare ==
- Selective Primary Health Care, a healthcare strategy for developing countries proposed in 1979
- Society for the Promotion of Hospice Care, a healthcare non-profit organisation based in Hong Kong, China

== Techonogy ==
- Hot Rolled Mild Steel Plates, Sheets and Strip, a Japanese industrial standard for hot rolled steel

== Other uses ==
- Southern Pacific Hotels Corporation, a New Zealand hotel operator. See Crowne Plaza, Christchurch and Waitomo Glowworm Caves
