= Kai Ho =

Hong Kong barrister (1859–1914)

Sir Kai Ho
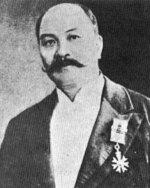
- Born: 21 March 1859; British Hong Kong
- Died: 21 July 1914 (aged 55); British Hong Kong
- Education: University of Aberdeen
- Occupations: translator, doctor, barrister
- Spouse(s): Alice Walkden (1881–1884); Lily Lai Yuk-hing (1885–1914)
- Children: 1 daughter with Alice Walkden; 10 sons and seven daughters with Lily Lai, including: Ho Wing-ching; Ho Wing hang; Ho Wing-kin; Ho Wing-yuen; Ho Wing-lee; Ho Wing-on; Ho Wing-hong; Ho Wing-kam; Ho Wing-tak; Ho Wing-tse; Ho Sui-kam; Ho Bou-fong (何寶芳)

Kai Ho
- Chinese: 何啟
Transcriptions
Standard Mandarin
- Hanyu Pinyin: Hé Qǐ
Yue: Cantonese
- Jyutping: Ho^{4} Kai^{2}

Ho Shan-kai
- Traditional Chinese: 何神啟
Transcriptions
Standard Mandarin
- Hanyu Pinyin: Hé Shén Qǐ
Yue: Cantonese
- Jyutping: Ho^{4} San^{4} Kai^{2}

Sir Kai Ho CMG JP (Chinese: 何啟; 21 March 1859 – 21 July 1914), better known as Sir Kai Ho Kai and born Ho Shan-kai (何神啟), was a Hong Kong barrister, physician and essayist in colonial Hong Kong. He played a key role in the relationship between the Hong Kong local community and the British colonial government. He is remembered as a supporter of the Reform Movement and as a teacher of Sun Yat-sen, who would become the founding father of the Republic of China. Hong Kong's former airport, Kai Tak Airport, was named after him as the land the airport sat on was reclaimed by Kai Tack Land Investment Company Limited, founded by him and Au Tak.

== Early years ==
Kai Ho was the fourth son of Hoh Fuk-tong of the London Missionary Society, and the brother of Ho Miu-ling (wife of Wu Tingfang, Hong Kong's first Chinese barrister and first Chinese member of the Legislative Council, later Chinese consul-general to the US).

In 1872, at the age of 13, Ho was sent to the UK to study at Palmer House school in Margate, Kent. In September 1875, he registered at the University of Aberdeen. In 1879, he received his MBCM and went to St Thomas' Hospital to take up clinical training. He became the first Chinese qualified physician and graduated from Aberdeen University in the same year. He then studied law at Lincoln's Inn and was called to the bar in 1881.

== Career ==
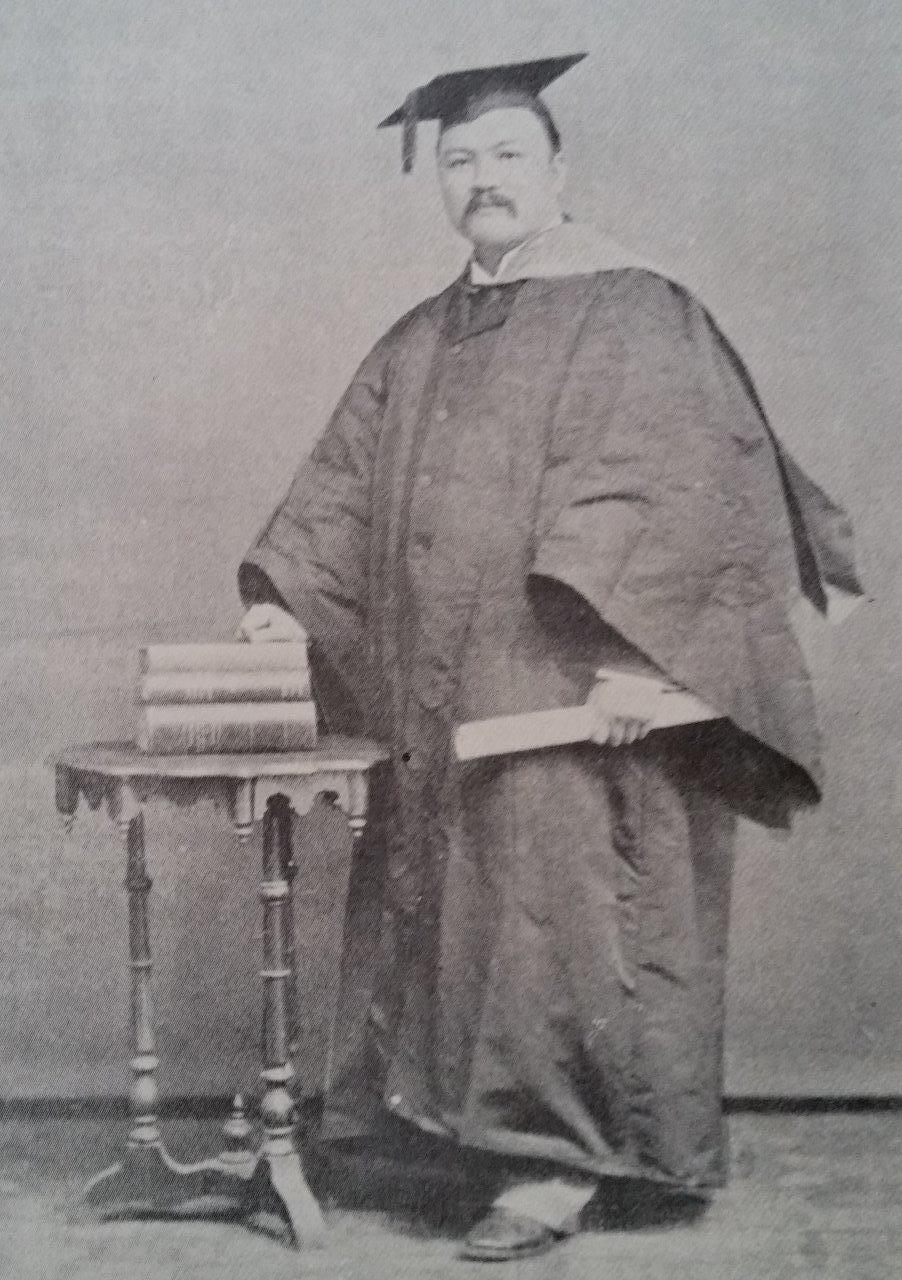
Berobed graduate Ho

Ho returned to Hong Kong in early 1882, and embarked on changing the landscape of Hong Kong's colleges and universities. Chinese culture at that time placed heavy emphasis on traditional Chinese medicine, with Chinese people in the late 19th century being largely sceptical of Western medicine. Ho not only gained the people's acceptance, but also helped the British make possible a number of health-related establishments that otherwise would have been misunderstood by the public.

In 1887, the Hong Kong College of Medicine for Chinese was opened. He made it an initiative that Chinese medicine practitioners too could benefit from an institution that focused on Western medicine. This college later became the basis from which the University of Hong Kong was established in 1910. Throughout Ho's lifetime, he was a vocal supporter of Sun Yat-sen and his revolution to overthrow China's Manchu-led Qing dynasty. A prolific critic of the Self-Strengthening Movement, Ho advocated China to follow the British system in developing a constitutional monarchy.

An example of Ho's support was his defence of the 1884 Praya rioters, which were dubiously charged by the colonial administration with the offence of refusing to accept work. The riots was an event that Sun said cemented his determination to bring about revolution. As a minority and unofficial member of the Legislative Council, he had effected limits to legislation that were discriminatory towards the Chinese. He criticised the proposed Summoning of Chinese Ordinance, Cap. 40 of 1899 as "class legislation" and succeeded, with Wei A Yuk (韋玉), in limiting its effect to finite periods of two years at a time.

Yet, in 1888, in an effort to protect the property interests of the Chinese elite of which he was a leading member, he stiffly opposed the passing of the Public Health Ordinance, which would've proved a vital step in the development of Hong Kong's public hygiene.

Ho was made a Companion of the Most Distinguished Order of Saint Michael and Saint George in 1902 and was knighted in 1912.

In 1912, Ho went into a partnership with his son's father-in-law Au Tak. The project was named Kai Tak Bund, and was a land reclamation development project of houses and recreation grounds, but it later failed and was liquidated in 1924. The land was taken back by the government and later used by a flying school, then a flying club, then as an airfield for the Royal Navy and Royal Air Force, and finally became what would be the world-famous Kai Tak International Airport.

Through his sister Ho Miu-ling, he was the uncle of Wu Chaoshu who served in the Republic China as Minister of Foreign Affairs and Ambassador to the US.

=== Additional roles ===
Ho was a member of the Sanitary Board and a Justice of the Peace. In May 1895, he was temporarily appointed to the governing body of Queen's College.

Ho was also a key player in many aspects of early Hong Kong development, including the 1894 Hong Kong plague, the founding of Alice Memorial Hospital, and the founding of Po Leung Kuk.

== Personal life ==
In probably the first ever Anglo-Chinese marriage, Ho married Alice Walkden (3 February 1852 – 8 June 1884), the eldest daughter of John Walkden of Blackheath. The marriage took place on 13 December 1881 at St Aubyn's Congregational Church in Upper Norwood, London. The couple returned to Hong Kong after Ho's studies, and Walkden gave birth to a daughter. Walkden later died of typhoid fever in Hong Kong in 1884; the daughter was taken to England to be brought up by her relatives. The daughter died young and never married. Alice was English.

Kai Ho later married Lily Lai Yuk-hing (d. 1945). The couple had 17 children.

Alice Ho Miu Ling Nethersole Hospital is named for his wife Alice and his sister Ho Miu-ling.

== Death ==
Ho died in 1914 and was buried at Hong Kong Happy Valley Cemetery near his first wife Alice. Due to the failure of his various business projects and ill health, he died heavily in debt without a will, leaving his family destitute.

Legislative Council of Hong Kong
Preceded by Wong Shing	Chinese Unofficial Member; 1890–1914	Succeeded by Lau Chu Pak
Preceded by Wong Shing	Senior Chinese Unofficial Member; 1890–1914	Succeeded by Wei Yuk
Preceded by Paul Chater	Senior Unofficial Member; 1906–1914	Succeeded by Wei Yuk
