= Jesse William Curtis Jr. =

American judge

Senior Judge of the United States District Court for the Central District of California
- In office December 31, 1975 – February 5, 1990

Judge of the United States District Court for the Central District of California
- In office September 18, 1966 – December 31, 1975
- Appointed by: operation of law
- Preceded by: Seat established by 80 Stat. 75
- Succeeded by: Laughlin Edward Waters Sr.

Judge of the United States District Court for the Southern District of California
- In office August 27, 1962 – September 18, 1966
- Appointed by: John F. Kennedy
- Preceded by: Seat established by 75 Stat. 80
- Succeeded by: Seat abolished

Personal details
- Born: Jesse William Curtis Jr. December 26, 1905 San Bernardino, California
- Died: August 5, 2008 (aged 102) Irvine, California
- Education: University of Redlands (B.A.); Harvard Law School (J.D.)

Jesse William Curtis Jr. (December 26, 1905 – August 5, 2008) was a United States district judge of the United States District Court for the Southern District of California and the United States District Court for the Central District of California.

== Education and career ==
Born in San Bernardino, California, Curtis received a Bachelor of Arts degree from the University of Redlands in 1928 and a Juris Doctor from Harvard Law School in 1932. He was in private practice in San Bernardino from 1932 to 1953, including after 1946 with his father, Jesse W. Curtis Sr., who was an associate justice of the California Supreme Court. Curtis was a Judge of the Superior Court of San Bernardino County from 1953 to 1962.

== Federal judicial service ==
Curtis was nominated by President John F. Kennedy on August 3, 1962, to the United States District Court for the Southern District of California, to a new seat authorized by 75 Stat. 80. He was confirmed by the United States Senate on August 25, 1962, and received his commission on August 27, 1962. He was reassigned by operation of law to the United States District Court for the Central District of California on September 18, 1966, to a new seat authorized by 80 Stat. 75. He assumed senior status on December 31, 1975. His service terminated on February 5, 1990, due to his retirement. Curtis died on August 5, 2008, in Irvine, California.

=== Notable case ===
Curtis was the judge in Madrigal v. Quilligan, involving the sterilization of Latina women in Los Angeles. No más bebés is a documentary film made about this case.

== Sources ==
Legal offices
Preceded by Seat established by 75 Stat. 80	Judge of the United States District Court for the Southern District of California; 1962–1966	Succeeded by Seat abolished
Preceded by Seat established by 80 Stat. 75	Judge of the United States District Court for the Central District of California; 1966–1975	Succeeded by Laughlin Edward Waters Sr.
