= Alice Ho Miu Ling Nethersole Hospital =

- Hospital Authority and Alice Ho Miu Ling Nethersole Charity Foundation

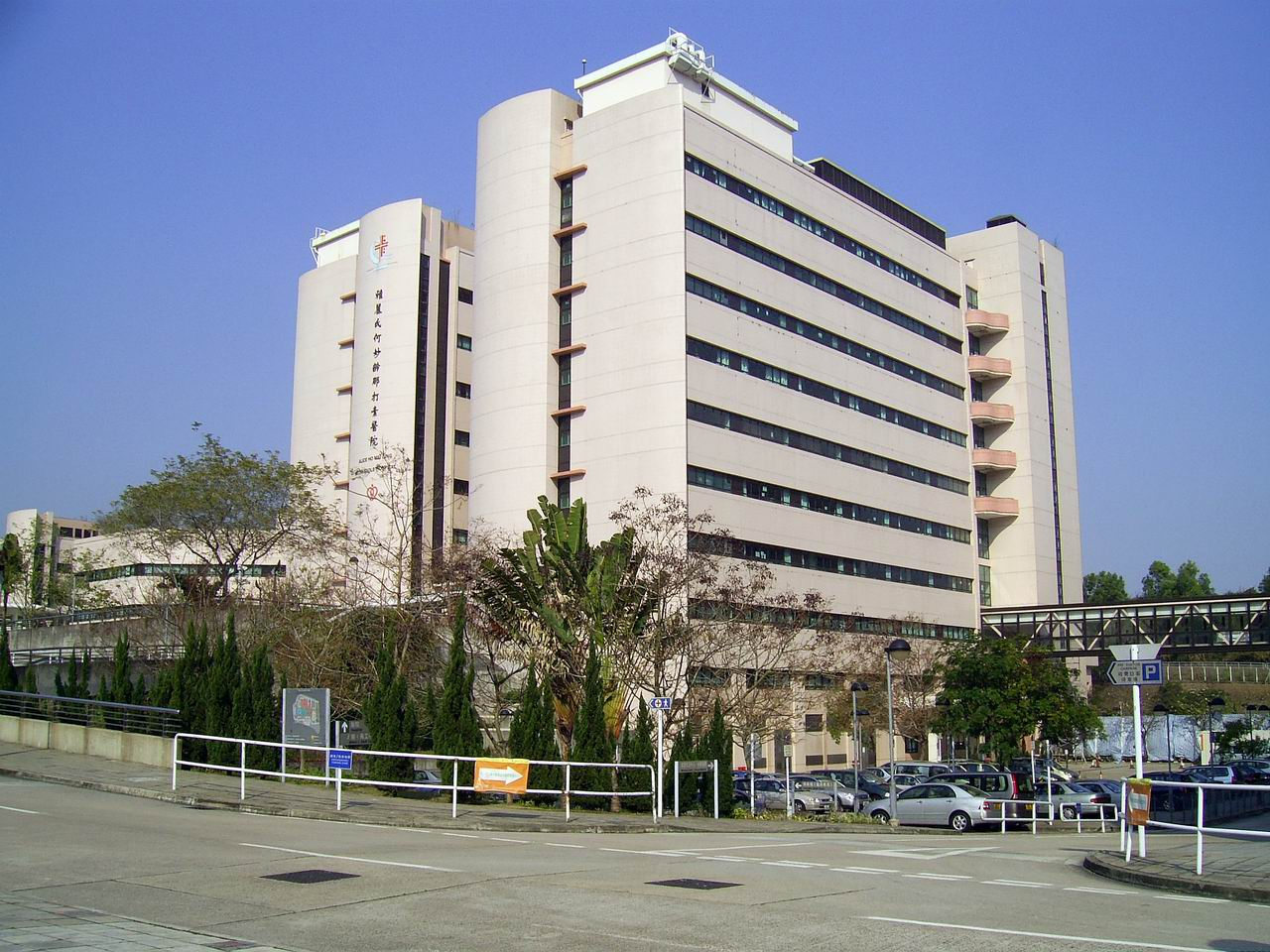
- Alice Ho Miu Ling Nethersole Hospital

- Location within Hong Kong

Geography
- Location: 11 Chuen On Road, Tai Po, New Territories, Hong Kong
- Coordinates: 22.45937°N 114.17421°E

Organisation
- Care system: Public
- Type: District General, Teaching
- Religious affiliation: Christian
- Affiliated university: Faculty of Medicine of the Chinese University of Hong Kong
- Network: New Territories East Cluster

Services
- Emergency department: Yes, 24-hour Accident and Emergency
- Beds: 605

History
- Founded: 16 February 1887; 139 years ago

Links
- Website: www3.ha.org.hk/ahnh/index_e.asp
- Lists: Hospitals in Hong Kong

Alice Ho Miu Ling Nethersole Hospital
- Traditional Chinese: 雅麗氏何妙齡那打素醫院
- Simplified Chinese: 雅丽氏何妙龄那打素医院
Transcriptions
Standard Mandarin
- Hanyu Pinyin: Yǎlìshì Hé Miàolíng Nādásù Yīyuàn
Yue: Cantonese
- Yale Romanization: Ngáhlaihsih Hòhmiuhlìhng Nàhdásou Yīyún
- Jyutping: ngaa5 lai6 si6 ho4 miu6 ling4 naa5 daa2 sou3 ji1 jyun6*2

Alice Ho Miu Ling Nethersole Hospital (Chinese: 雅麗氏何妙齡那打素醫院; AHNH or AHN) is an acute district general hospital managed under the New Territories East Cluster of the Hospital Authority in Hong Kong. Established by the former London Missionary Society in 1887, it was the first teaching hospital in Hong Kong to train Cantonese locals in Western medical science. It moved to its current location in Tai Po in 1997.

== History ==
Early in 1881, a Medical Mission Committee, mostly made up of members of the former London Missionary Society, was established to promote Western medicine in Hong Kong. Henry William Davis, chairman of the committee, donated substantially to set up a dispensary in the Tai Ping Shan district at the western end of Hong Kong Island. The dispensary was named after Davis's mother as the Nethersole Dispensary.

Alice Memorial Hospital (Chinese: 雅麗氏利濟醫院; Cantonese Yale: Ngáhlaihsih Leihjai Yīyún) was opened at 77–81 Hollywood Road on 16 February 1887 under the management of the London Missionary Society. It was the first hospital in Hong Kong to train local Chinese in Western medical science. The hospital structure was built by a donation from Ho Kai in memory of his wife Alice Walkden. She died of typhoid fever in 1884, two years after her arrival in Hong Kong. In 1889, John C Thomson, a medical missionary, was appointed the hospital's first superintendent.

Due to the shortage of beds at the Alice Memorial Hospital, and at the initiation of Davis, the London Missionary Society established a new hospital at 10 Bonham Road. Opened on 5 September 1893, the hospital was called Nethersole Hospital (Chinese: 那打素醫院; Cantonese Yale: Nàhdásou Yīyún). It was the first hospital in Hong Kong to train nurses.

As need for maternity beds became clear, a group of prominent Chinese people, including Ho Kai and Chau Siu-ki, raised funds for building a new hospital. The hospital was opened on 7 July 1904 at 6A Bonham Road and named Alice Memorial Maternity Hospital (Chinese: 雅麗氏紀念產科醫院; Cantonese Yale: Ngáhlaihsih Géinihm Cháanfō Yīyún). It was the first maternity hospital in Hong Kong, and provided midwifery training. It was later merged into Nethersole Hospital.

Shortly after the opening of Alice Memorial Maternity Hospital, a proposal to build another new hospital was raised. Ho Miu-ling, elder sister of Dr Ho Kai and wife of Ng Choy (Wu Ting-fang), agreed to pay the cost of building this hospital. Located at Breezy Path, this new Ho Miu Kwai Hospital, later called Ho Miu Ling Hospital (Chinese: 何妙齡醫院; Cantonese Yale: Hòhmiuhlìhng Yīyún), was opened in 1906. It was a two-storey building with twelve beds, six private rooms and one isolation room. The hospital was also managed by the London Missionary Society.

In 1954, the three hospitals were then amalgamated into the Alice Ho Miu Ling Nethersole Hospital and operated at Breezy Path. The management board of the hospitals was changed from a missionary board to an independent body, the Executive Committee of The Alice Ho Miu Ling Nethersole Hospital.

In 1991, the hospital joined the Hospital Authority to become a public hospital.

In 1993, the Alice Ho Miu Ling Nethersole Hospital moved from Breezy Path to open the new hospital in Chai Wan, which has been known as the Pamela Youde Nethersole Eastern Hospital, under the management of the Hospital Authority.

In 1997, the Alice Ho Miu Ling Nethersole Hospital began to operate at Chuen On Road, Tai Po, New Territories in the completely new hospital premises under the Hospital Authority.

== Service ==
In-patient Services

- Child & Adolescent Psychiatry
- Emergency Medicine Ward
- Ear, Nose & Throat (ENT)
- Ophthalmology (Eye)
- Intensive Care Unit (ICU)
- Medicine
- Orthopaedics & Traumatology
- Paediatrics & Adolescent Medicine

Day Hospital Service

- Geriatric cum Orthopaedics

Specialist Out-Patient Clinics, Day Surgery and Day Procedure Services

- Anaesthesiology
- Child & Adolescent Mental Health Centre
- Comprehensive Day Rehabilitation Centre
- Combined Endoscopy Unit
- Ear, Nose & Throat (ENT)
- Electro-Medical Diagnostic Unit
- Ophthalmology (Eye)
- Gynaecology
- Integrated ENT Centre
- Medicine
- Medical Centre
- Medical Day Integrated Service Centre
- Mental Health Centre (Rehab Unit)
- Motion Study (Gait) Laboratory
- Oral and Maxillofacial Surgery
- Orthopaedics & Traumatology
- Paediatrics & Adolescent Medicine
- Pain Management Centre
- Renal
- Surgery
- Urology

Community Outreach Services

- Community Nursing Service and Community Geriatric Ambulatory Services

Allied Health Services

- Audiology
- Chaplaincy
- Clinical Pathology
- Clinical Psychology
- Diagnostic Radiology
- Dietetics
- Medical Social Work
- Optometry
- Orthoptics
- Occupational Therapy
- Pharmacy
- Physiotherapy
- Prosthetics and Orthotics
- Speech Therapy
- Podiatry

== Logo ==
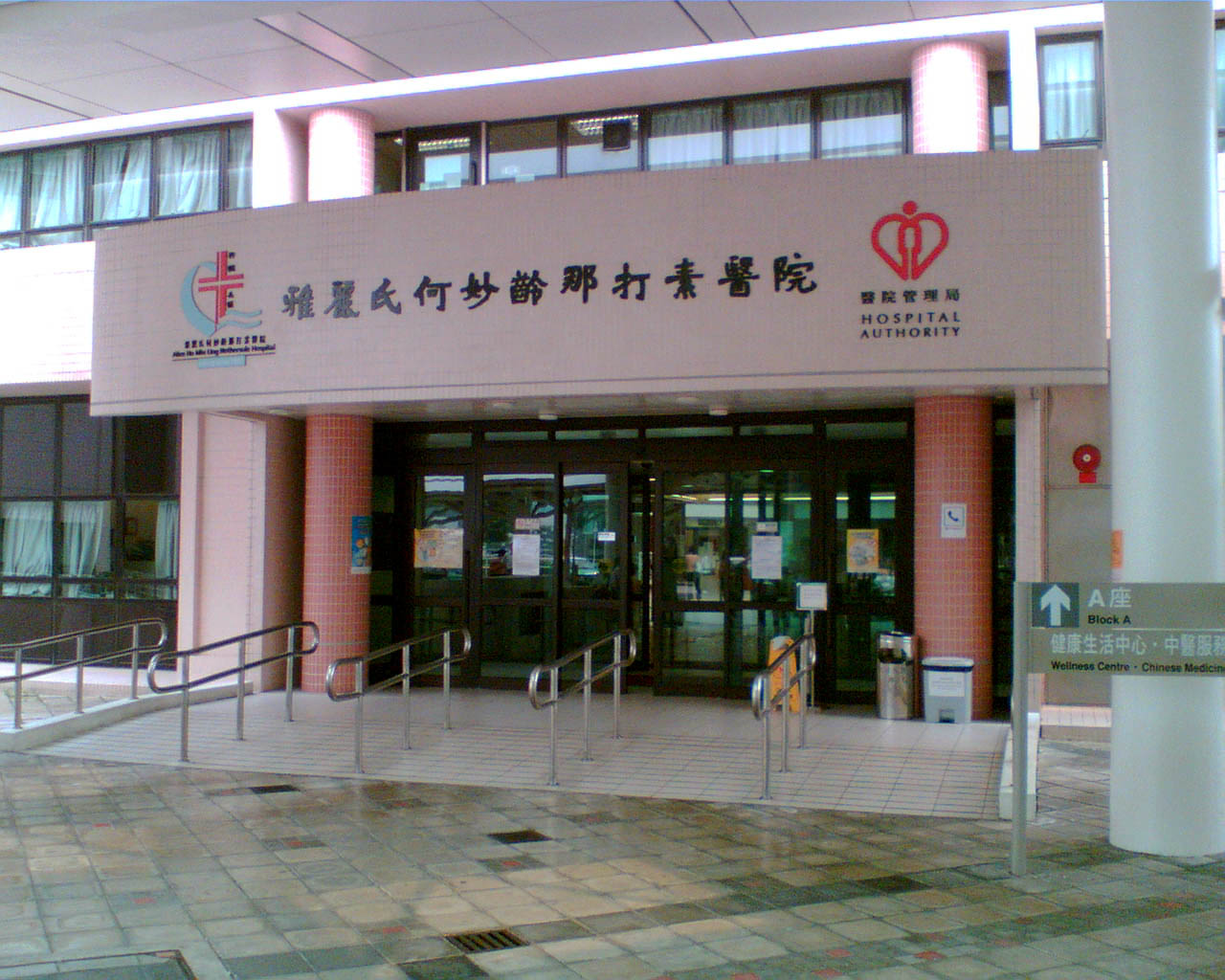
Alice Ho Miu Ling Nethersole Hospital main entrance, showing the hospital name with the hospital logo on the left and the Hospital Authority's logo on the right

The hospital's corporate logo consists of a cross, a heart, and a fountain, representing the spirit of the cross and Christ's love demonstrated to the needy through the care for the physical, psychosocial and spiritual well-being, thus practising the philosophy of holistic healthcare.

== Other ==
In the Hong Kong Museum of Medical Sciences, there is a gallery, named as Alice Ho Miu Ling Nethersole Gallery, displaying the historic items from the hospital.

== See also ==
- Pamela Youde Nethersole Eastern Hospital
- Seaman's Hospital
- Tung Wah Hospital
