= Sylvia Wu =

Chinese-American restaurateur and cookbook author (1915–2022)

- Born: Cheng Ching-yü (鄭鏡宇); October 24, 1915; Jiujiang, China
- Died: September 29, 2022 (aged 106)
- Education: Teachers College, Columbia University
- Occupation(s): Restaurateur, philanthropist, cookbook writer
- Spouse: King Yan Wu (d. 2011)
- Children: 3; including George H. Wu

Sylvia Wu
- Traditional Chinese: 伍鄭鏡宇
- Simplified Chinese: 伍郑镜宇
Transcriptions
Standard Mandarin
- Hanyu Pinyin: Wǔ Zhèng Jìngyǔ
- Bopomofo: ㄨˇ ㄓㄥˋ ㄐㄧㄥˋㄩˇ
- Gwoyeu Romatzyh: Wuu Jenq Jinqyeu
- Wade–Giles: Wu^{3} Cheng^{4} Ching^{4}-yü^{3}
- IPA: [ù ʈʂə̂ŋ tɕîŋ.ỳ]

Sylvia Wu (née Cheng; Chinese: 伍鄭鏡宇; October 24, 1915 – September 29, 2022) was a Chinese-American restaurateur, philanthropist, and cookbook writer. She ran Madame Wu's Garden on Wilshire Boulevard in Los Angeles from 1959 to 1998. She later briefly opened Madame Wu's Asian Bistro & Sushi. She wrote Madame Wu's Art of Chinese Cooking in 1973.

== Personal life ==
Wu was born October 24, 1915, in Jiujiang, Jiangxi, China. Her parents died when she was young and she was raised by her paternal grandfather, a well-to-do man who owned a department store and a bank. They later moved to Shanghai and then Hong Kong. In Hong Kong she helped to raise funds for the relief of Chinese people in Japanese-occupied China. In the process she met King Yan Wu (伍競仁 Wǔ Jìngrén), whose grandfather and father were high officials in the Republic of China.

In 1944, she immigrated by herself to New York City, although she had no friends or family there. She enrolled in Teachers College at Columbia University. At Columbia, she again encountered King Yan Wu, who by then had earned a graduate engineering degree at the Massachusetts Institute of Technology. They married and had three children, including lawyer Patrick Wu and judge George H. Wu. Their daughter Loretta Wu died of cancer in 1979. Her husband died in 2011 after 67 years of marriage. She died at age 106 on September 29, 2022.

== Restaurant career ==
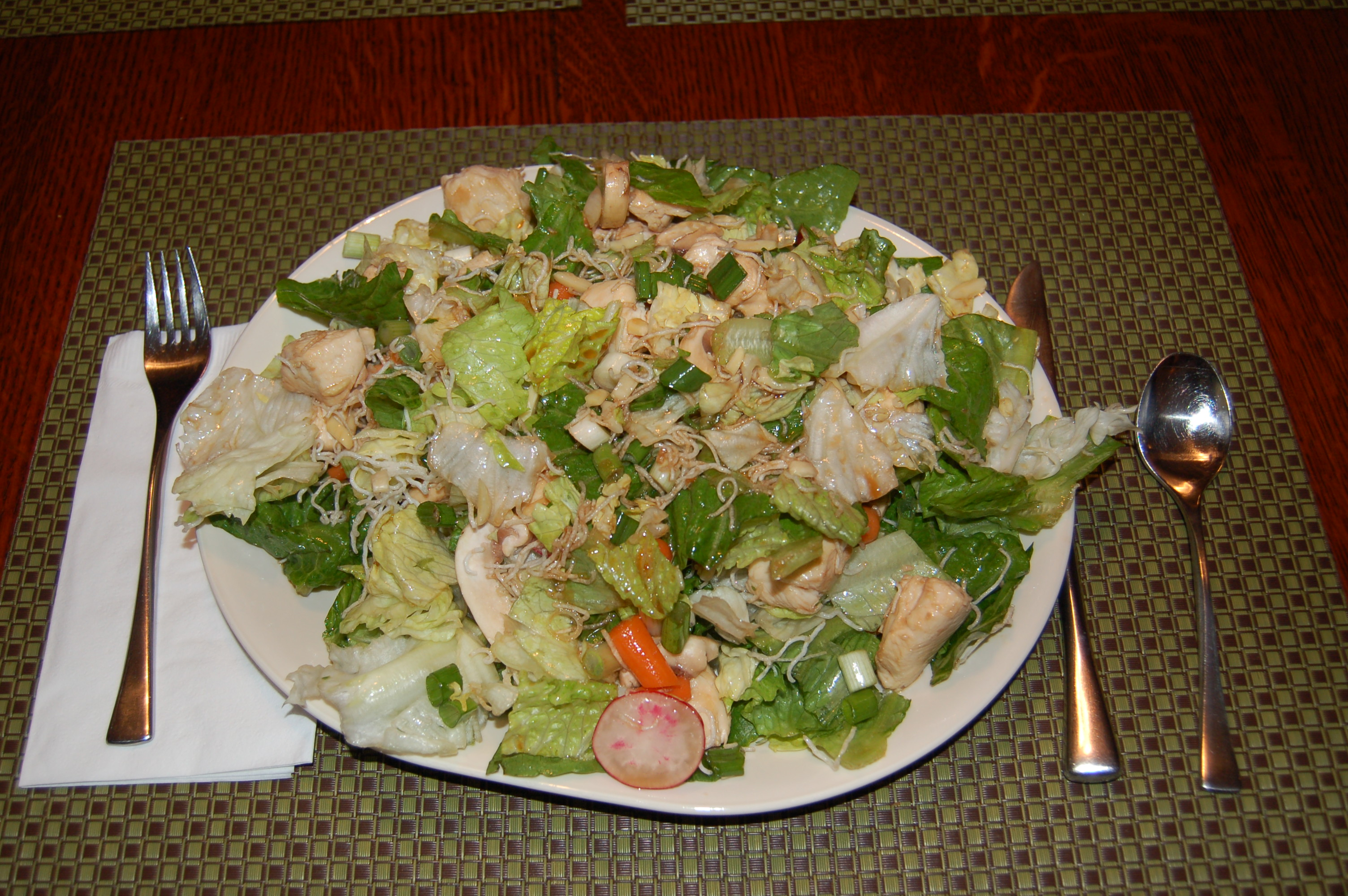
Chinese (or Shredded) Chicken Salad

Wu opened Madame Wu's Garden in 1959, when she was 44 with her children away at boarding school. The restaurant was on Wilshire Boulevard in Santa Monica, California. Her goal was to serve authentic Chinese food instead of the Americanized, chop suey–style dishes which were then served in most Chinese restaurants. The restaurant was small, seating only 50 people. But it was an instant hit and became popular with many Hollywood celebrities. Frequent guests included Mae West, Gregory Peck, Paul Newman, Frank Sinatra, Jane Fonda, and Princess Grace of Monaco, whose favorite was Peking duck. Cary Grant taught Wu how to make shredded chicken salad, and she added it to the menu. She said that the salad had been suggested by Grant but the final recipe was based on a dish that she remembered eating in Shanghai.

In 1968, she moved to a larger space which could seat 300 guests. It featured a koi pond and a waterfall. The pagoda-styled building included four dining rooms, a VIP room, and a crimson rotunda with a garden, including a tall pine tree jutting through the roof. She welcomed guests at the entrance, elegantly clad in floor-length silk dresses.

Wu wrote a cookbook, Madame Wu's Art of Chinese Cooking, in 1973. In 1985, she was named Los Angeles Restaurateur of the Year—the first woman in 70 years to receive that honor—and in 1990 she was named Woman of the Year by the City of Hope cancer hospital in honor of her philanthropy. After closing Madame Wu's Garden in 1998, she opened the short-lived Madame Wu's Asian Bistro & Sushi. In 2001 she published Madame Wu's Garden: A Pictorial History of a Celebrated Landmark.
