= Chinese chicken salad =

American chicken salad with Chinese inspired ingredients

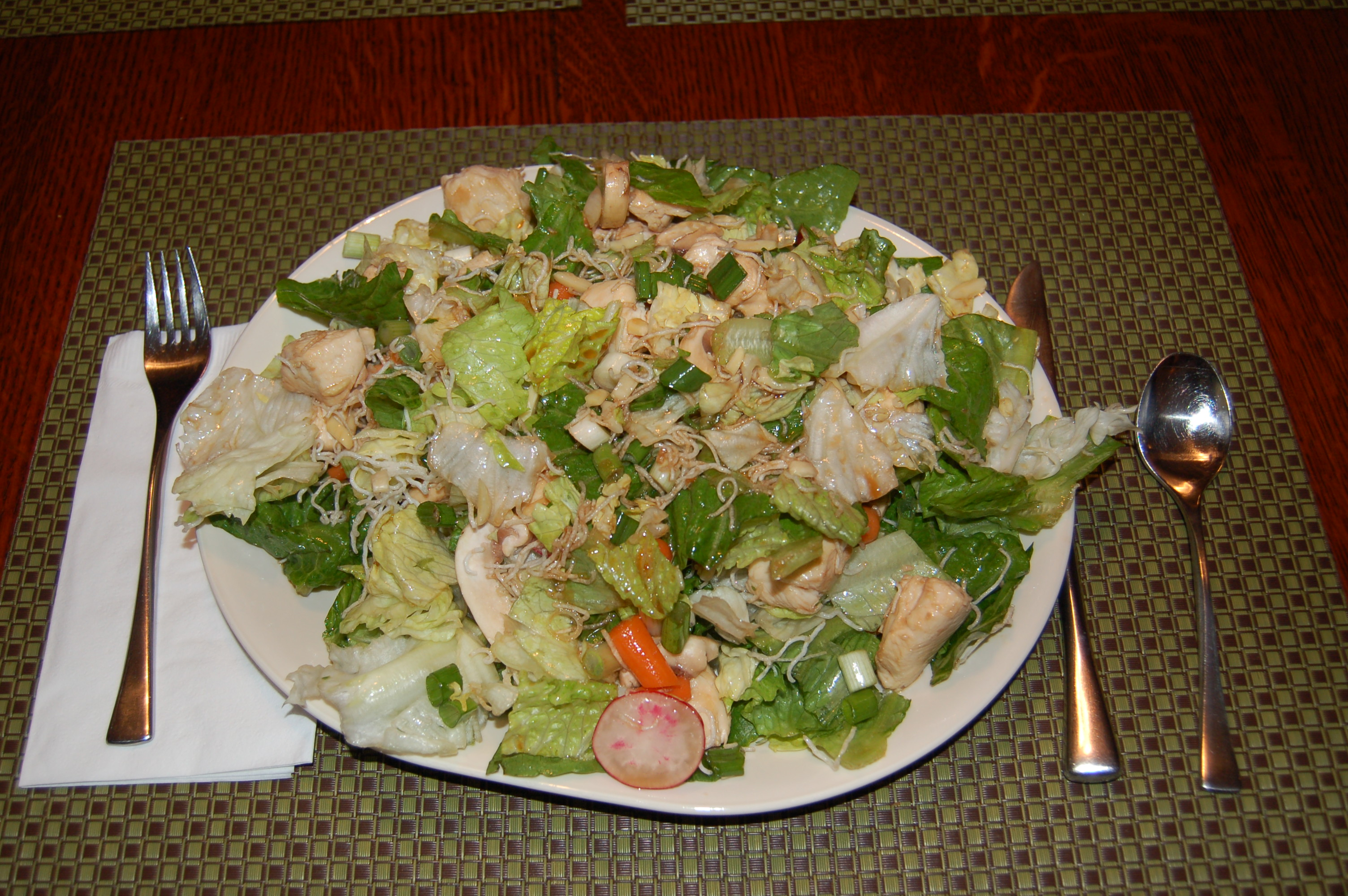
- Type: Salad
- Place of origin: United States
- Main ingredients: Chicken, Chinese noodles, lettuce, ginger, sesame oil

Chinese chicken salad is a salad including chopped chicken and Chinese culinary ingredients that is common in parts of the United States. Though many variations exist, common features of Chinese chicken salads include lettuce, cabbage, carrots, cucumbers (pickled and/or regular), chicken (typically breast meat), deep-fried wonton skins or rice vermicelli and nuts (sliced almonds, cashews or peanuts). A basic vinaigrette for the salad includes ingredients like vegetable oil, sesame oil, rice vinegar (or citrus juice). Optional seasonings include dry hot mustard, sesame seeds, coriander and raw ginger or pickled ginger. In restaurants, Chinese chicken salad may be more embellished and offered as an American-style entree salad, similar to Caesar, Chef, and Cobb salads.

== History ==
The Chinese chicken salad that is popular in the US seems to be a product of pan-Asian cuisine or fusion cuisine influences, rather than having roots in Chinese cuisine. Reasoning for that theory is that green lettuce salad is a dish of primarily Western origins.

Many non-Western world cultures also have salads of various sorts as part of their traditional cuisines. In Fashionable Food: Seven Decades of Food Fads, Sylvia Lovegren writes, "There are many different types of cold chicken salad in China, although most of them seem to originate in Szechwan. But the Chinese chicken salad being consumed ... by the fashionable set, probably originated in California." In Hollywood Dish, Akasha Richmond writes, "Hollywood gave rise to more salads than just the Caesar and Cobb. The 1960s produced the Chinese (or Shredded) Chicken Salad, which was popular at Madame Wu's in Santa Monica. Cary Grant told her about the dish." According to a website about Sylvia Wu, who is popularly known by her alias Madame Wu, "She came up with something better, using a recipe she vaguely remembered having encountered in Shanghai. It was a blend of shredded chicken, fried vermicelli, green onions and toasted almonds. Madame Wu’s soon became known for her Chinese chicken salad, now an American luncheon classic."

In the United States, many common cookbooks from circa 1900 to the 1950s would include chicken salad; but, for many of them, that would often presume a bound salad with chopped vegetables and mayonnaise, typically without lettuce. For example, The Settlement Cookbook by Mrs. Simon Kander, published as early as 1910, includes a simple "Lettuce salad" with chopped onion and French or German dressing; but, no Chinese, Asian or Oriental salad of any kind. Similar bound chicken salads are found in the 1974 edition of Joy of Cooking (first published 1931). It was by 1950s that main course type salads started to appear in books like Better Homes & Gardens, New Cook Book; whereas, that often included Caesar salad along with the usual bound chicken salad, but no Asian-styled or -flavored salads. The Good Housekeeping Cookbook introduced a "Sesame-Spinach Salad," with soy sauce and salad oil, although not with sesame oil; whereas, this introduced something closer to Asian flavors, such as a few curry salads and others similar to those of Better Homes. The next generation of ever more exotic and main course salads were on the way.

With intimations of Asian-style lettuce salads appearing by the 1950s and into the 1970s, publishers like California's Sunset Magazine stated in their popular cookbooks and guides that "You'll find such classics as Caesar, Waldorf, and Crab Louis; international favorites with exotic names like Tabbuli and Antipasto; satisfying whole-meal salads like Shrimp-stuffed Avocados and Taco Salad..." and so on. Suddenly, sesame seeds went from just being a garnish on a salad, to being an ingredient for a recipe of "Sesame Seed Dressing" (p. 6); but, more over, and indeed, there was now a recipe for "Chinese Chicken Salad" (p. 35).

Sunset's recipe for Chinese Chicken appeared similarly as to what it's known as today, including: soy sauce; salad oil; garlic and ginger; (relatively exotic) Chinese five-spice or (more common substitute, ground cinnamon); broiler fryer chicken (marinated in sherry wine); sesame seed; shredded iceberg lettuce; green onions; coriander (cilantro); cashews or peanuts; and lemon dressing. It was noted therein, that "Many variations of this salad vie for popularity. This one, without traditional crisp noodles, is simpler than most..." since, fried vermicelli noodles is probably difficult to find and make for many homemakers. Most of these recipes had not yet included sesame oil, seemingly still rare to find for most homemakers.

Beyond that, perhaps reflecting the California lifestyle and its eventual approach to the newer California Cuisine that used fresh ingredients and contemporary, multicultural flare, Sunset also now provided countless other Asian salad recipes, seeming to recognize the new trend and desire: Oriental Cabbage Slaw (p. 24); Oriental Wilted Romaine Salad (p. 25); Chicken in Cantaloupe with Curry Dressing (no lettuce) (p. 33); Hoisin Chicken Salad (p. 36); Oriental Turkey Salad (p. 37); and so on. The new Chinese and other Asian salads were added with a broad arrangement of other main salads, although perhaps not authentic, they were nevertheless styled and inspired by exotic cuisines and ingredients. Sunset's salad book and recipes seemed to appeal to Americans's desire for greater variety and international fares.

The continued popularity of Chinese chicken salad has established its regular feature on many restaurant menus, including from the fast food establishment Wendy's "Asian Cashew Chicken Salad" to the upscale "Chinois Chicken Salad" by Wolfgang Puck; of which, this later figure is indeed one of the few pioneers of California Cuisine.

Today's Chinese chicken salad has been developed, but found its contributions from various restaurants, cookbooks and online recipes. As a quick and easy homestyle salad this salad may contain a combination of water chestnuts and mandarin orange slices; as well as use of store-bought instant ramen noodles and a seasoning packet that is used to flavor a vinaigrette dressing. All of these recipes provide variations of the salad's style and theme; all of them representing interpretations from various contributors.

While Chinese chicken salad, and its variations, have also been known as "Asian Chicken Salad" and "Oriental Chicken Salad"; more over, it has as well (sometimes) seen the removal of chicken from the dish and its name (if not adding or substituting other ingredients, like seafood).

== See also ==
- List of salads
