= Ho Miu-ling =

Hong Kong philanthropist

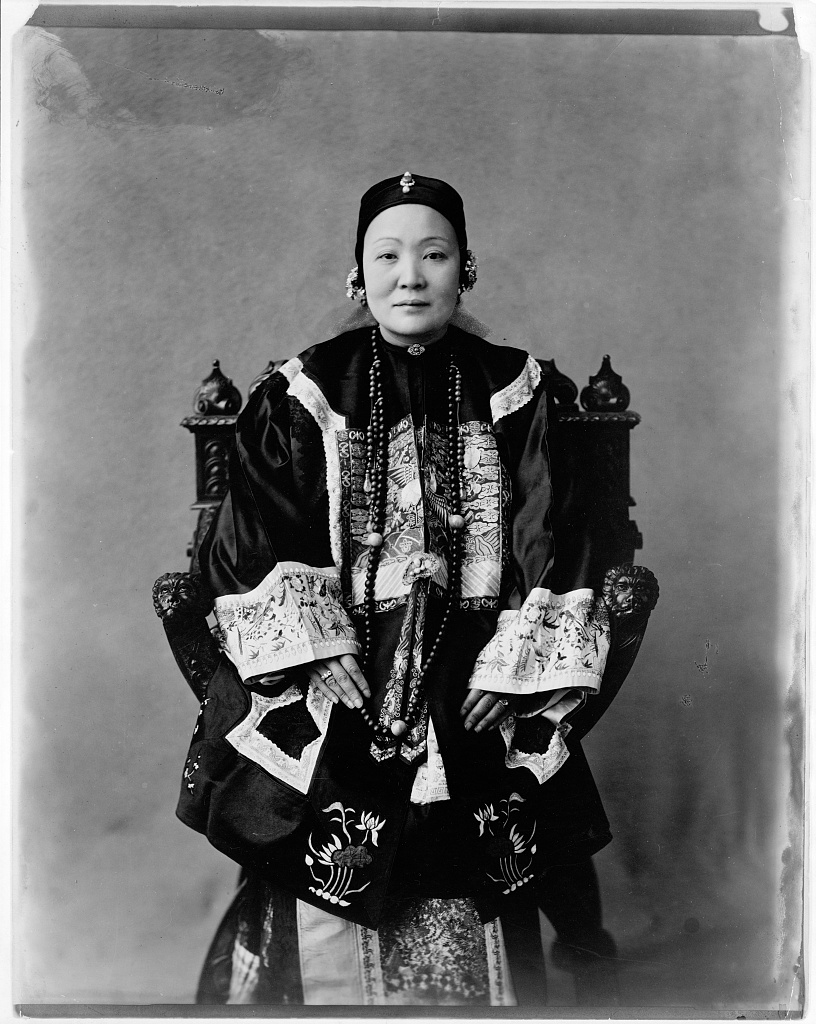
- Mme Wu Tingfang (Ho Miu-ling) in elaborate dress, photographed by Frances Benjamin Johnston, from the George Grantham Bain Collection, Library of Congress.
- Traditional Chinese: 何妙齡
- Simplified Chinese: 何妙龄
Transcriptions
Standard Mandarin
- Hanyu Pinyin: Hé Miàolíng
Yue: Cantonese
- Yale Romanization: Hòhmiuhlìhng
- Jyutping: ho4 miu6 ling4

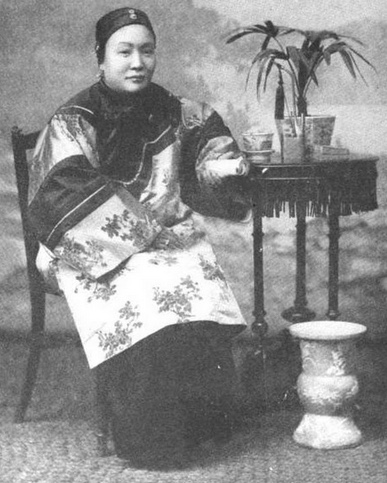
Madame Wu Tingfang (Ho Miu-ling), from a 1908 publication.

Ho Miu-ling (1847–1937) was a philanthropist in British Hong Kong. Her influential family included her brother, barrister Kai Ho, her husband, diplomat Wu Tingfang, and her son, diplomat Wu Chaoshu. The Alice Ho Miu Ling Nethersole Hospital is named for her and for her sister-in-law, Alice Walkden.

== Early life ==
Ho Miu-ling was one of the eleven children of Rev. Hoh Fuk Tong (1818-1871), a Chinese Christian preacher and writer in Hong Kong. Her brother was Sir Ho Kai.

== Diplomacy and philanthropy ==
Ho Miu-ling married at age 17, and supported her husband through his legal studies in London. She traveled with him and performed the duties of an official hostess when he was a Minister of Imperial China from 1896 to 1910, serving in the United States, England, Peru, Mexico, Spain, Cuba, and Japan. He was also a government minister of the Republic of China, from 1910 to 1922. She was reported to have bound feet, but to be against the practice of foot binding as a result of her travels. She also pointed out the health-damaging effects of corsets for Western women: "While I am exceedingly fond of America and enjoy many of its privileges and ways," she explained, "yet I prefer having small feet to a little waist. My vital organs are not affected in any way or injured by the confinement of my feet in childhood, but the health of many an American woman is ruined by the constriction of her waist."

In widowhood Ho Miu-ling returned to Hong Kong, where she was a major donor to charities, including building funds for churches and scholarships. Ho Miu Ling Hospital opened in 1906, funded by Ho Miu-ling and operated under the auspices of the London Missionary Society; it eventually merged with two others to form the Alice Ho Miu Ling Nethersole Hospital.

== Personal life ==
Ho Miu-ling married Wu Tingfang (1842–1922) in 1864. Their son Wu Chaoshu (1887–1934) was born in Tianjin, educated in American schools, and followed his father into a career in diplomacy. She survived both her husband and her son, and died in 1937, aged 91 years.

United States District Court judge George H. Wu is her great-grandson.
