= Au Tak =

Hong Kong entrepreneur (1840–1920)

- 區德
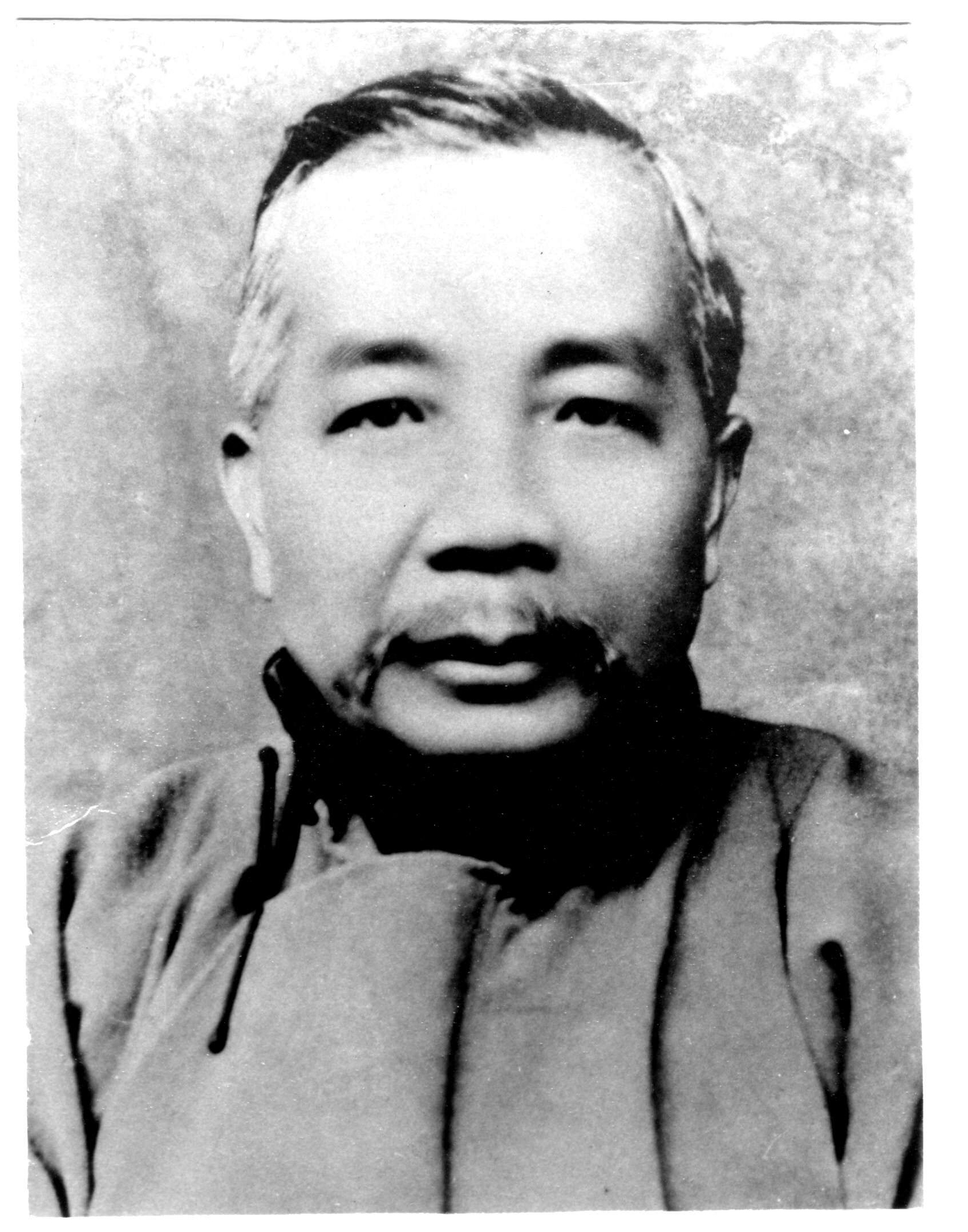
- Born: 1840; Nanhai, Kwangtung (Guangdong), Qing China
- Died: 1920 (aged 79–80); British Hong Kong
- Occupations: Entrepreneur, property developer, educator
- Spouse: Ho Wing-ching

Au Tak
- Traditional Chinese: 區德
- Simplified Chinese: 区德
Transcriptions
Standard Mandarin
- Hanyu Pinyin: Ōu Dé
Yue: Cantonese
- Jyutping: au1 dak1

Au Chak-mun
- Traditional Chinese: 區澤民
- Simplified Chinese: 区泽民
Transcriptions
Standard Mandarin
- Hanyu Pinyin: Ōu Zémín
Yue: Cantonese
- Jyutping: au1 zaak6 man4

Au Tak (also spelled Au Tack; Chinese: 區德; 1840–1920) or Au Chak-mun (區澤民) was a Hong Kong entrepreneur. He was the proprietor of a furniture shop and the property developers in Central District on Hong Kong Island. He used to be the director of Tung Wah Hospital.

In 1912, Au went into partnership with his son-in-law's father Sir Kai Ho to form a company to develop a piece of land formed by land reclamation in Kowloon Bay. It was planned to build a residential garden estate, but the plan failed and the company went into liquidation in 1924, after both Au and Ho had died. In 1925, the land was taken over by the British Hong Kong Government as the use of the airport.

== See also ==
- Munsang College (named after Tak (Au Tak Mun) and Mok Kon Sang)
