= Anne Hwang =

American judge (born 1975)

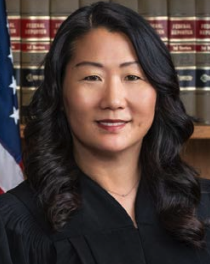

Judge of the United States District Court for the Central District of California
- Incumbent
- Assumed office December 6, 2024
- Appointed by: Joe Biden
- Preceded by: George H. Wu

Judge of the Los Angeles County Superior Court
- In office 2019 – December 6, 2024
- Appointed by: Jerry Brown
- Preceded by: new seat
- Succeeded by: Sumako McCallum

Personal details
- Born: 1975 (age 50–51) Los Angeles, California, U.S.
- Party: Democratic
- Education: Cornell University (BA); University of Southern California (JD)

Anne Hwang (born 1975) is an American lawyer who has served as a United States district judge of the United States District Court for the Central District of California since 2024. She previously served as a judge of the Los Angeles County Superior Court from 2019 to 2024.

== Education ==
Hwang received a Bachelor of Arts from Cornell University in 1997 and a Juris Doctor from the USC Gould School of Law in 2002.

== Career ==
Hwang started her legal career, working as a litigation associate at Irell & Manella LLP in Century City from 2002 to 2006. From 2006 to 2018, she served as a deputy federal public defender in the Office of the Federal Public Defender for the Central District of California. On December 7, 2018, Governor Jerry Brown appointed Hwang to serve as a judge of the Los Angeles County Superior Court.

=== Federal judicial service ===
On April 28, 2024, President Joe Biden announced his intent to nominate Hwang to serve as a United States district judge of the United States District Court for the Central District of California. On April 30, 2024, her nomination was sent to the Senate. President Biden nominated Hwang to the seat vacated by Judge George H. Wu, who assumed senior status on November 3, 2023. On May 22, 2024, a hearing on her nomination was held before the Senate Judiciary Committee. On July 11, 2024, her nomination was reported out of committee by an 11–10 vote. On November 20, 2024, the United States Senate invoked cloture on her nomination by a 51–48 vote. On December 2, 2024, her nomination was confirmed by a 48–43 vote. She received her judicial commission on December 6, 2024.

On June 26, 2026, Hwang declared a mistrial in Jonathan Rinderknecht's federal arson trial related to the January 2025 Palisades fire.

== See also ==
- List of Asian American jurists

Legal offices
Preceded by George H. Wu	Judge of the United States District Court for the Central District of California; 2024–present	Incumbent
