= North District Hospital =

- Hospital Authority
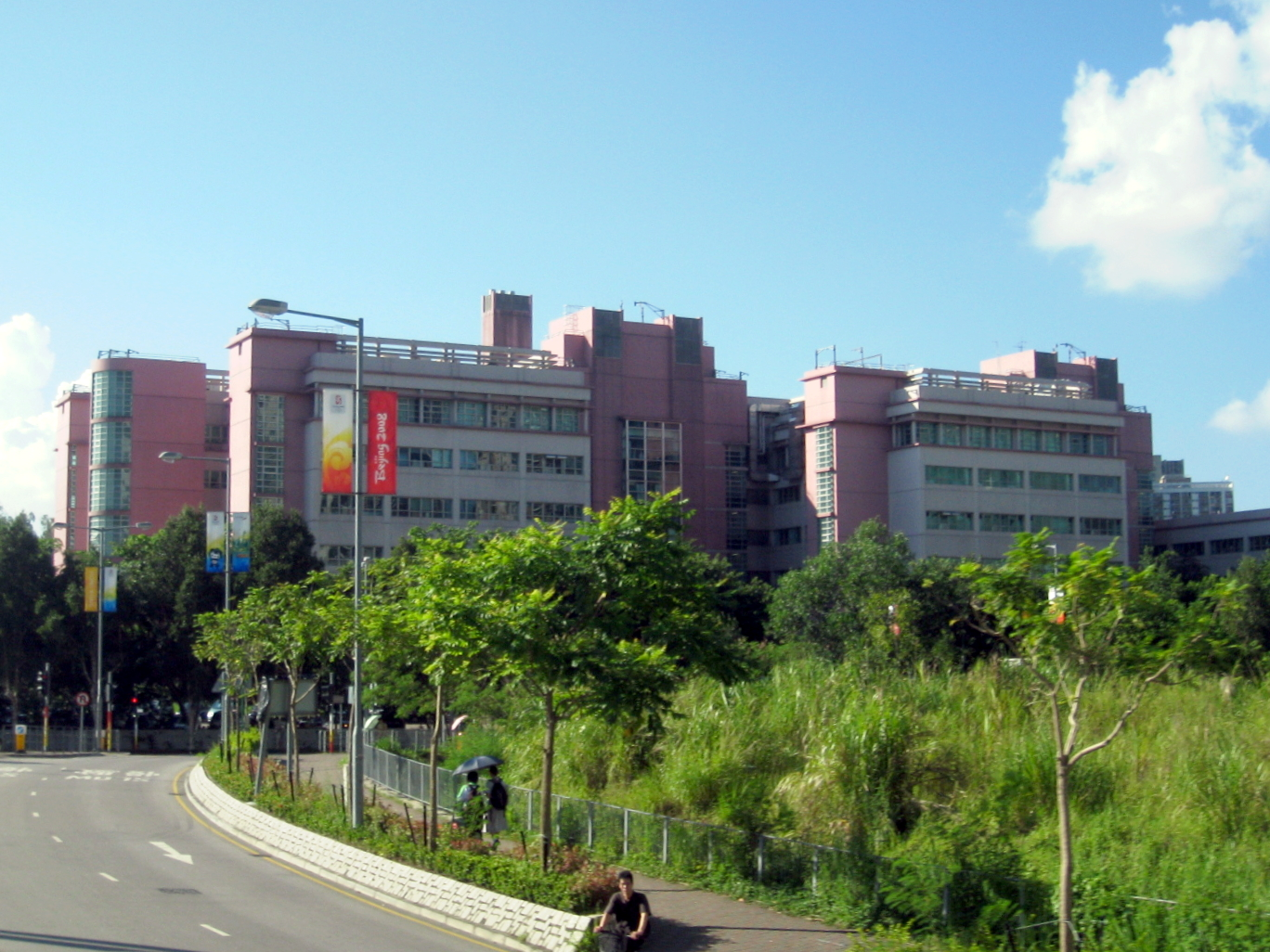

- Location within Hong Kong

Geography
- Location: 9 Po Kin Road, Sheung Shui, Hong Kong
- Coordinates: 22°29′49″N 114°07′28″E

Organisation
- Type: District General
- Network: New Territories East Cluster

Services
- Emergency department: Yes, Accident and Emergency
- Beds: 683

Helipads
- Helipad: No

History
- Founded: 27 February 1998; 28 years ago

Links
- Website: www.ha.org.hk/ndh
- Lists: Hospitals in Hong Kong

North District Hospital (Chinese: 北區醫院; Cantonese Yale: Bākkēui Yīyún; NDH) is a district general hospital serving the population of the New Territories East Cluster. It has now 683 in-patient beds, 24-hour Accident & Emergency service, specialist out-patient, day and community facilities.

NDH is the first hospital completely planned and built by the Hospital Authority since their establishment in 1990. After five years' construction, the hospital commenced service in February 1998. The location was formerly known as the Dodwell's Ridge Camp (Chinese: 天祥營; Cantonese Yale: Tīn chèuhng yìhng) of the Royal Hong Kong Police Cadet School.

== History ==
The decision to build the North District Hospital was the result of a 1992 Hospital Authority review of the provision of hospital beds across the territory, based on figures collected in the 1991 census. The government entrusted the Hospital Authority with the design and construction of the new hospital. It was procured through a design–build contract with builder Hsin Chong.

The hospital first opened on 27 February 1998. The 24-hour accident and emergency department was commissioned in August 1998. An official inauguration ceremony was held by Chief Executive Tung Chee-hwa on 14 November 1998.

== Specialties Services ==
- Accident and Emergency Department
- Department of Anaesthesia
- Department of Clinical Pathology
- Intensive Care Unit (ICU)
- Department of Medicine
- Department of Neurosurgery
- Department of Gynaecology
- Department of Oral-Maxillofacial Surgery & Dental (OMS)
- Department of Orthopaedics & Traumatology
- Department of Paediatrics & Adolescent Medicine (Out-patient services only. Patients may have to be transferred to other hospitals for treatment)
- Department of Psychiatry (Community outreach services and out-patient services only)
- Department of Radiology
- Department of Surgery
