= Laughlin Edward Waters Sr. =

American judge (1914–2002)

Senior Judge of the United States District Court for the Central District of California
- In office July 6, 1986 – June 3, 2002

Judge of the United States District Court for the Central District of California
- In office May 12, 1976 – July 6, 1986
- Appointed by: Gerald Ford
- Preceded by: Jesse William Curtis Jr.
- Succeeded by: Ronald S. W. Lew

United States Attorney for the Central District of California
- In office July 31, 1953 – April 27, 1961
- President: Dwight D. Eisenhower; John F. Kennedy
- Preceded by: Walter Binns
- Succeeded by: Francis C. Whelan

Member of the California State Assembly from the 58th district
- In office January 6, 1947 – July 30, 1953
- Preceded by: Frank J. Waters Jr.
- Succeeded by: Joseph C. Shell

Personal details
- Born: Laughlin Edward Waters; August 16, 1914 Los Angeles, California
- Died: June 3, 2002 (aged 87) Los Angeles, California
- Party: Republican
- Spouse: Voula (m. 1953)
- Children: 5
- Education: University of California, Los Angeles (AB); University of Southern California (JD)

Military service
- Branch/service: United States Army
- Battles/wars: World War II

Laughlin Edward Waters Sr. (August 16, 1914 – June 3, 2002) was a United States district judge of the United States District Court for the Central District of California.

== Education and career ==
Born in Los Angeles, California, Waters received an Artium Baccalaureus degree from the University of California, Los Angeles in 1939 and was in the United States Army Infantry during World War II, from 1942 to 1945, achieving the rank of captain. A statue of him was erected in a French town his troops liberated, and he was mentioned in Stephen Ambrose's Citizen Soldiers. He was a deputy attorney general of the State of California from 1946 to 1947, receiving a Juris Doctor from the USC Gould School of Law in 1947. He was in private practice in Los Angeles from 1947 to 1953. He was a Republican member of the California State Assembly for the 58th district from 1947 to 1953. He was United States Attorney for the Southern District of California from 1953 to 1961, returning to private practice in Los Angeles from 1961 to 1976.

== Federal judicial service ==
On April 26, 1976, Waters was nominated by President Gerald Ford to a seat on the United States District Court for the Central District of California vacated by Judge Jesse William Curtis Jr. Waters was confirmed by the United States Senate on May 11, 1976, and received his commission on May 12, 1976. He assumed senior status on July 6, 1986, serving in that capacity until his death on June 3, 2002, in Los Angeles.

== Sources ==
- Laughlin E. Waters, Oral history interview, conducted 1987 by Carlos Vasquez for California State Archives State Government Oral History Program.

Legal offices
Preceded by Jesse William Curtis Jr.	Judge of the United States District Court for the Central District of California; 1976–1986	Succeeded by Ronald S. W. Lew
