= Ronald S. W. Lew =

American judge (1941–2023)

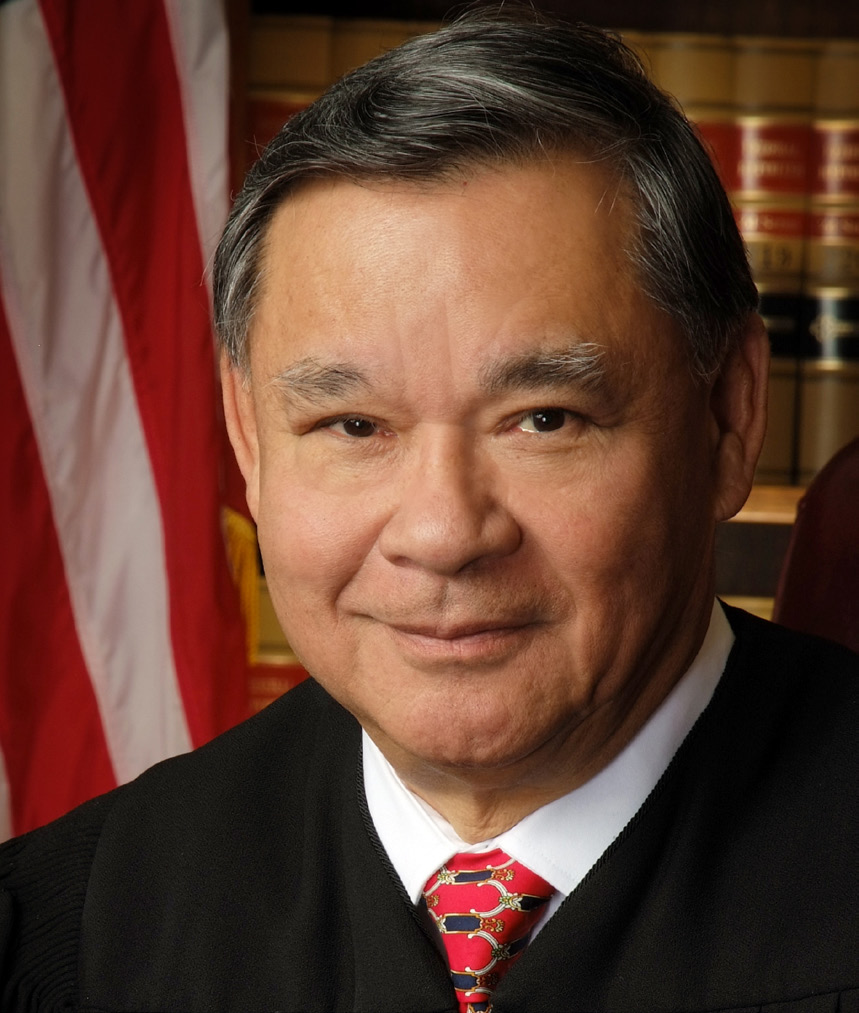

Senior Judge of the United States District Court for the Central District of California
- In office September 19, 2006 – May 19, 2023

Judge of the United States District Court for the Central District of California
- In office May 7, 1987 – September 19, 2006
- Appointed by: Ronald Reagan
- Preceded by: Laughlin Edward Waters Sr.
- Succeeded by: George H. Wu

Judge of the Los Angeles Superior Court
- In office 1984–1987
- Appointed by: George Deukmejian

Judge of the Los Angeles Municipal Court
- In office 1982–1984
- Appointed by: Jerry Brown

Personal details
- Born: Ronald Sing Wai Lew; September 19, 1941 Los Angeles, California, U.S.
- Died: May 19, 2023 (aged 81)
- Spouse: Mamie Wong
- Education: Loyola Marymount University (BA); Southwestern University (JD)

Military service
- Allegiance: United States
- Branch/service: United States Army
- Years of service: 1967–1969
- Rank: First Lieutenant
- Unit: Transportation Corps

Ronald Sing Wai Lew (Chinese name: 刘成威; September 19, 1941 – May 19, 2023) was a United States district judge of the United States District Court for the Central District of California.

== Education and career ==
Born in Los Angeles, Lew graduated from Loyola High School. He received a Bachelor of Arts degree from Loyola Marymount University in 1964. He received a Juris Doctor from Southwestern University School of Law in 1971. He was in the United States Army from 1967 to 1969. He was a deputy city attorney of the Criminal and Civil Liability Divisions of the Los Angeles City Attorney's Office in California from 1972 to 1974. He was in private practice of law in Los Angeles from 1974 to 1981. He was a Los Angeles fire and police pension commissioner from 1976 to 1982. He was a judge on the Los Angeles Municipal Court from 1982 to 1984. He was a judge on the Los Angeles Superior Court from 1984 to 1987.

== Federal judicial service ==
Lew was nominated by President Ronald Reagan on February 2, 1987, to a seat on the United States District Court for the Central District of California vacated by Judge Laughlin E. Waters. He was confirmed by the United States Senate on May 7, 1987, and received commission the same day. He assumed senior status on September 19, 2006. Outside of Hawaii, Lew was the first Chinese-American appointed to the federal bench after being appointed by President Reagan in 1987. His service terminated upon his death on May 19, 2023, at the age of 81.

== Awards and honors ==
In 2001, Lew was awarded the Historymakers Award by the Los Angeles Chinese American Museum in law and justice. He was also honored by the Chinese Historical Society of Southern California (CHSSC) as one of the Chinese American Pioneers in Law in 2005.

== See also ==
- List of Asian American jurists
- List of first minority male lawyers and judges in the United States

== Sources ==
Legal offices
Preceded by Laughlin Edward Waters Sr.	Judge of the United States District Court for the Central District of California; 1987–2006	Succeeded by George H. Wu
