= Wu Chaoshu =

Republic of China diplomat (1887–1934)

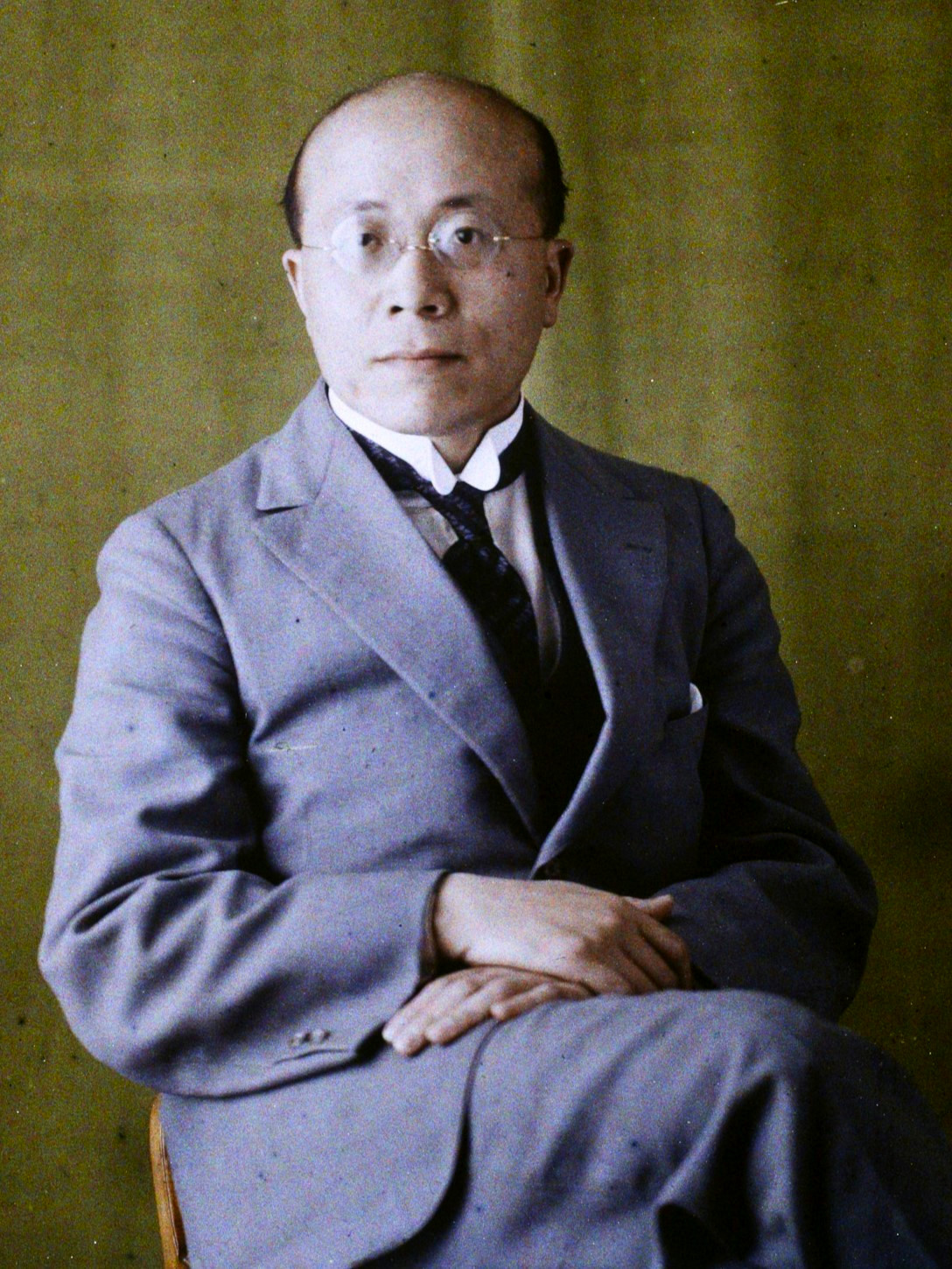
- Autochrome by Georges Chevalier, 1928

Vice-Minister of Foreign Affairs
- In office 1918–1923

Minister of Foreign Affairs
- In office 1923–1924
- Preceded by: None
- Succeeded by: Huang Fu

Minister of Foreign Affairs
- In office 1927–1928
- Preceded by: ?
- Succeeded by: Wang Zhengting

Minister to the United States
- In office 1928–1931
- Preceded by: Alfred Sao-ke Sze
- Succeeded by: Yan Huiqing

Chinese Representative to the League of Nations
- In office 1929–1930
- Preceded by: Alfred Sao-ke Sze
- Succeeded by: Yan Huiqing

Personal details
- Born: 23 May 1887 Tianjin, Qing China
- Died: 3 January 1934 (aged 46) British Hong Kong
- Relations: Sir Ho Kai (uncle)
- Parents: Wu Tingfang (father); Ho Miu-ling (mother)
- Education: University of London

Wu Chaoshu
- Traditional Chinese: 伍朝樞
- Simplified Chinese: 伍朝枢
Transcriptions
Standard Mandarin
- Hanyu Pinyin: Wǔ Cháoshū
- Wade–Giles: Wu^{3} Ch'ao^{2}-shu^{1}
- IPA: [ù ʈʂʰǎʊʂú]
Yue: Cantonese
- Yale Romanization: Ng Chiùhsyū
- IPA: [ŋ tsʰiw˩sy˥]

Wu Chaoshu (traditional Chinese: 伍朝樞; simplified Chinese: 伍朝枢; Wade–Giles: Wu Ch'ao-shu; 23 May 1887 – 3 January 1934), also known as C.C. Wu, was a Chinese diplomat and politician. He was Foreign Minister of the Republic of China in 1927–28, and Minister to the United States from 1928 to 1931.

== Biography ==
Wu was born in Tianjin, the son of former Minister to the United States Wu Tingfang and philanthropist Ho Miu-ling. He attended Atlantic City High School and was valedictorian there in 1904.

He graduated from the University of London in 1911. In 1913, he was elected a member of the Chinese parliament. Four years later, he joined Sun Yatsen's Constitution Protection Movement, and was made Vice-Minister of Foreign Affairs in 1918. He remained in this post until 1923, despite Sun's exile and subsequent return. In 1919, he served as China's chief delegate to the Versailles Peace Conference.

In March 1923, Wu became Foreign Affairs Minister in Sun's government-in-exile. In 1927, he became Foreign Minister of the Republic of China under Chiang Kai-shek. He then served as Minister to the United States from 1928 to 1931, and Representative to the League of Nations in 1929–30. He was the delegate to The Hague Conference for the Modification of International Law in 1930. In 1931, he resigned as Minister to the United States in protest against its supply of arms to the Nanjing government in opposition to the rival Cantonese government.

In 1934, he died of a stroke in British Hong Kong at the age of 46.

Wu married Ho Po Fong, daughter of Ho Kai, and the couple had eight children. One of Wu's grandsons is US federal judge George H. Wu.
