= New Territories East Cluster =

- 新界東醫院聯網
- Logo of the New Territories East Cluster
- Formation: 1 October 2001
- Region served: Hong Kong
- Services: Healthcare
- Cluster Chief Executive: Dr. Simon Tang Yiu-hang
- Parent organisation: Hospital Authority
- Expenses: ▲HK$12.28 billion (2020)
- Staff: 13,061
- Website: www.ha.org.hk/ntec/

New Territories East Cluster (Chinese: 新界東醫院聯網; NTEC) is one of the six hospital clusters managed by Hospital Authority in Hong Kong. It consists of 7 public hospitals and 10 family medicine clinics (FMC) (formerly known as general outpatient clinics (GOPC) (Note: GOPCs have been officially renamed to FMCs in Oct 2025, see this press release)) to provide public healthcare services for the population of Sha Tin, Tai Po, North District, and part of the Sai Kung District. In mid-2019, the population was 1,320,300. Its cluster chief executive as of June 2026 is Dr. Simon Tang Yu-hang.

== Services ==
New Territories East Cluster operates the following seven hospitals of various capabilities to provide a range of acute, convalescent, rehabilitation, infirmary inpatient, and ambulatory care services to the public in the areas of Sha Tin, Tai Po, North District, and part of the Sai Kung District. In mid-2019, the population of the areas was 1,320,300.

- Alice Ho Miu Ling Nethersole Hospital (AHNH)
- Bradbury Hospice (BBH)
- Cheshire Home, Shatin (SCH)
- North District Hospital (NDH)
- Prince of Wales Hospital (PWH)
- Shatin Hospital (SH)
- Tai Po Hospital (TPH)

As of 31 March 2024, a total of 5,212 beds, including 4,183 for general care (acute and convalescent), 477 for infirmary care, and 552 for the mentally ill, were provided.

== Finance ==
The cluster is primarily funded by the Hong Kong Government subvention allocated by the Hospital Authority. For the year ended 31 March 2020, the cluster received HK$10.69 billion of recurrent government subvention. The total expenditure was HK$12.28 billion.
