= Bradbury Hospice =

Hospice in Sha Tin, Hong Kong

- Hospital Authority
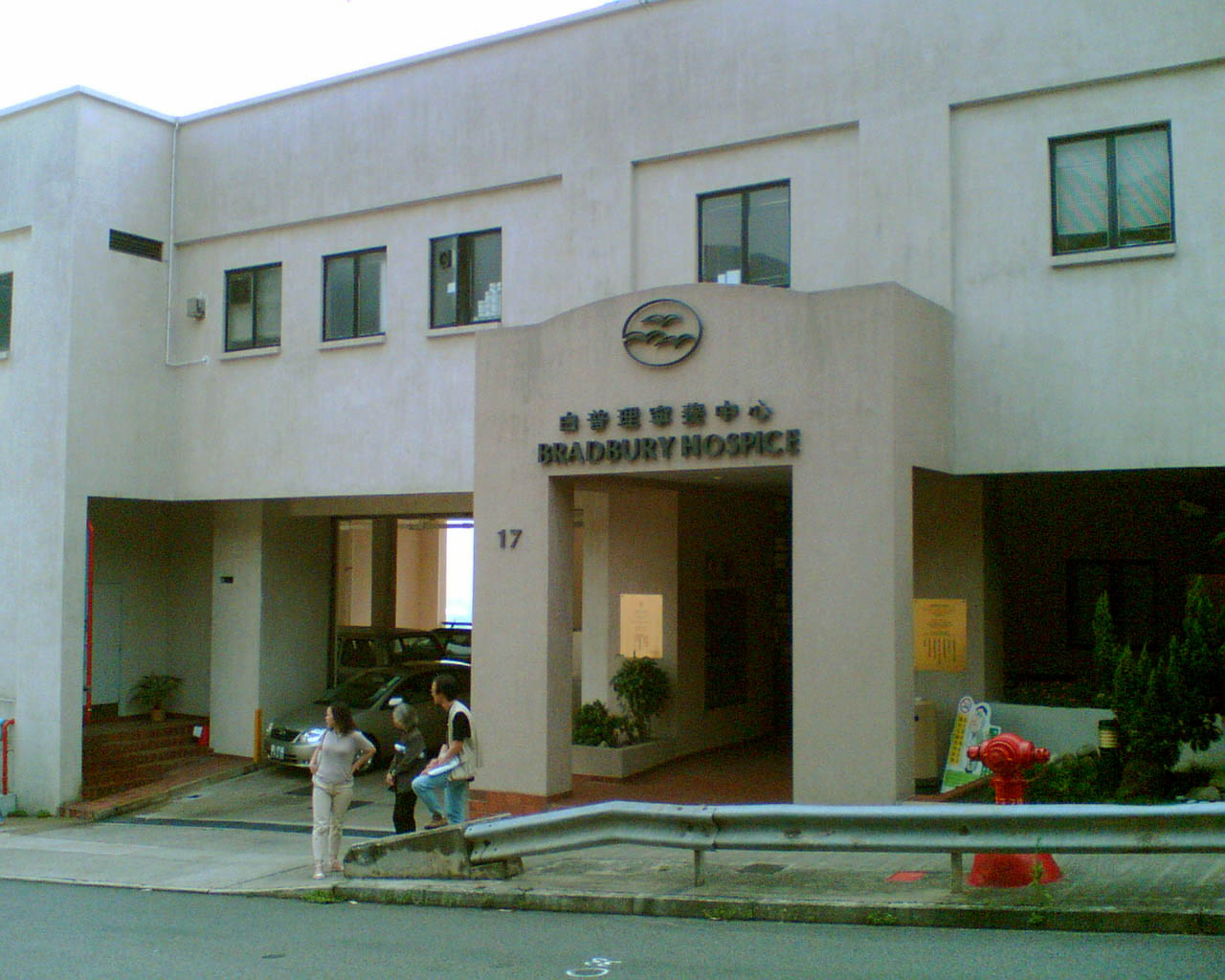

- Location within Hong Kong

Geography
- Location: 17 A Kung Kok Shan Road, Sha Tin, Hong Kong
- Coordinates: 22°23′54″N 114°12′54″E

Organisation
- Type: Specialist
- Network: New Territories East Cluster

Services
- Emergency department: No Accident & Emergency
- Beds: 26
- Speciality: Hospice care

Helipads
- Helipad: No

History
- Founded: 7 November 1992; 33 years ago

Links
- Website: www.ha.org.hk/bbh
- Lists: Hospitals in Hong Kong

Bradbury Hospice (Chinese: 白普理寧養中心; Cantonese Yale: Baahkpóuléih Nìhngyéuhng Jūngsām; BBH) is a hospice with 26 beds located in Sha Tin, Hong Kong. It is under the New Territories East Cluster managed by the Hospital Authority.

== History ==
Bradbury Hospice was found by the Society for the Promotion of Hospice Care and is the first independent hospice in Hong Kong. It was started building in 1990 on land in Sha Tin granted by the Government of Hong Kong, and was named after the Bradbury Charitable Trust, which donated HK$24 million to the building of the hospice. Other principal donors include the Royal Hong Kong Jockey Club and the Keswick Foundation. The 26-bed hospice started its operations in June 1992 and was officially opened on 7 November that year by Charles, Prince of Wales.

On 1 April 1995, the management of the hospice was transferred to the Hospital Authority.

== Services ==
As of April 2024, the hospital had 26 beds and around 69 members of staff.
