= Society for the Promotion of Hospice Care =

Healthcare non-profit organisation based in Hong Kong

- 善寧會
- Abbreviation: SPHC
- Established: 1 July 1986
- Founder: Gabriel O'Mahoney; Vincent Tse; Yu Wing Kwong; Ralph Lee; John Russell
- Type: Non-governmental organization
- Legal status: Charity
- Headquarters: Hong Kong
- Location: 18 A Kung Kok Shan Road, Shatin, New Territories, Hong Kong
- Coordinates: 22°23′55.7″N 114°12′55.6″E
- Region served: Hong Kong
- Services: Hospice and palliative care
- Honorary Presidents: Caroline Courtauld; Edward Leong Che-hung; James E. Thompson; Raymond Wong Siu-Keung; Anthony Wu Ting-yuk
- Chairman: Hubert Chan, JP
- Subsidiaries: Jockey Club Home for Hospice (abbr. JCHH), Jessie & Thomas Tam Bereavement Centre (abbr. JTTC)
- Website: Official website (English version)

The Society for the Promotion of Hospice Care (Chinese: 善寧會) (SPHC) is a non-profit NGO that advocates and provides hospice and palliative care services in Hong Kong. It also conducts end-of-life research, education, and training.

The organisation’s subsidiaries – Jockey Club Home for Hospice (賽馬會善寧之家) and Jesse and Thomas Tam Centre (譚雅士杜佩珍安家舍) – provide palliative patient care and bereavement support respectively.

The current Chairman is Professor Thomas Wong.

== History ==
=== Establishment ===
The need for end-of-life care in Hong Kong was identified in 1984, when Sister Gabriel O’Mahoney, then medical superintendent of Ruttonjee Sanatorium, invited Professor James Hanrathy of St Joseph's Hospice in the United Kingdom to a local hospice care conference sponsored by the Keswick Foundation. In 1986, SPHC was established by Sister Gabriel O’Mahoney, Dr Vincent Tse, Dr Yu Wing Kwong, Reverend Ralph Lee, and Reverend John Russell to advocate hospice care in Hong Kong.

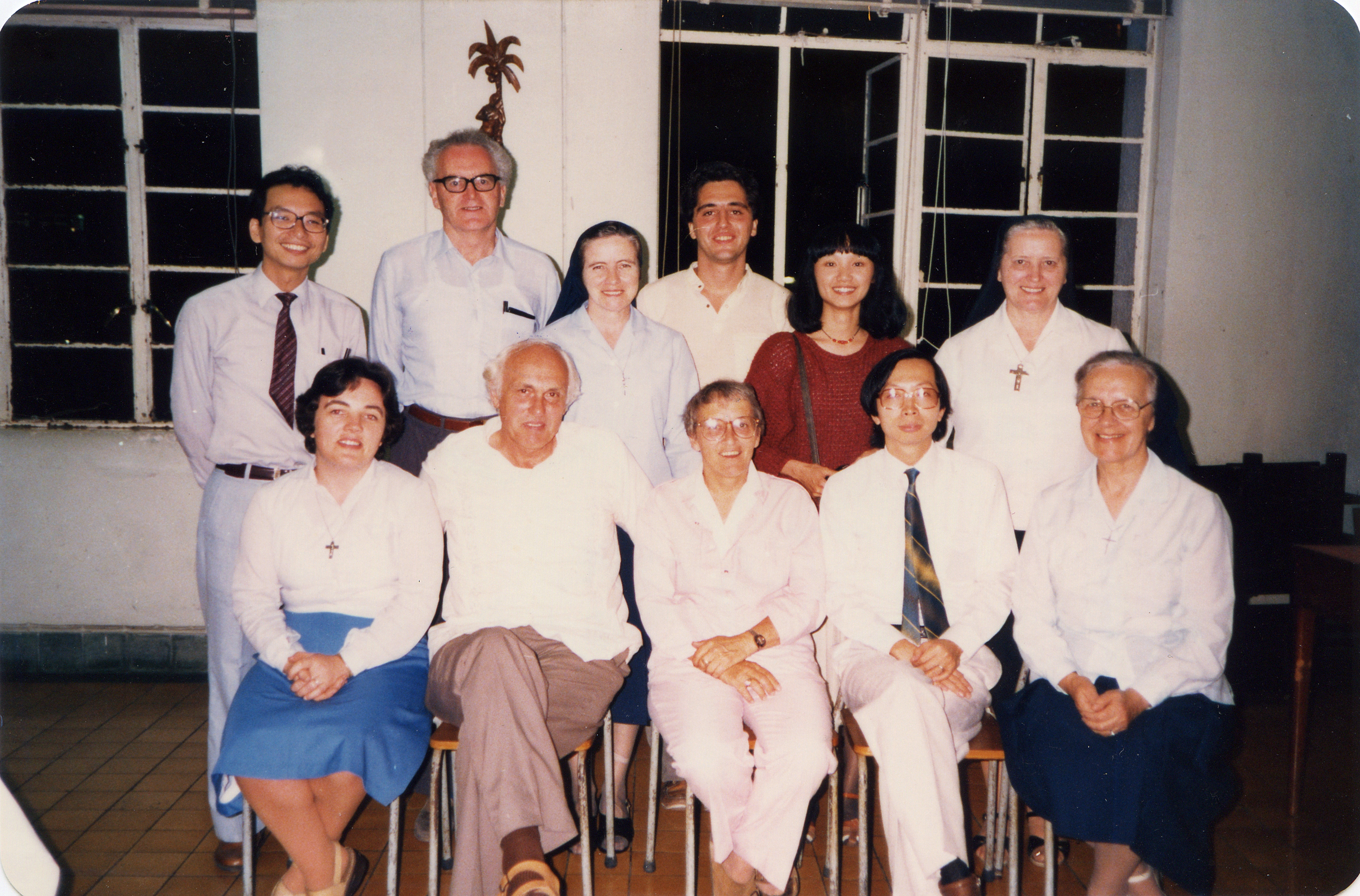
Founding members of SPHC

SPHC originally operated from a 70-square-foot workstation in the old Ruttonjee Sanatorium where a small team of doctors, nurses, social workers, and pastoral care workers - many of whom were part-time staff - ran a hospice care outpatient clinic.

=== Bradbury Hospice ===
In 1992, SPHC opened Bradbury Hospice, Hong Kong’s first independent hospice, in the Shatin neighbourhood. For the first three years of operation, the 26-bed facility was funded entirely through public contributions. In 1995, SPHC transferred the management and control of Bradbury Hospice to the Hospital Authority, signifying the incorporation of hospice care into Hong Kong’s public health system.

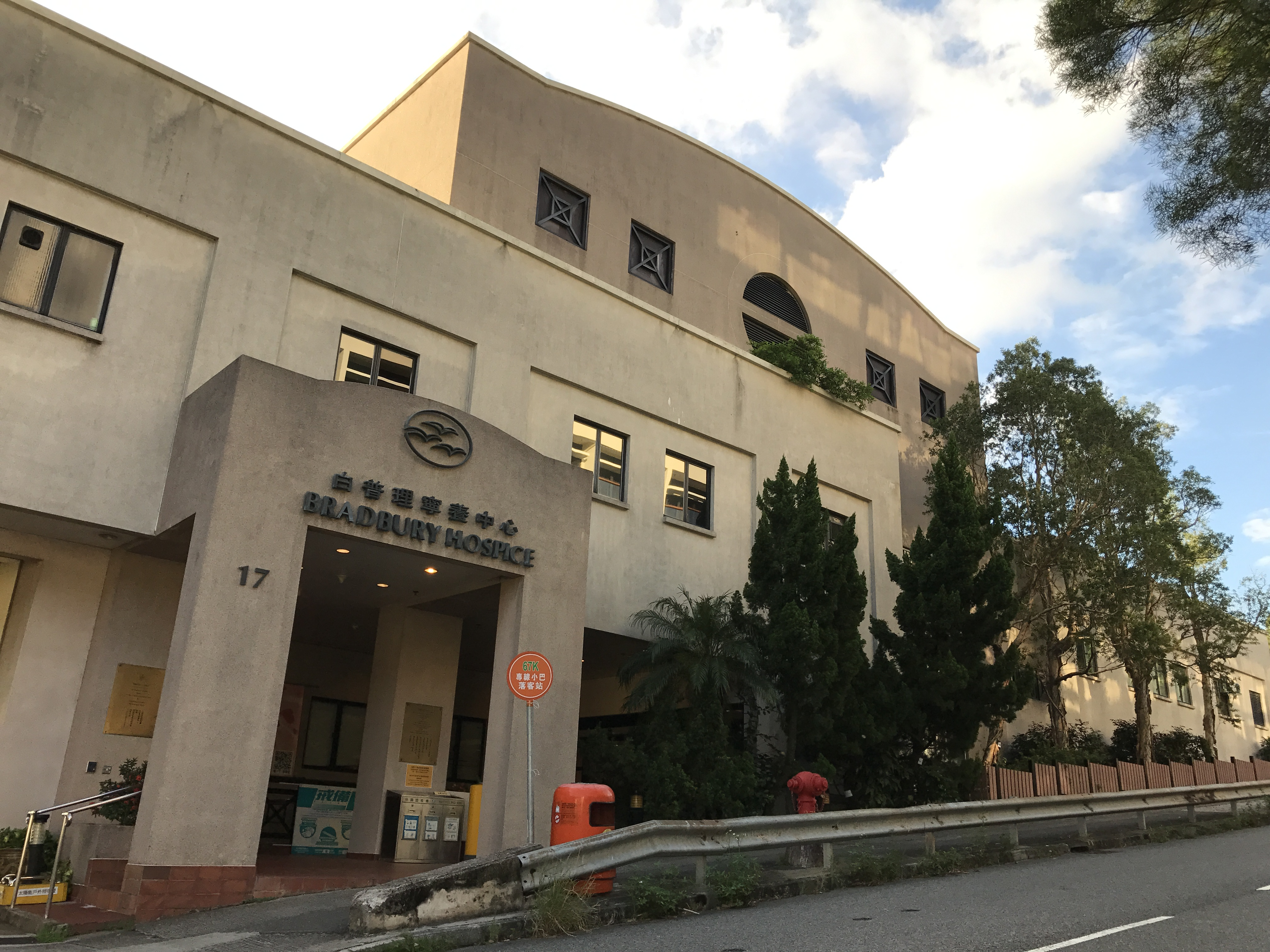
Bradbury Hospice

=== Jessie and Thomas Tam Centre ===
In 1997, SPHC opened the Jessie and Thomas Tam Centre, the first community-based centre for bereavement support in Hong Kong. The centre provides services to the public free-of-charge with the support of charitable donations.

=== Jockey Club Home for Hospice ===
In 2012, SPHC commenced the construction of Jockey Club Home for Hospice (JCHH) following a grant of land by the Government of Hong Kong and funding by the Hong Kong Jockey Club Charities Trust. The 30-bed hospice opened in September 2017 and is located in Shatin, directly opposite Bradbury Hospice. The SPHC headquarters relocated to JCHH upon its completion.

== Jockey Club Home for Hospice ==
Jockey Club Home for Hospice is an independent 30-bed hospice that provides 24-hour comprehensive, patient-centred palliative care for patients with life-limiting illnesses and their significant others. It adopts a family-oriented approach that emphasizes the involvement of family members in patient care. Active family participation will likely act as a future buffer against complicated grief and improve the quality of death.

JCHH is staffed with a multidisciplinary team of palliative doctors, nurses, personal care workers, allied health professionals, and social workers. Financial assistance is available to eligible underprivileged patients. Aside from patient care, the hospice is also used for professional training and educational programmes.

=== Facilities ===
- 30 private ensuite rooms
- Garden
- Quiet Room
- Farewell Room
- Mortuary
- Pharmacy
- Play room
- Lecture theatre

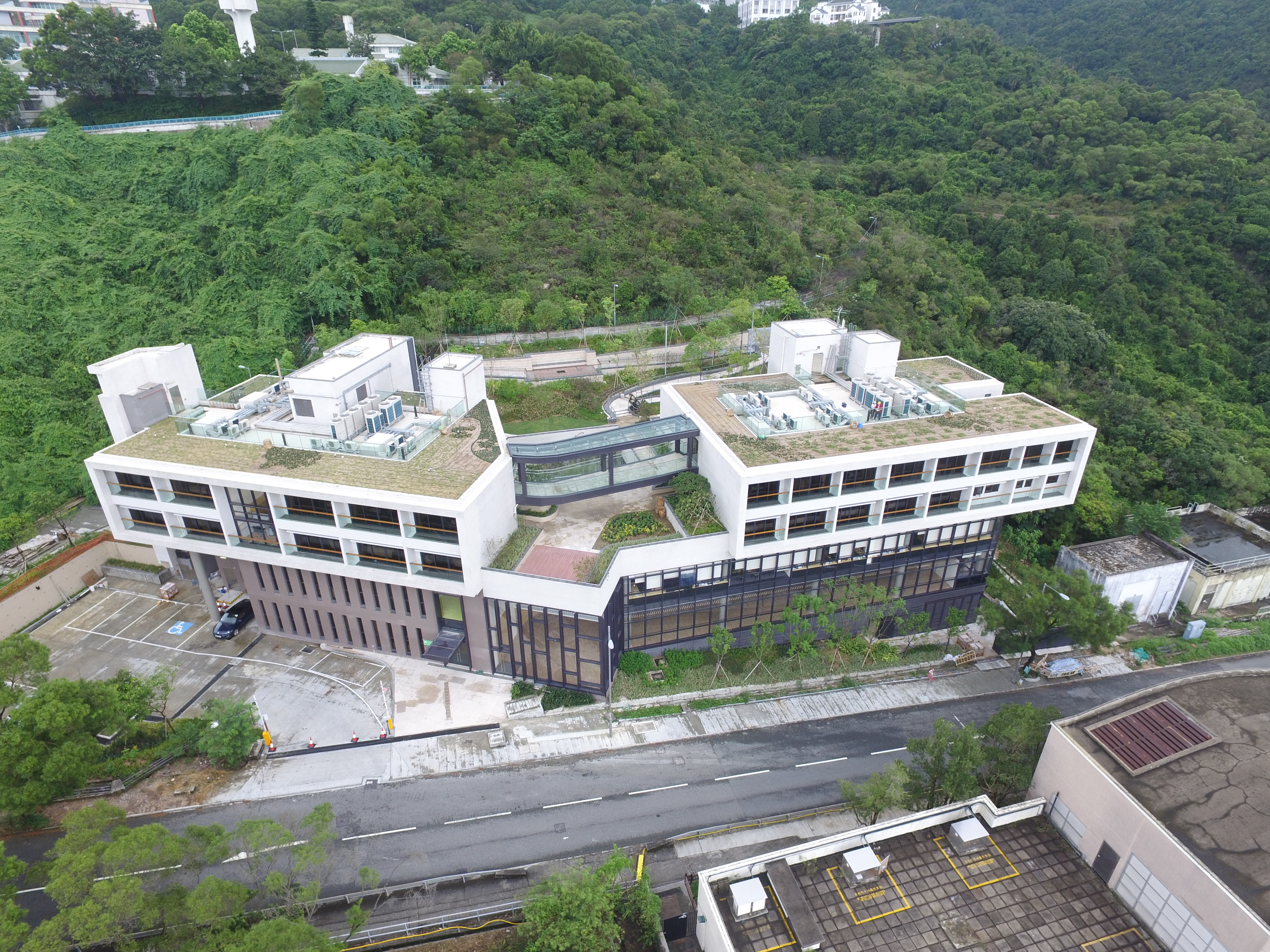
Aerial view of JCHH

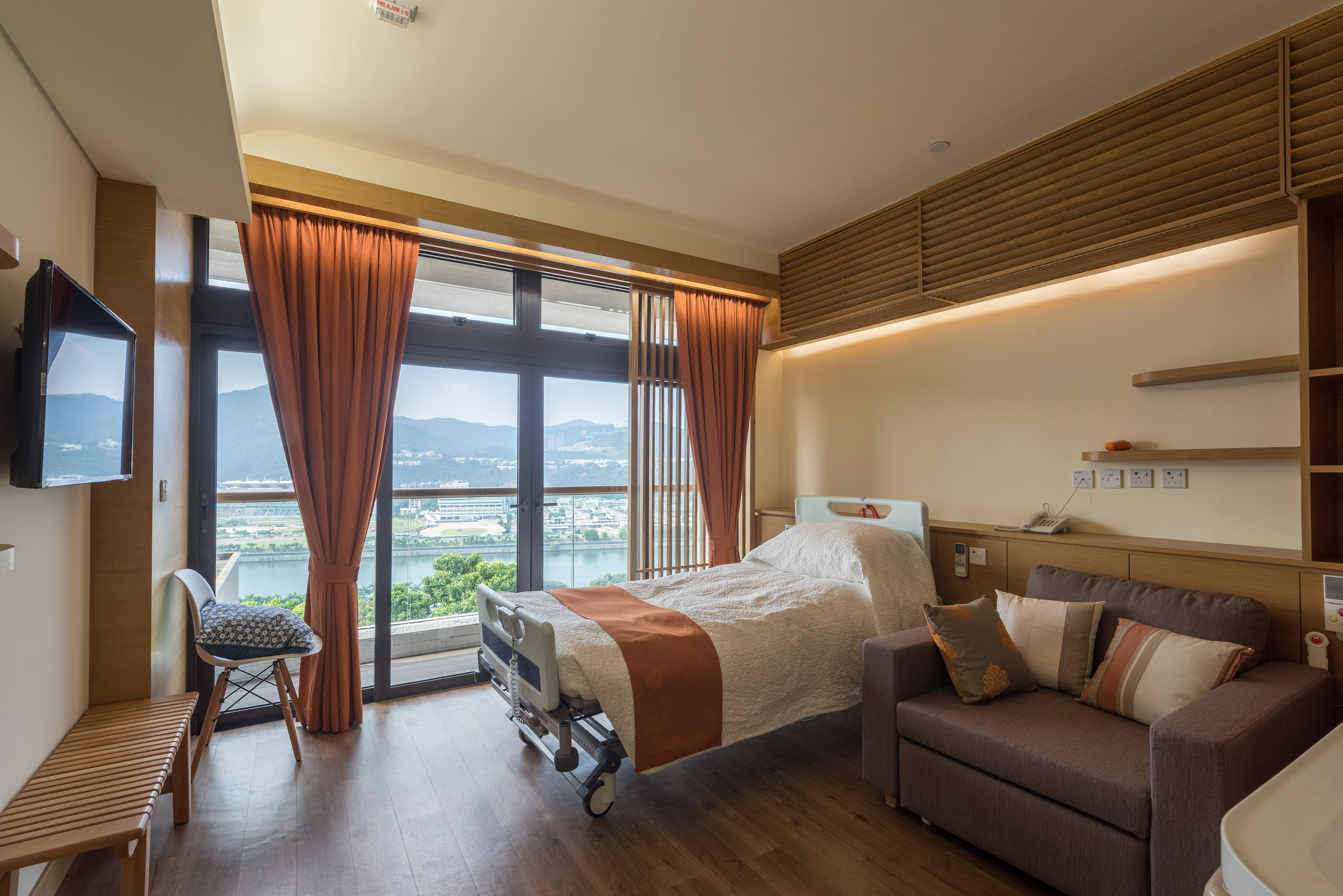
Ensuite room

=== Services ===
- In-patient care
- Home care
- Day care
- Bereavement support
- Physiotherapy
- Occupational therapy
- Clinical psychology
- Social work
- Aromatherapy
- Massage therapy
- Hypnotherapy
- Carer training

== Education and training ==
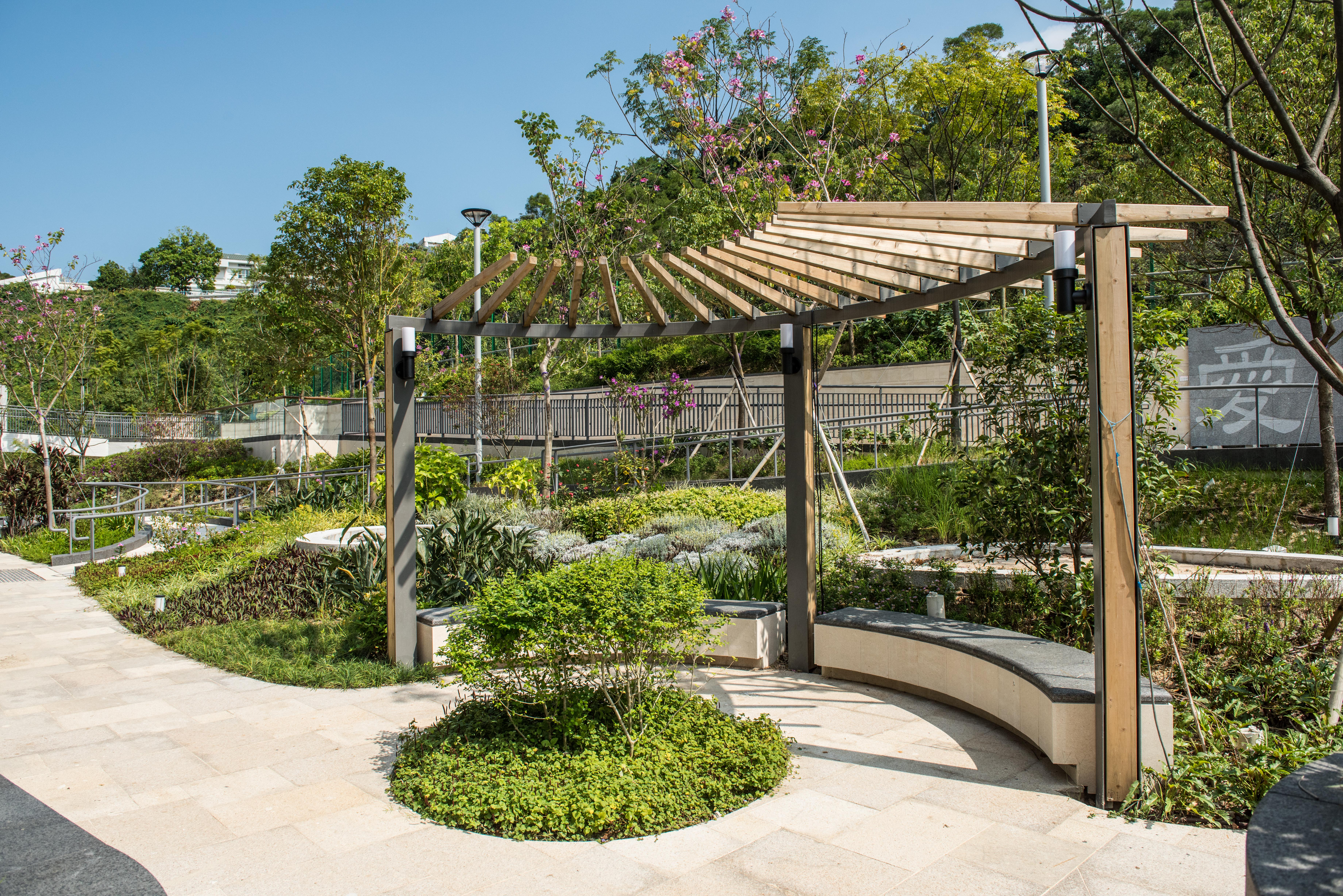
Garden

SPHC uses education and training to promote and raise the standard of palliative care in Hong Kong. Since 2004, SPHC has organized the annual Hong Kong Palliative Care Symposium (香港紓緩照顧專業研討會). In 2009, the 3G Quality Retirement Programme (3G 圓滿人生輔工課程) was initiated to promote healthy and productive aging among retirees. As of 2019, 22 3G courses have been completed. SPHC is the first palliative care training provider in Hong Kong and regularly offers classes on end-of-life care, bereavement support, and advanced care planning to both local and visiting participants.

== Funding ==
SPHC is a self-financed organisation and does not receive government subventions or annual grants to support its administrative and operating expenses. Jockey Club Home is funded entirely through service income and voluntary contributions from individuals, companies, and charitable foundations.

Three signature fundraising events are held annually to help subsidize palliative care for the underprivileged:

=== Hike for Hospice ===
Hike for Hospice is an annual fundraising event first held in 1992. Hikers may participate under one of four categories – Individual, Team, Corporate Challenge, and Alumni Challenge. A longstanding tradition is the serving of Indian-style curry after the hike. The current Organizing Committee Chairman is Edward Naylor.

=== Light Up a Life Concert ===
Light Up a Life Concert is a fundraising event held annually at St. John’s Cathedral. The concert debuted in 1990 and featured festive music by the Hong Kong Welsh Male Voice Choir and the Island School Orchestra and Choir. Guests may also take part in a tree lighting ceremony in remembrance of the departed. The current Organizing Committee Chairman is Andrew Williamson.

=== Senior E-Sports and Experience Day ===
Senior E-Sports and Experience Day is an annual fundraising event organized in partnership with the Federation of Hong Kong Industries and the Hong Kong Cyberport Management Company Limited. The event was first held in 2018 and aims to promote happy and healthy aging through technology, specifically in the form of a football e-tournament for elderly participants.

== Governance ==
The Executive Committee is the highest governing body of SPHC, consisting of 20 members and 4 co-opted members as of July 2019. New members are selected at the Annual General Meeting each December. The current Chairman is Dr Hubert Chan, who has held the position since 2017.

== See also ==
- Healthcare in Hong Kong
- Nursing in Hong Kong
