= Wu Ting-fang =

Premier of the Republic of China (1842–1922)

Wu Ting-fang JP
- 伍廷芳
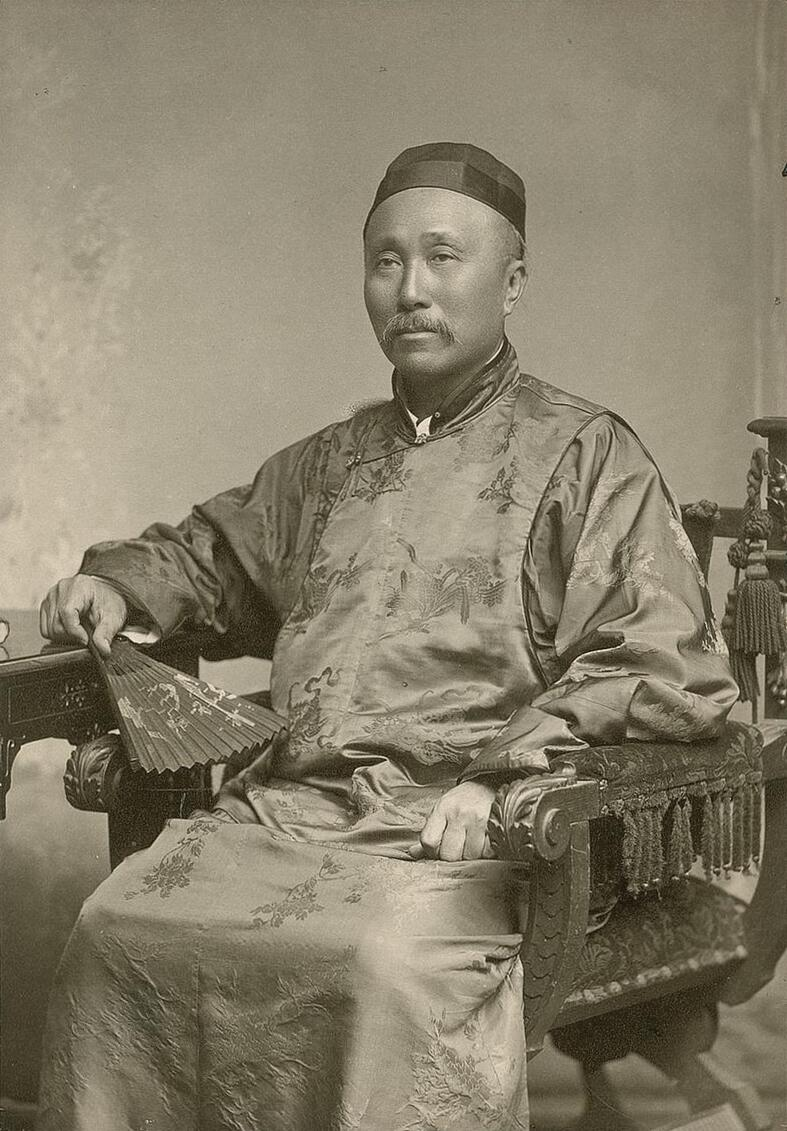
- Wu in 1902

Premier of China
- Acting; 23 May 1917 – 12 June 1917
- President: Li Yuanhong; Feng Guozhang (acting)
- Preceded by: Duan Qirui
- Succeeded by: Jiang Chaozong (acting)

Minister of Foreign Affairs
- In office 1921–1922
- Preceded by: Lu Zhengxiang
- Succeeded by: Wang Daxie

Chinese Ambassador to the United States
- In office 8 March 1908 – 12 August 1909
- Monarchs: Guangxu Emperor; Xuantong Emperor
- Preceded by: Zhou Ziqi
- Succeeded by: Zhang Yintang
- In office 23 November 1896 – 12 July 1902
- Monarch: Guangxu Emperor
- Preceded by: Yang Yu
- Succeeded by: Liang Cheng

Chinese Unofficial Member of the Legislative Council of Hong Kong
- In office 1880–1882
- Appointed by: Sir John Pope Hennessy

Personal details
- Born: 30 July 1842 Malacca, Straits Settlements
- Died: 23 June 1922 (aged 79) Canton, Guangdong, Republic of China
- Party: Republican Party; Progressive Party
- Children: Wu Chaoshu
- Education: St. Paul's College; Lincoln's Inn
- Occupation: Calligrapher, diplomat, politician, writer
- Profession: Lawyer
- Awards: Order of Rank and Merit; Order of the Precious Brilliant Golden Grain; Order of the Rising Sun.

Wu Ting-fang
- Chinese: 伍廷芳
Transcriptions
Standard Mandarin
- Hanyu Pinyin: Wǔ Tíngfāng
- Wade–Giles: Wu^{3} T'ing^{2}-fang^{1}
- IPA: [ù tʰǐŋfáŋ]
Yue: Cantonese
- Yale Romanization: Ng Tìhngfōng
- Jyutping: Ng^{5} Ting^{4}-fong^{1}
- IPA: [ŋ tʰɪŋ˩fɔŋ˥]

Ng Choy
- Chinese: 伍才
Transcriptions
Standard Mandarin
- Hanyu Pinyin: Wǔ Cái
- Wade–Giles: Wu3 Ts'ai2
Yue: Cantonese
- Yale Romanization: Ng Chói
- Jyutping: Ng5 coi4

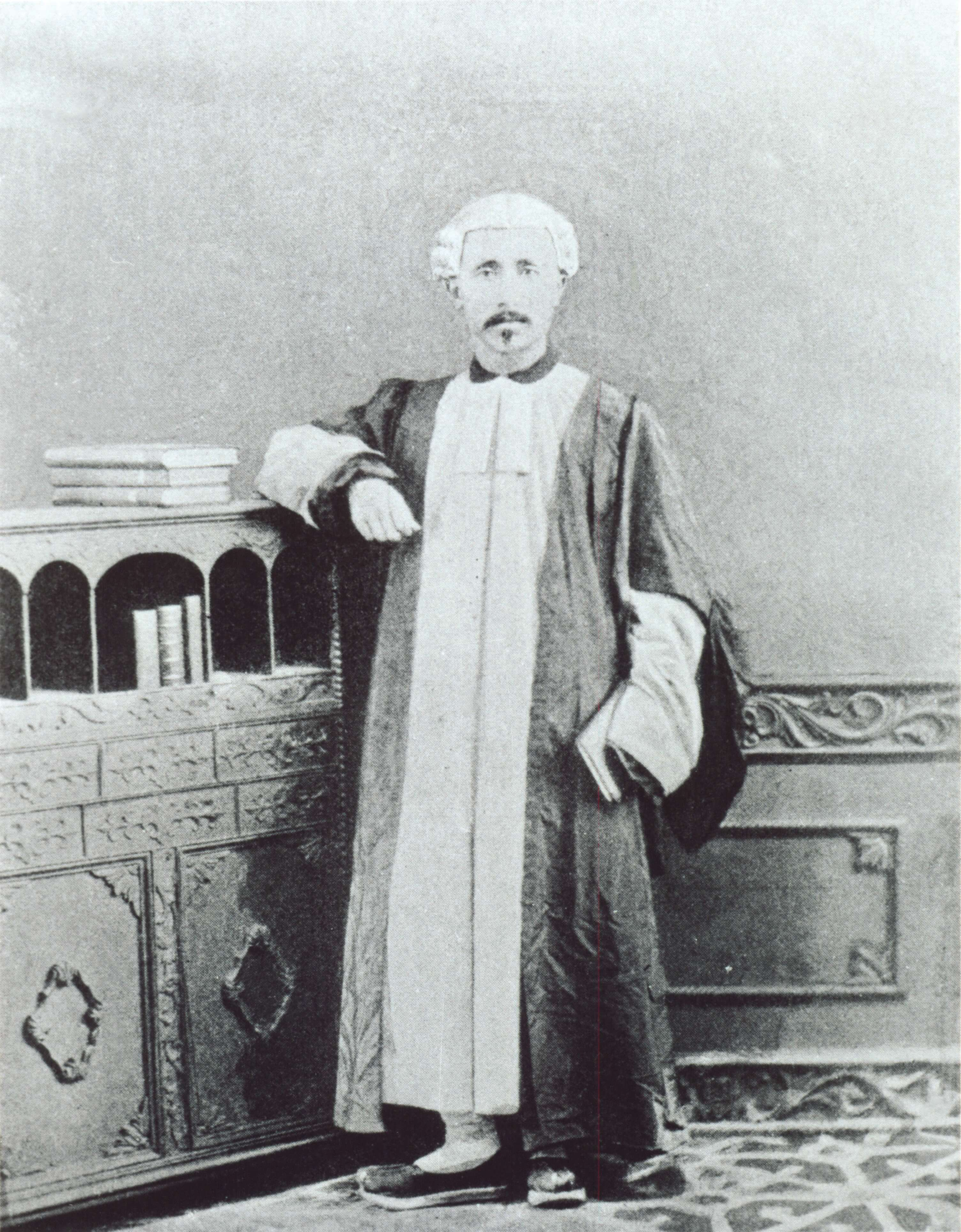
Wu as a barrister

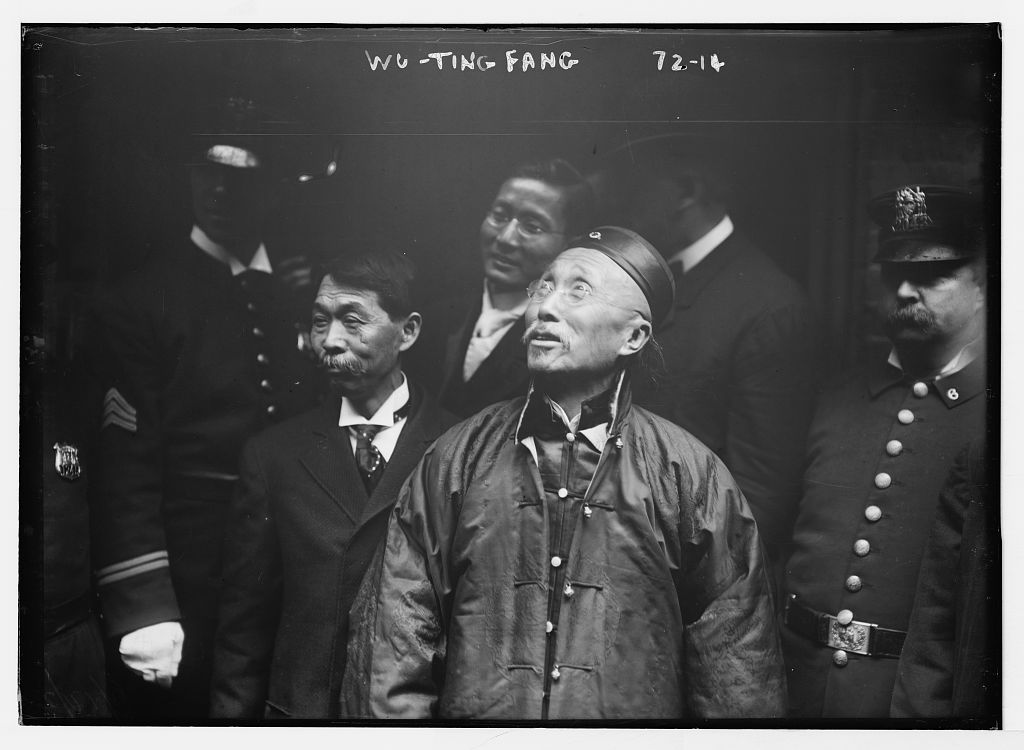
Wu c. 1908

Wu Ting-fang (Chinese: 伍廷芳; 30 July 1842 – 23 June 1922) was a Chinese calligrapher, diplomat, lawyer, politician, and writer who served as Minister of Foreign Affairs and briefly as Acting Premier during the early years of the Republic of China. He was also known as Ng Choy or Ng Achoy (Chinese: 伍才; pinyin: Wǔ Cái).

== Education and career in Hong Kong ==
Wu was born in the Straits Settlement, now modern-day Malacca, in 1842 and was sent to China in 1846 to be schooled. He studied at the Anglican St. Paul's College, in Hong Kong where he learned to read and write in English. After serving as an interpreter in the Magistrate's Court from 1861 to 1874, he married Ho Miu-ling (sister of Sir Kai Ho) in 1864.

He studied law in the United Kingdom and was called to the bar at Lincoln's Inn (1876). Wu became the first ethnic Chinese barrister in history. He returned to Hong Kong in 1877 to practise law. He was admitted as a barrister in Hong Kong in a ceremony that May before Chief Justice John Smale who observed:

I am glad to see a Chinaman running in the race the most highly intellectual in the world. I am glad to see that a Chinaman ... has become a member of the English Bar. In England, every office becomes open to talent without favour or affection. A distinguished American statesman [Judah P. Benjamin] has become, and now is an ornament of the English bar, and all the Bar will gladly hail the time when a Chinaman shall distinguish himself as much as the eminent counsel to whom I refer. I have seen stranger things happen.

In 1880, Wu became the first ethnic Chinese Unofficial member of the Legislative Council of Hong Kong and was appointed acting Police Magistrate.

== Service under the Qing dynasty ==
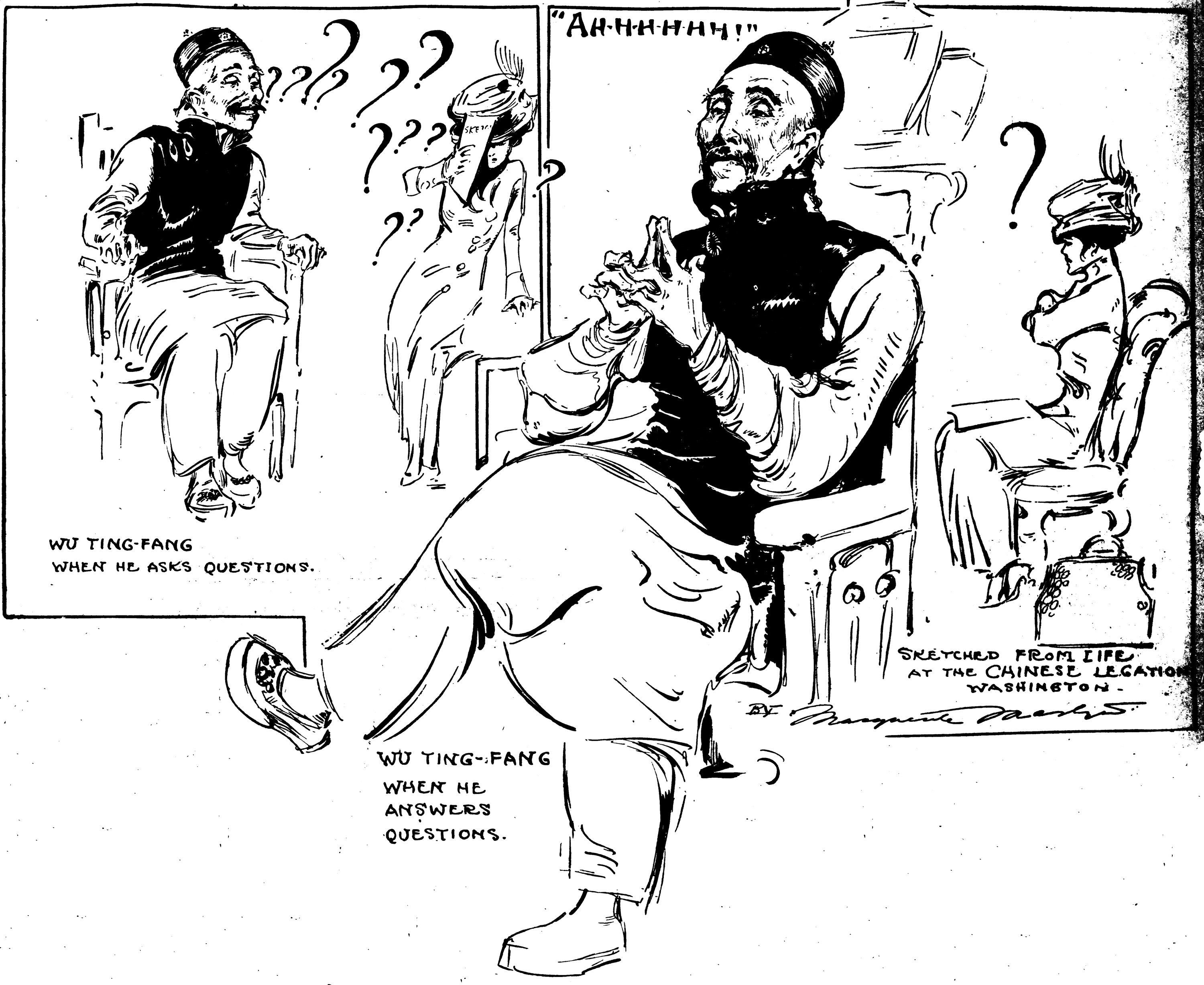
Journalist Marguerite Martyn illustrates her interview in Washington, D.C., with Wu, retiring minister from China to the United States. From the St. Louis Post-Dispatch of October 24, 1909.

He served under the Qing dynasty as Minister to the United States, Spain, and Peru from 1896 to 1902 and from 1907 to 1909, having started out as legal adviser and interpreter to powerful diplomat and viceroy Li Hongzhang. As the minister, he lectured widely about Chinese culture and history, in part working to counter discrimination against Chinese emigrants by increasing foreign appreciation of their background. To further this end, he wrote America, Through the Spectacles of an Oriental Diplomat in English in 1914.

Wu is mentioned several times in the diaries of Sir Ernest Satow who was British Envoy in China, 1900–06. For example, on 21 November 1903: "Wu Tingfang came in the afternoon, and stopped talking for an hour and a half about his commercial code and connected subjects. His idea is to draft also a new criminal code, and put both into force at the outset in the open ports."

Wu had an opportunity to implement his ideas about Chinese law reform between 1903 and 1906, when he (together with Shen Jiaben) were put in charge of reforming the Qing imperial code. His efforts included modernising the criminal code and abolishing inhumane methods of capital punishment such as death by a thousand cuts, decapitation and posthumous execution, and use of torture in interrogations. He also reformed the governmental structure for the administration of justice, ending the traditional combined approach. Sun Yat-sen praised Wu's contributions, saying that he began a "new epoch" for Chinese criminal law.

In an interview with American journalist Marguerite Martyn, Wu Tingfang argued in favor of women's suffrage.

== Service post Xinhai Revolution ==
He supported the Xinhai Revolution of 1911 and negotiated on the revolutionaries' behalf in Shanghai. He served briefly in early 1912 as Minister of Justice for the Nanjing Provisional Government, where he argued strongly for an independent judiciary, based on his experience studying law and travelling overseas. After this brief posting, Wu became Minister of Foreign Affairs for the ROC. He served briefly in 1917 as Acting Premier of the Republic of China.

In 1915, Wu was the President of the Far Eastern Athletic Association, which sponsored the Far Eastern Championship Games.

He joined Sun Yat-sen's Constitutional Protection Movement and became a member of its governing committee. He advised Sun against becoming the "extraordinary president" but stuck with Sun after the election. He then served as Sun's foreign minister and as acting president when Sun was absent. He died shortly after Chen Jiongming rebelled against Sun in 1922.

== Vegetarianism ==
Wu was a vegetarian who consumed eggs and milk (ovo-lacto vegetarian). He believed that a non-flesh diet would prolong his life and he would live over a hundred years. Wu abstained from alcohol and tobacco after reading Mary Foote Henderson's book The Aristocracy of Health. He gave speeches on vegetarianism and authored an article "How I Expect to Live Long", published in November 1909 for the Ladies' Home Journal.

Wu founded the Rational Diet Society in Shanghai, also known as the Society for Cautious Diet and Hygiene (Shenshi Weisheng Hui) with Li Shizeng in September, 1910. It was the first vegetarian organization in Shanghai and had about 300 members. The society met at Wu's residence for lectures on the dangers of alcohol, meat-eating and tobacco. Wu also established a vegetarian restaurant known as Micaili in Shanghai at Hotel des Colonies in the French Concession (now on East Yan'an Road). It was the first vegetarian restaurant in China to experiment with western vegetarian cuisine. His public lectures on dieting were influential. Wu and his Society argued for the public to eat more wheat. The Society introduced a Western-styled bakery to the Shanghainese that offered home-delivered wheat flour bread.

Wu was an anti-smoking activist. An offshoot of the Rational Diet Society was the Anti-Cigarette Smoking Society that formed in June, 1911. The Society warned the public about the health dangers of cigarette smoking. Wu wrote about the subject in his book Yanshou xinfa (New Methods to Prolong Life), in 1914. Wu was an enthusiastic bicycle rider.

== Death ==
Wu died on 23 June 1922 from pneumonia at the age of 79.

Wu's tomb was moved to Yuexiu Hill in Guangzhou in 1988, where it forms an ensemble with the tomb of his son Wu Chaoshu and the memorial tablet bearing an inscription by Sun Yat-sen dedicated to Wu Tingfang.

== In popular culture ==
Wu is caricatured in "The Chinese Minister Wu", one of the Mr. Dooley columns of Finley Peter Dunne, where he is depicted bamboozling "Sicrety iv State Hay".

== Selected publications ==
- How I Expect to Live Long (1909)
- America and the Americans: From a Chinese Point of View (1914)
- America: Through the Spectacles of an Oriental Diplomat (1914)
- American Manners (1915)

Legislative Council of Hong Kong
Preceded by Hugh Bold Gibb	Unofficial Member; 1880–1882	Succeeded by Frederick Stewart as unofficial
New office	Senior Chinese Unofficial Member; 1880–1882	Vacant Title next held by Wong Shing
Political offices
Preceded by Duan Qirui	Premier of China; 23–25 May 1917	Succeeded by Li Jingxi
