= Sinology =

Area studies focused on China

Chinese name
- Traditional Chinese: 漢學
- Simplified Chinese: 汉学
Transcriptions
Standard Mandarin
- Hanyu Pinyin: hànxué
- Bopomofo: ㄏㄢˋ ㄒㄩㄝˊ
- Wade–Giles: han^{4}-hsüeh^{2}
- Tongyong Pinyin: hàn-syué
- IPA: [xân.ɕɥě]
Yue: Cantonese
- Jyutping: hon3 hok6
- IPA: [hɔn˧ hɔk̚˨]
Southern Min
- Hokkien POJ: hàn-ha̍k

Vietnamese name
- Vietnamese: Hán học

Korean name
- Hangul: 한학
- Hanja: 漢學
Transcriptions
- Revised Romanization: hanhak
- McCune–Reischauer: hanhak

Japanese name
- Kanji: 漢学
- Hiragana: かんがく
- Katakana: カンガク
Transcriptions
- Romanization: kangaku

Sinology, also referred to as China studies or Chinese studies, is the academic discipline of studying China, including Chinese culture, Chinese history, and the Chinese language. It is a subfield of East Asian studies involved in social sciences and humanities research on any topic relating to China. It focuses on the study of the Chinese civilization primarily through linguistics, history, culture, literature, philosophy, art, music, cinema, and science. Its origin "may be traced to the examination which Chinese scholars made of their own civilization."

The academic field of sinology often refers to Western scholarship. Until the 20th century, it was historically seen as equivalent to philology concerning the Chinese classics and other literature written in the Chinese language. Since then, the scope of sinology has expanded to include Chinese history and palaeography, among other subjects.

== Terminology ==
The terms sinology and sinologist were coined around 1838, derived from Late Latin Sinae, in turn from the Greek Sinae, from the Arabic Sin—which ultimately derive from Qin, i.e. the Qin dynasty.

In the context of area studies, the European and the American usages may differ. In Europe, sinology is usually known as "Chinese studies", whereas in the United States, sinology is a subfield of Chinese studies. Similar concepts include China Hands, foreigners with extensive practical knowledge and experience in China, and China watchers, foreign commentators on Chinese politics.

== Japanese sinology ==
In Japan, sinology was known as kangaku. It was contrasted with the study of Japan (kokugaku) as well as with the study of the West (first rangaku, then more broadly yōgaku). This historical field is distinguished from modern sinology.

== Chinese sinology ==
In modern China, the studies of China-related subjects is known as "national studies" (国学; 國學; guóxué), and foreign sinology is translated as "Han studies" (汉学; 漢學; Hànxué).

== Western sinology ==
=== Early modern era ===
The earliest Westerners known to have studied Chinese in significant numbers were 16th-century Portuguese, Spanish, and Italian missionaries. All were either Jesuits or Dominicans seeking to spread Catholic Christianity to the Chinese people. An early Spanish Dominican mission in Manila operated a printing press; between 1593 and 1607, they produced four works on Catholic doctrine for the Chinese immigrant community, three in Literary Chinese and one in a mixture of Literary Chinese and vernacular Hokkien.

Dominican accomplishments among the Chinese diaspora pale in comparison to the success of the Jesuits in mainland China, led by the renowned pioneer Matteo Ricci. Ricci arrived in Guangzhou in 1583, and would spend the rest of his life in China. Unlike most of his predecessors and contemporaries, Ricci did not view the Chinese firstly as pagans or idolators, but as "like-minded literati approachable on the level of learning". Like Chinese literati, he studied the Confucian classics in order to present Catholic doctrine and European learning to the Chinese using their own terms.

=== 18th century ===
During the Age of Enlightenment, sinologists started to introduce Chinese philosophy, ethics, legal system, and aesthetics into the West. Though often unscientific and incomplete, their works inspired the development of chinoiserie and a series of debates comparing Chinese and Western cultures. At that time, sinologists often described China as an enlightened kingdom, comparing it to Europe, which had just emerged from the Dark Ages. Among the European literati interested in China was Voltaire, who wrote the play L'orphelin de la Chine inspired by The Orphan of Zhao, Leibniz who penned his famous Novissima Sinica (News from China) and Giambattista Vico.

Because Chinese texts did not have any major connections to most important European topics (such as the Bible), they were scarcely studied by European universities until around 1860. An exception to this was France, where Chinese studies were popularized owing to efforts from Louis XIV. In 1711, he appointed a young Chinese man named Arcadio Huang to catalog the royal collection of Chinese texts. Huang was assisted by Étienne Fourmont, who published a grammar of Chinese in 1742.

In 1732, Matteo Ripa, a missionary of the Neapolitan "Sacred Congregation" (De propaganda fide) founded the "Chinese Institute" in Naples—the first school of sinology on the European continent, and sanctioned by Pope Clement XII. The institute was first nucleus of what would become today's Università degli studi di Napoli L'Orientale. Ripa had worked as a painter and copper-engraver in the court of the Kangxi Emperor between 1711 and 1723, and returned to Naples with four young Chinese Christians, who all taught their native language and formed the institute to teach Chinese to missionaries en route to China.

=== 19th century ===
In 1814, a chair of Chinese and Manchu was founded at Collège de France. Jean-Pierre Abel-Rémusat, who taught himself Chinese, filled the position, becoming the first professor of Chinese in Europe. By then the first Russian sinologist, Nikita Bichurin, had been living in Beijing for ten years. Abel-Rémusat's counterparts in England and Germany were Samuel Kidd (1797–1843) and Wilhelm Schott (1807–1889) respectively, though the first important secular sinologists in these two countries were James Legge and Hans Georg Conon von der Gabelentz. In 1878, a professorship of Far Eastern languages, the first of its kind in the German-speaking world, was created at the University of Leipzig with von der Gabelentz taking the position. Scholars like Legge often relied on the work of ethnic Chinese scholars such as Wang Tao.

Stanislas Julien served as the chair of Chinese at the Collège de France for over 40 years, starting his studies with Rémusat and succeeding him in 1833. He was notable for his translations not only of classical texts but also works of vernacular literature, and for his knowledge of Manchu. Édouard Chavannes succeeded to the position after the death of Marquis d'Hervey-Saint-Denys in 1893. Chavannes pursued broad interests in history as well as language.

The image of China as an essentially Confucian society conveyed by Jesuit scholars dominated Western thought in these times. While some in Europe learned to speak Chinese, most studied written classical Chinese. These scholars were in what is called the "commentarial tradition" through critical annotated translation. This emphasis on translating classical texts inhibited the use of social science methodology or comparing these texts of other traditions. One scholar described this type of sinology as "philological hairsplitting" preoccupied with marginal or curious aspects. Secular scholars gradually came to outnumber missionaries, and in the 20th century sinology slowly gained a substantial presence in Western universities.

=== 20th and 21st centuries ===
The Paris-based type of sinology dominated learning about China until the Second World War even outside France. Paul Pelliot, Henri Maspero, and Marcel Granet both published basic studies and trained students. Pelliot's knowledge of the relevant languages, especially those of Central Asia, and control of bibliography in those languages, gave him the power to write on a range of topics and to criticize in damning detail the mistakes of other scholars. Maspero expanded the scope of sinology from Confucianism to include Daoism, Buddhism, and popular religion, as well as art, mythology, and the history of science. The contribution of Granet was to apply the concepts of Emile Durkheim, a pioneer sociologist, to the society of ancient China, especially the family and ritual, with "innovative, sometimes iconoclastic, interpretation of documents."

The Russian school of sinology was focused mainly on learning classical Chinese texts. For example, the contribution of the Russian sinologist Julian Shchutsky was especially valuable. The best full translation of the I Ching (Book of Changes) was made by him in 1937. Later his translation was translated in English and other European languages.

After the proclamation of the People's Republic of China in 1949, China studies developed along diverging lines. The rise of Area studies, the role of China watchers, and the growth of university graduate programs has changed the role of sinology. Funding for Chinese and Taiwanese studies comes from a variety of sources; one prominent source is the Chiang Ching-kuo Foundation.

The Area studies approach, especially in the United States, challenged the dominance of classical sinology. Scholars such as John King Fairbank promoted the "study of China within a discipline," an approach which downplayed the role of philological sinology and focused on issues in history and the social sciences.

One of the earliest American scholars of Cold War China and Sino-American relations was Chinese-American Tang Tsou of the University of Chicago. Tsou emphasized the importance of academic objectivity in general and in sinology in particular, stressing that intellectual and academic exchange between China and the West was the only way for both parties to come to a greater understanding of one another.

In 1964 an exchange in the pages of the Journal of Asian Studies debated the continued relevance of sinology. The anthropologist G. William Skinner called for the social sciences to make more use of China, but wrote "In recent years the cry has gone up: Sinology is dead; long live Chinese studies!" and concluded that "Sinology, a discipline unto itself, is being replaced by Chinese studies, a multidisciplinary endeavour with specific research objectives." Joseph Levenson, a historian, went further. He doubted that sinology was a tool that social scientists would still find useful, while another historian, Benjamin I. Schwartz, on the other hand, replied that the disciplines were too often treated as ends in themselves. Sinology had its backers. Frederick W. Mote, a specialist in traditional China, replying to Skinner, spoke up for sinology, which he saw as a field or discipline in itself. Another specialist in traditional China, Denis Twitchett, in reply to the back and forth of this debate, issued what he called "A Lone Cheer for Sinology". He did not accept the assumption that there is "some implicit hostility between 'Sinology' and the disciplines of history and social sciences." Sinology, he continued, is used in too a wide range of meanings to be so confined:

At one extreme it is used to characterize a rather ridiculous caricature compounded of pedantry and preoccupation with peripheral and precious subjects of little general significance.... At the other extreme, the definition used by Prof. Mote is so broad and all-inclusive as to mean little more than the humanistic studies in the Chinese field.

During the Cold War, China Watchers centered in Hong Kong, especially American government officials or journalists. Mutual distrust between the United States and China and the prohibition of travel between the countries meant they did not have access to press briefings or interviews. They therefore adopted techniques from Kremlinology, such as the close parsing of official announcements for hidden meanings, movements of officials reported in newspapers, and analysis of photographs of public appearances. But in the years since the opening of China, China watchers can live in China and take advantage of normal sources of information.

Towards the end of the century, many of those studying China professionally called for an end to the split between sinology and the disciplines. The Australian scholar Geremie Barmé, for instance, suggests a "New Sinology", one which "emphasizes strong scholastic underpinnings in both the classical and modern Chinese language and studies, at the same time as encouraging an ecumenical attitude in relation to a rich variety of approaches and disciplines, whether they be mainly empirical or more theoretically inflected."

In Germany, with long-established traditions of "Sinologie" (Sinology), fierce debates have unfolded in recent years over whether Sinologists should condone China's atrocities against the Uyghurs in Xinjiang, and other human rights abuses. Aspects of earlier phases of these debates were summarized in 2018 by Didi Kirsten Tatlow and later by Andreas Fulda. Op-eds in the FAZ and other German newspapers and media outlets followed. In 2023, an op-ed in the Neue Zürcher Zeitung by Sinologists Thomas Heberer and Helwig Schmidt-Glintzer, favoring China's policies and seeing a normalisation in Xinjiang after their field trip in May 2023, sparked more debate and responses in the NZZ, including fellow Sinologist Kai Vogelsang's response that German Sinology was now "bankrupt". Heberer and Schmidt-Glintzer's NZZ op-ed provoked a strong reaction within the field of German speaking China studies. It led to the German China Studies association (the Deutsche Vereinigung für Chinastudien) issuing a warning to its members that "Representatives of sinology have a very special responsibility to live up to their public role by guarding against suspicions of appropriation." Still, Schmidt-Glintzer (one of the authors that praised Beijing's policies) later accepted an award from the Chinese state. The award and their subsequent publication on the results of their field trip to Xinjiang was sharply criticized by a fellow sinologist, Björn Alpermann, as "naive empiricism". Sascha Klotzbücher reviewed this edited volume as a "disturbing read, with its explicit onesideness...".

== Arab sinology ==
=== Before 1900 ===
Chinese historical sources indicate that the Chinese had knowledge of the Arabs several centuries before Islam, as the history of relations between the two civilizations dates back to the pre-Islamic era. The policy of the Han Dynasty (206 BC) aimed at opening trade routes with the western regions, which are today called Central Asia, India and Western Asia, extending to the Arabian Peninsula and Africa. Historical studies confirmed that Muslim Arabs entered China during the early days of Islam to spread the religion, when four of Muhammad's companions namely Saad bin Abi Waqqas, Jaafar bin Abi Talib, and Jahsh bin Riab preached in China in the year 616/17. During the reign of Emperor Yongle, the first Chinese fleet arrived on the shores of the Arabian Peninsula, led by Zheng He, on his fourth voyage in 1412 AD. It is clear from the foregoing that there had been friction between China and the Arabs from a long time ago, and that there are cultural and commercial relations existing between the Arab and Chinese civilizations, which required the visiting Arabs to learn the Chinese language and vice versa. However, there are no texts indicating that the Arabs during this period studied the Chinese language or culture beyond what their missionary or trades affairs demanded, and the reason for this is due to the fact that the purpose of the visits was often to trade or to spread Islam.

At the beginning of the seventh century until the eighth century, the power of the Arabs increased due to the expansion of Islam and its spread throughout the world, and their control expanded to the east and west. Their power was strengthened by their vast lands, their advanced network of postal stations, and the pilgrimage to Mecca, in addition to the flourishing of land and sea trade. All this led to the advancement of their studies in geography and thus, new knowledge about China found its way to the Arab world. Up to the twelfth century, the Arabs possessed exclusive knowledge about the East, and they were contributing to the transmission of knowledge to the West, which contributed to the advancement of Islamic civilization and its impact on world culture.

Arabs such as Abu al-Hasan Ali al-Masoudi, who is a well-known historical figure in the Arabian Peninsula, made significant contributions to sinology. Al-Masoudi has traveled all over the world since he was a child, visiting faraway places. In the year 915, he visited India, Ceylon, Champa, and the coastal regions of China, and then visited Zabagh and Turkistan in Central Asia. He died in the year 956, and he is the author of the book "Meadows of Gold", which deals with history, geography, and other fields. He had many records about China, and these records were popular among orient scholars.

Abu Zayd's book "On China and India" was a well-known and highly regarded Arabic historical material. The book had two separate parts, the first part was "History of Indian and Chinese Affairs" by an unknown author, and the second part was "A Collection of Rumors of India and China" by Abu Zayd. The first part was a selection from Solomon's "Chinese experiences" and other anonymous sources, written and recorded in 851, together with their experiences in India.

=== 20th century and after ===
During the 20th century, projects of cooperation between China and the Arab countries led to the development of sinology in the Arab countries nominally after expanding the scope of Chinese-Arab cooperation in the field of education, with some difference according to the level of cooperation. Since the establishment of diplomatic relations between China and Egypt in 1956, Egypt began to open the Chinese language specialization course in Egyptian universities, but on a small scale at that time. Ain Shams University opened the Chinese language specialization in 1958. However, the course was stopped for prevailing political reasons at the time. In the period between 1958 and 1963, 33 Chinese language students graduated from Egyptian universities. In 1977, Ain Shams University reintroduced the sinology specialization course. In addition to Egypt, there were activities to teach the Chinese language in Kuwait as well, but they stopped after a short period.

The number of Arabs that learn the Chinese Language has increased. The Chinese Language Department at Ain Shams University is a major center for teaching the Chinese language in Egypt and one of the notable centers for teaching the Chinese language in the Arab world and Africa in terms of student size, teaching quality, and the level of teachers and staff. The Bourguiba Institute for Modern Languages was also opened in Tunisia, and it specializes in the Chinese language in 1977. Cairo University also established the Chinese Language Department in September 2004 becoming a major center for sinology is North Africa.

Arab scholars sought to delve deeper into sinology for academic, political, cultural and diplomatic purposes in order to build a bridge of communication between the Arab and Chinese peoples. Their interest in the history of China also increased greatly. Many books related to the history of Chinese culture and its people were published in the Arabic language. In 2020 after spending about six years as a consul in Guangzhou, Ali bin Ghanem Al-Hajri, a Qatari diplomat who is considered one of the Arabs with a lot of original Arabic academic works in sinology, published the book "Zheng He, Chinese Emperor of the Seas". The book covers the history and adventures of a Chinese commander by the name Zheng He whose fleet went round the known world in seven voyages between the years 1415 and 1432. He also wrote before that the novel "The Fleet of the Sun" inspired by the story of the Chinese commander. It was considered the first Arabic novel with a Chinese as the central character, thus it achieved some fame in the Arab world, although it was not published until recently. He also published "China in the Eyes of Travelers", a book that delved deep into the history of ancient China through the discoveries made by travellers and explorers. Al-hajri further wrote the book "Arts in the Ming Dynasty", in which he elaborated on the political and economic development of the Ming Dynasty and the historical development of Chinese culture. Four of his books are translated into Chinese

Many books have been translated from Chinese into Arabic as part of these efforts. Where more than 700 books about the people of China, their culture, economy, literature and philosophy have been translated into Arabic by the (House of Wisdom) company located in the Ningxia Hui region, northwest China since its establishment in 2011.

== Universities with sinology master programmes ==
=== European universities ===
University	Master programmes	Location	University type
University of Freiburg	M.A. Modern China Studies M.Ed. Chinesisch	Germany Freiburg im Breisgau	Public university
University of Tübingen	M.A. Sinologie/Chinese Studies M.A. Politik und Gesellschaft Ostasiens M.Ed. Chinesisch M.Sc. International Business with East Asia Track (Sinologie/Chinese Studies)	Germany Tübingen	Public university
Free University of Berlin	M.A. Chinastudien M.A. Integrierte Chinastudien M.A. Global East Asia M.Ed. Chinesisch	Germany Berlin	Public university
University of Erlangen-Nuremberg	M.A. Chinese Studies M.A. Standards of Decision-Making Across Cultures	Germany Nuremberg	Public university
University of Göttingen	M.A. Modern Sinology M.Ed. Chinesisch als Fremdsprache M.A./LLM Chinesisches Recht & Rechtsvergleichung	Germany Göttingen	Public university
Western Ruhr University of Applied Sciences	M.A. BWL - Asienmanagement	Germany Mühlheim	Public university of applied sciences
Humboldt University of Berlin	M.A. Asien-/Afrikastudien, Specialization East Asia	Germany Berlin	Public university
Goethe University Frankfurt	M.A. Sinologie M.A. Modern East Asian Studies	Germany Frankfurt	Public university
University of Würzburg	M.A. Chinese Studies M.A. Chinese Politics and Society M.A. China Language and Economy M.Sc. China Business and Economics	Germany Würzburg	Public university
LMU Munich	M.A. Sinologie M.A. Religion und Philosophie in Asien	Germany Munich	Public university
University of Bonn	M.A. Asienwissenschaften	Germany Bonn	Public university
Ruhr University Bochum	M.A. Sinologie M.A. International Political Economy of East Asia M.A. Ostasienwissenschaften M.A. Sprachen und Kulturen Ostasiens M.Ed. Chinesisch	Germany Bochum	Public university
Heidelberg University	M.A. Sinologie M.Ed. Chinesisch	Germany Heidelberg	Public university
University of Duisburg-Essen	M.A. Contemporary East Asian Studies M.A. Modern East Asian Studies	Germany Duisburg	Public university
University of Hamburg	M.A. Sinologie	Germany Hamburg	Public university
University of Leipzig	M.A. Chinese Studies	Germany Leipzig	Public university
University of Münster	M.A. Sinologie	Germany Münster	Public university
University of Trier	M.A. China - Tradition und Zukunft	Germany Trier	Public university
University of Cologne	M.A. Chinastudien M.A. Regionalstudien China M.A. Komparatistik	Germany Cologne	Public university
University of Applied Sciences Zwickau	M.A. Languages and Business Administration German-Chinese	Germany Zwickau	Public university of applied sciences
University of Geneva	M.A. Études Chinoises M.A. Master Pluridisciplinaire en Études Asiatiques	Switzerland Geneva	Public university
University of Zurich	M.A. Modern Asian and Middle Eastern Studies (Chinese Studies track)	Switzerland Zurich	Public university
University of Vienna	M.A. Sinophone Societies and Cultures M.A. East Asian Economy and Society	Austria Vienna	Public university
University of Lille	M.A. Langues et Sociétés: Etudes Chinoises	France Lille	Public university
Institut national des langues et civilisations orientales	M.A. Langues, Littératures et Civilisations Étrangères et Régionales: Études Chinoises	France Paris	Public university
Bordeaux Montaigne University	M.A. Langues, Littératures et Civilisations Étrangères et Régionales: Études Chinoises	France Bordeaux	Public university
University of Montpellier Paul Valéry	M.A. Langues, Littératures et Civilisations Étrangères et Régionales: Études Chinoises	France Montpellier	Public university
Paris Cité University	M.A. Langues, Littératures et Civilisations Étrangères et Régionales: Études Chinoises	France Paris	Public university
Rennes 2 University	M.A. Langues, Littératures et Civilisations Étrangères et Régionales: Études Chinoises	France Rennes	Public university
Jean Moulin University Lyon 3	M.A. Langues, Littératures et Civilisations Étrangères et Régionales: Études Chinoises	France Lyon	Public university
KU Leuven	M.A. Master in de Taal- en Regiostudies: Chinese Studies	Belgium Leuven	Public university
University of Liège	M.A. Master en Langues et Littératures Modernes: Professional Focus in Oriental Studies (China/Japan)	Belgium Liège	Public university
Ghent University	M.A. Oriental Languages and Cultures (China)	Belgium Ghent	Public university
Eötvös Loránd University	M.A. Chinese Studies	Hungary Budapest	Public university
Leiden University	M.A. Chinese Studies M.A. Asian Studies	Netherlands Leiden	Public university
University of Groningen	M.A. East Asian Studies/International Relations	Netherlands Groningen	Public university
Uppsala University	M.A. Språk – Kinesiska	Sweden Uppsala	Public university
Lund University	M.Sc. Asian Studies	Sweden Lund	Public university
Stockholm University	M.A. Asian Studies	Sweden Stockholm	Public university
University of Oslo	M.A. Asian and Middle Eastern Studies: Chinese Culture and Society (until 2019: Chinese Society and Politics)	Norway Oslo	Public university
University of Bergen	M.A. Chinese Studies	Norway Bergen	Public university
University of Helsinki	M.A. Kielten: Itä-Aasian Kielet M.A. Alue- ja Kulttuurintutkimuksen	Finland Helsinki	Public university
University of Turku	M.A. East Asian Studies	Finland Turku	Public university
Aalborg University	M.A. Chinese Area Studies	Denmark Aalborg	Public university
Aarhus University	M.A. Globale Områdestudier (Kinastudier)	Denmark Aarhus	Public university
University of Copenhagen	M.A. Asian Studies	Denmark Copenhagen	Public university
University of Warsaw	M.A. Orientalistyka: Snologia	Poland Warsaw	Public university
Comenius University	M.A. Východoázijské Jazyky a Kultúry	Slovakia Bratislava	Public university
Masaryk University	M.A. Čínská Studia	Czech Republic Brno	Public university
Charles University	M.A. Chinese Studies	Czech Republic Prague	Public university
Palacký University Olomouc	M.A. Asijská Studia M.A. Asijská Studia se Specializací Čínský Jazyk a Kultura	Czech Republic Olomouc	Public university
Metropolitain University Prague	M.A. Asijská Studia M.A. Regional Studies and International Business M.A. Regionální Studia a Mezinárodní Obchod	Czech Republic Prague	Private university
University of Latvia	M.A. Āzijas Studijas	Latvia Riga	Public university
Vytautas Magnus University	M.A. East Asia Region Studies (Online)	Lithuania Kaunas	Public university
University of Ljubljana	M.A. Azijske Študije	Slovenia Ljubljana	Public university
Pompeu Fabra University	M.A. Traducción entre Lenguas Globales: Chino-Español	Spain Barcelona	Public university
Autonomous University of Barcelona	M.A. Estudios de Asia-Pacífico en un Contexto Global	Spain Barcelona	Public university
University of Granada	M.A. Estudios de Asia Oriental	Spain Granada	Public university
University of Aveiro, ISCTE - University Institute of Lisbon	M.A. Estudos Chineses	Portugal Aveiro, Lisbon	Public polytechnic university, Public university
University of Minho	M.A. Estudos Interculturais Português/Chinês	Portugal Minho	Public university
Catholic University of Portugal	M.A. Asian Studies	Portugal Lisbon	Private university
University of Naples "L'Orientale"	M.A. Lingue e Culture dell’Asia e dell’Africa M.A. Relazioni e Istituzioni dell’Asia e dell’Africa M.A. Didattica della Lingua Cinese M.A. Global Management for China	Italy Naples	Public university
Luiss University, Renmin University	M.A. Global Management and Chinese Politics	Italy Rome, China Beijing	Private university, Public university
Ca' Foscari University of Venice	M.A. Language and Management to China	Italy Venice	Public university
Sofia University, Beijing Foreign Studies University	M.P. Междукултурна комуникация и превод с китайски и български език	Bulgaria Sofia, China Beijing	Public university, Public university
University of Patras, Southwest University, University of Athens, University of Thessaloniki, University of Crete	M.A. Greek and Chinese Civilizations: a Comperative Approach	Greece Patras, China Chongqing	Public university, Public university
Boğaziçi University	M.A. Asya Çalışmaları	Turkey Istanbul	Public university
Erciyes University	M..A. Chinese Language and Literature	Turkey Kayseri	Public university
Social Sciences University of Ankara	M.A. Asian Studies M.A. Asya Çalışmaları	Turkey Ankara	Public university
Belarusian State University	Master in Linguodidactics, Profilization: Chinese Language Training	Belarus Minsk	Public university
Higher School of Economics	Китайский язык в межкультурной бизнес-коммуникации	Russia Moscow	Public university
St. Petersburg State University	Master in Russia and China in International Finance and Trade Master in Contemporary China: Economics, Politics, Society	Russia St. Petersburg	Public university
Lomonosov Moscow State University	Master in Foreign Literature in the Aspect of Dialogue of Cultures Master in Translation and Cross-Cultural Communication Master in Language Sciences and Cultural Studies for Special Needs Master in Digital Foreign Language Education Master in Teaching Languages of the East Asian Countries Master in Developmental Education via Foreign Language	Russia Moscow	Public university
Lomonosov Moscow State University	Культура и общество стран Азии и Африки Политическое развитие и международные отношения стран Азии и Африки Экономика и международные экономические отношения стран Азии и Африки Политика и бизнес в Азии и России M.Sc. Politics and Business in Asia and Russia	Russia Moscow	Public university
Moscow State University Beijing Institute of Technology	M.Sc. Modern Eurasian Development	Russia Moscow, China Shenzhen	Public university, Public university
University of Bath	M.A. Interpreting and Translating, Chinese track	United Kingdom England Bath	Public university
University of Birmingham	M.A. English-Chinese Interpreting with Translating	United Kingdom England Birmingham	Public university
University of Bristol	M.A. Chinese-English Translation	United Kingdom England Bristol	Public university
University of Cambridge	M.Phil. Asian and Middle Eastern Studies (Chinese Studies) (Research) M.Phil. Asian and Middle Eastern Studies (Chinese Studies) (Taught)	United Kingdom England Cambridge	Public university
Durham University	M.A. Languages, Literatures and Cultures M.A. Translation Studies M.A./M.Phil.Chinese Studies (Research)	United Kingdom England Durham	Public university
University of Edinburgh	M.A. Chinese (Hons) M.A. Chinese and Russian Studies (Hons) M.Sc. Chinese (Research) M.Sc. Modern Chinese Cultural Studies M.A. Chinese Studies M.Sc. Translation Studies	United Kingdom Scotland Edinburgh	Public university
University of Exeter	M.A. Global Literatures and Cultures M.A. Translation Studies M.A. Modern Languages (Research) M.Phil. Chinese Studies (Research)	United Kingdom England Exeter	Public university
University of Glasgow	M.Phil. Chinese Studies (Research)	United Kingdom Scotland Glasgow	Public university
Heriot-Watt University	M.Sc. Chinese-English Interpreting and Translating M.Sc. Chinese-English Translating M.Sc. Interpreting (Chinese pathway) M.Sc. Translating (Chinese pathway) M.Sc. Interpreting and Translating (Chinese pathway)	United Kingdom Scotland Edinburgh	Public university
King's College London	M.Sc. China & Globalisation	United Kingdom England London	Public university
Lancester University	M.A. Languages and Cultures (Research) M.A. Global Medical and Health Humanities M.A. Sustainability and Global Environmental Futures	United Kingdom England Lancester	Public university
University of Leeds	M.A. Conference Interpreting and Translation M.A. Applied Translation Studies	United Kingdom England Leeds	Public university
University of Leicester	M.A. Translation (Chinese Pathway)	United Kingdom England Leicester	Public university
University of Liverpool	M.A. Chinese-English Translation and Interpreting M.Res. Modern Languages and Cultures	United Kingdom England Liverpool	Public university
London School of Economics (University of London)	M.Sc. China in Comparative Perspective	United Kingdom England London	Public university
London School of Economics (University of London), Peking University	M.Sc. International Affairs	United Kingdom England London, China Beijing	Public university, Public university
University of Manchester	M.A. Intercultural Communication M.A. Translation and Interpreting Studies M.A. Modern Languages and Cultures	United Kingdom England Manchester	Public university
Newcastle University	M.Litt. Chinese Studies	United Kingdom England Newcastle upon Tyne	Public university
University of Nottingham	M.A. Global Film M.A. Translation and Interpreting M.A. Interpreting and Conference Diplomacy M.A. Conference Interpreting M.A. Translation and Localisation M.A. Translation Studies M.Litt. Chinese Studies M.Litt. Translation Studies M.Litt. Interpreting Studies	United Kingdom England Nottingham	Public university
University of Oxford	M.Sc. Contemporary Chinese Studies M.Phil. Modern Chinese Studies M.St. Traditional China	United Kingdom England Oxford	Public university
University of Portsmouth	M.A. Translation Studies	United Kingdom England Portsmouth	Public university
Queen's University Belfast	M.A. Translation M.A. Interpreting	United Kingdom Northern Ireland Belfast	Public university
SOAS (University of London)	M.A. Chinese Studies M.A. Chinese Studies and Intensive Language M.A. History of Art and Archeology of East Asia M.A. History of Art and Archeology of East Asia and Intensive Language M.A. Translation and Intercultural Studies M.A. Taiwan Studies M.A. Buddhist Studies M.Phil. in Translation Studies M.Phil. Chinese and Inner Asian Studies M.Sc. Politics and International Relations (East Asia)	United Kingdom England London	Public university
SOAS (University of London), Nazarbayev University	M.A. Global Affairs and Eurasian Studies	United Kingdom England London, Kazakhstan Astana	Public university, Public university
University of Sheffield	M.Sc. East Asian Business M.A. Politics and Media in East Asia M.A. Translation and Intercultural Studies	United Kingdom England Sheffield	Public university
University of Surrey	M.A. Translation and AI (Chinese Pathway) M.A. Interpreting, Technology and AI (Chinese Pathway)	United Kingdom England Surrey	Public university
University of Wales Trinity Saint David	M.A. Chinese Buddhist Textual Studies M.A. Confucian Classical Studies	United Kingdom Wales Lampeter	Public university
University of Warwick	M.A. Translation and Cultures	United Kingdom England Coventry	Public university
Trinity College Dublin	M.Phil. Chinese Studies	Ireland Dublin	Public university
Maynooth University	M.A. Chinese Studies	Ireland Maynooth	Public university
University College Cork	M.A. Asian Studies M.A. Teaching Chinese to Speakers of Other Languages	Ireland Cork	Public university
University College Dublin	M.A. Teaching Chinese Language and Culture	Ireland Dublin	Public university

=== North American universities ===
University	Master programmes	Location	Type
Arizona State University	M.A. Asian Languages and CIvilizations (Chinese)	United States Arizona Tempe	Public university
University of Arizona	M.A. China Area Studies	United States Arizona Tucson	Public university
California State University, Long Beach	M.A. Asian Studies	United States California Long Beach	Public university
California State University, Northridge	M.A. Asian Studies Interdisciplinary Program	United States California Northridge	Public university
Stanford University	M.A. Chinese Literature and Culture M.A. Chinese Linguistics M.A. Chinese Archaeology M.A. Trans-Asian Studies	United States California Stanford	Private university
University of California, Berkeley	M.A. Asian Studies	United States California Berkeley	Public university
University of California, Los Angeles	M.A. East Asian Studies	United States California Los Angeles	Public university
University of Southern California	M.A. East Asian Area Studies	United States California Los Angeles	Private university
University of California, Santa Barbara	M.A. East Asian Languages & Cultural Studies	United States California Santa Barbara	Public university
University of California, Irvine	M.A. East Asian Studies	United States California Irvine	Public university
University of California, San Diego	M.A. Chinese Economic and Political Affairs	United States California San Diego	Public university
University of Colorado Boulder	M.A. Asian Languages and Civilizations (Chinese)	United States Colorado Boulder	Public university
Yale University	M.A. East Asian Studies	United States Connecticut New Haven	Private university
Central Connecticut State University	M.Sc. International Studies, Specialization East Asian Studies	United States Connecticut New Britain	Public university
University of Delaware	M.A. Languages, Literatures, CUltures and Pedagogy, Concentration Chinese Studies	United States Delaware Newark	Privately governed, state-assisted
Florida International University	M.A. Asian Studies	United States Florida Westchester	Public university
Florida State University	M.A. East Asian Languages and Cultures M.A. Asian Studies M.Sc. Asian Studies	United States Florida Tallahassee	Public university
University of Hawaiʻi at Mānoa	M.A. Asian Studies M.A. East Asian Languages and Literatures	United States Hawaii Mānoa	Public university
University of Chicago	M.A. Humanities (East Asian Languages and Civilizations)	United States Illinois Chicago	Private university
Northwestern University	M.A. Asian American Studies M.A. Asian Languages and Cultures	United States Illinois Evanston	Private university
University of Illinois	M.A. East Asian Languages and Cultures	United States Illinois Urbana-Champaign	Public university
Indiana University Bloomington	M.A. East Asian Languages and Cultures M.A. International and Regional Studies	United States Indiana Bloomington	Public university
University of Kansas	M.A. East Asian Languages and Cultures	United States Kansas Lawrence	Public university
University of Maryland, College Park	M.A. East Asian Languages and Cultures	United States Maryland College Park	Public university
Brandeis University	M.A Chinese	United States Massachusetts Waltham	Private university
Harvard University	M.A. Regional Studies - East Asia	United States Massachusetts Cambridge	Private university
University of Massachusetts Amherst	M.A. Chinese	United States Massachusetts Amherst	Public university
University of Michigan	M.A. International and Regional Studies, Chinese studies Specialization M.A. Transcultural Studies	United States Michigan Ann Arbor	Public university
University of Minnesota	M.A. Asian and Middle Eastern Studies	United States Minnesota Minneapolis	Public university
Washington University in St. Louis	M.A. Chinese M.A. East Asian Studies	United States Missouri St. Louis	Private university
Rutgers University	M.A. East Asian Languages and Cultures	United States New Jersey New Brunswick	Public university
Seton Hall University	M.A. Asian Studies (as of 2026 no admissions)	United States New Jersey South Orange	Ecclesiastical university
Binghamton University	M.A. Asian and Asian American Studies	United States New York Vestal	Public university
Columbia University	M.A. East Asian Languages and Cultures LLM Chinese Legal Studies	United States New York New York City	Private university
Cornell University	M.A. Asian Studies	United States New York Ithaca	Private university
Hunter College	M.A. Adolescent Education Chinese M.A. Translation and Interpreting	United States New York New York City	Public university
New York University	M.A. East Asian Studies	United States New York New York City	Private university
Stony Brook University	M.A. Contemporary Asian and Asian American Studies	United States New York New York City	Public university
Duke University	M.A. Critical Asian and Middle Eastern Humanities M.A. East Asian Studies	United States North Carolina Durham	Private university
University of North Carolina at Chapel Hill	M.A. Asian and Middle Eastern Studies	United States North Carolina Chapel Hill	Public university
Ohio University	M.A. Asian Studies	United States Ohio Athens	Public university
Ohio State University	M.A. East Asian Languages and Literatures M.A. East Asian Studies	United States Ohio Columbus	Public university
University of Oklahoma	M.A. International Studies, Concentration East Asian Studies	United States Oklahoma Norman	Public university
University of Oregon	M.A. Asian Studies M.A. East Asian Languages and Literatures	United States Oregon Eugene	Public university
University of Pennsylvania	M.A. in East Asian Languages and Civilizations	United States Pennsylvania Philadelphia	Private university
University of Pittsburgh	M.A. East Asian Studies (Interdisciplinary Master of Arts)	United States Pennsylvania Pittsburgh	Public university
University of Houston	M.A. World Cultures and Literatures	United States Texas Houston	Public university
University of Texas at Austin	M.A. Asian Cultures and Languages	United States Texas Austin	Public university
University of Utah	M.A. Asian Studies	United States Utah Salt Lake City	Public university
Middlebury College	M.A. Chinese	United States Vermont Middlebury	Private university
George Mason University	M.A. Foreign Languages	United States Virginia Fairfax	Public university
University of Virginia	M.A. East Asian Studies	United States Virginia Charlottesville	Public university
University of Washington	M.A. Asian Languages and Literature (Chinese track) M.A. International Studies (China Studies concentration)	United States Washington Seattle	Public university
Georgetown University	M.A. Asian Studies	United States Washington, D.C.	Ecclesiastical university
George Washington University	M.A. Chinese Language and Culture	United States Washington, D.C.	Private university
University of Wisconsin-Madison	M.A. Asian Languages and Cultures	United States Wisconsin Madison	Public university
University of Toronto	M.A. East Asian Studies M.A. History with focus on China	Canada Toronto	Public university
University of British Columbia	M.A. Asian Studies	Canada Vancouver	Public university
University of Alberta	M.A. Chinese Literature M.A. East Asian Studies	Canada Edmonton	Public university
University of Victoria	M.A. Pacific and Asian Studies	Canada Victoria	Public university
McGill University	M.A. East Asian Studies	Canada Montreal	Public university

=== Australian and Oceanian universities ===
University	Master programmes	Location	Type
Australian National University	Master of Asian and Pacific Studies	Australia Australian Capital Territory Canberra	Public university
University of New England	M.A. Chinese M.A.T. Chinese M.Phil. Chinese (Research)	Australia New South Wales Armidale	Public university
University of Sydney	M.A. Chinese Studies (Research) M.Phil. Chinese Studies (Research)	Australia New South Wales Armidale	Public university
La Trobe University	M.A. Chinese Studies (Research) M.Phil. Chinese Studies (Research)	Australia Victoria Melbourne	Public university
University of Melbourne	Master of Contemporary Chinese Studies	Australia Victoria Melbourne	Public university
Monash University Shanghai Jiao Tong University	Master of International Relations	Australia Victoria Melbourne, China Shanghai	Public university Public university
Royal Melbourne Institute of Technology	Master of Translating and Interpreting Master of Global Studies	Australia Victoria Melbourne	Public university
Deakin University	M.A. Chinese (Research)	Australia Victoria Melbourne	Public university
University of Queensland	M.A. Translation and Interpreting	Australia Queensland Brisbane	Public university
Murdoch University	Master of Translation Studies	Australia Western Australia Perth	Public university
University of Auckland	M.A. Chinese M.A. Asian Studies	New Zealand Auckland	Public university
Victoria University of Wellington	M.A. Chinese M.A. Asian Studies M.A. Literary Translation Studies	New Zealand Wellington	Public university
University of Canterbury	Master of Applied Translation and Interpreting M.A. Chinese	New Zealand Christchurch	Public university

== Journals ==
- Bulletin de l'École française d'Extrême Orient
- Chinese Heritage Quarterly, China Heritage Project, Australian National University
- Euro-Sinica
- Harvard Journal of Asiatic Studies
- Journal of Asian Studies
- Journal of the European Association for Chinese Studies
- The China Quarterly
- Journal Asiatique
- Late Imperial China
- Monumenta Serica
- Sino-Platonic Papers
- T'oung Pao
- Modern China
- Toho Gakuho
- Toyoshi Kenkyu
- Tang Studies
- Chinese Literature: Essays, Articles, Reviews
- Journal of Chinese Literature and Culture
- Asia Major

== See also ==
- Outline of sinology
