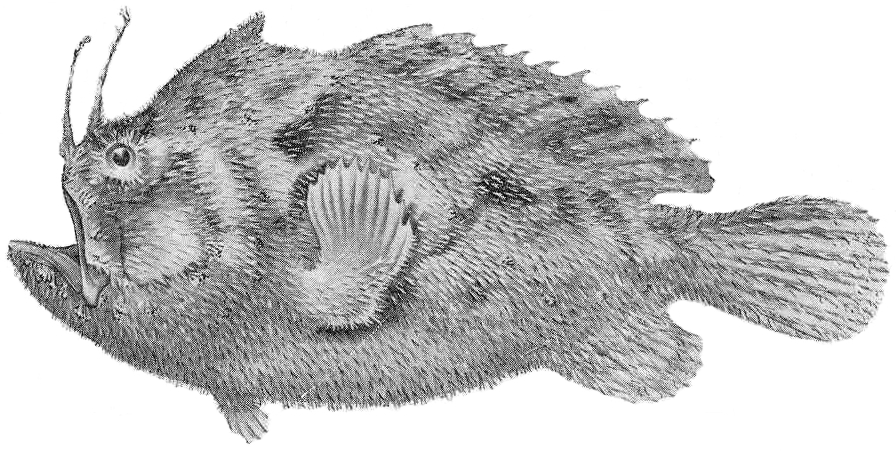

Scientific classification
- Kingdom: Animalia
- Phylum: Chordata
- Class: Actinopterygii
- Order: Lophiiformes
- Family: Antennariidae
- Genus: Echinophryne
- Species: E. mitchellii

Binomial name
- Echinophryne mitchellii (Morton, 1897)

Synonyms
- Antennarius mitchellii Morton, 1897; Echinophryne mitchelli (Morton, 1897); Trichophryne mitchelli (Morton, 1897)

= Echinophryne mitchellii =

Species of fish

Echinophryne mitchellii, the long-spined frogfish, bristly frogfish, Mitchell's anglerfish, Mitchell's frogfish, prickly angler fish or spinycoat anglerfish, is a species of marine ray-finned fish belonging to the subfamily Histiophryninae in the family Antennariidae, the frogfishes. These fishes are endemic to the temperate waters of southern Australia.

== Taxonomy ==
Echinophryne mitchellii was first formally described as Antennarius mitchellii in 1897 by the American-born Australian naturalist Alexander Morton with its type locality given as Lisdillon in eastern Tasmania. Although the description was published under Morton's name it is possible it was actually written by James Douglas Ogilby. Some authorities classify Echinophryne in the subfamily Histiophryninae within the family Antennariidae., while others recognise it as the family Histiophrynidae. However, the 5th edition of Fishes of the World does not recognise subfamilies within the Antennariidae, classifying the family within the suborder Antennarioidei within the order Lophiiformes, the anglerfishes.

== Etymology ==
Echinophryne mitchellii has the genus name Echinophryne which combines echinos, meaning "spiny", a reference to the skin of the type species which was described as "thickly beset with large, upstanding, bifurcate spinules", with phryne, meaning "toad", a common used suffix for anglerfish genera, it may date as far back as Aristotle and Cicero, who referred to anglerfishes as "fishing-frogs" and "sea-frogs", respectively, this is assumed to be an allusion to the frog- or toad-like appearance of these fishes. The identity of the person honoured in the specific name is not known but it is possibly the Scottish-born Australian schoolteacher and paleontologist John Mitchell who was an associate of Robert Etheridge, Junior, Ogilby's superior at the Australian Museum.

== Description ==
Echinophryne mitchellii has a short, moderately compressed, deep body with a short caudal peduncle and a large head. The eyes are small and the upturned mouth is large, filled with many small recurved teeth. The small gill opening is to the rear and below the base of the pectoral fin. There are no scales and the body has a dense covering of bifurcate spinules, the length of the spines on each spinule is three to four times distance between the points of the spines. There is a ring around the eye made up of spinules in tight clusters. There are three dorsal spines, the first is the illicium and this is located on the tip of the snout and does not have an obvious lure, or esca, being tipped with a cluster of spinules and sometime cutaneous appendages. The second dorsal spine is almost the same length as the illicium, is positioned above the eye, is not connected to the skin on the head by a membrane and is also tipped with clusters of spinules and cutaneous appendages. The small third spine is connected to the skin on the nape by a membrane. The dorsal fin is supported by 13 or 14 soft rays while the anal fin 8 or 9 soft rays, these fins do not reach the caudal peduncle. The pectoral fins are arm-like and the caudal fin is rounded. The overall colour is beige, light pinkish-brown, yellow to yellowish-brown, the upper part of the head and body is typically slightly darker than the lower head and body. There are irregular, dark-brown to black mottles, particularly on the face and upper surface of the head. The face, the upper surface of the head, including the dorsal spines and dorsal fin greyish may be greyish. This species has a maximum published standard length of 11.1 cm (4.4 in).

== Distribution and habitat ==
Echinophryne mitchellii is endemic to the temperate waters of southeastern Australia being found along the south coast of Australia between Wilsons Promontory in Victoria (state) west to Streaky Bay in South Australia. It also occurs around Flinders Island, and the eastern coast of Tasmania as far south as Bruny Island. This is a demersal fish which inhabits inshore reefs at depths between 5 and 70 m (16 and 230 ft).
