= University of Washington Press =

American academic publishing house

- Parent company: University of Washington
- Status: Active
- Founded: 1915
- Country of origin: United States
- Headquarters location: Seattle
- Distribution: Hopkins Fulfillment Services (US); UBC Press (Canada); Combined Academic Publishers (rest of world)
- Key people: Nicole Mitchell, Director; Lorri Hagman, Editor
- Publication types: Books
- Nonfiction topics: History and culture
- Fiction genres: Nonfiction
- Official website: uwapress.uw.edu

The University of Washington Press is an American academic publishing house. The organization is a division of the University of Washington, based in Seattle. Although the division functions autonomously, it has worked to assist the university's efforts in support of the Burke Museum of Natural History and Culture, the Henry M. Jackson School of International Studies, and the Center for Innovation and Research in Graduate Education. Since 1915, it has published the works of first-time writers, including students, poets, and artists, along with authors known throughout the world for their work in the humanities, arts, and sciences.

The organization's daily operations are conducted out independently of the university, but the imprint is controlled by a committee of faculty members that the university president has selected. Each manuscript must go through a collaborative approval process overseen by the editors and the University Press Committee before being chosen for publication under the University of Washington Press imprint. Once a selection has been approved for publication, the organization begins the production process, which includes typesetting and copy editing, along with cover design and promotions. Rather than printing in-house, all composition, printing, and binding services are contracted through external facilities.

Approximately a third of the manuscripts published originate from within the university. The publishing house receives over 1,000 manuscripts and book proposals each year from throughout the world, with about seven percent approved for publication. Published titles include nonfiction works of history and culture, focusing on a variety of academic fields including Asian studies, Asian American studies, Middle Eastern studies, Western history, natural history, environmental studies, anthropology, biography, and fine art. As of 2013, over 4,400 books have been published, with over 1,400 remaining in print. Approximately 70 books are released on an annual basis. Among the books published by the press are works by Nobel Prize laureates, including Tsung-Dao Lee.

== Background ==
The University of Washington Press was established in 1915, as a division of the University of Washington. The publishing house is a nonprofit corporation whose primary function focuses on advancing cultural understanding through the research, development, and publication of academic work, considered to be of historical value. The first book published was Governors of Washington, Territorial and State, written by Edmond Meany. The first book published under the University of Washington Press imprint was a 1920 edition of The Poems of Henry Howard, Earl of Surrey edited by Frederick M. Padelford.

The organization is the largest Pacific Northwest-based scholarly publisher. Their initial focus and geographical scope encompassed Northern California to the northernmost point of the state of Alaska and from the Continental Divide to the Pacific Ocean. In the 1960s, they began publishing works on Asian culture and history. In 1969, they established the Asian Law Series, which served to assist the Asian Law Center at the university. In the early 2000s, they increased their expansion efforts beyond the Pacific Northwest to include the Pacific Rim and Asia and embarked on publishing historical and cultural series through formal affiliations with facilities and departments of the University of Washington, as well as editors from prominent educational institutions from around the world. As of 2013, over 20 volumes have been published, including the 2005 translation of Da Ming lü (translated: The Great Ming Code); 2007's Writing and Law in Late Imperial China: Crime, Conflict, and Judgment; and Law in Japan: A Turning Point, published in 2008.

The Korean Studies of the Henry M. Jackson School of International Studies series was established in 1988. As of 2013, eight monographs have been published, including Marginality and Subversion in Korea: The Hong Kyangmae Rebellion of 1812, written by Sun Joo Kim. In 1994, they published the Studies on Ethnic Groups in China series, which focused on the examination of individual ethnicities, as well as relationships between various peoples in China, Hong Kong, and Taiwan. As of 2013, over ten volumes have been published in this series, including Thomas Heberer's Doing Business in China: Liangshan's New Ethnic Entrepreneurs, published in 2007.

In 1999, the University of Washington Press published Ancient Buddhist Scrolls from Gandhāra: The British Library Kharosthī Fragments, written by Richard Salomon, who teaches Asian languages and literature at the university. As of 2013, he continues to oversee the Early Buddhist Manuscripts Project, which encompasses research and analysis of ancient birch bark scrolls, which were discovered in the Gandhāra region of western Pakistan. Preserved in clay jars and buried in ancient monasteries, analysis is being done to determine if the scrolls are the oldest surviving Buddhist texts ever discovered. Known as Wiigwaasabak, the scrolls have been attributed to the Dharmaguptaka sect. Since the initial publication, the press has released five volumes in the Gandhāran Buddhist texts series.

The Critical Dialogues in Southeast Asian Studies series was established in 2004. The series is edited by members of the university's history and anthropology faculty. Works are published which focus on historiography; critical ethnography; colonialism, nationalism, and ethnicity; gender equality and sexuality; science and technology; political science and sociology; and the arts encompassing literature, drama, and film. As of 2013, the press has publishes six volumes, including Love, Passion, and Patriotism: Sexuality and the Philippine Propaganda Movement, written in 2008, by Raquel A.G. Reyes.

== Partnerships ==
The organization has professional publishing partnerships with museums and university presses throughout the world, including Canada, China, and Australia. They also work collaboratively with publishing houses in the People's Republic of China and Russia. These partnerships allow them to distribute publications on a global scale, with several works having been translated into over ten languages. The organization fosters relationships with other university publishers, through their membership with the Association of University Presses, which they joined in 1947. Along with the Association, they have hosted publishing conferences and participated in regional and national programs on an annual basis. Since the division was established, they have continued to cultivate and develop relationships with regional, national, and global partners, which include the following organizations.

- Canadian Museum of Civilization
- Fowler Museum at UCLA
- International Sculpture Center
- Museum for African Art
- National Gallery of Australia
- University of British Columbia Press
- UCLA Chicano Studies Research Center Press

== Honors and awards ==
2012

- National Outdoor Book Award, winner (Design and Artist Merit Category) – Beneath Cold Seas: The Underwater Wilderness of the Pacific Northwest by David J. Hall
- Association of American University Presses Jacket and Cover Design Award, winner (Tom Eykemans, designer) – Darwin's Pharmacy: Sex, Plants, and the Evolution of the Noosphere by Richard Doyle
- American Book Award, winner – Qayluyaarmiuni Nunamtenek Qanemciput/Our Nelson Island Stories: Meanings of Place on the Bering Sea Coast, Alice Rearden (translator); Ann Fienup-Riordan (editor)
- American Society for Environmental History George Perkins Marsh Prize, winner – Quagmire: Nation-Building and Nature in the Mekong Delta by David Biggs
- Association of American University Presses Jacket and Cover Design Award, winner (Tom Eykemans, designer) – Red Autobiographies: Initiating the Bolshevik Self by Igal Halfin
- Association of American University Presses Reference Design Award, winner (Ashley Saleeba, designer) – Seattle Geographies, edited by Michael Brown and Richard Morrill
- Robert G. Athearn Book Award, winner – Shadow Tribe: The Making of Columbia River Indian Identity by Andy Fisher
- Association of American University Presses Poetry and Literature Design Award, winner (Ashley Saleeba, designer) – Underdog: Poems by Katrina Roberts
- Herskovits Prize, winner – Vigilant Things: On Thieves, Yoruba Anti-Aesthetics, and the Strange Fates of Ordinary Objects in Nigeria by David Doris
- John Lyman Book Award, winner – Voyages: To the New World and Beyond by Gordon Miller

2013

- Pacific Northwest Historians Guild Organizational Award, winner – University of Washington Press

== Notable authors ==
- Kathleen Flenniken
- Thomas Heberer
- Tsung-Dao Lee

== See also ==
- List of English-language book publishing companies
- List of university presses
