= Histiophryne pogonia =

Scientific classification
- Domain: Eukaryota
- Kingdom: Animalia
- Phylum: Chordata
- Class: Actinopterygii
- Order: Lophiiformes
- Family: Antennariidae
- Genus: Histiophryne
- Species: H. pogonia

Binomial name
- Histiophryne pogonia Arnold, 2012

Species of fish

Histiophryne pogonia is a species of fish in the family Antennariidae. It is native to the Pacific Ocean, where it is known from Indonesia and the Philippines, specifically the shallow inshore waters of Lombok, Komodo, and possibly Cebu. It is a reef-dwelling species that is thought to be more active at night. Males of the species reach 4.8 cm (1.9 inches) SL, whereas females are slightly larger at up to 5.4 cm (2.1 inches) SL. Two specimens of H. pogonia were observed to live peacefully in an aquarium for multiple months, which suggests that this species (and possibly the genus Histiophryne as a whole) may be less aggressive and less cannibalistic than members of genera such as Antennarius or Histrio. This species can be distinguished from its congeners by its extremely small illicium, although it does have a distinct esca unlike members of the genus Echinophryne. While it was initially described as H. pogonius, FishBase and WoRMS list it as H. pogonia, with FishBase marking H. pogonius as a misspelling.
