= Thomas Heberer =

Thomas Heberer may refer to:

- Thomas Heberer (sinologist) (born 1947), German sinologist and political scientist
- Thomas Heberer (musician) (born 1965), German trumpeter
