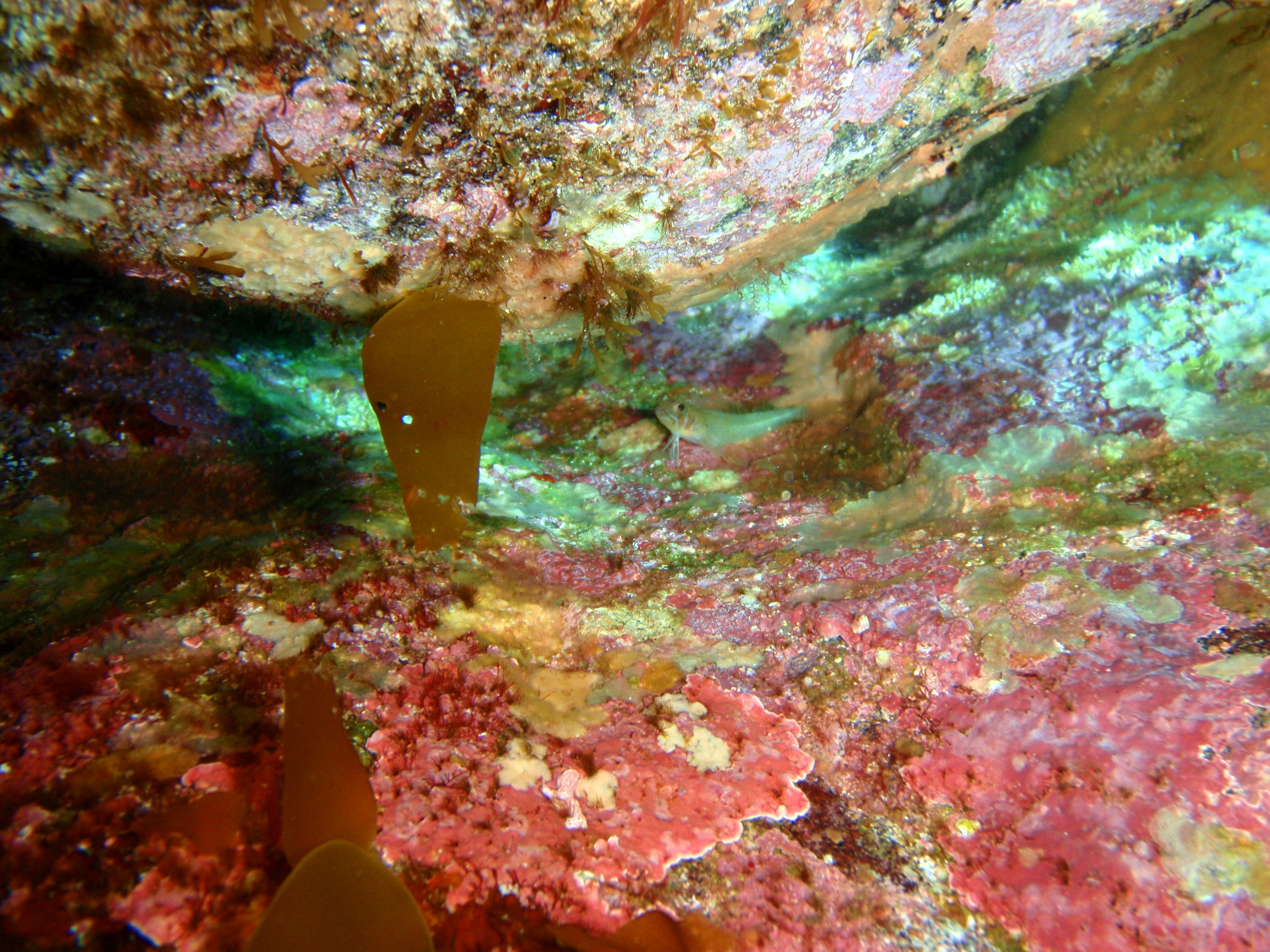
- Clarke's triplefin Trinorfolkia clarkei

Scientific classification
- Kingdom: Animalia
- Phylum: Chordata
- Class: Actinopterygii
- Order: Blenniiformes
- Family: Tripterygiidae
- Subfamily: Tripterygiinae
- Genus: Trinorfolkia; Fricke, 1994

Type species
- Triptergium clarkei Morton, 1888

Species
- See text.

= Trinorfolkia =

Genus of fishes

Trinorfolkia is a genus of triplefins in the family Tripterygiidae.

== Species ==
- Clarke's triplefin, Trinorfolkia clarkei (Morton, 1888)
- Crested triplefin, Trinorfolkia cristata (Kuiter, 1986)
- Notched triplefin, Trinorfolkia incisa (Kuiter, 1986)
