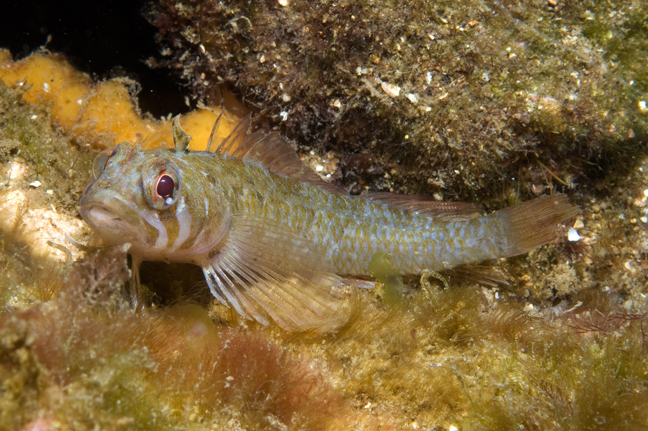

Conservation status
- Least Concern (IUCN 3.1)

Scientific classification
- Kingdom: Animalia
- Phylum: Chordata
- Class: Actinopterygii
- Order: Blenniiformes
- Family: Tripterygiidae
- Genus: Trinorfolkia
- Species: T. clarkei

Binomial name
- Trinorfolkia clarkei (Morton, 1888)

Synonyms
- Gillias clarkei (Morton, 1888); Helcogramma clarkei (Morton, 1888); Norfolkia clarkei (Morton, 1888); Tripterygion clarkii (Morton, 1888); Tripterygium clarkei Morton, 1888; Tripterygium striaticeps Ramsay & Ogilby, 188; Norfolkia striaticeps (Ramsay & Ogilby, 1888); Tripterygion striaticeps (Ramsay & Ogilby, 1888); Tripterygium macleayanum Lucas, 1891

= Clarke's triplefin =

Species of fish

The Clarke's triplefin or Clarke's threefin (Trinorfolkia clarkei) is a species of triplefin blenny in the genus Trinorfolkia. It was described by Alexander Morton in 1888 from specimens collected from Clarke Island in the Bass Strait. This species occurs I southern and western Australia from Camden Haven in New South Wales to Rottnest Island in Western Australia and around Tasmania. It occurs on coastal reefs and in estuaries frequently being observed around the pylons supporting structures such as jetties.
