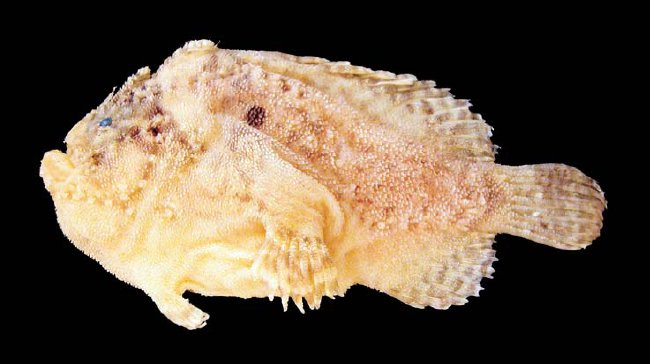
- Lophiocharon hutchinsi
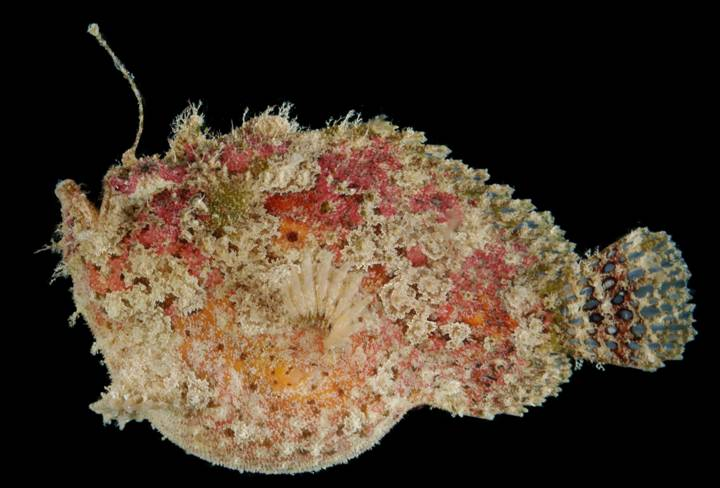
- Lophiocharon lithinostomus

Scientific classification
- Kingdom: Animalia
- Phylum: Chordata
- Class: Actinopterygii
- Order: Lophiiformes
- Family: Antennariidae
- Subfamily: Lophichthyinae
- Genus: Lophiocharon; Whitley, 1933

Type species
- Lophiocharon broomensis Whitley, 1933

= Lophiocharon =

Genus of fishes

Lophiocharon is a genus of marine ray-finned fishes belonging to the subfamily Histiophryninae in the family Antennariidae, the frogfishes. These fishes are found in the eastern Indian Ocean and Western Pacific Ocean.

== Taxonomy ==
Lophiocharon was first proposed as a monospecific genus in 1933 by the Australian ichthyologist Gilbert Percy Whitley when he described Lophiocharon broomensis, which he designated as the type species of the new genus. L. broomensis was given the type locality of Broome, Western Australia. L. broomensis was later considered to be a synonym of Chironectes trisignatus which had been described in 1844 by Sir John Richardson, also from Broome. Some authorities classify this genus in the subfamily Histiophryninae within the family Antennariidae, while others recognise it as the family Histiophrynidae. However, the 5th edition of Fishes of the World does not recognise subfamilies within the Antennariidae, classifying the family within the suborder Antennarioidei within the order Lophiiformes, the anglerfishes.

== Etymology ==
Lophiocharon has no explained etymology. It is thought to be a combination of Lophius, the type genus of the order Lophiiformes, and may be being used as a general term for anglerfishes, with Charon, the ferryman who ferried the dead across the Styx.

== Species ==
There are currently three recognized species in this genus:

- Lophiocharon hutchinsi Pietsch, 2004 (Hutchins' anglerfish)
- Lophiocharon lithinostomus D. S. Jordan & R. E. Richardson, 1908 (Marble-mouthed frogfish)
- Lophiocharon trisignatus J. Richardson, 1844 (Three-spot frogfish)

== Characteristics ==
Lophiocharon anglerfishes have the second and third dorsal spines free of the skin and not hidden underneath it. All of the fin rays in the caudal fin are bifurcate. The skin has a covering of dermal denticles and the third dorsal spine is joined for more than a quarter of its length to the nape by a membrane or is connected to the soft dorsal fin by skin, and is connected to the second spine at its base. The caudal fin is typically marked with translucent ocelli between every second fin ray. The three-spot frogfish is the largest species in the genus with a maximum published standard length of 14.7 cm (5.8 in) while the smallest is Hutchins' anglerfish with a maximum published standard length of 4.9 cm (1.9 in).

== Distribution and habitat ==
Lophiocharon anglerfishes are found in the Indo-Pacific in the eastern Indian Ocean and western Pacific Ocean from Singapore east to the Philippines and south to Australia. These are coastal fishes of shallow waters where they can be found on reefs, on sandy or muddy substrates and among seagrass.
