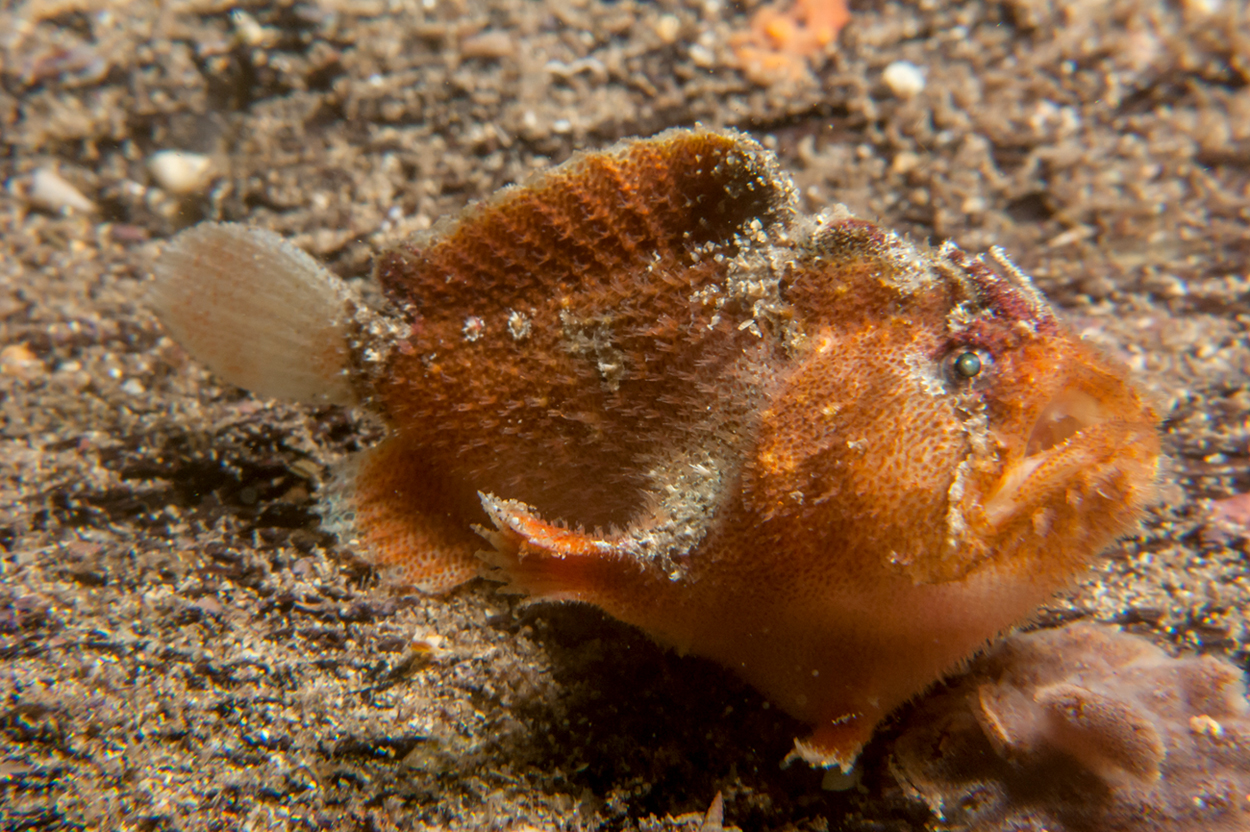
- Echinophryne crassispina

Scientific classification
- Kingdom: Animalia
- Phylum: Chordata
- Class: Actinopterygii
- Order: Lophiiformes
- Family: Antennariidae
- Subfamily: Rhycherinae
- Genus: Echinophryne; McCulloch & Waite, 1918

Type species
- Echinophryne crassispina McCulloch & Waite, 1918

Species
- see text

= Echinophryne =

Genus of fishes

Echinophryne is a genus of marine ray-finned fishes belonging to the subfamily Histiophryninae in the family Antennariidae, the frogfishes. The fishes in this genus are endemic to the waters off Australia.

== Taxonomy ==
Echinophryne was first proposed as a genus in 1918 by the Australian ichthyologists Allan Riverstone McCulloch and Edgar Ravenswood Waite with Echinophryne crassispina, a species being newly described by McCulloch and Waite, being designated as the type species as well as being its only species. Some authorities classify this genus in the subfamily Histiophryninae within the family Antennariidae., while others recognise it as the family Histiophrynidae. However, the 5th edition of Fishes of the World does not recognise subfamilies within the Antennariidae, classifying the family within the suborder Antennarioidei within the order Lophiiformes, the anglerfishes.

== Etymology ==
Echinophryne combines echinos, meaning "spiny", a reference to the skin of the type species which was described as "thickly beset with large, upstanding, bifurcate spinules", with phryne, meaning "toad", a common used suffix for anglerfish genera, it may date as far back as Aristotle and Cicero, who referred to anglerfishes as "fishing-frogs" and "sea-frogs", respectively, this is assumed to be an allusion to the frog- or toad-like appearance of these fishes.

== Species ==
Echinophryne has three recognised species classified within it:

- Echinophryne crassispina McCulloch & Waite, 1918 (Prickly anglerfish)
- Echinophryne mitchellii (Morton, 1897) (Long-spined anglerfish)
- Echinophryne reynoldsi Pietsch & Kuiter, 1984 (Sponge anglerfish)

== Characteristics ==
Echinophryne anglerfishes have the second and third dorsal spines free of the skin and not hidden underneath it. The rough skin is densely covered in denticles. there is a caudal peduncle and the rearmost margins of the dorsal and anal fins are attached to the caudal peduncle in front of the base of the caudal fin. The illicium is covered by closely set denticles and lacks a bulbous lure, or esca. These are relatively small fishes with the largest species being the long-spined anglerfish (E. mitchelli) which has a maximum published standard length of 11.1 cm (4.4 in).

== Distribution and habitat ==
Echinophryne anglerfishes are endemic to Australia, they are found along the southern coasts of Australia from King George Sound (Western Australia) in Western Australia to Jervis Bay in New South Wales, including Tasmania. One species, the prickly anglerfish, is found in rocky reefs, frequently under rocks, ledges and around jetties while the sponge anglerfish inhabits rocky reefs where it associates with sponges. They are found as deep as 70 m (230 ft).
