= Lophiocharon trisignatus =

Conservation status
- Least Concern (IUCN 3.1)

Scientific classification
- Kingdom: Animalia
- Phylum: Chordata
- Class: Actinopterygii
- Order: Lophiiformes
- Family: Antennariidae
- Genus: Lophiocharon
- Species: L. trisignatus

Binomial name
- Lophiocharon trisignatus (Richardson, 1844)

Synonyms
- Chironectes trisignatus Richardson, 1844; Antennarius trisignatus (Richardson, 1844); Antennarius urophthalmus Bleeker, 1851; Antennarius lindgreeni Bleeker, 1855; Antennarius asper Macleay, 1881; Lophiocharon broomensis Whitley, 1933

Species of fish

Lophiocharon trisignatus, the spot-tail anglerfish, rough anglerfish or three-spot frogfish, is a species of marine ray-finned fish belonging to the subfamily Histiophryninae in the family Antennariidae, the frogfishes. This fish is found in the Indo-Pacific region.

== Taxonomy ==
Lophiocharon trisignatus was first formally described as Chironectes trisignatus by the Scottish naval surgeon, Arctic explorer and naturalist John Richardson in the Ichthyology of the voyage of H.M.S. Erebus & Terror :under the command of Captain Sir James Clark Ross, R.N., F.R.S., with its type locality given as Broome, Western Australia. In 1933 Gilbert Percy Whitley described a new species of fish Lophiocharon broomensis, also from Broome, which he designated as the type species of a new monospecific genus, Lophiocharon. Whitley's L. broomensis is now considered to be a synonym of Richardson's C. trisignatus. Some authorities classify Lophiocharon in the subfamily Histiophryninae within the family Antennariidae., while others recognise it as the family Histiophrynidae. However, the 5th edition of Fishes of the World does not recognise subfamilies within the Antennariidae, classifying the family within the suborder Antennarioidei within the order Lophiiformes, the anglerfishes.

== Etymology ==
Lophiocharon trisignatus has the genus name Lophiocharon, which Richardson did not explain. It is thought to be a combination of Lophius, the type genus of the order Lophiiformes, and may be being used as a general term for anglerfishes, with Charon, the ferryman who ferried the dead across the Styx. The specific name, trisin=gnatus means "marked three times", an allusion to the three spots on the sides of some specimens.

== Description ==
Lophiocharon trisignatus has the second and third dorsal spines free of the skin and not hidden underneath it. All of the fin rays in the caudal fin are bifurcate. The skin has a covering of dermal denticles and the third dorsal spine is joined for more than a quarter of its length to the nape by a membrane or is connected to the soft dorsal fin by skin, and is connected to the second spine at its base. The caudal fin is typically marked with translucent ocelli between every second fin ray. The illicium, or fishing rod, is long and naked and is tipped with a large and complex esca, or lure. This fish does not have a caudal peduncle and the rear margins of the dorsal and anal fins are joined to thee base of the outermost fin rays of the caudal fin. The lobe of the pectoral fin resembles and arm and is widely connected to the body. The dorsal fin is supported by 12 or 13 soft rays while the anal fin contains between 6 and 8 soft rays. The spot-tail anglerfish has a maximum published standard length of 14.7 cm (5.8 in), making it the largest of the three Lophiocharon anglerfishes.

== Distribution and habitat ==
Lophiocharon trisignatus is found in the Indo-Pacific region from Singapore east through Indonesia to the Philippines south to Australia. In Australia it ranges from Shark Bay in Western Australia north and east to Thursday Island in Queensland. It is found at depths between 2 and 52 m (6 ft 7 in and 170 ft 7 in), although typically no deeper than 20 m (66 ft), among coastal coral and rocky reefs, as well as under wharf pilings or amongst debris and rubble.

== Biology ==
Lophiocharon trisignatus is a solitary fish. The illicium and esca are used to lure potential prey, typically small fishes, to within the striking distance of the large mouth. Frogfishes and anglerfishes are inefficient swimmers, and prefer to move around using their limb like pectoral fins to shuffle along the substrate. The female lays a cluster of eggs that the male broods, attching it to the side of his body. There may be as many as 650 large, <3 mm (0.12 in), round eggs in the cluster. The egg cluster may also serve to attract prey.
