= Moral compass =

Moral value system that provides guidance on the morality of choices

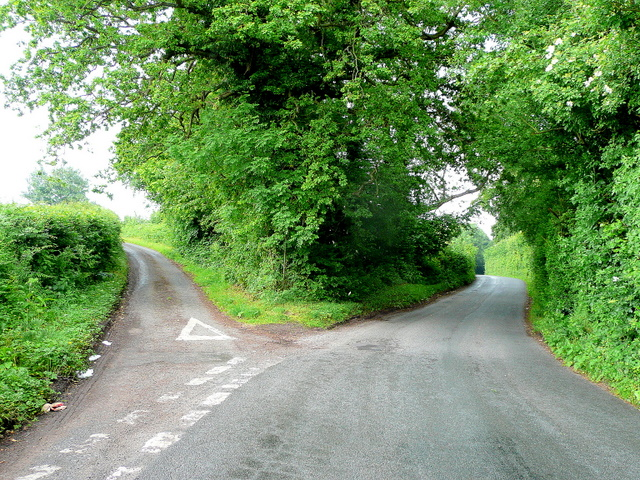
A moral compass provides guidance on "good" and "right" choices on the "path of life".

A moral compass is a metaphor for a moral value system that provides guidance on "good" or "right" choices in human interaction, and especially in decision-making situations. This value system can be very personal or represented by a larger group. Examples might be a certain philosophy, a religion, or the embodiment of this value system by a certain person or defined organization.

== Metaphor ==
The metaphor uses the image of a compass, a navigational instrument that allows the cardinal directions to be clearly determined in the earth's magnetic field with a freely rotating magnetized needle.

The figurative meaning of a "moral compass" makes it an orientation aid on the "path of life" or the "stormy seas of life" providing the ability to make moral distinctions between "good" or "right" choices and "evil" or "wrong" choices in interpersonal relationships, especially in difficult, potentially conflict-laden situations that call for a decision to be made.

The term "ethical compass", or "ethical moral compass", is sometimes used synonymously with moral compass. Strictly speaking, however, ethics deals with the theory of morality, i.e. ethics is the science that examines the various aspects of morality.

== Use of the metaphor ==
=== Early use ===
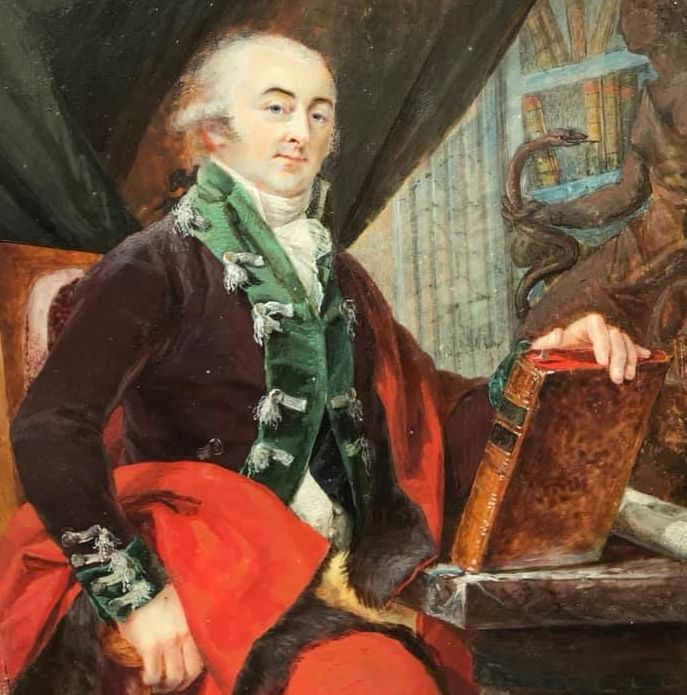
Nicolas-Gabriel Le Clerc

The exact historical origin and the actual originator of the metaphor "moral compass" are not clearly documented. An analogous formulation can already be found in French before it appeared in English and German literature.

In 1780, the French physician, historian and friend of the Enlightenment Nicolas-Gabriel Le Clerc (1726–1798) published the book La boussole morale et politique des hommes et des empires (The Moral and Political Compass of Men and Empires), which was already announced in 1779.

The Oxford English Dictionary states that the earliest known use of the English term "moral compass" dates back to 1843, penned by the English writer Charles Dickens in the novel Martin Chuzzlewit. However, this metaphor is mentioned as early as the 1830s: in The New British Novelist, Comprising Works by the Most Popular and Fashionable Writers of the Present Day (1830), in The works of Thomas Moore (1832), and in The Works of Lord Byron: With His Letters and Journals, and His Life (1835).

The American Merriam-Webster's Collegiate Dictionary documents that the term was first used in 1814 in the book An Inquiry Into the Principles and Policy of the Government of the United States by the American politician John Taylor.

In German, the metaphor "moralischer Kompass" was not used in literature until the end of the 19th century (1899). However, the similar phrase "Kompass der Moralität" can be found as early as 1811 in the book Die jüngern Horen by the German writer Karl Ferdinand Menke (actually Karl Ferdinand Manko; 1772–1819), which he wrote together with his friend Christoph Christian Hohlfeldt.

=== Examples ===
The metaphor is used in a variety of ways in the media to show that an accepted moral course of action exists (a person "has a moral compass"), an immoral course of action exists ("lacks a moral compass"), or a course of action has been changed ("has lost his or her moral compass") or diverted ("has a moral compass that has been misdirected").

Examples:

- Misdirected moral compass – "Hence, the moral compass of bankers, while expressing care for clients, is continuously misdirected by the utilitarian institutional setting of the organizational field."
- Lost moral compass – Europe is losing its moral compass – how will it find its way without Merkel?
- Broken moral compass – The Church's Broken Moral Compass – The scandal is the biggest problem the Church (and the world) is facing, and has faced for centuries.
- Wildly spinning moral compass – "For Pence, however, a delicate balancing act has proved necessary with regard to his alliance with a man whose moral compass spins as wildly as Donald Trump's appears to do, at least with regard to his personal behaviour."

=== Use in other languages ===
The metaphor is widespread and is also used in Polish (kompas moralny), Portuguese (bússola moral), Spanish (brújula moral), Swedish and Danish (moralisk kompas(s)) etc.

== Psychological experiment on moral compass ==
Lars Hall and colleagues from the Swedish University of Lund have shown in experiments that test subjects with a clearly stated moral compass are able to quickly and flexibly change it.

In the experiment, the researchers first had the test subjects fill out questionnaires on their moral views, which covered both basic attitudes and current hotly debated topics in the media. A sleight of hand was used – without the participants' knowledge – to change the answers marked on the questionnaires into their opposite meaning. It was then investigated whether the participants confronted with this were prepared to endorse and support the opposite view (which they had written down only a few moments ago and which they now saw reversed). The result showed that (a) the majority of reversals went undetected; (b) 69% of participants were unable to recognize at least one of two changes; and (c) participants additionally constructed coherent and unambiguous arguments supporting the opposite of their original position.

The results thus obtained suggest "a dramatic potential for flexibility in our moral attitudes" and point to a clear role of self-attribution and subsequent rationalization in attitude formation and change.

== Publications ==
There are a large number of international publications (books and scientific articles) that deal with the importance of the moral compass in general, in politics, business, religion, etc. The following list by date of publication gives a few selected examples.

- William Bennett: The Moral Compass: Stories for a Life's Journey, Simon & Schuster (1995), ISBN 978-0684803135.
- Lindsay J. Thompson: The Global Moral Compass for Business in Journal of Business Ethics (2010), vol. 93, pp 15–32: In respect to business managers who face specific international issues (e.g. climate change, intellectual property rights, economic inequity, human rights etc.), ethicist Lindsay J. Thompson suggests to exchange the individual moral compass with a "Global Moral Compass", an "expanded epistemic value framework as an aid to understanding and managing moral complexity in a globalized business culture".
- Philip Pettit: Just Freedom: A Moral Compass for a Complex World, W. W. Norton & Company (2014), ISBN 978-0393063974.
- Christoph Giersch, Marcus Freitag (Hrsg.): Das Gewissen – moralischer Kompass mit unbedingtem Verbindlichkeitsanspruch? Eine interdisziplinäre Annäherung, Verlag für Polizeiwissenschaft, Frankfurt am Main (2015), ISBN 978-3-86676-421-7.
- Joan Marques: A Mindful Moral Compass for Twenty-First Century Leadership: The Noble Eightfold Path (2017), in The Journal of Values-Based Leadership, vol. 10:1, Article 7.
- Neema Parvini: Shakespeare's Moral Compass, Edinburgh University Press (2018).
- Helwig Schmidt-Glintzer: Der Edle und der Ochse: Chinas Eliten und ihr moralischer Kompass, Matthes & Seitz Berlin (2022), ISBN 978-3751805421.
- Joseph L. Badaracco: Your True Moral Compass: Defining Reality, Responsibility, and Practicality in Your Leadership Moments, Springer Verlag (2023).
- Saortua Marbun: Moralischer Kompass: Die Rolle der religiösen Ethik bei der Gestaltung der modernen Gesetzgebung, Verlag Unser Wissen (2024), ISBN 978-6207783571.
- La Boussole Morale : Quatre Histoires de Luttes Éthiques: L'autre Tartuffe, ou La mère coupable, Conscience, Le crime de Lord Arthur Savile, Manon Lescaut, etc., mit Texten von Pierre Augustin Caron de Beaumarchais, Hector Malot, Oscar Wilde und Abbé Prévost, Éditions Omnibus Classiques (2024).

== See also ==
- Daimonion
