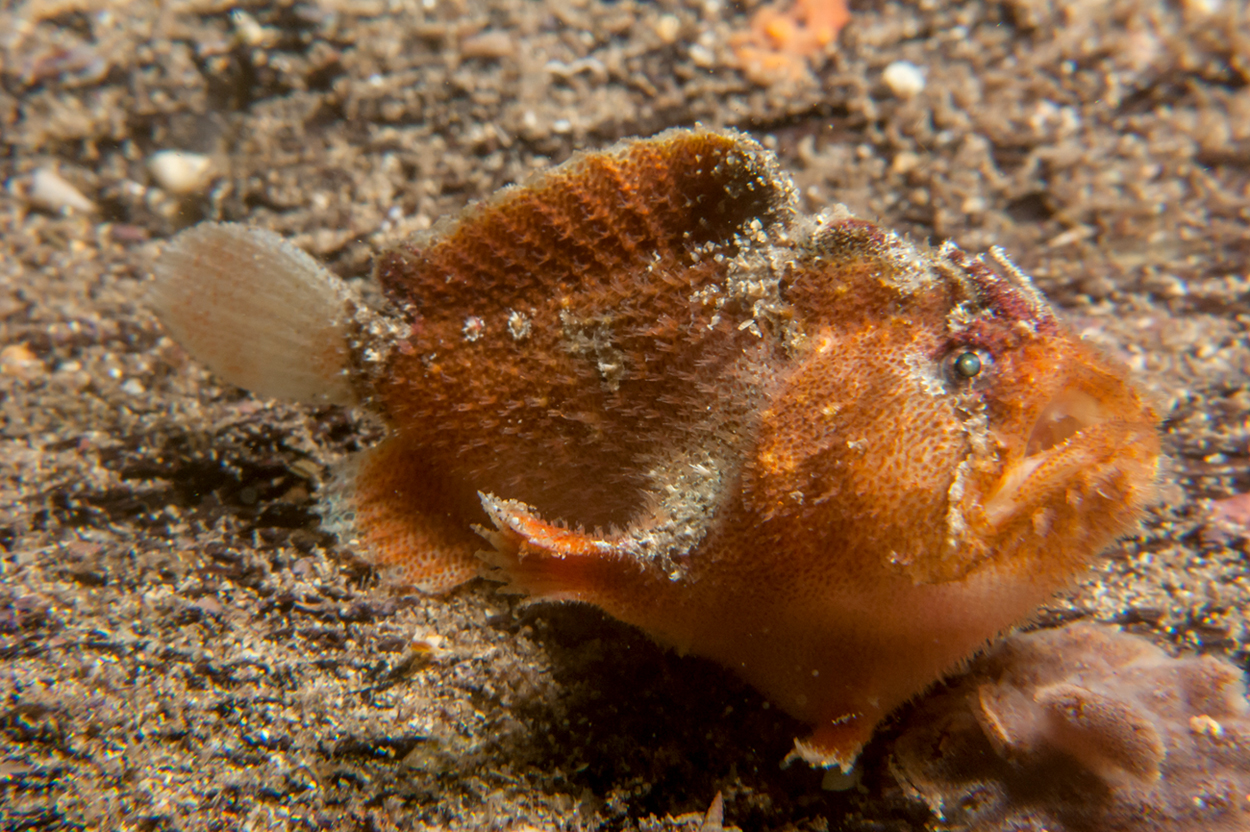

Scientific classification
- Kingdom: Animalia
- Phylum: Chordata
- Class: Actinopterygii
- Order: Lophiiformes
- Family: Antennariidae
- Genus: Echinophryne
- Species: E. crassispina

Binomial name
- Echinophryne crassispina McCulloch & Waite, 1918

= Echinophryne crassispina =

Species of fish

Echinophryne crassispina, the prickly anglerfish, prickly frogfish or thick-spined anglerfish, is a species of marine ray-finned fish belonging to the subfamily Histiophryninae in the family Antennariidae, the frogfishes. These fishes are endemic to the temperate waters of southern Australia.

== Taxonomy ==
Echinophryne crassispina was first formally described in 1918 by the Australian ichthyologists Allan Riverstone McCulloch and Edgar Ravenswood Waite with its type locality given as Spencer Gulf in South Australia. When they described this new species McCulloch and Waite designated it as the type species of a new monospecific genus, Echinophryne. Some authorities classify Echinophryne in the subfamily Histiophryninae within the family Antennariidae., while others recognise it as the family Histiophrynidae. However, the 5th edition of Fishes of the World does not recognise subfamilies within the Antennariidae, classifying the family within the suborder Antennarioidei within the order Lophiiformes, the anglerfishes.

== Etymology ==
Echinophryne crassispina has the genus name Echinophryne which combines echinos, meaning "spiny", a reference to the skin of the type species which was described as "thickly beset with large, upstanding, bifurcate spinules", with phryne, meaning "toad", a common used suffix for anglerfish genera, it may date as far back as Aristotle and Cicero, who referred to anglerfishes as "fishing-frogs" and "sea-frogs", respectively, this is assumed to be an allusion to the frog- or toad-like appearance of these fishes. The specific name, crassispina, compounds crassus, meaning "thick" or "fat", with spina, which means spine, an allusion to the relatively thick illicium.

== Description ==
Echinophryne crassispina has a short and deep body with a dense covering of bifurcate spinules. Its eyes are encircled by closely set spinules too. The caudal peduncle is short and the illicium, the "fishing rod", lacks an obvious lure, or esca. There are 2 further dorsal spines and a soft dorsal fin that is supported by 15 or 16 soft rays while the anal fin contains between 8 and 10 soft rays. The dorsal and anal fins are not connected to the caudal fin. The colour of the body varies, it is normally cream, yellow, orange or even slaty grey, marked with dark brown latticing and marbling. There is a white crustaceous marking on the head and the anal and caudal fins each have a clear dark brown band along the middle and another at the fin margin. The prickly anglerfish has a maximum published total length of 7 cm (2.8 in)>

== Distribution and habitat ==
Echinophryne crassispina is endemic to the temperate waters of southern Australia being found as far north as Jervis Bay in New South Wales, south to northern Tasmania east to the southwestern coast of the Eyre Peninsula in South Australia. The prickly anglerfish is found at depths between 0 and 20 m (0 and 66 ft) living on rocky reefs, often hiding beneath rocks, under ledges and around jetties.

== Biology ==
Echinophryne crassispina feeds mainly on small decapod crustaceans. The prickly anglerfish breeds during the early summer when females lay around 150 eggs onto a rocky substrate, the eggs being adhered to the rock, and to each other, by filaments. The males then guard the eggs until they hatch, creating a "pocket" between the body and the tail.

== Utilisation and conservation ==
Echinophryne crassispina is collected for the aquarium trade and under the Tasmanian Living Marine Resources Management Act 1995, Fisheries (Scalefish) Rules 2004 - Regulation 100, a person holding a personal fishing licence is limited to having 3 specimens of this species while in Tasmanian waters. Thisspecies has not been evaluated for the International Union for Conservation of Nature's Red Data Book.
