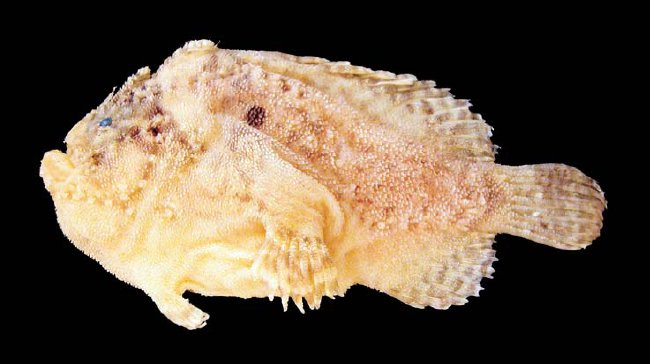

Scientific classification
- Kingdom: Animalia
- Phylum: Chordata
- Class: Actinopterygii
- Order: Lophiiformes
- Family: Antennariidae
- Genus: Lophiocharon
- Species: L. hutchinsi

Binomial name
- Lophiocharon hutchinsi Pietsch, 2004

= Lophiocharon hutchinsi =

Species of fish

Lophiocharon hutchinsi, known as Hutchins' anglerfish, is a species of fish in the family Antennariidae. It is native to the Western Pacific, where it has been reported from Australia and the Aru Islands. It occurs at a depth range of 2 to 9 m (7 to 30 ft) and reaches 4.9 cm (1.9 inches) SL. The species is benthopelagic and has been collected from areas with sandy mud, seagrass, and sponges, and it was first described in 2004 and named after Barry Hutchins of the Western Australian Museum. It differs from other members of the genus Lophiocharon in fin morphology, with the illicium of this species being smaller and bearing a less distinct esca.
