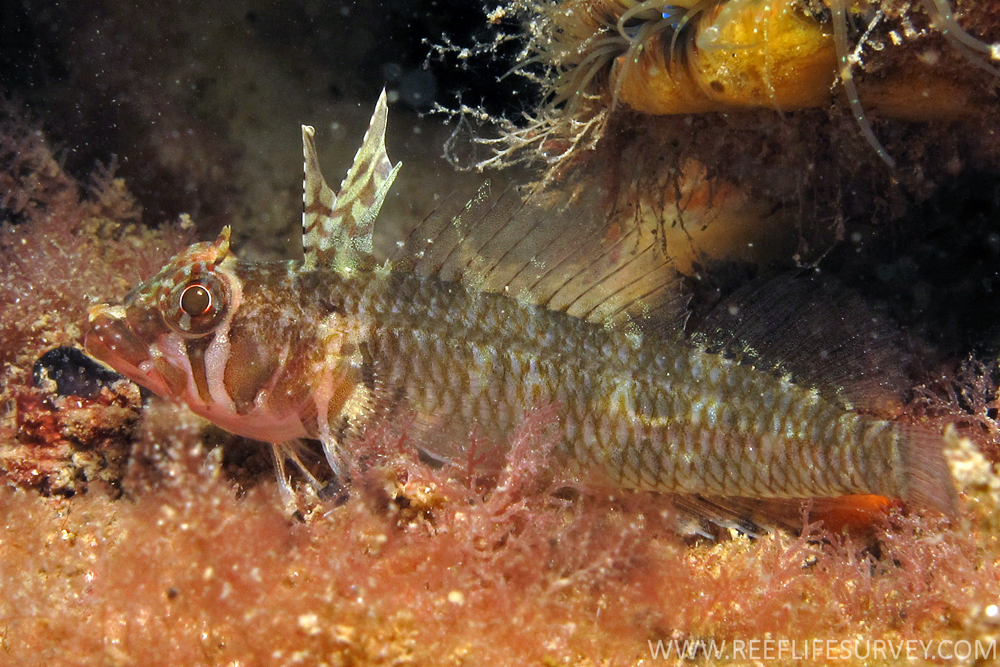

Conservation status
- Least Concern (IUCN 3.1)

Scientific classification
- Kingdom: Animalia
- Phylum: Chordata
- Class: Actinopterygii
- Order: Blenniiformes
- Family: Tripterygiidae
- Genus: Trinorfolkia
- Species: T. cristata

Binomial name
- Trinorfolkia cristata (Kuiter, 1986)

Synonyms
- Norfolkia cristata Kuiter, 1986

= Crested triplefin =

Species of fish

The crested triplefin or crested threefin (Trinorfolkia cristata) is a species of triplefin blenny in the genus Trinorfolkia. It was described by Rudie Kuiter in 1986. This species is endemic to the coasts of South Australia from Sceale Bay to Victor Harbor, including Kangaroo Island. It is found in rocky reefs from the intertidal zone to a depth of 15 metres (49 ft), among boulders, on vertical rock walls and on man-made structures such as piers and jetties.
