= Histiophryne maggiewalker =

Scientific classification
- Kingdom: Animalia
- Phylum: Chordata
- Class: Actinopterygii
- Division: Teleostei
- Order: Lophiiformes
- Family: Antennariidae
- Genus: Histiophryne
- Species: H. maggiewalker

Binomial name
- Histiophryne maggiewalker Arnold & Pietsch, 2011

Species of fish

Histiophryne maggiewalker, known as the Queensland frogfish, is a species of fish in the family Antennariidae. It is known only from Australia, where it occurs in shallow inshore waters at a depth range of 7 to 12 m (23 to 39 ft). Males of the species reach 5.5 cm (2.2 inches) SL (standard length), whereas females are slightly larger at up to 6 cm (2.3 inches) SL. The species was described in 2011 by Rachel Arnold and Theodore Pietsch from six specimens collected in shallow waters off Queensland, and it is named for Maggie Walker, for her service and dedication to science and education at the University of Washington and the Burke Museum of Natural History and Culture.
