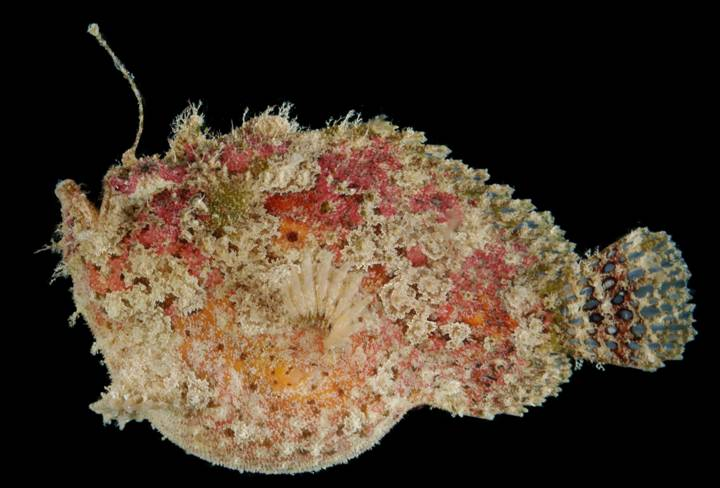

Scientific classification
- Kingdom: Animalia
- Phylum: Chordata
- Class: Actinopterygii
- Order: Lophiiformes
- Family: Antennariidae
- Genus: Lophiocharon
- Species: L. lithinostomus

Binomial name
- Lophiocharon lithinostomus (Jordan & Richardson, 1908)

Synonyms
- Antennarius lithinostomus

= Lophiocharon lithinostomus =

Species of fish

Lophiocharon lithinostomus, known as the marble-mouthed frogfish, is a species of fish in the family Antennariidae native to the Western Pacific. It is known from the Sulu Sea, where it inhabits coastal reefs and occurs at a depth range of 1 to 10 m (3 to 33 ft). It is a demersal oviparous fish reaching 9.1 cm (3.6 in) SL. The species is noted to closely resemble a rock covered in algae.
