= Gwen Morton Spencer =

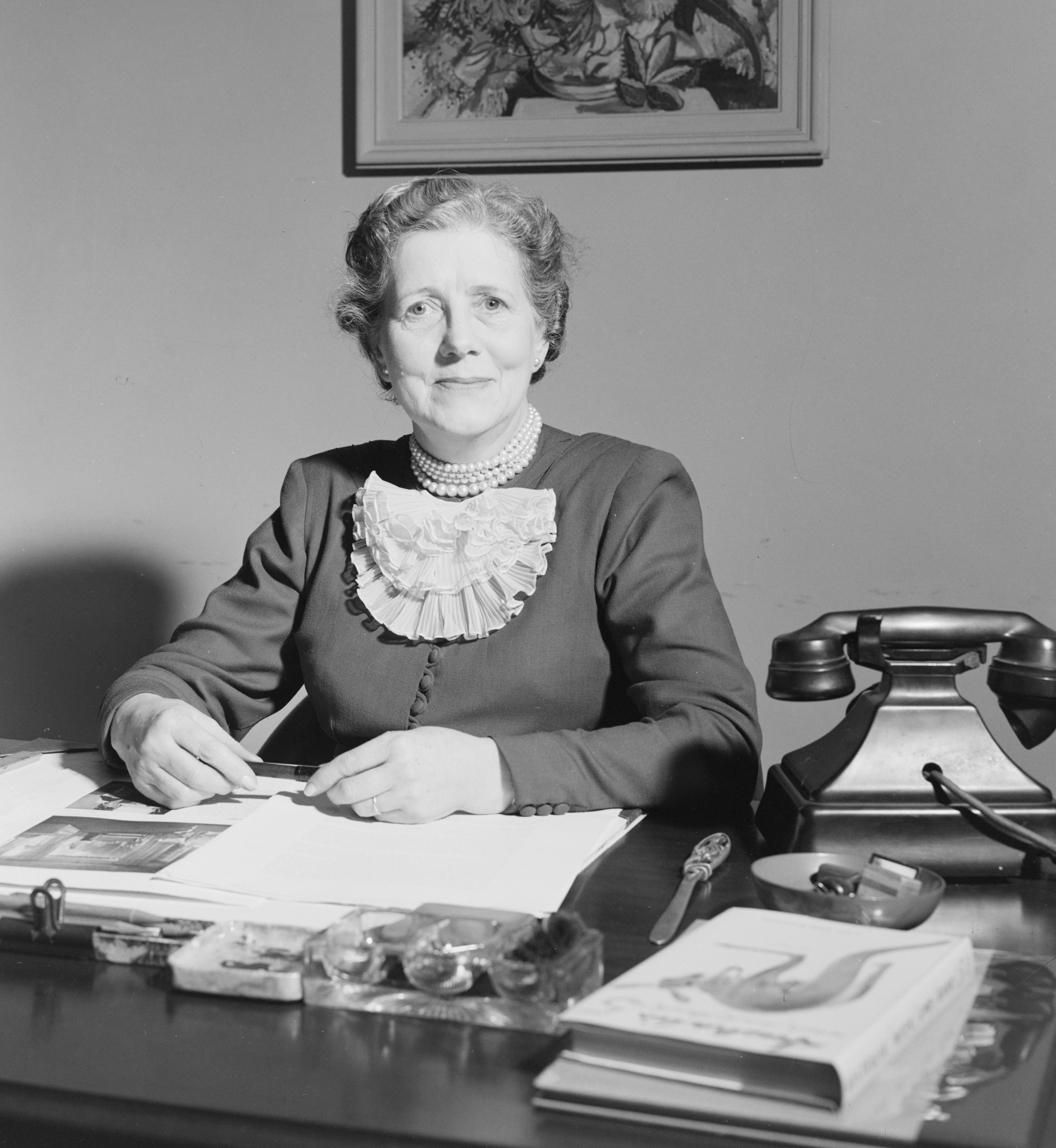
- Portrait of Gwen Morton Spencer, ca. 1948
- Born: Gwendoline Gladys Spencer; April 1, 1888; Hobart, Australia
- Died: August 15, 1974 (aged 86); New South Wales
- Occupations: journalist, editor and art critic
- Known for: managing editor of Ure Smith Pty Ltd.

Gwendoline Gladys Spencer (1 April 1888 – 15 August 1974), generally known as Gwen Morton Spencer, was an Australian journalist, editor and art critic.

== History ==
Spencer was born in Hobart, Tasmania, to Caroline Eliza "Carrie" Morton, née Mills, (Note: Carrie was a sister of public servant Stephen Mills.) and American naturalist Alexander Morton, who married in 1884.

She was educated at the Collegiate School, Hobart. On 1 March 1909, she married engineer Henry John Spencer; in 1913 they had twins, a boy and girl, stillborn. They later moved to Sydney.

In 1924, her younger sister Dorothy married architect John D. Moore, and through him, Spencer was introduced to Sydney Ure Smith, and in 1927 she became sub-editor to Ure Smith's magazine Home.

She left Ure Smith for London in 1932 and in 1933 was appointed fashion editor for Queen (later known as Harper's Bazaar. While in Sydney on holiday in 1937 she accepted a post on Associated Newspapers' Woman magazine, under Vera Hamilton, editor since 1935.

In 1939, Ure Smith Pty Ltd launched a new arts and lifestyle monthly, Australia: National Journal, and appointed Spencer as co-editor with Ure Smith himself. Spencer took an increasingly responsible role in the management of Australia and its "Christmas annual", Week-end Book, to no avail, as it never became profitable. Australia ceased publication in 1947, but she had become indispensable to the company and by 1949 was a managing editor of Ure Smith Pty Ltd. She retired in 1951, but remained a director and took on occasional projects for the company.

Her husband died in 1941; she died in 1974 and was cremated.

== Recognition and memberships ==
Spencer was twice a guest of honour at Society of Women Writers functions: in 1932 and 1952.

She was a member of the NSW chapter of the Fellowship of Australian Writers and the Sydney P.E.N. Club.
