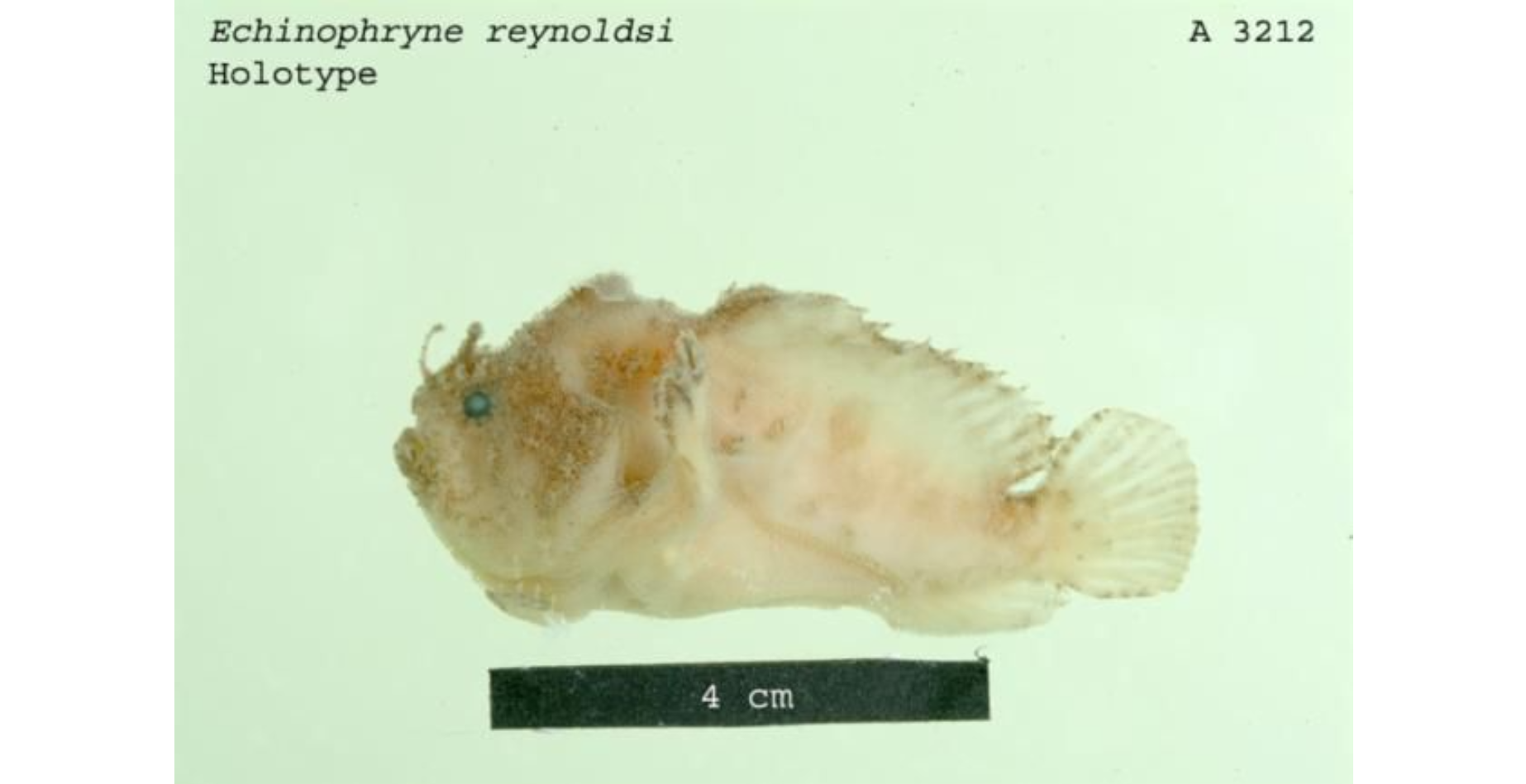
- Holotype NMV A 3212

Scientific classification
- Domain: Eukaryota
- Kingdom: Animalia
- Phylum: Chordata
- Class: Actinopterygii
- Order: Lophiiformes
- Family: Antennariidae
- Genus: Echinophryne
- Species: E. reynoldsi

Binomial name
- Echinophryne reynoldsi Pietsch & Kuiter, 1984

= Echinophryne reynoldsi =

Species of fish

Paratype site: (NMV A 3064) Portsea reef'"`UNIQ--ref-0000000A-QINU`"'

Echinophryne reynoldsi (known as the sponge anglerfish, Reynold's anglerfish, and Reynold's frogfish) is a species of fish in the family Antennariidae. It was first described in 1984 by Theodore Wells Pietsch III and Rudie Hermann Kuiter.

It is endemic to Australia, where it occurs inshore and is typically associated with sponges. It is a benthic oviparous species that reaches 8 cm (3.1 inches) in total length. Like other members of the genus Echinophryne but unlike most frogfish, the species does not have a distinct esca or "lure" on its illicium.
