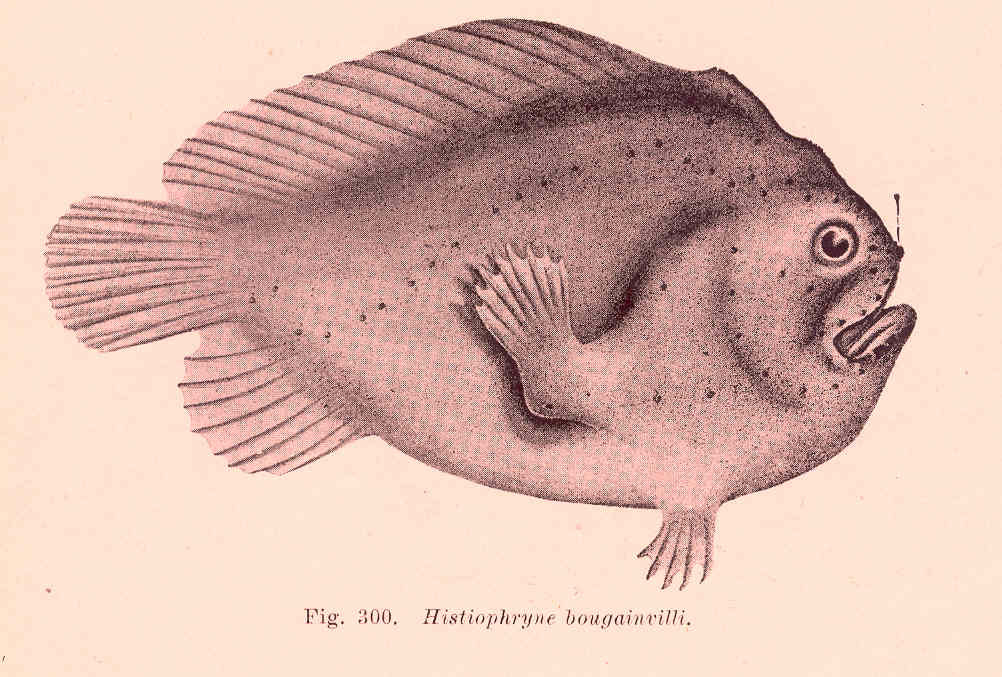

Scientific classification
- Kingdom: Animalia
- Phylum: Chordata
- Class: Actinopterygii
- Order: Lophiiformes
- Family: Antennariidae
- Genus: Histiophryne
- Species: H. bougainvilli

Binomial name
- Histiophryne bougainvilli (Valenciennes, 1837)

= Histiophryne bougainvilli =

Species of fish

Histiophryne bougainvilli, commonly known as the Smooth Anglerfish, is a frogfish found in the waters of Queensland, New South Wales, and Western Australia. There are an estimated 40 specimens known.

The sexes of the Smooth Anglerfish are separate, and fertilisation is external. Unlike most anglerfishes, female Smooth Anglerfish lay a cluster of large demersal eggs that are attached together and to the parent body by filaments. The eggs are brooded in a pocket created behind the pectoral fin by the curved body and tail and beneath the folded dorsal fin. One egg cluster that was examined contained about 105 eggs that measured 2.9 to 3.9 mm in diameter. Smooth Anglerfish eggs hatch into relatively large, advanced young.
