= Histiophryne narungga =

Scientific classification
- Kingdom: Animalia
- Phylum: Chordata
- Class: Actinopterygii
- Order: Lophiiformes
- Family: Antennariidae
- Genus: Histiophryne
- Species: H. narungga

Binomial name
- Histiophryne narungga R. J. Arnold & Pietsch, 2018

Species of ray-finned fish

Histiophryne narungga, the rodless frogfish, is a species of ray-finned fish belonging to the subfamily Histiophryninae in the family Antennariidae, the frogfishes. This fish is endemic to the temperate waters of southern Australia.
