= Notched triplefin =

Conservation status
- Least Concern (IUCN 3.1)

Scientific classification
- Kingdom: Animalia
- Phylum: Chordata
- Class: Actinopterygii
- Order: Blenniiformes
- Family: Tripterygiidae
- Genus: Trinorfolkia
- Species: T. incisa

Binomial name
- Trinorfolkia incisa (Kuiter, 1986)

Synonyms
- Norfolkia incisa Kuiter, 1986

Species of fish

Trinorfolkia incisa, known commonly as the notched triplefin or notched threefin, is a species of triplefin blenny in the genus Trinorfolkia. It was described by Rudie Kuiter in 1986. This species is found at depths of between 10 and 30 metres (33 and 98 ft) on the roofs of caves. This species occurs along the southern coast of Australia from the south western coast of Western Australia to Victoria and around Tasmania.
