= Euro-Sinica =

Euro-Sinica is a scholarly series, published by the European academic publisher Peter Lang. The series focuses primarily on intercultural and transcultural studies, including intellectual history, of Europe and China.

The monograph series was founded by Adrian Hsia, of McGill University, following the first Sino-German symposium on intercultural relations immediately after the opening of China subsequent to the Cultural Revolution. The symposium was co-organized by Hsia and Professor Guenther Debon, University of Heidelberg, and its proceedings entitled Goethe und China, China und Goethe (1985) were published as volume one of the series. Later on, the prominent Chinese novelist and scholar Qian Zhongshu wrote the Chinese title of Euro-Sinica in his beautiful calligraphy which constitutes a part of the book cover since volume three. So far, twelve volumes have been published in English, French, and German, covering the three domains mentioned above.

In this series of intellectual probings, the terms "Europe" and "China" are not to be understood geo-politically, but rather culturally. Wherever a European language is used as the official language, such a country is considered to belong to the European cultural group. In a similar vein, wherever Chinese ideograms are used and the tenets of Confucianism, Taoism, and Chinese Buddhism are followed, these countries are regarded as the Sinic group. Studies on both cultural groups are also included in the monograph series. The third domain of Euro-Sinica constitutes analyses of ethnic Chinese artists and thinkers living in the West.

Published Titles

Vol No.	Title	Author/Editor
1	Goethe und China, China und Goethe - Bericht des Heidelberger Symposions	Debon, Günther / Hsia, Adrian (eds.)
2	Oscar Wilde und der Taoismus. Oscar Wilde and Taoism	Debon, Günther
3	Fernöstliche Brückenschläge Zu deutsch-chinesischen Literaturbeziehungen im 20. Jahrhundert	Hsia, Adrian / Hoefert, Sigfrid (ed.)
4	Zur Rezeption von Goethes «Faust» in Ostasien	Hsia, Adrian (ed.)
5	TAO: Reception in East and West	Hsia, Adrian (ed.)
6	The Theme of Chastity in Hau Ch'iu Chuan and Parallel Western Fiction	Cheung, Kai Chong
7	Kafka and China	Hsia, Adrian (ed.)
8	Jenseits von Weimar: Goethes Weg zum Fernen Osten 2., unveränderte Auflage	Kimura, Naoji
9	Die Dienerfigur in deutschen und chinesischen Theaterstücken	Wang, Jian
10	Aspects of Diaspora: Studies on North American Chinese Writers	Bernier, Lucie (ed.)
11	Western Philosophy in China 1993-1997: A Bibliography	Meissner, Werner
12	Drawing the Dragon: Western European Reinvention of China	Tao, Zhijian
