= Thomas Heberer (sinologist) =

German sinologist

- Born: November 3, 1947 (age 79); Offenbach am Main, West Germany
- Citizenship: German
- Education: University of Bremen (PhD)
- Occupation: Sinologist
- Employer: University of Duisburg-Essen

Thomas Heberer (Chinese: 王海; born 3 November 1947) is a German social anthropologist and political scientist specializing in Chinese politics and society. He has conducted extensive research on local governance, minorities’ policies, and the political role of private entrepreneurs in China.

== Education and early career ==
Heberer studied social anthropology, philosophy, political science, and Chinese studies at several German universities. He earned his doctorate from the University of Bremen in 1977 with a dissertation on the Chinese Communist Party’s Mass Line concept. Between 1977 and 1981, he worked in Beijing as a reader and translator for the German edition of the Peking Review, observing China’s transition from the Cultural Revolution to the reform era.

== Academic career ==
Upon returning to Germany, Heberer held research positions at institutions including the Übersee-Museum Bremen and the University of Bremen. He completed a habilitation on China’s informal economic sector, receiving the venia legendi in political science.

Heberer’s professorships include:

- University for Applied Sciences in Bremen (1991–1992)
- Chair of political science with a focus on East Asia, University of Trier (1992–1998)
- Chair in East Asian politics, University of Duisburg-Essen (1998–2013)

After retirement, he was appointed senior professor at Duisburg-Essen until the end of 2025. He has also held visiting appointments at Seoul National University, the University of Washington, National Taiwan University, Zhejiang University, and Peking University.

== Research and themes ==
Heberer’s work is influenced by social theorists including James C. Scott, Pierre Bourdieu, Theodor W. Adorno, Norbert Elias, Lucian W. Pye, and Michel Foucault. He emphasizes field research as essential for understanding societies from within. He has written on the concept of “the scientist as a traveler,” highlighting the personal and intellectual insights gained through immersive research.

His research focuses on:

- Ethnic minority policy, particularly the Yi (Nosu) in Liangshan, Sichuan Province
- Rural–urban development and social change in China
- Political roles of private entrepreneurs and local cadres
- Environmental governance and community politics in urban China
- Social disciplining, civilizing processes, and political morality
- Digital representation in Chinese society.

Heberer has published extensively in German, English, and Chinese, including monographs and edited volumes.

Together with Gunter Schubert, he developed the sociological concept of “strategic groups” to analyze the behavior of local cadres and entrepreneurs in development processes.

== Public engagement and institutional roles ==
Heberer has served on editorial boards for journals including The China Quarterly, The European Journal of East Asian Studies, and the Journal of Current Chinese Affairs. He co-founded the German Association of Social Science Research on China (ASC) and has contributed to public discussions on China in German-language media and academic forums.

== Controversy ==
In September 2023, Heberer co-authored an opinion piece with sinologist Helwig Schmidt-Glintzer following a self-funded visit to Xinjiang by five German academics. The article suggested that Europeans should consider dialogue with Chinese authorities if conditions improved. The piece drew criticism for allegedly downplaying ongoing human rights concerns, though one author defended the authors, emphasizing the need for informed scholarly engagement.

Heberer and colleagues also published edited volumes on Xinjiang in 2024 (Xinjiang – eine Region im Spannungsfeld von Geschichte und Moderne, LIT, 2024, German) and 2026 (Xinjiang – A Region at the Crossroads of History and Modernity, LIT, 2026, English), reviewed critically for their explicit and naive one-sidedness.

== Selected book publications ==
Heberer's complete publication list: https://www.uni-due.de/in-east/politik_und_gesellschaft_chinas/publikationen.php

- T. Heberer, China and Its National Minorities: Autonomy or Assimilation?, M.E. Sharpe, 1989.
- T. Heberer, Doing Business in Rural China: Liangshan’s New Ethnic Entrepreneurs. University of Washington Press, 2007.
- T. Heberer and C. Göbel, The Politics of Community Building in Urban China, Routledge 2011.
- J. Fan, T. Heberer, and W. Taubmann, Rural China: Economic and Social Change in the Late Twentieth Century. Routledge, 2015.
- T. Heberer and G. Schubert, Weapons of the Rich: Strategic Action of Private Entrepreneurs in Contemporary China. World Scientific, 2020.
- T. Heberer, Social Disciplining and Civilising Processes in China. The Politics of Morality and the Morality of Politics, Routledge, 2023.
- T. Heberer, China Neu Denken. Wie ein Land sich verändert und unser Jahrhundert prägt [Rethinking China. How a Country is Changing and Shaping Our Century (in German)], Drachenhaus-Verlag 2026.
