= Cryptic anglerfish =

Scientific classification
- Kingdom: Animalia
- Phylum: Chordata
- Class: Actinopterygii
- Order: Lophiiformes
- Family: Antennariidae
- Genus: Histiophryne
- Species: H. cryptacanthus

Binomial name
- Histiophryne cryptacanthus (M. C. W. Weber, 1913)

Species of fish

The cryptic anglerfish (Histiophryne cryptacanthus) is a frogfish found in waters ranging from Taiwan to South Australia. There are an estimated 75 specimens known. The luring appendage on its forehead is reduced to nearly nothing.
