= David J. Hall (photographer) =

Underwater wildlife photographer, author, and naturalist

David J. Hall (born October 2, 1943) is an underwater wildlife photographer, author, and naturalist. His photographs have appeared in hundreds of books, magazines, calendars, and other print media worldwide, including National Geographic, Smithsonian, Natural History, Sierra, Time, Science, Scientific American, Geo, Terre Sauvage, and BBC Wildlife. He is the recipient of many awards, including first place in two categories of the BBC Wildlife Photographer of the Year, first place in both the Nature's Best and Sierra magazine competitions, and third place in the Festival Mondial de l'Image Sous-Marine. He is also the recipient of an award from the International Institute for Species Exploration, for research leading to his co-authorship of the description of Histiophryne psychedelica, Psychedelic Frogfish, and generally considered to be one of the ten most significant new species described in 2009.

David Hall has written for photographic, scientific, natural history, and diving-oriented publications, and is the author or co-author of ten educational books for children. His most recent book, published in the United States, Canada, United Kingdom, and Germany, is Beneath Cold Seas: The Underwater Wilderness of the Pacific Northwest. Of Beneath Cold Seas, Christopher Newbert (author of the best-selling Within a Rainbowed Sea) has said: “David Hall shoots with the inquiring and exacting eye of a scientist yet the soul and vision of an artist, combining the two to produce uniquely beautiful underwater images that educate as much as they inspire.”

Hall began scuba diving in the 1960s and photographing underwater shortly thereafter. He discovered a love of nature and its inhabitants at an early age, and began photographing marine life primarily as a means to document the species he encountered. What started as a scientific endeavor, however, evolved into an artistic one. He began photographing professionally in 1980 and now sees his work as serving both aesthetic and environmental goals: "It has always been my hope that my fascination with, and respect for, all living things would show in my work and help to inspire similar feelings in others."

Hall has photographed in more than thirty countries or territories, including Australia, Bahamas, Belize, Canada, Cayman Islands, Costa Rica, Dominica, Dominican Republic, Ecuador (Galápagos), Egypt, Fiji, Indonesia, Israel, Japan, Malaysia, Maldives, Mexico, Micronesia, Myanmar, Netherlands (Bonaire), New Zealand, Palau, Papua New Guinea, Philippines, Seychelles, Solomon Islands, St. Vincent, Thailand, and Vanuatu.

Hall earned a B.S. in zoology and an M.D., and he practiced for several years as a diagnostic radiologist before retiring from medicine and becoming a full-time wildlife photographer.

David Hall resides in Woodstock, New York, with his wife, Gayle Jamison, who is also an award-winning wildlife photographer. He has two children, both of whom are certified scuba divers.

== Selected credits ==
- U.S. Magazines: Audubon, International Wildlife, National Geographic, Natural History, Oceans, Ocean Realm, Omni, Skin Diver, Sierra, Smithsonian, Time.
- International: Airone (Italy), BBC Wildlife (UK), Equinox (Canada), Geo (Germany), Sinra (Japan), Terre Sauvage (France).
- Calendars: Audubon, Sierra Club, World Wildlife Fund, Inner Reflection.
- Advertising: Discovery Channel, Microsoft, Nature Conservancy, Nikon.
