= Helwig Schmidt-Glintzer =

German sinologist (born 1948)

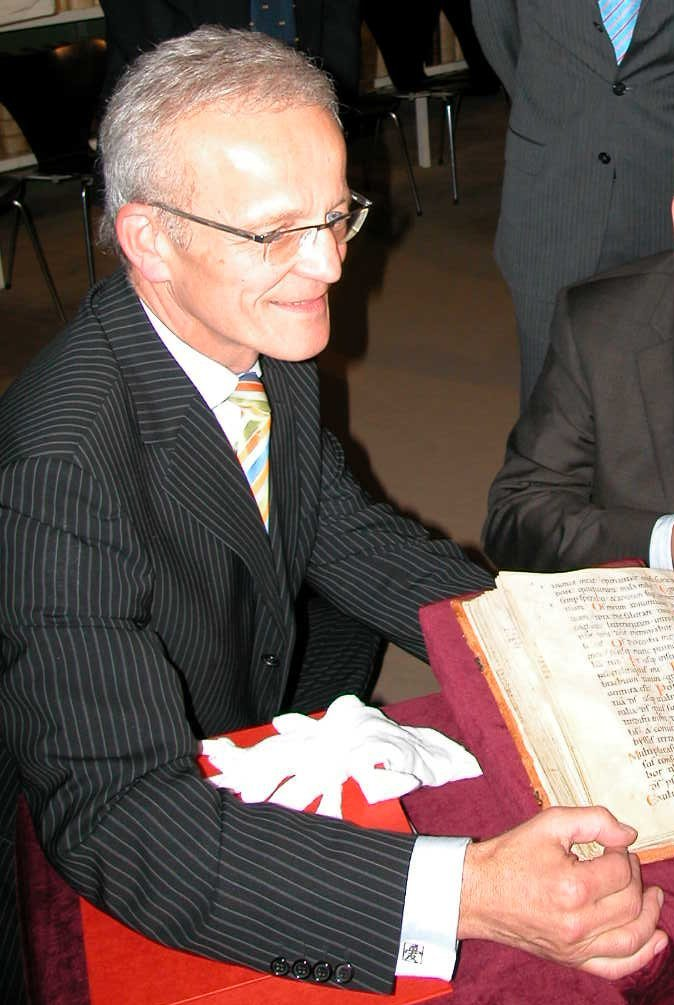
- Helwig Schmidt-Glintzer in September 2007.
- Born: June 24, 1948 (age 78); Bad Hersfeld, Hesse, Germany
- Education: University of Göttingen; LMU Munich
- Occupation: Sinologist
- Writing career
- Language: German, Chinese

Helwig Schmidt-Glintzer (Chinese: 施寒微; pinyin: Shī Hánwēi; born 24 June 1948) is a German sinologist who served as director of the Herzog August Library in Wolfenbüttel between 1993 and 2015. Since 2016 he has been director of China Centrum Tübingen (CCT).

== Biography ==
Helwig Schmidt-Glintzer was born in 1948 as the first son of the general practitioner Hansgeorg Schmidt-Glintzer and his wife Erika Budgenhagen. In 1967 he graduated from the old-style grammar school "Old Monastery School". He studied sinology, philosophy, ethnology, sociology and political science at the University of Göttingen and LMU Munich. In 1973, he earned his doctor's degree under Wolfgang Bauer.

In 1973, Helwig Schmidt-Glintzer held an overseas scholarship from the German National Academic Foundation in Hsinchu, Taiwan at the Chinese Language Institute and a research fellow at the Academia Sinica in Taipei. He then spent approximately half a year as a research student at the Institute for Humanistic Studies (Jimbun kagaku kenyûshô) in Kyoto, Japan. In 1979, he habilitated for the subject of sinology at the Philosophical Faculty of the University of Bonn. In 1981, he was appointed full professor of East Asian Cultural and Linguistics at LMU Munich. At the end of October 1985 he participated as a special guest in the government delegation of the Foreign Minister of the Federal Republic of Germany in Beijing and Guangzhou.

In 1993, he was appointed as a professor at the University of Göttingen for East Asian Literature and Cultural Studies and the associated assumption of the post of director of the Herzog-August-Bibliothek Wolfenbüttel. His designated successor is Peter Burschel. Since April 2016 he has been senior professor and Director of China Centrum Tübingen (CCT).

Helwig Schmidt-Glintzer has been a full member of the Humanities Class of the Brunswick Scientific Society since 1999, a full member of the Academy of Sciences and Literature since 2002 and a corresponding member of the Philological-Historical Class of the Göttingen Academy of Sciences and Humanities since 2004.
