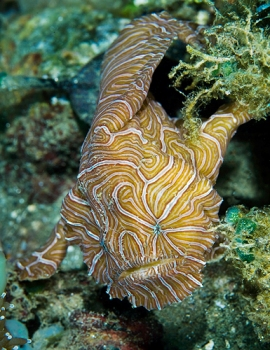
- Psychedelic frogfish (Histiophryne psychedelica)

Scientific classification
- Kingdom: Animalia
- Phylum: Chordata
- Class: Actinopterygii
- Division: Teleostei
- Order: Lophiiformes
- Family: Antennariidae
- Subfamily: Histiophryninae; Arnold & Pietsch, 2012
- Genus: Histiophryne; T. N. Gill, 1863

Type species
- * Chironectes bougainvilli Valenciennes, 1837

Synonyms
- Golem Whitley, 1957; Xenophrynichthys Schultz, 1957

= Histiophryne =

Genus of fishes

Histiophryne is a genus of marine ray-finned fishes, the only member of the subfamily Histiophryninae in the family Antennariidae, the frogfishes. These fishes are found in waters ranging from Taiwan to South Australia. There are currently five known species. These fishes are easily distinguished from other anglerfishes as having a reduced (or missing) luring appendage, a highly evolved form of the first dorsal fin spine.

== Taxonomy ==
Histiophryne was first proposed as a monospecific genus in 1863 by the American biologist Theodore Gill with Chironectes bougainvilli designated as its type species. C. bougainvilli was first formally described by the French zoologist Achille Valenciennes with its type locality given as "Indian seas". Some authorities classify this genus in the subfamily Histiophryninae within the family Antennariidae., while others recognise it as the family Histiophrynidae. However, the 5th edition of Fishes of the World does not recognise subfamilies within the Antennariidae, classifying the family within the suborder Antennarioidei within the order Lophiiformes, the anglerfishes.

Many other genera were previously placed in the Histiophryninae. However, phylogenetic studies in the 2020s found these to be better placed in their own subfamilies (primarily Rhycherinae), leaving Histiophryninae as a monotypic taxon containing just Histiophryne.

== Etymology ==
Histiophryne, combines histio, meaning "sail", an allusion the author of the name, Theodore Gill, did not explain but it may refer to the long soft-rayed dorsal fin which is connected to the caudal fin. The second part is phryne, which means "toad", a suffix commonly used in the names of anglerfish genera, dating back to Aristotle and Cicero, who called anglerfishes "fishing frogs" or sea frogs".

== Species ==
Histiophryne currently contains the following six recognised species:

- Histiophryne bougainvilli Valenciennes, 1837 (Smooth anglerfish)
- Histiophryne cryptacanthus M. C. W. Weber, 1913 (Cryptic anglerfish)
- Histiophryne maggiewalker R. J. Arnold & Pietsch, 2011 (Queensland frogfish) (Queensland frogfish)
- Histiophryne narungga R. J. Arnold & Pietsch, 2018 (Rodless anglerfish)
- Histiophryne pogonia R. J. Arnold, 2012
- Histiophryne psychedelica Pietsch, R. J. Arnold & D. J. Hall, 2009 (Psychedelic frogfish)

== Features ==
=== General Body Plan ===
Frogfishes have a short, spherical body that is laterally compressed. They have a large mouth that further enlarges when attacking prey. Their fins are similar to legs and are jointed. The ends of the anal and dorsal fins of Histiophryne spread past the bottom of the caudal fin and the tail is frequently curved against the body. Histiophryne have a swim bladder, 20 to 23 vertebrae, and can have raised bumps of skin on the body. They do not have an epural, pseudobranch, caudal peduncle, or dent between the second and third spines.

=== Dorsal Spines ===
Frogfishes have three developed spines on the top of their head. The second and third spines of organisms in the genus Histiophryne look like small bumps because they are attached to the surface of the head with skin. The first spine, the illicium, is found near the snout and is used by frogfish to lure prey. The spine ends with a fleshy tip called the esca. In Histiophryne, the size of the illicium is significantly smaller, frequently covered by skin, and not banded. The esca may be absent in some species of Histiophryne, including H. pogonius and H. psychedelica. If present, the esca is hard to differentiate it from the illicium due to its small size.

=== Dermal Spinules ===
The dermal spinules may or may not be present on species of the genus Histiophryne. If the spinules are present, they are very small and far apart from each other. The illicium does not have any dermal spinules.

== Movement ==
Frogfishes are sedentary creatures, preferring to wait for prey on the seafloor, but can use a few different methods to move around. They can walk along the seafloor with their pelvic and jointed pectoral fins as well as swim through the water. They have two fundamental walks which resemble the stride of tetrapods. Their ability to walk has been used as evidence for the evolution of fins to limbs within the ocean. When moving longer distances, the frogfish will swim using one of three methods: subcarangiform swimming, jet propulsion, or "kick-and-glide". In subcarangiform swimming, the frogfish will keep its fins close to its body and move the body and caudal fin in a back and forth motion. In jet propulsion, the frogfish will inhale a substantial amount of water into its mouth and push it out through its gills. This quick emission of water will move the frogfish forwards. In "kick-and-glide" swimming the frogfish will combine three methods of propulsion to quickly escape predators. The frogfish uses jet propulsion, moves the caudal fin three to five times, and moves the pectoral fins once. Then the frogfish glides by pressing its fins into the body.

== Feeding ==
Frogfishes camouflage with their surroundings and wait for prey to approach. Frogfishes use their lure to entice prey to come closer, however the illicium is too small in the genus Histiophryne to lure prey. If the prey – even one slightly larger than the frogfish – is close enough, the frogfish will enlarge its mouth and use suction feeding to swallow its prey in a matter of milliseconds. The frogfish will eat a wide variety of prey and is unselective when it comes to their diet. They have even been found to eat their own kind. The frogfish will reject the prey if it is too big or becomes stuck in its mouth.

== Reproduction ==
The genus Histiophryne has oval-shaped ovaries and lacks a larval stage. Offspring go through parental care and direct development, hatching as relatively large juveniles. The parents carry a small amount of large eggs in an egg cluster, which is held in a pocket. The parent wraps its tail around its body to form this pocket, which is found between the body, pectoral fin, and tail.

== Location ==
The genus Histiophryne is found in primarily shallow water within the Indo-Australian Archipelago. The genus is found in the waters surrounding Taiwan, the Philippines, the Maluku Islands, and the southern coast of Australia.
