= Alexander Morton (naturalist) =

Naturalist and museum curator (1854–1907)

Alexander Morton (11 September 1854 – 27 May 1907) was an American-born Australian naturalist and museum curator.

Morton was born in New Orleans, Louisiana, in 1854. His father, Thomas William Morton, was a planter and had emigrated to Queensland to take up the position of manager of the Manchester Queensland Cotton Co. While in Queensland, Thomas invested in a sugar plantation but died before it could realise a return leaving Alexander having to support himself and he went to work as a sailor. He was at sea for two years, working on vessels moving Melanesians to Queensland to work in the plantations and briefly visiting England and Europe before returning to Australia to study natural sciences.

In 1877 Morton took a position as a curator's assistant at the Australian Museum in Sydney and he joined the explorer Andrew Goldie on his expedition to New Guinea. Morton's specimens, mostly of birds collected in them forests in the vicinity of Port Moresby and from Yule Island, confirmed his abilities as a naturalist and the Museum sent him to Palmerston (now Darwin). In 1881, he travelled to the Solomon Islands and in 1882 he was on an expedition to explore the Burdekin and Mary rivers in Queensland and Lord Howe Island. When he resigned from his post at the Australian Museum, it kept him on as a field collector.

In 1884 he was appointed as curator of the Royal Society of Tasmania's Tasmanian Museum in Hobart and in 1885 when this became the Tasmanian Museum and Botanical Gardens he was reappointed as its curator, also becoming its secretary. He became the director of the museum and botanical gardens in January 1904 and was the secretary of the Royal Society of Tasmania from 1887 until his death. He also helped to establish the Queen Victoria Museum and Art Gallery in Launceston, Tasmania and was an honorary curator of that institution from 1891 up to 1896. Under Morton's stewardship the Museum expanded, adding art galleries as it grew. Morton also relabelled the exhibits using the classification system devised in the British Museum.

Morton had a number of other posts in Australian science including general secretary of the Australasian Association for the Advancement of Science. He continued to participate in expeditions.

Morton was a member of a Free Presbyterian Church of Scotland congregation and he married Caroline Eliza Mills in 1884, and together they had one son and three daughters, including Gwen Morton Spencer. He died of heart disease in 1907 at Sandy Bay at Whitminster Lodge private hospital. He was interred in Cornelian Bay Cemetery.

== Legacy ==
Morton had a number of species of fish named after him by fellow Australian naturalists, William John Macleay named three in 1883, but these have all now been synonymised.
