= Morrison Education Society School =

Morrison Education Society School (Chinese: 馬禮遜學堂), also called "Morrison Memorial School" or "Morrison School", was the first Western-style school and the first English-teaching institution in China. Founded in Macau in 1839, it moved to Hong Kong in 1842 and closed in 1849. Notable alumni of this school include Yung Wing, "Father of Chinese Students Studying Abroad"; Wong Shing, a journalist; and Wong Fun, a Western-trained doctor.

== History ==
In August 1834, Robert Morrison died in Guangzhou. In 1836, to commemorate the first Protestant missionary in China, the "Morrison Education Society" was established in the city. The society's object was “to improve and enhance education in China through school education and other means". Its school running history can be roughly divided into three periods as follows.

== Attached period ==
From 1835, the Morrison Education Society provided a monthly grant of £15 (or 312 yuan per year) to Mrs. Gutzlaff to establish a boys' school attached to the private girls' school in Macau that she sponsored. According to the 1837 annual report, when the school opened in September 1835, there were twelve girls and two boys: Yung Wing and Wei Guang. Wei Guang was an orphan abandoned by her father and brother and taken in by Reverend Bridgman. Clothes, stationery, meals, and everything else were free of charge for the students.

== Macau period ==
In May 1839, as Sino-British relations deteriorated, Mrs. Gutzlaff, a British citizen, was forced to close the girls' school. The original school building was rented to the Morrison Educational Society. In the same year, the "Morrison Education Society School" was officially founded on the former girl school site in Macau. Its first principal was Samuel Robbins Brown, an American missionary and Yale University graduate. Principal Brown and his wife moved into the small villa of the school, and the school started operation.

The class schedule was half a day for Chinese and half a day for English. The courses included Chinese, English, mathematics, religion, geography and history, moral education, and sports. The school system was three to four years. This was the first Western-style school and the first English-teaching institution in China. It initially enrolled five students, and in the following year Yung Wing joined in, making it six: Wong Shing, Li Kan, Chow Wan, Tong Chik, Wong Fun and Yung Wing.

== Hong Kong period ==
After the First Opium War, in November 1842, Morrison School moved to a purpose-built site on a hill (now called Morrison Hill) overlooking Victoria Harbour in Hong Kong.. That marked the beginning of Anglo-Chinese education in Hong Kong. Before the move, the number of students had increased to fifteen in Macau. Five of them were too young for their parents to agree for relocating to Hong Kong, so only ten boarding students continued their studies on the new campus. The courses included Chinese, English, mathematics, religion, geography, science, history, music, moral education and sports.

In December 1846, Brown left China on account of poor health. Students Wong Shing, Wong Fun and Yung Wing accompanied him to the United States for oversea study, on his return.

In 1849, the school closed as a result of financial difficulties. Another reason was that most of its graduates were more inclined to be government officials, opium traders and foreign firm compradors, instead of becoming missionaries according to the original object.

== Notable alumni ==
Totally about 50 students attended the Morrison School at different times. Notable alumni of this school include: Wei Guang, a prominent comprador in the late Qing Dynasty; Yung Wing, a figure of modern learning and the "Father of Chinese Students Studying Abroad"; Wong Shing, a journalist; Wong Fun, a Western-trained doctor; Li Gen, a journalist; Tang Tinggui, a comprador for Jardine Matheson, and his brother Tong King-Sing (one of the leading figures of the Self-Strengthening Movement); and Tang Tinggeng, a comprador for the China Merchants Steam Navigation Company.

== See also ==
- Education in China
- Education in Hong Kong
- Education in Macau
- Robert Morrison (missionary)
- Samuel Robbins Brown
- Ying Wa College
