= List of Chinese physicians =

== B ==
- Bian Que (扁鹊) (ca. 500 B.C.). – TCM physician

== C ==
- Buwei Yang Chao (1889–1981)
- Dr. Margaret Chan (陳馮富珍) – Current Director-General of the WHO (4 January 2007 – 30 June 2012)
- Chen Cheng – 陈承

== G ==
- Gao Yaojie (高耀洁医生)
- Ge Hong

== H ==
- Hua Tuo (华佗) (ca. 110–207). – TCM physician
- Dr. Kuan Huang (黄宽医生)
- Huangfu Mi (皇甫謐) (215–282 CE) – Expert in acupuncture

== J ==
- Ji Ben (吉本)( – 200)
- Jiang Yanyong (蒋彦永医生) 1931–

== L ==
- Li Shizhen (李时珍) (1518–1593) – TCM physician
- Lin Qiaozhi (林巧稚) – Gynecologist
- Liu Wansu (刘完素)

== M ==
- Ma Xiaonian (1945 – )

== N ==
- Ngeow Sze Chan (饒師泉) (1915–2002)

== S ==
- Sun Simiao (孙思邈) (581–682) – TCM physician
- Song Ci (宋慈) – Forensic expert

== T ==
- Tang Zonghai – early advocate for the integration of Chinese and Western medicine

== W ==
- Zhen-yi Wang
- Wong Fei Hung (黄飞鸿) (1847–1924) – TCM physician
- Wang Zhongcheng (王忠诚医生) – Neurosurgeon
- Charles Wang (王志伟)

== Z ==
- Zhang Zhongjing (张仲景) (150–219) – TCM physician
- Zhi Gang Sha 2002 Qigong Master of the Year
