= Chunyu (name) =

Name list

Chunyu or Chun-yu is a transliteration of multiple Chinese given names and a Chinese surname.

== Given name ==
- Chen Chun-yu (born 1975), Taiwanese politician
- Tan Kun-giok (1905–1963), Taiwanese songwriter and author known in Mandarin as Chen Chun-yu
- Dong Chunyu (born 1991), Chinese male soccer player
- Li Chunyu (born 1986), Chinese male soccer player
- Wang Chunyu (born 1995), Chinese female middle-distance runner
- Francis Ng Chun-yu (born 1961), Hong Kong actor
- Adderly Fong Chun-Yu (born 1990), Canadian racing driver

== Family name ==
- Chunyu (surname)
  - Chunyu Kun (4th century BC), Confucian philosopher and official
  - Chunyu Qiong (died 200), Chinese military general during the Han dynasty
  - Chunyu Shanshan (born 1967), Chinese actor
  - Chunyu Shi, administrator of Kuaiji during the Three Kingdoms
  - Chunyu Tiying, (fl. c. 174 BC), Western Han woman known for a folktale, and youngest daughter of Chunyu Yi
  - Chunyu Yan, (1st century BC), Han dynasty court official
  - Chunyu Yi, (fl. 216 BC- 150 BC), Western Han physician and bureaucrat
