= Issachar Jacox Roberts =

Southern Baptist missionary in Qing China (1802–1871)

Issachar Jacox Roberts (Chinese: 罗孝全 Luó Xiàoquán; February 17, 1802 – December 28, 1871) was a Southern Baptist missionary in Qing China notable for being in direct contact with Hong Xiuquan, leader of the Taiping Rebellion, and for denying him Christian baptism.

== Early life ==
Roberts was born in Sumner County, Tennessee, and graduated from Furman University, a Baptist school in Greenville, South Carolina.

== Significance ==
He was known for his erratic behaviour and "falling into difficulties with nearly everyone who worked with him", which cost him his connection with the Southern Baptist Convention. Roberts was the only Baptist known to have influenced Hong Xiuquan (洪秀全, Wade-Giles: Hung Hsiu-ch'üan), the Hakka who led the Taiping Rebellion (1851–1864) against the Qing Dynasty. Hong spent two months studying with Roberts at Canton (Guangzhou) in 1847. Roberts refused Hong's request for baptism. It is unclear why. The two men sent to investigate Hong reported nothing inappropriate or out of the ordinary. Hong completed the necessary statement of faith and purpose, as required for baptism in the Baptist faith, and Roberts found no reason to reject it. According to historian Jonathan D. Spence, it is possible that some Chinese converts, fearing that Hong might replace them and put them out of work, tricked Hong into asking for financial assistance, knowing that Roberts utterly despised people who convert in order to gain a job or stipend from missionaries.

He was also the first Baptist missionary, arriving in Hong Kong in February 1842.

== With the Taiping ==
In 1860, Roberts left Canton for the Taiping capital at Nanjing. He was dismayed to find that the beliefs of the Taiping departed widely from his own Christianity, but nevertheless accepted a post as advisor to Hong Rengan, foreign minister at the Taiping court. While there, Roberts arranged for some Baptists from the United States to visit Nanjing and meet Hong directly. He left in January 1862, on board the British gunboat Renard, following a dispute with Hong, accusing Hong of the murder of Issachar's servant, and was thereafter fiercely critical of the Taiping.

== Death ==
Roberts died of leprosy (which he had contracted in Macao in 1837) at the home of his niece in Upper Alton, Madison County, Illinois on December 28, 1871.

== Bibliography ==
- American Baptist Foreign Missionary Society Archives, Valley Forge, Pennsylvania, Issachar J. Roberts papers and correspondence
- Boardman, Eugene Powers, Christian Influence on the Ideology of the Taiping Rebellion, 1952
- Coughlin, Margaret Morgan, "Strangers in the House: J. Lewis Shuck and Issachar Roberts, First American Baptist Missionaries in China, Ph.D. dissertation, University of Virginia, 1972
- Pruden, George Blackburn Jr., "Issachar Jacox Roberts and American Diplomacy in China." Ph.D. dissertation, American University, 1977
- Rapp, John A., "Clashing Dilemmas: Hong Rengan, Issachar Roberts, and a Taiping "Murder" Mystery," Journal of Historical Biography 4 (Autumn 2008)
- Teng, Yuan Chung, "Reverend Issachar Jacox Roberts and the Taiping Rebellion," Journal of Asian Studies, 23, no. 1, (1963) 55–67.
- Zetzsche, Jost: «Gützlaffs Bedeutung für die protestantischen Bibelübersetzungen ins Chinesische», i Karl Gützlaff (1803-1851) und das Christentum in Ostasien, s. 155–171, red. av Thoralf Klein, Reinhard Zöllner. Collectana Serica. Nettetal: Monumenta Serica, 2005
- For a fictionalized account of Robert's activities in Nanking during the Taiping years see Tienkuo: The Heavenly Kingdom by "Li Bo" (Steven Leibo)
