= Anglo-Chinese College =

Anglo-Chinese College may refer to:

- Ying Wa College, Hong Kong (founded as Anglo-Chinese College in Malacca in 1818)
- Anglo-Chinese College (Fuzhou), Fuzhou, China
- Anglo-Chinese College (Shanghai), Shanghai
- Anglo-Chinese College, Shantou
- Anglo-Chinese College, Tianjin
- Anglo-Chinese College, Tinkling
- Anglo-Chinese College, Xiamen
