= Wong Shing =

Hong Kong and Chinese journalist, publisher and businessman

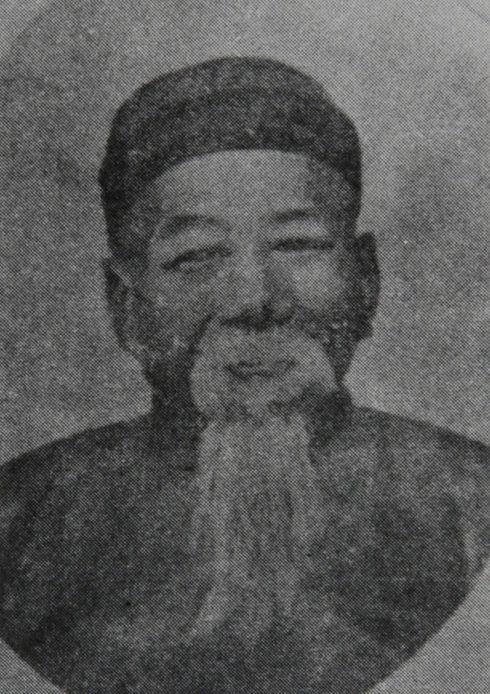

Unofficial Member of the Legislative Council of Hong Kong
- In office 28 February 1884 – 24 February 1890
- Appointed by: Sir George Bowen
- Succeeded by: Ho Kai

Personal details
- Born: 1825 Heungshan, Qing China
- Died: 5 August 1902 (aged 76–78) British Hong Kong
- Education: Morrison Educational Society School; Monson Academy
- Occupation: Journalist and businessman

Wong Shing, alias Wong Pin Po (1827 – 5 August 1902), was a Hong Kong and Chinese journalist, publisher, businessman and member of the Legislative Council of Hong Kong.

== Early life and education ==
Wong was born in a poor family in the Heungshan District of Guangdong Province. He entered the first class of the Morrison Educational Society School in Macao in 1841 with two other Chinese boys, Yung Wing and Wong Foon. They were later transferred to Hong Kong.

Wong became one of the first Chinese to study abroad when in 1847, Dr. Samuel Robbins Brown, an American teacher in the Morrison School, had to leave China due to his ill health. He offered to take a few of his old pupils back to the United States for further education. Yung Wing, Wong Foon, and Wong Shing signified their desire to go, and expenses for the three for two years were paid by Dr. Brown and the Morrison Education Society. They embarked at Whampoa on the ship Huntress and started the journey of more than three months during which they passed the Cape of Good Hope and proceeded to the United States. Upon their arrival, they were admitted to the Monson Academy at Monson, Massachusetts.

== Career ==
=== Journalistic career ===
As a result of ill health, Wong Shing did not manage to acquire any academic honours during his study in the United States and had to return to Hong Kong after two years. When he studied abroad he was baptised and became a member of the Chinese congregation of the London Missionary Society.

He worked for the China Mail owned and published by Andrew Shortrede for about two years after he returned from the United States. In 1864, Wong Shing published Daily General Price Current. He also served as an interpreter for the Hong Kong government. In 1853 he became the manager of the printing establishment of the Anglo-Chinese College operated by the London Mission under Dr. James Legge for some ten years. He was also the first Chinese name to appear on the Juror Lists in Hong Kong in 1858.

=== Chinese foreign ministry ===
He left Hong Kong to join the staff of the Chinese Government School being established in Shanghai to teach foreign languages to Chinese students for a short period of time and returned to Hong Kong and resumed the management of the Mission press.

In 1872 Wong was offered an appointment in the Tsung Li Yamen in Peking, to set up a printing office with moveable type for the foreign ministry. He served with Viceroy Li Hung-chang and Marquis Tseng Chi-tze and was a member of the Chinese legation staff in Washington. During his service at the Qing government, Wong took the second group of students in Yung Wing's Educational Mission scheme to the United States.

=== Return to Hong Kong ===
After his retirement from the Chinese diplomatic service, he became a prominent merchant and property owner in Hong Kong. He was praised being frugal. He bought land in Hong Kong before it increased ten times in value. Although he had the opportunity to raise rent, he did not do so. He was also a member of the organising committee for the Tung Wah Hospital and founding director when it was opened in 1870.

Wong was naturalised in December 1883 and became the second Chinese to be appointed to the Legislative Council of Hong Kong in 1884 after Ng Choy. He was described as a man of property, much-travelled, speaking good English and fully qualified to "look at Chinese affairs with English eyes and at English affairs with Chinese eyes." He was also noted for his cooperative attitude towards the colonial government's policies. When his six-year term expired in 1890, he asked not to be reappointed. He was succeeded by Dr. Ho Kai.

== Death and family ==
He died on 5 August 1902 evening at his residence No. 55, Peel Street. His remains were transferred to the steamer Heungshan, and conveyed to the burying ground of his ancestors at Heungshan. His coffin was escorted by a police sergeant and four Sikhs.

Wong was among the first Chinese to send their children abroad for education. One of his sons was educated at a university in Scotland, one worked as a civil servant at the Registrar General's office, another worked in the Hongkong and Shanghai Banking Corporation. Other members of family were also in government service. A daughter of Wong Shing married to Wei Yuk, later Sir Boshan Wei Yuk who became a prominent businessman and member of the Legislative Council.

Legislative Council of Hong Kong
Preceded by Ng Choy	Chinese Unofficial Member; 1884–1890	Succeeded by Ho Kai
Preceded by Ng Choy	Senior Chinese Unofficial Member; 1884–1890	Succeeded by Ho Kai
