= Hong Rengan =

Taiping Heavenly Kingdom official (1822–1864)

Hong Rengan 洪仁玕
- Shield King (干王)

Shield King of the Heavenly Kingdom
- Reign: 1859–1864
- Heavenly King: Hong Xiuquan; Hong Tianguifu
- Born: 20 February 1822; Hua County, Guangdong, Qing China
- Died: November 23, 1864 (aged 42); Nanchang, Jiangxi
Regnal name
- 九門御林開朝精忠軍師頂天扶朝綱干王賜福千歲同八千歲
- Military career
- Allegiance: Taiping Heavenly Kingdom
- Commands: Taiping army
- Conflicts: Taiping Rebellion: Battle of Jiangnan (1860); Battle of Nanjing (1864)

Chinese name
- Chinese: 洪仁玕
Transcriptions
Standard Mandarin
- Hanyu Pinyin: Hóng Réngān
- Wade–Giles: Hung^{4} Jen^{2}-kan^{1}
Wu
- Wugniu: Ghon^{6} Gnin^{2}-kae^{1}
Hakka
- Pha̍k-fa-sṳ: Fùng yìn-kon
Yue: Cantonese
- Jyutping: Hung^{4} Jan^{4}-gon^{1}

Hong Rengan (Chinese: 洪仁玕; 20 February 1822 – 23 November 1864) was an important leader of the Taiping Rebellion. He was a distant cousin of the movement's founder and spiritual leader Hong Xiuquan. His position as the Gan Wang (干王, lit. "the Shield King") resembled the role of a prime minister. He is a noted figure in history because of the sweeping reforms attempted under his rule.

== Early life ==
Hong was born on 18 February 1822 and worked as a village teacher in Guanlubu Village, Hua County, Guangdong. Although educated, he was unable to pass the imperial examinations. He was among the first of Hong Xiuquan's converts. In 1847, he accompanied Hong Xiuquan on his trip to Guangzhou and briefly studied the Bible there with Hong Xiuquan and Issachar Jacox Roberts.

== In Hong Kong ==
During the early years of the rebellion, Hong was separated from the rebellion and had to flee to Hong Kong, where he met the Swedish missionary Theodore Hamberg and converted to Christianity. He helped with church work for the Basel Mission in Sheung Wan and learned much about Christianity. Hong provided Hamberg with important information on the Taiping rebellion, which Hamberg later used to write a book about the movement, The visions of Hung-Siu-tshuen, and origin of the Kwang-si insurrection, published in Hong Kong in 1854.

Hong also served as an assistant to James Legge, working on translations of Chinese classics into English, and on the Chinese Serial, the first Chinese language newspaper in Hong Kong. During this time he learned much about Western politics, economics, history, geography, astronomy and other sciences.

== With the Taiping ==
When Hong Xiuquan called for his cousin Hong Rengan to come to Nanjing to help him rule, the Taiping administration was entrenched in a bitter power dispute. The powerbase of the movement had largely become split between the devout Taiping religious followers in Nanjing and the generals commanding the armies outside the city.

James Legge did not want Hong Rengan to have anything to do with the rebels because he distrusted and condemned their beliefs. When James Legge left Hong Kong for England he gave strict injunctions to Hong Rengan to remain in Hong Kong and to not join the rebel forces.

However Hong Rengan ignored his injunction and left Hong Kong in the spring of 1858, other missionaries gave him money and promised him a stipend for his family. He disguised himself as a peddler on his way to Nanjing.

Before his arrival, a previous power struggle, sometimes known as the Tianjing incident, erupted into a battle that killed over 20,000 Nanjing residents and the East King Yang Xiuqing, who was up to that point more powerful than Hong Xiuquan himself. Hong Rengan finally arrived at Taiping's capital, Tianjing on 22 April 1859, it was in this environment that Hong Rengan was given the second most important position in the Taiping movement; only Hong Xiuquan himself was more powerful.

Hong Rengan was given this position because of his education, especially his knowledge of many aspects of Western politics, art and technology, acquired during his time in Hong Kong. He also came to Nanjing with a thoroughly Protestant mindset. This was in contrast to the largely Old Testament-dominated beliefs of the Taiping founders. Hong reformed the worship and prayer services into Protestant-style ceremonies. He also discouraged the use of the word "barbarian" to describe Westerners. These were a few of his early reforms.

However, most of Hong's energy was dedicated to centralizing the authority of Taiping administration and revitalizing its military successes. He advocated building railroads, gaining the support of Western powers, and building banks in the areas under Taiping rule. Because of his beliefs, Hong is sometimes noted as the first modern Chinese nationalist, and he was mentioned in early writings by both the Kuomintang and the Chinese Communist Party. These ideas, along with his clearly Protestant belief system, garnered the Taiping rebellion interest in Western circles. This interest would wane as Taiping troops moved closer to Shanghai and actively enforced their ban on opium within their realm.

Most of Hong Rengan's reforms were never implemented. Though he had shown strategic talent in the few campaigns he commanded, his ideas clashed with the pre-eminent military prince of the Taipings, Li Xiucheng. In a large mission to retake the upper Yangtze River, Li refused the orders of Hong and returned to Nanjing. The failure of this mission allowed Qing troops to mount a massive blockade of the Taiping area of control and eventually led to the collapse of the rebellion. Hong Rengan's rule was soon reduced to decrees endorsed by Hong Xiuquan, but they were never followed or enforced outside the city.

In 1864 Hong Xiuquan was found dead and the city of Nanjing soon fell to Qing forces. Hong Rengan and the other Taiping leaders fled the city and attempted to maintain their rule through the decrees of Hong Tianguifu, son of Hong Xiuquan. They were caught and sentenced to death. As seen in his confession before execution, Hong Rengan was the only prince of the Taiping rebellion to maintain his loyalty to the movement and never recant. He was executed in Nanchang (南昌), in Jiangxi, on 23 November 1864, shortly after the execution of the young Hong Tianguifu and Li Xiucheng.

== See also ==
- Issachar Jacox Roberts (1802–71), American missionary, teacher of Hong Xiuquan and adviser to Hong Rengan
- A New Treatise on Aids to Administration (1859)
