= Chunyu =

Chunyu may refer to:

- Chunyu (name), names of Chinese origin
- Chunyu (ward), administrative ward in Tanzania

== See also ==
- Chunyun
