= A New Treatise on Aids to Administration =

Book by Hong Rengan

- SC: 资政新篇
- TC: 資政新篇
- Author: Hong Rengan
- Country: Taiping Heavenly Kingdom
- Written in: 1859

A New Treatise on Aids to Administration or A New Treatise on Political Counsel (simplified Chinese: 资政新篇; traditional Chinese: 資政新篇), also called New Treatise on Government, was a pro-modernisation proposal written by Hong Rengan to Hong Xiuquan when he arrived in Tianjing in the ninth year of the Taiping Heavenly Kingdom (1859).

A New Treatise on Aids to Administration was a blueprint of modernization for the Taiping Heavenly Kingdom. In his book, Hong proposed a program for China's economic modernization, including the construction of railroads and ships, the establishment of banks, patents, currency, public welfare institutions and hospitals, and so forth.

Regarding the sources that contributed to Hong's book, many scholars have pointed out the influence of missionaries' Chinese newspapers and periodicals.

== Impact and evaluations ==
Some Chinese scholars described Hong's New Treatise on Government as "the first vision of the advanced Chinese to develop capitalism in China". However, one scholar argued that this conclusion did not correspond to historical facts. He said that although Hong knew something about the West, he was still an old-fashioned literatus (旧式文人) at heart and lacked the spirit of practical work, and the book he wrote lacked the possibility of practical operation, which could not save the Taiping Heavenly Kingdom or China.
