= Yuan Dehui =

19th-century Chinese interpreter

Yuan Dehui (Chinese: 袁德輝; pinyin: Yuán Déhuī) was a Chinese imperial interpreter. He is best known for translating sections of Emerich de Vattel's Le droit des gens ("The Law of Nations").

A native of Sichuan, Yuan Dehui studied Latin at the Roman Catholic School in Penang. Later, he also studied at the Anglo-Chinese College (英华书院) in Malacca between 1823 and 1827, shortly after it was founded by Robert Morrison. For several years he worked as a translator for the Court of Tributary Affairs (理藩院), being sent in 1838 to collect books of Western learning in Guangzhou. In 1839 he became Lin Zexu's (林则徐) assistant in charge of foreign affairs.

Lin requested a translation of Le droit des gens from Peter Parker, an American medical missionary, perhaps at Yuan's suggestion. Finding Parker's translation difficult to understand, however, Lin sought the help of Yuan Dehui. The result was Wanguo lüli (万国律例), later published in Wei Yuan's Hai guo tu zhi (海國圖志: "Illustrated Treatise on Maritime Countries") in 1847. The Vattel passage Lin Zexu commissioned to be translated were confined to the issues of how nations go to war and impose embargoes, blockades, and other hostile measures. They were influential in determining Lin's anti-opium policy and in the lead up to the First Opium War.

Yuan Dehui also translated Lin Zexu's notice banning the import of opium, as well as a letter to Queen Victoria.
