= Chinese Serial =

Hong Kong's first Chinese newspaper

- Cover of the first issue
- Type: Monthly newspaper
- Dimension: 12.1 cm x 19 cm
- Founded: 1 August 1853
- Ceased publication: May 1856
- Language: Chinese

Chinese Serial
- Traditional Chinese: 遐邇貫珍
- Simplified Chinese: 遐迩贯珍
Transcriptions
Standard Mandarin
- Hanyu Pinyin: xiáěrguànzhēn
Yue: Cantonese
- Yale Romanization: hàh yíh gun jān
- Jyutping: haa4 ji5 gun3 zan1

Chinese Serial was the first Chinese newspaper in Hong Kong. Founded in August 1853 and published by Anglo-Chinese College (now Ying Wa College) in binding-book style, it introduced Western history, geography and sciences to Chinese readers, as well as reporting the latest news in China and the West. The paper was written mainly in Chinese, although some stories were in English. It ceased publication after 32 (Note: April 1856 issue was not published due to schedule.) issues in May 1856.

The paper was also the second Chinese newspaper in China and the first Chinese newspaper to have ads.

== History ==
In 1807, the London Missionary Society sent Robert Morrison to China to learn the language and translate the Bible. September that year, Morrison arrived in Macau, becoming the first Protestant missionary to set foot in China. By late 1809, Morrison requested assistance, leading to the arrival of William Milne in Macau in July 1813. To escape political interference, Milne, his family, Chinese teachers, and the printer Liang Fa moved to Malacca in 1815. There, Milne founded the Chinese Monthly Magazine (察世俗每月統記傳) in August 1815, which is recognized as the earliest modern Chinese periodical.

In 1817, Walter Henry Medhurst arrived in Malacca and brought with him the printing press and his experience printing for the London Missionary Society. In 1818, Milne established Anglo-Chinese College as instructed by Morrison and became the founding president. After his death on 2 June 1822, Morrison took up the responsibilities while he is still in Guangzhou through mailings. A year later, Medhurst inherited Milne's will and continued publishing under the new title Monthly Magazine (特選撮要每月紀傳) in 1823. This publication ceased in 1826. In 1828, Samuel Kidd began publishing Universal Gazette (天下新聞). He studied in Anglo-Chinese College and became a Chinese teacher, and the president in 1828. The gazette ceased publication one year later, as Kidd's wife fell ill and they returned to Britain.

On 1 August 1834, Morrison died of liver disease. Before his death, he translated the Bible to Chinese and published his English-Chinese dictionary.

After the First Opium War, Anglo-Chinese College relocated to Hong Kong in 1843 with James Legge as the president. In 1853, Medhurst finished translating the New Testament and Old Testament. He was invited to Hong Kong and became the first editor-in-chief of the paper. On 1 August, the first issue published. As Medhurst returned to Shanghai, Charles Batten Hillier became the second editor-in-chief until his appointment to Siam (now Thailand) in early 1856. Legge became the third editor-in-chief, and the paper terminated not long after.

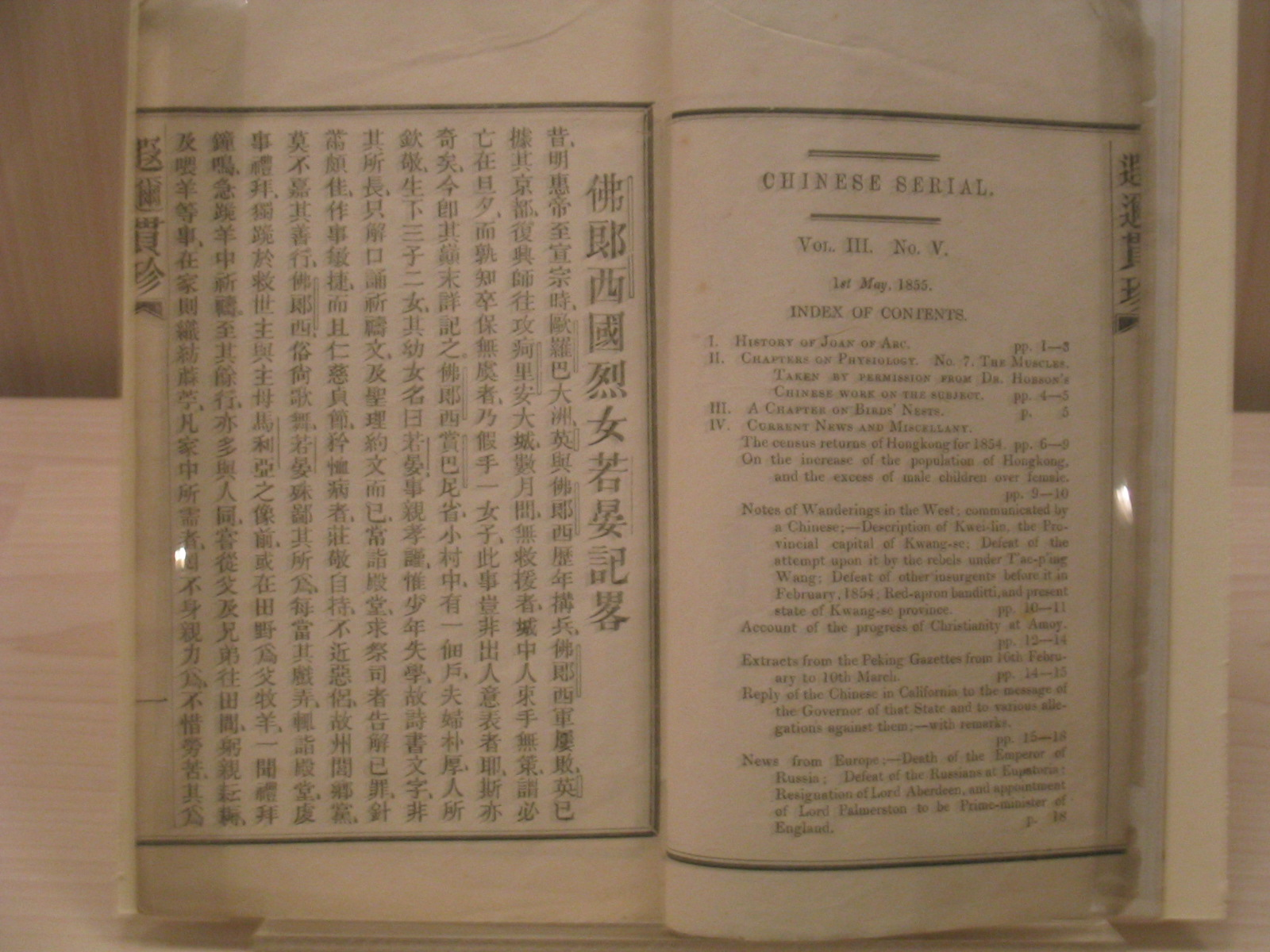
An issue of Chinese Serial featuring "History of Joan of Arc" in Hong Kong Museum of History

A complete facsimile edition of the paper was first published in 2004. (Japanese: ISBN 978-4873543840; Chinese translation: ISBN 978-7532618996)

== See also ==
- List of newspapers in Hong Kong

== Studies ==
- (in Japanese) 松浦章，內田慶市，沈国威，『遐邇貫珍の研究』，吹田市: 関西大学出版部，平成16 [2004]. (ISBN 978-4873543840)
