= Chunyu Yi =

Chinese physician (about 216–154 BC)

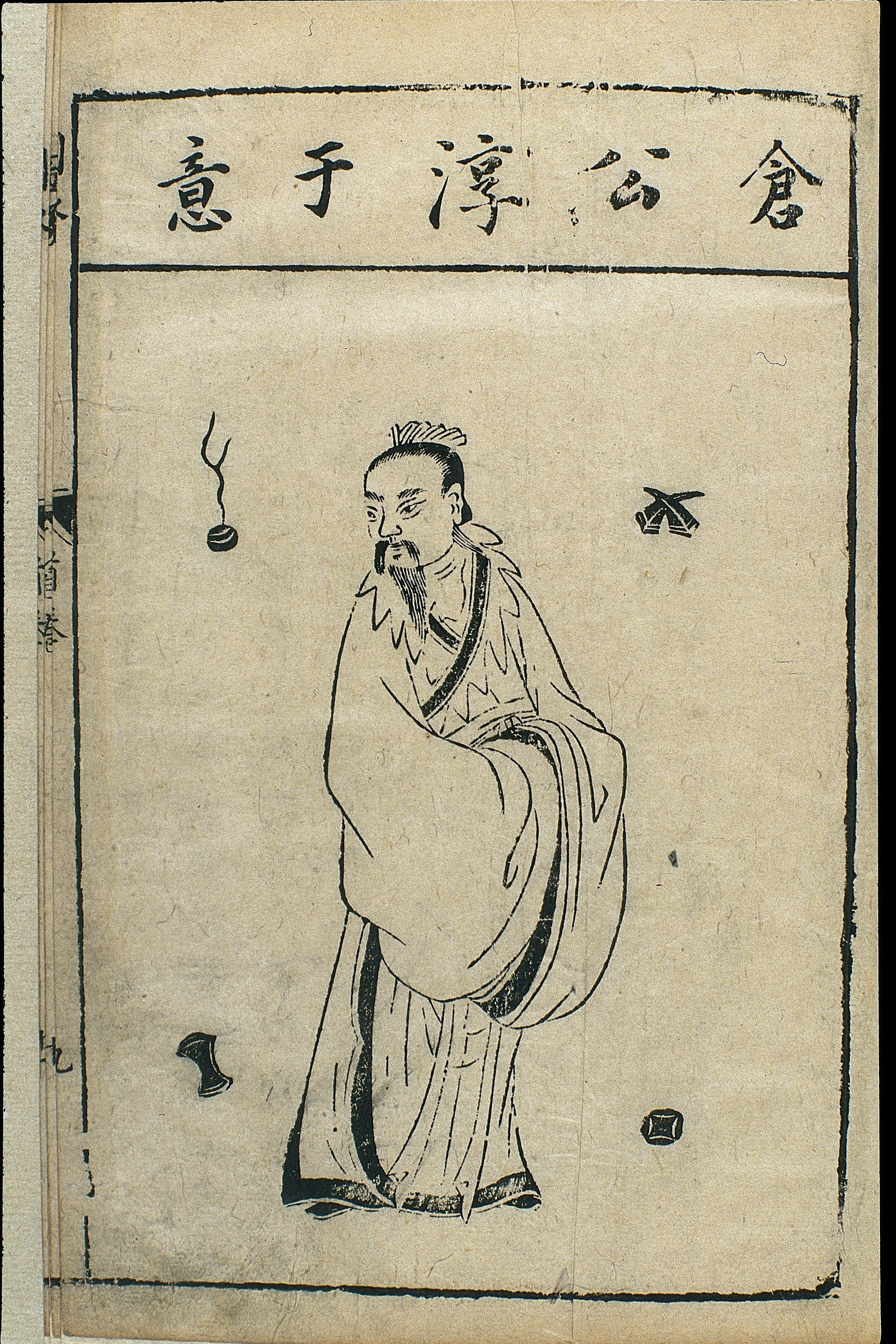
- Born: c. 205–215 BC
- Other names: Canggong (倉公)
- Occupations: Physician, granary official

Chunyu Yi
- Chinese: 淳于意
Transcriptions
Standard Mandarin
- Hanyu Pinyin: Chúnyú Yì
- IPA: [ʈʂʰwə̌n.y̌ î]

Chunyu Yi (Chinese: 淳于意) (Note: fl. 175 BC or 154 BC or 216 BC – 150 BC.) was a Chinese physician and bureaucrat active during the Western Han dynasty. A minor official in charge of a granary in Qi, he became renowned as a healer. He is noted as an early source of case histories.

== Career ==
Chunyu was born around 205 BC and 215 BC to a prominent land-owning family. According to biographer Sima Qian, writing in the 105th chapter of his Records of the Grand Historian, Chunyu was a minor official in charge of the granary in the state of Qi. In 180 BC, aged about 35, he began a career as a physician by studying the writings of legendary physician Bian Que while being mentored by both Gongsun Guang (公孫光) and Yang Zhongqian (杨中倩). Sima's biography of Chunyu also contains some 25 case histories. In diagnosing his patients, Chunyu, who reportedly could "tactually perceive" qi, had the custom of "explaining his observations in relation to authoritative texts". For instance, after observing a "hot reading from the lungs" of a man who had died "from an illness gotten from engaging in sexual intercourse while in a rage", Chunyu recalled the Maifa (脈法) or Model of the Pulse: "If the pulse is uneven but drumlike, the body will dissipate."

Chunyu's reputation as an adept healer earned him an audience with the King of Qi. At the same time, Chunyu habitually criticised the methods of his fellow physicians. He was also targeted by the relatives of "people whom he did not treat". Sometime between 176 and 167 BC, he was arrested for malpractice, on the grounds that he had refused to treat a certain patient, and sentenced to "certain punishment by mutilation". However, he was pardoned by Emperor Wen, following an impassioned appeal by Chunyu's youngest daughter, Tiying. After being released from prison, Chunyu wrote an autobiography, a medical treatise concerning etiology, diagnosis, and treatment, as well as several case histories which were subsequently included in Sima Qian's work. Little is known about Chunyu Yi's later years, apart from the fact that he had at least five students.

== Legacy ==
Early Chinese writers, including Sima Qian and Huangfu Mi, tended to present Chunyu as primarily a political figure whom they dubbed Canggong (倉公) or the "Granary Master", with little to no reference to his medical contributions. Sima described Chunyu as "secretive", while Huangfu Mi likened Chunyu Yi to another healer, Attendant He (醫和): "Their analyses captured root principles and thus they did far more than just examine the ill."

Although the Han dynasty was a watershed in the history of traditional Chinese medicine, few medical writings from the period are extant. Writing in the Mingyi lei'an (名醫類案) or Classified Cases from Famous Doctors (1549), Jiang Guan (江瓘) claims that Chunyu Yi was the "ancient founder of the case history tradition". Similarly, Vivienne Lo notes that Chunyu Yi was "an early exponent of the medicine of systematic correspondence that dominated intellectual medical traditions from the beginning of the Chinese empire through to modern times." According to Charles Buck, Chunyu's writings are thus "celebrated for the very rare insights they provide into clinical practice near the start of the Han." Elisabeth Hsu adds that Chunyu's work is "of similar importance to the history of medicine in China as did the Epidemics in the Hippocratic corpus to Greek medicine or the Ebers papyrus to Egyptian medicine."
