= Charles Wang (physician) =

Chinese physician and lawyer

Charles Wang (Chinese: 王志伟; pinyin: Wáng Zhìwěi) is a Chinese physician and lawyer.

Wang studied at Shanghai Jiao Tong University School of Medicine ('86), earned a master's degree in TCM at Shanghai University of Traditional Chinese Medicine ('88), and then worked as a resident and later as an endocrinologist and a specialist of Chinese medicine at Shanghai's Ruijin Hospital. In 1995, he left the medical field to study at the University of New Hampshire School of Law, earning an LL.M.

As a lawyer, Wang served as co-chairman of the Asia–Europe Foundation "Workshop of Copyright Trading for Book Publishers" in 2000, and in 2002, he was tasked with carrying out enforcement programs at the provincial level in China as part of an EU-China project on intellectual property protection. He was recognized by the Pudong district government in Shanghai for his legal work representing foreign-owned firms such as the Coca-Cola Pacific Group. He served as the general counsel for Beijing Olympic Broadcasting, which produced international feeds for the 2008 Summer Olympics and the 2008 Summer Paralympics.

Wang served as a panelist for the Asia-Europe Foundation's programs for pandemic preparedness in 2012. Since 2013 he has served as the primary physician for the China operations of Lufthansa, the German airline.

In 2000, Wang was named a "Personnalité d’Avenir" (Personality of the Future) by the French Foreign Ministry, and in 2015 he was featured in a CCTV International French special entitled "China-France: 50 Witnesses in 50 Years" — celebrating the 50th anniversary of China-France diplomatic relationship. The program aired on France's TV5Monde.

In 2012, Wang opened the WZW Medical Clinic in Shanghai.

== See also ==
- List of Chinese physicians
