= Yeung Po-kwan =

Hong Kong educator and politician (born 1939)

Yeung Po-kwan OBE CPM JP
- 楊寶坤

Member of the Legislative Council
- In office 27 September 1983 – 25 August 1988
- Appointed by: Sir Edward Youde

Personal details
- Born: 1939 (age 86–87) Hong Kong
- Education: Ying Wa College; Diocesan Boys' School; University of Hong Kong (BA); Chinese University of Hong Kong (Dip Ed); Moray House College of Education
- Occupation: School principal

Yeung Po-kwan (Chinese: 楊寶坤; born 1939) is a school principal and politician in Hong Kong.

He studied at the Ying Wa College and Diocesan Boys' School and attended the University of Hong Kong. He later received the Diploma of Education and the Certificate in Educational Management and Administration from the Chinese University of Hong Kong and Moray House College of Education in at the University of Edinburgh respectively. He was the principal of the Kung Lee College, Ming Yin College and Ying Wa College from 1990 to 2003.

He is also the Incorporated Phonographic Society, British Institute of Management and Royal Society of Arts and the member of the Institute of Linguists.

Yeung was appointed to the Legislative Council in 1983 by Governor Edward Youde.
