= Tomb of Bian Que (Jinan) =

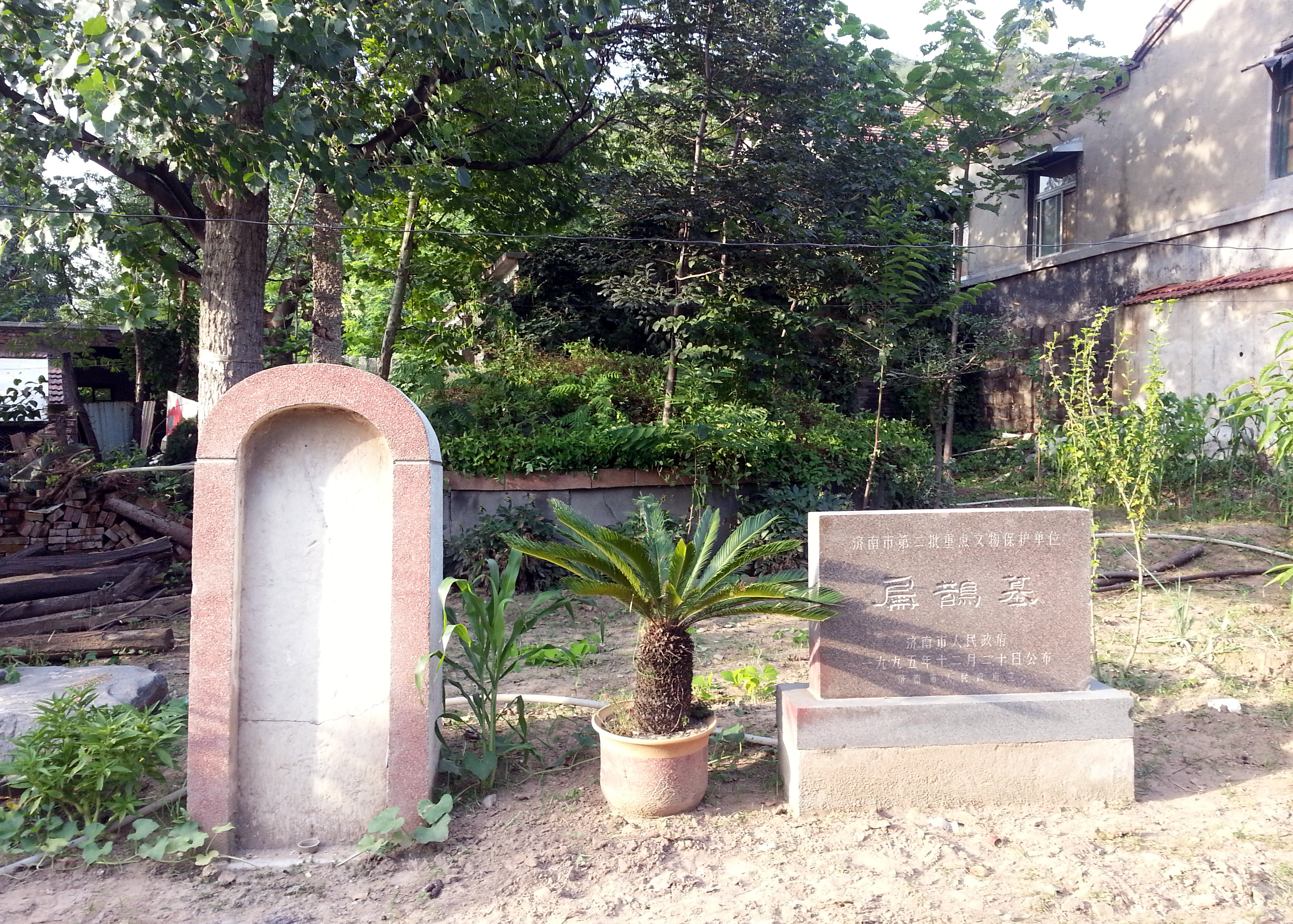
The tomb in August 2013.

The Tomb of Bian Que (Chinese: 扁鹊墓; pinyin: Biǎn Què Mù) is a monument to the mythical Chinese physician Bian Que located in the city of Jinan, Shandong, China on the foot of Que Hill. The tomb consists of a burial mound that stands about one metre tall and has a flat top consisting of loose soil framed by a ring of stone slabs. In front of the burial mount stands a stela inscribed in 1753.

Other tombs dedicated to Bian Que can be found in Hebei, Henan, and Shanxi.

== See also ==
- List of sites in Jinan
