= Ying Wa College =

Boys' secondary school in Kowloon, Hong Kong

- 英華書院

Location
- 1 Ying Wa Street; Sham Shui Po; Kowloon; Hong Kong; 22°19′48.296″N 114°09′9.05″E

Information
- Type: DSS, grant school
- Motto: 篤信善行 (Steadfast faith, beneficent deeds)
- Religious affiliation: Hong Kong Council of the Church of Christ in China (Protestantism)
- Established: 11 November 1818; 207 years ago
- Founder: Robert Morrison (London Missionary Society)
- President: Prof. Chan Ying-shing
- Chairperson: Rev. Chan Chi-kin
- Principal: Dion Chen
- Chaplain: Rev. Yap See-kiang
- Staff: 76
- Grades: F.1 – F.6
- Gender: Boys
- Enrollment: 1200
- Campus size: 13,000 square metres
- Colours: Red and green
- Song: Home of Our Youth
- Newspaper: "Torch" (Chinese: 火炬)
- Website: www.yingwa.edu.hk

Ying Wa College (YWC, Chinese: 英華書院) is a directly subsidised boys' secondary school in Kowloon, Hong Kong. It was established in 1818 in Malacca as the Anglo-Chinese College by Robert Morrison, the first Protestant missionary to China, before being relocated to Hong Kong in 1843. With over 200 years of history, it is the oldest school in Hong Kong.

The College Deed, signed in 1821, outlined the school's mission as the reciprocal cultivation of English and Chinese literature as well as the diffusion of Christianity (促進中西方學術交流，並廣傳基督福音).

== History ==
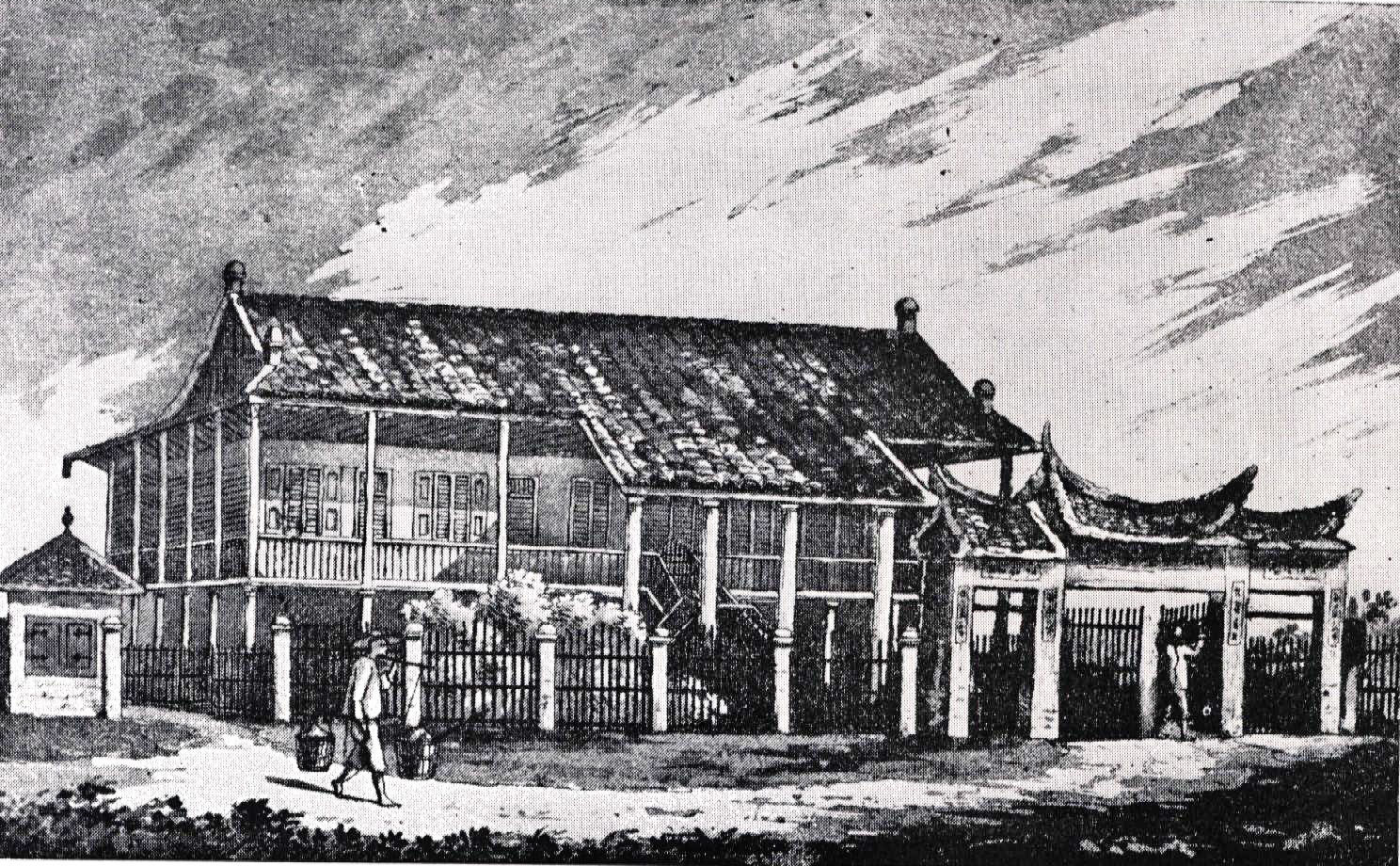
The college in Malacca, Malaya (Malaysia) in 1834

The original college campus was located in Malacca, Malaya (Malaysia).

=== Foundation ===
The college's founder, Robert Morrison of the London Missionary Society, arrived in China in 1807 to begin his work of evangelisation. He planned to establish a school that would allow Western missionaries to learn Oriental cultures and languages, playing a role in introducing the East to the West and vice versa. He hoped to mediate between the two and thus to pave way for the quiet and peaceful dissemination of Christian thought in China. With the help of William Milne, who joined Morrison in 1813, the Anglo-Chinese College was established in 1818 in Malacca with Milne as the first headmaster. Even with Milne at its head, Morrison maintained a strong role in leading and fundraising for the school, and was a committed teacher.

=== Early period (1818–1858) ===
Apart from its work as a school, the college also trained evangelists and pastors. Amongst them, former student Hoh Fuk Tong (何福堂) was made pastor in 1846. He preached in Foshan and Canton to his fellow Chinese people. Liang Fa (also known as Leung Faat), who was a craftsman in the printing centre of the college, also heeded the call to preach Gospel.

A printing press was set up within the school premises to publish the Chinese Bible and other Chinese Christian tracts and publications, well before China was opened by the Opium Wars. In 1853, the first Chinese newspaper, Chinese Serial, was published by the college's printing press.

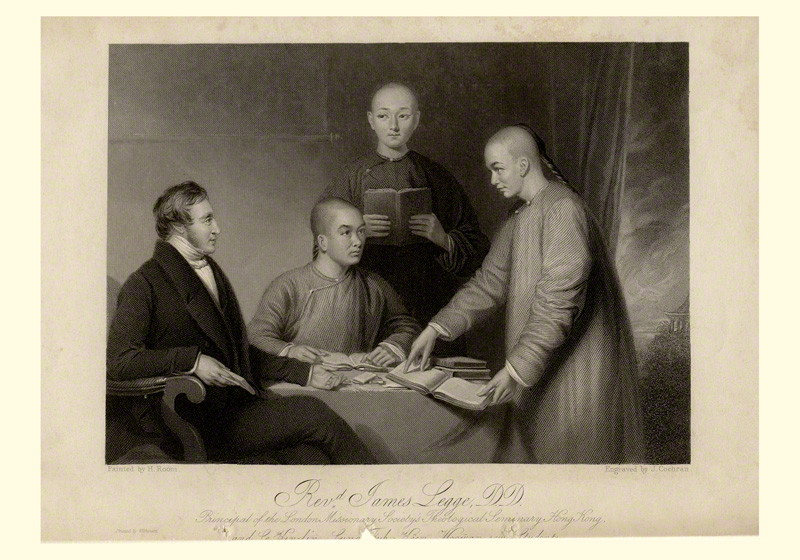
Legge and his three Chinese students

In 1840, James Legge became headmaster. Two years later, Hong Kong was ceded to the United Kingdom under the Treaty of Nanking. The London Missionary Society thus decided to move the college to Hong Kong in 1843. The school building was situated at the junction of Staunton Street and Aberdeen Street. At that time, Christian churches had not yet been officially established. Thus the college was used as a religious centre where Christians assembled to worship. Since the London Missionary Society deemed that the college should focus more on the training of evangelists after the relocation, the college was renamed "The Theological Seminary of the London Missionary Society in China." When Legge returned to Britain in 1846, he brought with him three of his Chinese students. Legge and the students were received by Queen Victoria.

Legge held his headship until he was appointed by the Hong Kong Government in 1864 to help prepare for the opening of Queen's College. Due to the lack of a successor as well as political instability, the college ceased to operate at the end of 1856 and teaching ended in 1858. But the printing press continued its work until 1870 when it was sold to Wang Tao and Wong Shing.

=== Restoration (1914–1929) ===
In 1911, the elders of the To Tsai Church together with Rev. Cheung Chuk Ling, Rev. W. T. Pearce and Rev. H. R. Wells revived the college so that the training of the sons of church members might be carried on. In 1913, the London Missionary Society responded to the appeal of the To Tsai Church. Rev. Arnold Hughes was sent to Hong Kong to assume headship, and the college was re-opened as a middle school in 1914 in rented premises, first at 9 Caine Road, later at 45 Caine Road, and finally at 82 Bonham Road (a former property of the German Rhenish Missionary).

The college grappled with many financial problems and it was at this time that help was received from the China Congregational Church. Financial assistance was also received from the Government.

In 1917, Hughes was called up for service in the First World War. Rev. W. T. Pearce became Acting Headmaster until Hughes returned after the war. The college suffered a great loss in 1922 when Hughes became ill and died in Japan while on his way back to England on sick leave. In that year, the London Missionary Society transferred Rev. L. G. Phillips from Amoy to Hong Kong. He served as Headmaster for over two years.

With Phillips's departure in 1924 and troubles in connection with the premises at 80 Bonham Road, the college entered another difficult period. The premises were rented from the government who now wanted to auction them off. The School Committee requested to be allowed to buy the property but there aroused a dispute with the Rhenish Mission even though the rental had originally been undertaken with a view to protecting the property and preserving it for the German mission. The committee contemplated closing the school, but eventually, the dispute was resolved and the college continued its operation under the headship of Richard Shum.

=== Expansion period (1929–1963) ===
In 1927, the college decided to build its own campus. Shum succeeded in raising over six thousand dollars from the staff and students. Together with fourteen thousand dollars from the Provident Fund and a government subvention of twenty thousand dollars, the School Committee decided to construct the new school building on the site of Mongkok Church at Bute Street in Mongkok, with the understanding that the college was to share its new hall with Mongkok Church. The government withdrew its financial aid when construction work was underway and the college was completed in September 1928 with the aid of some loans.

In 1930, Shum resigned and the London Missionary Society agreed to urgent appeals from the School Committee that Rev. Frank Short should be allowed to serve the college as Headmaster. Rev. Short administered and developed the college so well that it was restored to the Grant List. The extra funds thus gained made improvement in facilities possible. Rev. Frank Short continued in office until 1938 when he had to devote more time to the administrative work for the London Missionary Society. Herbert Noble, who taught in the college since 1933, succeeded Short.

In December 1941, Hong Kong fell into the control of the Imperial Japan. The school building itself, commandeered by the Japanese authorities, was used as a P.W.D. depot. Mr Noble, being a member of the naval volunteers, was taken a prisoner of war.

At the closure of the war, the school building was restored to the School Committee and the college was re-opened in November 1945. Noble convalesced in London and was temporarily substituted by the senior master Yung Kai-yin. When Noble resumed duty in 1946, the enrolment had increased to such an extent that around 600 students crammed into the building originally designed for 350. The college premises in Bute Street, Mongkok proved to be too small to operate an ideal school. A project for building a new school was therefore contemplated and negotiations resulted in the selling of the existing land and building to the Mongkok Church.

With a plot of land granted by the Government as the college site, the school authority started the construction of a new campus in 1B Oxford Road, Kowloon Tong. The construction work suffered repeated setbacks concerning its location, foundation and plan. It was only through the zealous efforts of Noble, who exhausted himself, and the magnanimity of the public, who made generous donations, that the project was realised in June 1962. In the same year, Mr Daniel P. K. Au officiated at the foundation ceremony. The new campus was opened by Sir Robert Black, the Governor of Hong Kong, in October 1963.

=== Oxford Road period (1963–2003) ===
The Oxford Road campus was situated in a tranquil neighbourhood with adequate facilities. It was also a highly regarded school zone with some of the top schools in Hong Kong situated there. The college has reached its first climax during this period. But Herbert Noble, after serving the college for 30 years, retired in 1964 on account of his poor health. He returned to England soon after retirement and died in December 1964. He was remembered for his dedicated service and remarkable contributions which helped enhance the prestige of the school. The College Hall, for both the Oxford Road and later the Sham Shui Po campuses, known as the Noble Hall, was named after Mr Noble.

On the other hand, Ying Wa Primary School was forced to close down due to lack of space of the new campus. It was not until 40 years later that the primary school division was re-established.

The London Missionary Society, the then sponsoring body of the college, merged with other missionaries to form the Council for World Mission. The sponsorship of the college was subsequently handed over to the Hong Kong Council of the Church of Christ in China. A board of directors was established. Terence Iles was appointed to succeed Noble as headmaster.

Iles was most active in organising various extracurricular activities, with a view to developing students' all-roundedness. He had established the house system, in which students were divided into different houses upon arrival to the school. This intensified the competitive spirit within inter-house competitions, such as the Swimming Galas and the Athletic Meets. Speech Day and Open Day were first held during Iles's headship. The college newspaper, Torch, was first published in 1964, making it the earliest school publication in Hong Kong. School teams joined various Hong Kong inter-school activities and competitions. In 1968, the school established its first Chinese Society to remind students of the importance of learning traditional Chinese culture in "the reciprocal cultivation of English and Chinese literature and the diffusion of Christianity".

In 1969, Iles admitted 15 girls to Form 6. This was controversial, but for some, a rather welcoming move.

After 8 years of devoted service, Iles resigned in 1972 and was succeeded by Mr Rex King. In addition to improving the school facilities, he also attended to pupils' application, which resulted in marked progress in academic work. His efforts in promoting Putonghua was pioneering. During his headship, the number of classes rose to 31 while the number of students reached around 1200. When King resigned in 1978, Mr Mui Ho-bun replaced him as headmaster. 12 years later, Mui retired in 1990. An old boy and former member of the Legislative Council, Mr. Yeung Po-kwan, took over the reins.

Yeung reintroduced the house system that was suspended for decades in 1991. He promoted the democratisation of school policies and established the Parent Teacher Association.

In 2000, the board of directors put in an application to the government for the construction of a millennium campus (aka Y2K campus) on a plot of reclaimed land in West Kowloon. It also decided to re-establish the primary school division and consequently joined the Through-train scheme with effect from September 2003. The new campus at Ying Wa Street was officially opened in July 2003. The Primary School also had its first intake in September 2003.

=== The Millennium (2003–present) ===
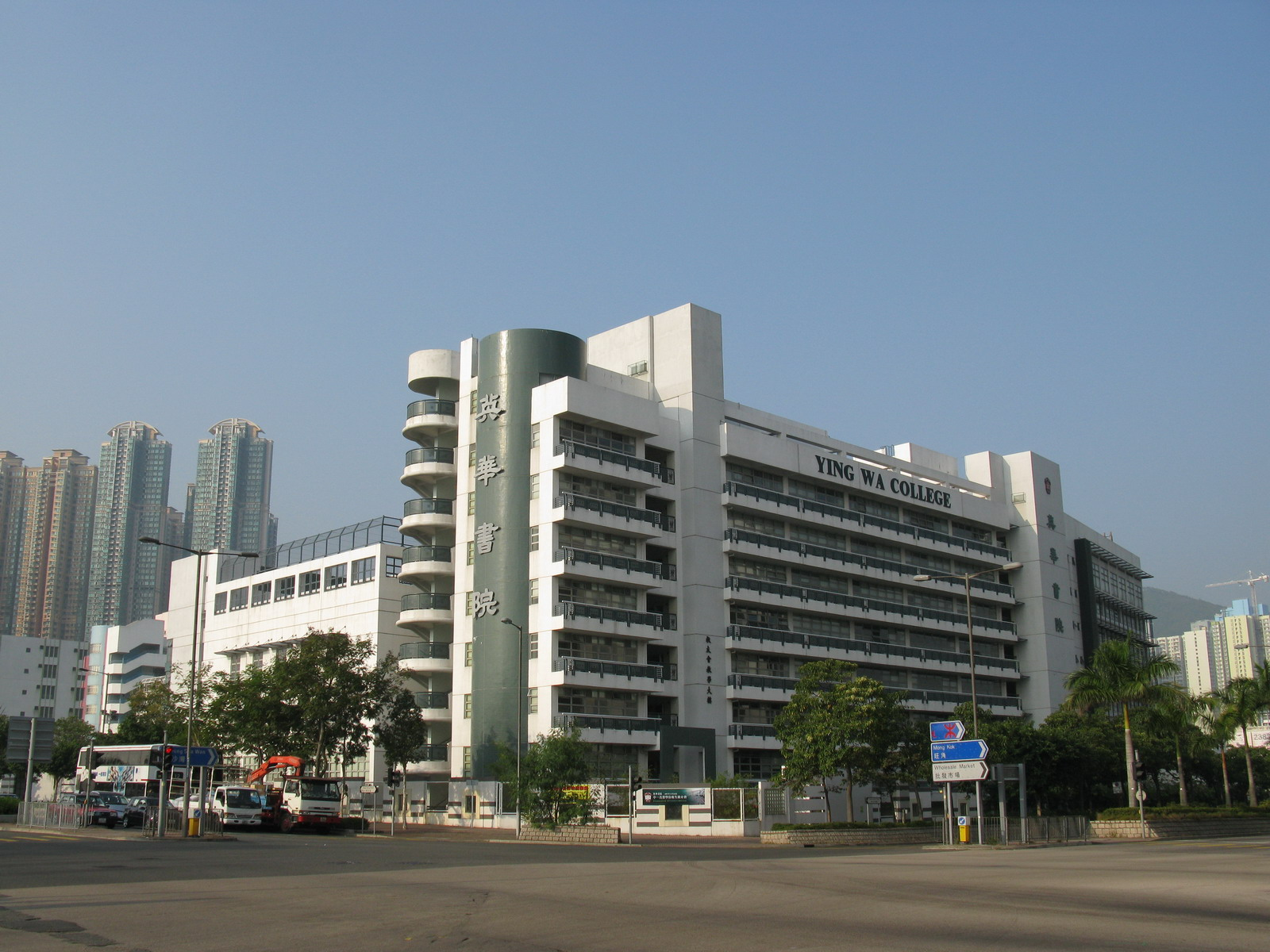
The millennium campus located in Sham Shui Po.

The relocation of the college was wildly debated within the school. Some feared that by withdrawing from the Kowloon Tong school zone, the standard of the college would be lowered. Others deemed that the Sham Shui Po District was far too distracting for the school to be set up there. But so far, it was proven that the new campus provided students with more space to engage in activities. Students also organised service projects to serve the neighbourhood, which was regarded as the poorest in Hong Kong.

Yeung stepped down in 2003 and was succeeded by Mr Roger Lee, an old boy of class 1979. Students were encouraged to join various kinds of activities and competitions and has won a lot of inter-school sports and music awards. In 2004, the handball team won the Inter-school Handball Competition for the tenth consecutive year.

The Ying Wa Heritage, a school museum, was established in 2005. Old artefacts and documents relating to the college were displayed, including a Bible published by the college back in the 19th century. Some of them were on display in an exhibition of the Hong Kong Museum of Education of the Hong Kong Institute of Education in 2012.

In March 2007, the board of directors decided to join the Direct Subsidy Scheme (DSS) with effect from September 2007, making it the ninth school in Hong Kong to join the DSS.

Roger Lee informed the students of his decision to leave the school in March 2011. Mr Allan Cheng, the Vice-Principal(Academic) and an old boy, served as the Acting Principal since September 2011.

On 11 November 2011, a celebration fun day for the 193rd anniversary of the college was held. It was the biggest anniversary celebration activity held since 2003.

On 23 November 2012, the Supervisor of the college confirmed that Cheng would become the Principal with effect from 1 January 2013, subject to final approval from the Education Bureau.

On 9 November 2018, Hong Kong Post issued a Stamp Sheetlet to celebrate the "Bicentenary of Ying Wa College." It features the College motto "Live the Mission, Brave the Course".

In February 2021, Didi Tang stated that in light of the imposition of the Hong Kong National Security Law, Ying Wa College "reportedly lost about 60 students in months."

== Roster of Heads ==
Tenure	Name	Portrait	Remarks
1818–1822	William Milne		The co-founder of the College with Rev. Robert Morrison, Dr William Milne made the college a base for evangelical work among Chinese people. He helped Morrison translate the Bible into Chinese and made a significant contribution to the publication of Biblical works and the spread of Western knowledge through journals (for example, The Chinese Magazine). Milne died of poor health in 1822.
1822–1824	James Humphreys		Rev. James Humphreys arrived in Malacca in 1821 and succeeded Milne as the principal of the college. After Malacca was ceded to Britain in 1825, he was appointed as a reverend in the Malay States. Humphreys later left the College and focused his efforts on evangelical work.
1824–1828	David Collie		Rev. David Collie, well known for his English translation of the Chinese Classic The Four Books, was a teacher and librarian of the College before being appointed to the position of principal. Collie died in 1828 on his way to Singapore for recuperation.
1828–1832	Samuel Kidd		A student of Morrison, Rev. S. Kidd joined the College in 1824 as a Chinese teacher. He returned to England because of poor health after serving as the principal of the college for 4 years. Kidd was appointed as the first professor of Chinese in England at University College in London in 1837.
1832–1834	Jacob Tomlin		An English and Chinese teacher, Rev. Tomlin succeeded Kidd as principal in 1832.
1834–1840	John Evans		Rev. John Evans was an outstanding scholar in Classical English Literature, Mathematics, Hebrew and Arabic. He took up the headship position of the college in 1834. Evans died of cholera in 1840.
1840–1858	James Legge		Rev. James Legge was a renowned Sinologist who studied under Rev. S. Kidd in London. Originally he was sent to China as a missionary in 1839, but he remained in Malacca for three years to take charge of the Anglo-Chinese School. After the first Anglo-Chinese War in 1842, he subsequently moved the college to Hong Kong and carried on the school's mission of evangelical work, education and publication. Being one of the most important nineteenth-century figures in the cultural exchange between China and the West, Legge was noted for his translations of The Four Books and Five Classics and many other volumes of Chinese classics, as well as his books on Chinese literature and religion. He also left his footprint in the promotion of Western education in Hong Kong by setting up the first government school of Hong Kong – The Central School. Legge resigned from Ying Wa College and returned to England in 1864. In 1875, Legge assumed the Chair of Chinese Language and Literature at Oxford University.
Suspension Period
1914–1918	Arnold Hughes		Rev. Arnold Hughes was commissioned by London Missionary Society as the principal of the revived Ying Wa College in 1914. During his time, the college moved its campus thrice mostly due to financial problems. Rev. Hughes took up his job with determination and perseverance and laid the foundation for the restoration of the college in. Unfortunately, due to tremendous hard work, Hughes became seriously ill and died in 1922 at the age of 34 while on his way back to report for duty.
1918–1919	W.T. Pearce (acting)		Served as acting headmaster when Rev. Hughes was called up to service in the First World War. He was also one of the key figures leading to the restoration of the College in 1914.
1919–1922	Arnold Hughes		The College was placed on the Grant List.
1922–1924	Gordon Phillips		Rev. Gordon Phillips was formerly a teacher of Anglo-Chinese School in Amoy before taking up the headship position of Ying Wa College in 1922. During his term, Ying Wa College was granted government subsidies and its financial hardship was eased temporarily. Phillips left Hong Kong and returned to Amoy two years later. Soon afterwards, Ying Wa College faced a property rights dispute with the German Rhenish Mission and the School Committee contemplated closing down the school.
1924–1930	Richard Shum		Shum was elected as principal in the midst of the property rights dispute over the school premises. Despite the cease of government funding, Shum gained financial assistance from various churches for the construction of a new school building in Kowloon. In 1928, the school moved to Bute Street, Mongkok. Claiming that he had completed his mission, Shum resigned and left the school in 1930.
1930–1938	Frank Short		Rev. Frank Short was a member of the School Board before he was appointed to the position of principal in 1930. He promoted a well-rounded school life among students with an emphasis on the development of sports and extra-curricular activities as well as academic excellence. The college also, for its first time, extended its admission to include primary students. Under Short's administration, the school developed so well that it was put back on the Government's Grant List. In 1938, Short resigned from Ying Wa College and took up the post of Secretary of the Biblical Society, South China.
1938–1964	Herbert Noble		Mr Herbert Noble was a Chemistry teacher at the college from 1933 onward and was recommended by Rev. Frank Short to be the principal in 1938. During the Japanese Occupation of Hong Kong in the midst of World War II, Noble was a prisoner of war and the school was closed. At the end of the war, Noble was released from Shamshuipo Concentration Camp. He convalesced in England for a few months, during which time Mr Yung Kai Yin acted as Deputy Principal. Noble resumed duty in 1946. Under his leadership, the school developed fast with an increasing number of students far exceeding the capacity of the school premises. Weathering numerous setbacks, the college was moved to Oxford Road, Kowloon Tong, in 1963. In the following year, Noble received an award of honour, O.B.E. (Order of the British Empire), from the Hong Kong Governor for his remarkable contributions to education in Hong Kong. After serving the college for 30 years, Noble retired in the summer of 1964 on account of his poor health. He returned to England soon after retirement and died December 1964.
1964–1972	Terence Iles		Mr Terence Iles was an energetic principal who was most active in organizing various extra-curricular activities for students. He introduced the House System, Swimming Gala and Fun Fair to the school and made his presence known at every important activity and inter-school competitions. In 1971, the college won the Omega Bowl in the Inter-school Sports Competition for the first time. He also made an unprecedented admission of 15 girls to the College in 1969.
1972–1978	Rex King		A New Zealander, Mr Rex F. King was the principal of Ming Yin College before serving Ying Wa College. He devoted his life and energy to the good of the school. In addition to improving the facilities of the school such as the library, lecture room, staff room, school hall, etc., he introduced Mandarin to the curriculum in 1972 and adopted the six-day cycle system. King joined the Hong Kong Examinations Authority after leaving the College.
1978–1990	Mui Ho-bun		Mui Ho-bun served the school as its principal for twelve years. He continued to improve the facilities of the school and devoted himself to the further improvement of academic achievement of the students.
1990–2003	Yeung Po-kwan		Former member of the Legislative Council of Hong Kong. He was named Justice of Peace in 1986. Yeung was the first old boy to become the Principal. He maintained a close relationship with the Old Boys’ Association and organized the Parent-Teacher Association in 1996.
2003–2011	Roger Lee		Old boy. The College was relocated to Sham Shui Po campus in 2003.
2011–2021	Allan Cheng		Old boy and a maths teacher.
2021–	Dion Chen		Former principal of YMCA of Hong Kong Christian College.

== House system ==
HOUSES	MASCOT
Hoh Fuk Tong (H)	eagle
Leung Faat (L)	buffalo
Milne (M)	unicorn
Morrison (O)	dragon
Noble (N)	lion

The house system was first introduced by Terence Iles during his headship in the 1960s. But it was later suspended and not until 1991 was it re-introduced by Yeung Po-kwan. The five houses, each with its own signature colour and mascot, commemorate five very important persons in the history of the school, namely Hoh Fuk Tong, Leung Faat, Milne, Morrison and Noble. The Houses, abbreviations, representative colours and mascots are as shown in the inset on the right.

Upon entering the Ying Wa College, new students are divided into five houses. The five houses compete every year in culture, music and athletics with a prize. The house with the highest overall score is awarded a trophy. Through this system, the competition encourages student excitement, achievement, school mate camaraderie and greater enthusiasm and school spirit. In the past, student was divided into houses according to their classes during secondary 1, i.e. students of the same class belonged to the same house. This policy has changed in recent years, where now there are members of the five houses in one class in secondary 1.

== School song, school hymn, school cry ==
=== School song ===
There are at least two school songs created since the establishment of Ying Wa College. The Ying Wa College Song (The British Grenadiers)(c.1914) and the current song "Home of Our Youth". The current song is written by Rupert Baldwin in 1938; it is also a figuration of the College, a symbol of the brotherhood of the students.

=== Home of Our Youth ===
Home of our youth
To thee we bring the homage of lives at the spring
Training thy sons for the game of life
Sending them forth to the age-long strife
Ready thy name ever-bright to uphold
Ready ’gainst evil, to fight and be bold
May those who left thee in years that are past
Guard well thy honour, to truth holding fast
Home of our youth,
To thee will we sing
Long may thy name on our lips proudly ring

=== School Hymn ===
The school hymn, "We build our School on Thee, O Lord" by Sebastian W. Meyer, is not used as frequently used as the school song; it is typically used in the Annual Speech Day amongst other ceremonious occasions. It is also used in some other schools in Hong Kong, including Sheng Kung Hui Lam Woo Memorial Secondary School, Sheng Kung Hui Tang Shiu Kin Secondary School, St. Paul's College and St Stephen's Girls' College.

=== School Cry ===
TWO, FOUR, SIX, EIGHT, WHAT DO WE APPRECIATE? YING WA! YING WA! WA! WA! WA!

The Ying Wa Cry is a mantra devised by former headmaster Mr Terence Iles for cheering purpose in inter-school sports events. Its use is not limited today, as students would chant spontaneously in various school events, like the swimming gala, the athletic meet and the school anniversary day.

There is a special tradition involving the Ying Wa Cry. Each time after the school song is sung (excluding formal events, e.g. events that take place in the Noble Hall), students would chant the cry continuously under the lead of one or more students, and the ceremony would end in a rumble of claps.

To lead the cry, one has to say (in Cantonese) "Ying Wa Boys: one, two, three..." (英華仔：一、二、三⋯⋯), and then the mass would follow "TWO, FOUR, SIX, EIGHT, WHAT DO WE APPRECIATE? YING WA! YING WA! WA! WA! WA!"

== Extracurricular activities ==
=== Student Council ===
Established in the 1960s, the College Student Council is responsible for organising various kinds of in-school and inter-school activities. The Council consists of ten cabinet members, sub-committee members and representatives of different student bodies, including the Prefects' Board, the Houses, the Music Union, the Sports Union, the school newspaper editorial board, as well as other clubs and societies.

==== The Cabinet ====
The Cabinet of the Council consists of ten members:

- President;
- Vice-President;
- Secretary for Internal Affairs;
- Secretary for External Affairs;
- Treasurer;
- Secretary for Culture;
- Secretary for Welfare;
- Secretary for Recreation;
- Secretary for Publicity;
- Secretary for General Affairs;

The election of the Council is usually held in October, in which members of the Cabinet are elected by the whole school, including teachers and students. If the Cabinet is not formed due to whatever reason, the previous Cabinet (i.e. that from last year) will continue their service until the end of the first term. This had happened twice, in 2019 and in 2024. The Inauguration of the members of the Student Council, as well as the Clubs and Societies, will be held after the election. They are required to read out the Oath of Office after the Headmaster.

Once the Cabinet is formed, the cabinet members are responsible for the function of the Council. They are assisted by a group of sub-committee members in organising different events, such as the Annual Christmas Ball, Ying Wa Premier League (YWPL) (football) matches, Ying Wa Basketball All-star (YWBA) (basketball) matches, celebrating events on the School Anniversary Day, etc.

==== The Nineteen Members' Board ====
The Nineteen Members' Board, known as the 'Big Nineteen' (or 十九大 ), consists of the ten members of the Cabinet as well as nine representatives of the student groups:

- Head Prefect - representing the Prefect Board
- House Captains (5 in total) – representing the five Houses
- Music Captain – representing the Music Union
- Sports Captain – representing the Sports Union
- Chief Editor of Torch (the school newspaper) – representing the editorial board

The Board is responsible for passing the proposal and the budget of the Cabinet.

== Notable alumni ==
- Andrew Cheung Kui-nung: Permanent Judge of the Court of Final Appeal; 4th chief judge of the High Court of Hong Kong (2011 - 2018).
- Hoh Fuk Tong: The first Chinese Reverend of the Protestant churches.
- Leung Faat
- Yuan Dehui
- Antony Leung
- Samuel Hui
- The Young Men
- Andrew Liao
- Woo Kwok-hing

== See also ==
- Education in Hong Kong
- List of secondary schools in Hong Kong
- Robert Morrison (missionary)
- Morrison Education Society School
- London Missionary Society
- The Hong Kong Council of the Church of Christ in China
