= James Legge =

Scottish missionary and translator (1815–1897)

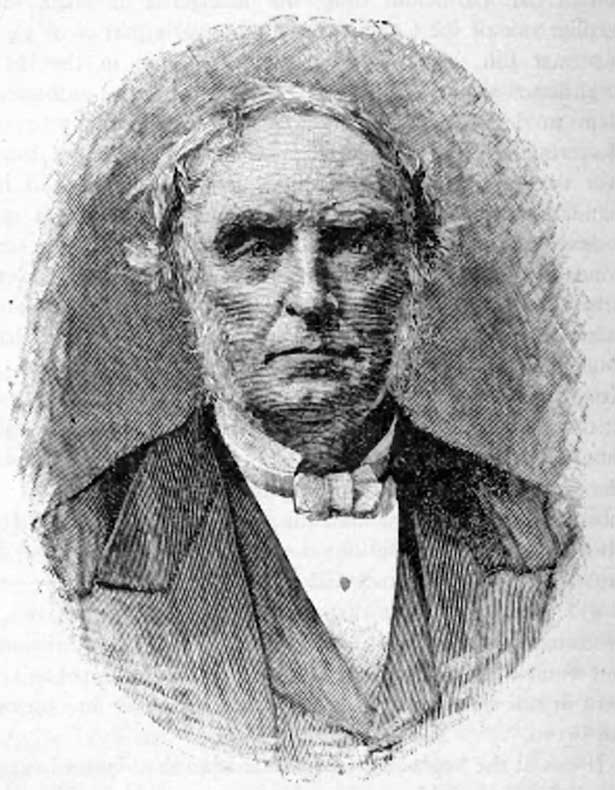
- Missionary to China
- Born: 20 December 1815; Huntly, Aberdeenshire, Scotland
- Died: 29 November 1897 (aged 81); Oxford, England
- Education: University of Aberdeen

Chinese name
- Chinese: 理雅各
Transcriptions
Standard Mandarin
- Hanyu Pinyin: Lǐ Yǎgè
Yue: Cantonese
- Yale Romanization: Léih Ngáah-gok

James Legge (/lɛɡ/; 20 December 1815 – 29 November 1897) was a Scottish linguist, missionary, sinologist, and translator who was best known as an early translator of Classical Chinese texts into English. Legge served as a representative of the London Missionary Society in Malacca and Hong Kong (1840–1873) and was the first Professor of Chinese at Oxford University (1876–1897). In association with Max Müller he prepared the monumental Sacred Books of the East series, published in 50 volumes between 1879 and 1891.

== Early life ==
James Legge was born at Huntly, Aberdeenshire. He enrolled in Aberdeen Grammar School at age 13 and then King's College, Aberdeen at age 15. He then continued his studies at Highbury Theological College, London.

== Mission to China and family ==
Legge went, in 1839, as a missionary to China, but first stayed at Malacca three years, in charge of the Anglo-Chinese College there. The College was subsequently moved to Hong Kong, where Legge lived for nearly thirty years. On 2 December 1843, Legge married Mary Isabella Morison (1816–1852), daughter of the Rev. John Morison, D.D. of Chelsea. The next year, she gave birth in Hong Kong to a son who lived for only a few hours. By her he also fathered Sir Thomas Morison Legge, the first Medical Inspector of Factories and Workshops in the UK. A Chinese Christian, Wat Ngong, accompanied Legge when he moved in 1844. He returned home to Huntly, Aberdeenshire, in 1846–7, taking with him three Chinese students. Legge and the students were received by Queen Victoria before his return to Hong Kong.

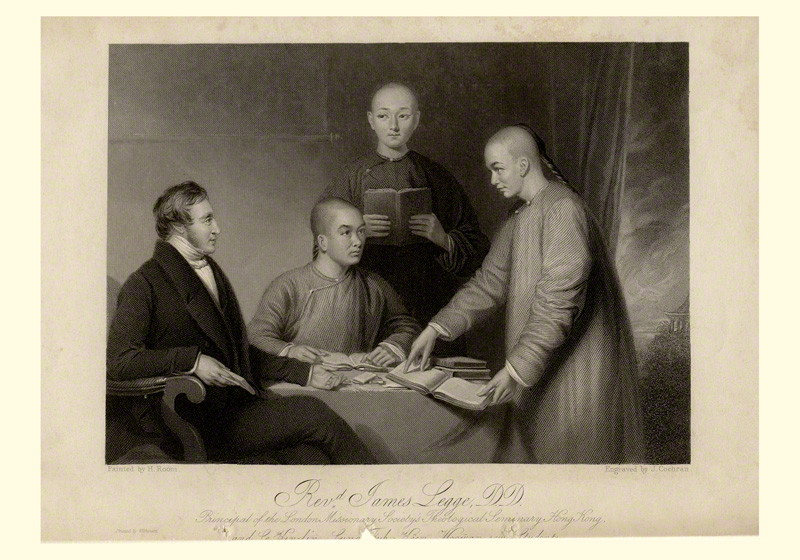
Legge and his three Chinese assistants

After Isabella died, he married secondly a widow, Hannah Mary Willetts née Johnstone (d. 1881).

=== Translating the classics ===
Convinced of the need for missionaries to be able to comprehend the ideas and culture of the Chinese, he began in 1841 a translation in many volumes of the Chinese classics, a monumental task that he completed a few years before his death. During his residence in Hong Kong, he translated Chinese classic literature into English with the help of Wang Tao and Hong Rengan, among others. He was appointed headmaster of Ying Wa College in Malacca in 1839 and continued in that position until 1867, the college having removed to Hong Kong in 1844. He was pastor of the Union Church in Hong Kong from 1844 to 1867.

He was third and final editor of the Chinese Serial, the first Chinese newspaper in Hong Kong. The paper closed in May 1856.

In 1867, Legge returned to Dollar in Clackmannanshire, Scotland, where he invited Wang Tao to join him, and received his LLD from the University of Aberdeen in 1870. While in Scotland, he also revisited his native burgh, Huntly, accompanied by Wang Tao. He then returned to Hong Kong as pastor at Union Church from 1870 to 1873. While in Hong Kong he published The She King (Classic of Poetry) in 1871 which according to Peter France is the first substantial volume of Chinese poetry in English translation still in use. The work underwent a new edition in 1876 in verse.

He took a long trip to North China, beginning 2 April 1873 in Shanghai, arriving at Tianjin by boat, then travelling by mule cart and arriving in Peking on 16 April 1873, where he stayed at the London Missionary Society headquarters. He visited the Great Wall, Ming Tombs and the Temple of Heaven, where he felt compelled to take off his shoes with holy awe. He left Peking, accompanied by Joseph Edkins, and headed for Shandong by mule cart to visit Jinan, Taishan, where they ascended the sacred Mount Tai, carried by four men on chairs. Leaving Mount Tai on 15 May, they visited Confucius Temple and the Forest of Confucius at Qufu, where he climbed to the top of Confucius' burial mound. Legge returned to Shanghai by way of the Grand Canal, and thence to England via Japan and the USA in 1873.

In addition to his other works Legge wrote The Life and Teaching of Confucius (1867); The Life and Teaching of Mencius (1875); The Religions of China (1880); and other books on Chinese literature and religion. His respect for Confucianism was controversial among his fellow missionaries.

=== Oxford professor ===
In 1875, he was named Fellow of Corpus Christi College, Oxford and in 1876 assumed the new Chair of Chinese Language and Literature at Oxford. As a Scottish nonconformist in the deeply Anglican university and city of Oxford, Legge was often treated as an outsider until his death.

At Oxford he attracted few students to his lectures but worked hard for some 20 years on his translations of the Chinese classics in his study at 3 Keble Terrace, later renumbered 3 Keble Road, which now has an Oxfordshire Blue Plaque in his memory. According to an anonymous contemporary obituary in the Pall Mall Gazette, Legge was in his study every morning at three o'clock, winter and summer, having retired to bed at ten. When he got up in the morning the first thing he did was to make himself a cup of tea over a spirit-lamp. Then he worked away at his translations while all the household slept.

In 1879, Legge was a member of a committee formed to create a women's college at Oxford "in which no distinction will be made between students on the ground of their belonging to different religious denominations". This resulted in the founding of Somerville Hall, later renamed Somerville College, one of the first two Oxford colleges for women.

While at Oxford, Legge was an ardent opponent of Britain's opium policy, and was a founding member of the Society for the Suppression of the Opium Trade in 1874.

Legge was given an honorary MA, University of Oxford, and LLD, University of Edinburgh, 1884. He was elected an International Member of the American Philosophical Society in 1895.

== Death and legacy ==
Legge died at Oxford in 1897 and is buried in Wolvercote Cemetery. The remains of his second wife Hannah, who died before him in 1881, were exhumed from Saint Sepulchre's cemetery and placed beside the body of her husband in Wolvercote. Most of his most important manuscripts and letters are archived at the School of Oriental and African Studies and, secondly, in the Bodleian Library.

Sinologist Chad Hansen credited Legge as "the incomparable father of all sinologists."

== Name for God in Bible translation ==
Initially, Legge followed the pattern set by Robert Morrison and preferred to translate the Christian God into Chinese using the word "Shen" (Chinese: 神; pinyin: shén; lit. 'deity', 'spirit'). However, he was increasingly convinced by his Chinese collaborators Hong Rengan and He Jinshan that "Shangdi" (Chinese: 上帝; pinyin: Shàngdì; Wade–Giles: Shang Ti; lit. 'High Emperor') from the Book of Documents and the Classic of Poetry was a more appropriate term. He also drew from his education in Scottish common sense realism various hermeneutical principles in translation. Ultimately, by the 1850s, Legge concluded that the word "Shangdi" represented a monotheistic god, and argued it was the most appropriate term for translating words in reference to the Christian God into Chinese. He believed that using a term already deeply entrenched in Chinese culture could prevent Christianity from being seen as a completely foreign religion. His opponents argued that this would cause confusion due to the word's use in Taoism and Chinese folk religion.

== Selected works ==
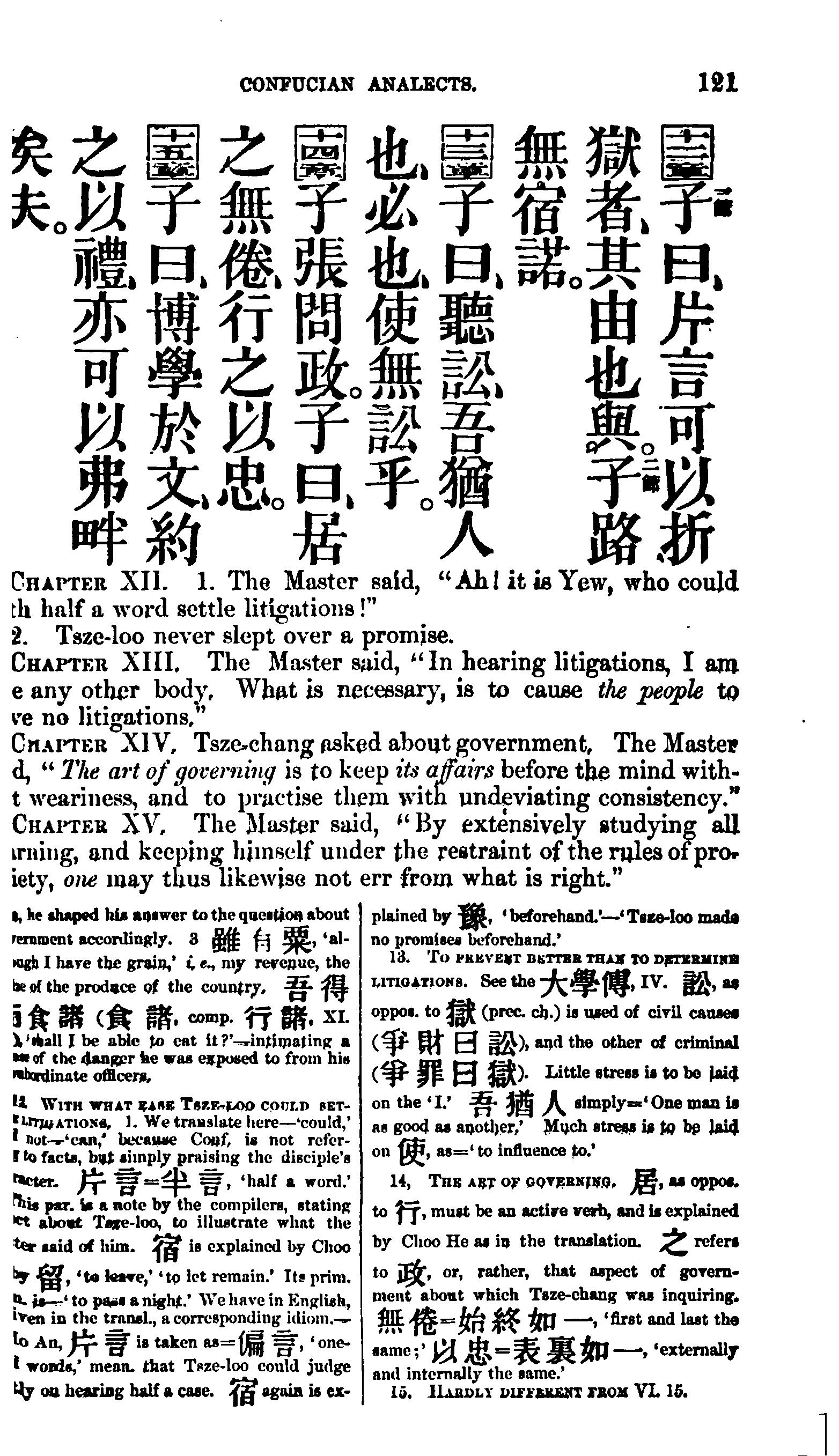
Page 121 from first edition of James Legge's translation of Confucius Analects

Legge's most enduring work has been The Chinese Classics: with a Translation, Critical and Exegetical Notes, Prolegomena, and Copious Indexes, 5 vols., (Hong Kong: Legge; London: Trubner, 1861–1872):

- Volume 1: Confucian Analects, the Great Learning, and the Doctrine of the Mean (1861). Revised second edition (1893), Oxford: Clarendon Press, reprinted by Cosimo in 2006 (ISBN 978-1-60520-643-1). The Confucian Analects
- Volume 2: The works of Mencius (1861), Revised second edition (1895), Oxford: Clarendon Press, reprinted by Dover Books in 1990 (ISBN 978-0-486-26375-5).
- Volume 3: The Shoo King (Book of Historical Documents) (1865):
  - Part 1: Prolegomena (with Bamboo Annals) and Chapters 1–36
  - Part 2: Chapters 37–58 and indexes
- Volume 4: The She king (Classic of Poetry) (1871)
  - Part 1: Prolegomena and first section
  - Part 2: Second, third and fourth sections
- Volume 5: The Ch'un ts'ew (Spring and Autumn Annals), with the Tso chuen (Commentary of Zuo) (1872)
  - Part 1: Books 1–8
  - Part 2: Books 9–12

These contain parallel Chinese and English text, with detailed notes, introductions and indexes. Chinese names are transcribed in Legge's own romanisation.

Legge originally planned his Chinese Classics as seven volumes, but his translations of the I Ching and Book of Rites (and several others) were instead included in the Sacred Books of the East series edited by Max Müller (Oxford: Clarendon Press):

- Volume 3: The Shû king (Book of Documents). The religious portions of the Shih king (Classic of Poetry). The Hsiâo king (Classic of Filial Piety). (1879)
- Volume 16: The Yî king (I Ching) (1882)
- The Lî Kî (Book of Rites) (1885), 2 vols.:
  - Volume 27: Chapters 1–10
  - Volume 28: Chapters 11–46
- The Texts of Taoism: The Tâo Teh King (Tao Te Ching); The Writings of Kwang-dze (Chuang Tzŭ) (1891), 2 vols.:
  - Volume 39: Tao Te Ching and Chuang Tzŭ books 1–17.
  - Volume 40: Chuang Tzŭ books 18–33 and shorter works: the Taishang Ganying Pian (Tractate of Actions and their Retributions), the Qingjing Jing (Classic of Purity), the Yinfujing (Classic of the Harmony of the Seen and Unseen), the Yushu Jing (Classic of the Pivot of Jade) and the Nei Riyong Jing (Classic of the Directory for the Day).

Other works:

- The religions of China: Confucianism and Tâoism described and compared with Christianity, London: Hodder and Stoughton, 1880.
- The Nestorian monument of Hsî-an Fû in Shen-hsî, China, London: Trübner & co., 1888; repr New York: Paragon Book, 1966, ISBN 978-0-8188-0062-7. (Contains Chinese-English parallel.)
