= Chunyu Yan =

Chinese court official during the Han Dynasty

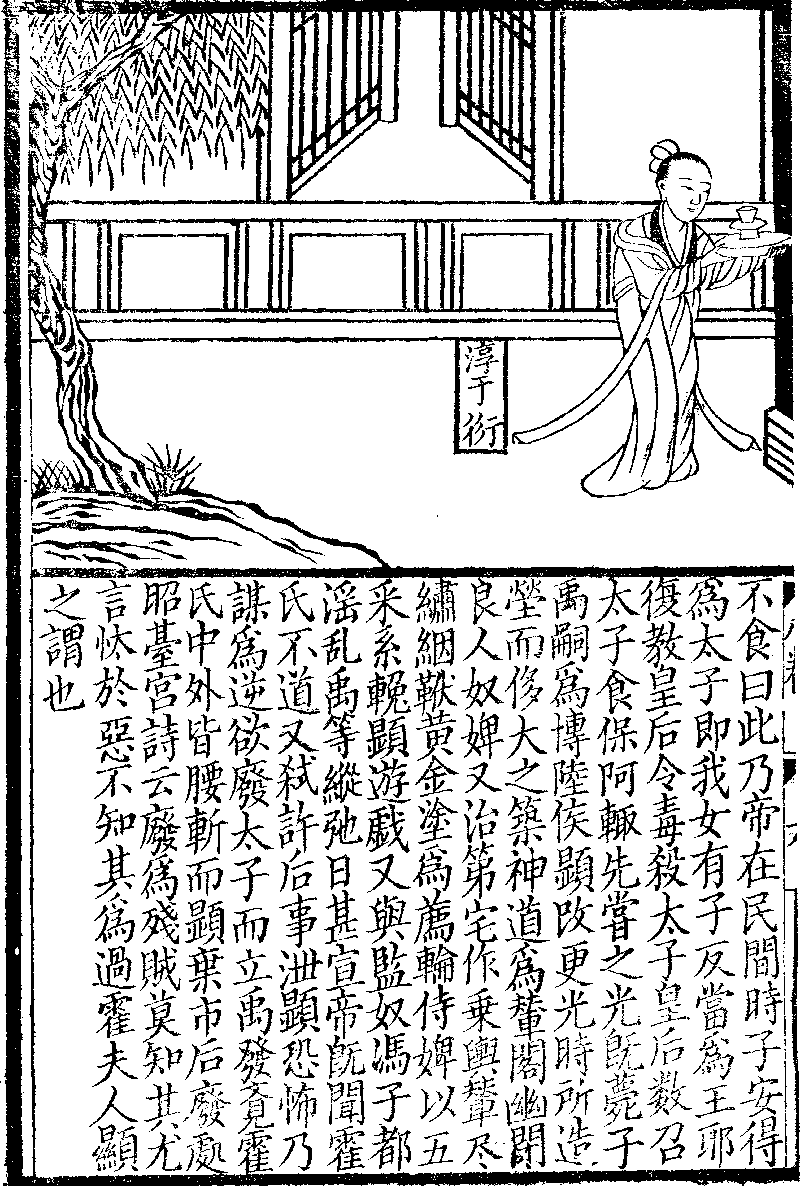
Chunyu Yan

Chunyu Yan (1st-century BC), (personal name Shaofu) was a Chinese court official during the Han Dynasty. She was the obstetrician and gynecologist of empress Xu Pingjun, the wife of emperor Xuan. She has been referred to as the perhaps first woman of her profession in China.

According to the History of the Western Han (Hanshu), in 71 BCE, Chun Yuyan was also responsible for the death of empress Xu. According to this history, while entering the palace to administer treatment to empress Xu, who was soon to give birth, Chunyu Yun spoke to her husband Shang, a door guard. Shang told her to speak to Huo Guang's wife, Huo Xian, and ask for Shang to be appointed a director of the salt wells of An.

Huo Xian (who wanted her daughter to become empress in place of Xu), saw an opportunity, and, in return for sharing wealth with Chunyu Yan and her family, she convinced Chunyu Yan to murder empress Xu. Huo Xian argued that the murder would be hard for anyone to detect, because dying in childbirth was so common. After thinking about it, Chunyu Yan agreed, and secretly mixed a medicine for the empress that contained a poison, aconite. When empress Xu took the poisoned medicine, she complained of feeling ill, and having a headache; Chun Yuyan calmly insisted this was normal, and gave the empress more of the supposed medicine. Soon thereafter, empress Xu died.

Afterwards, though she had been promised wealth, Chunyu Yan did not receive it, as Huo Xian was afraid to draw attention. Another chronicle, Diverse notes on the Western Capital (Xijing zaji) claims, however, that Xian gave Chunyu Yan many gifts. Eventually, all of the physicians who attended the empress while she was ill were accused of not giving her proper treatment, and were arrested and tried; Chunyu Yan was not given any sentence, nor singled out as being guilty.

It is unclear whether these claims of murder are historic truth, or simply extreme gossip.
