= Upper Alton Historic District =

Historic district in Illinois, United States

- U.S. National Register of Historic Places
- U.S. Historic district
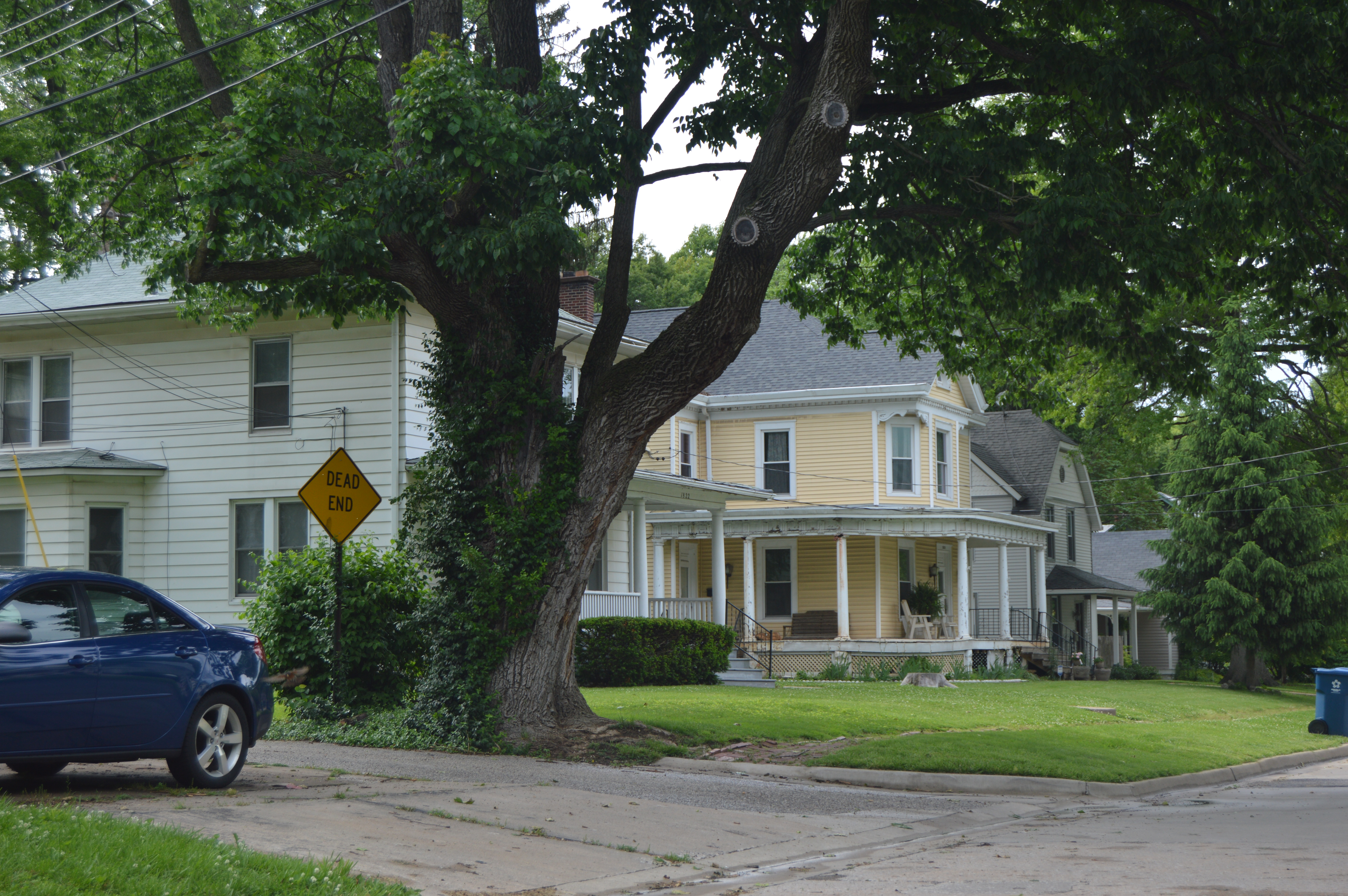
- Evergreen north of College

- Location within Illinois Location within the United States
- Location: Seminary St., College, Leverett, and Evergreen Aves., Alton, Illinois
- Coordinates: 38°54′17″N 90°8′34″W
- Area: 52 acres (21 ha)
- Architectural style: Classical Revival, Greek Revival, Queen Anne, Tudor Revival
- NRHP reference No.: 78001167
- Added to NRHP: May 2, 1978

The Upper Alton Historic District is a historic district located in northeast Alton, Illinois, in what was once the separate town of Upper Alton. The district includes the campuses of Shurtleff College and the Western Military Academy as well as the surrounding residential areas. Upper Alton was platted in 1817, but it did not grow significantly until the 1830s, when Shurtleff College opened; the college dominated the town for decades, and most of the houses around it were built for the school or its professors. The college's buildings were mainly designed in the Classical Revival and Greek Revival style, while the houses were designed in the Classical Revival and Queen Anne styles. In 1879, the Western Military Academy opened in the John Bostwick House; while the house burned in 1903, the academy rebuilt immediately and continued operations. The academy's campus is mainly designed in the Tudor Revival style. Shurtleff College closed in 1957 and is now the Southern Illinois University School of Dental Medicine; the Western Military Academy also closed in 1971.

The district was added to the National Register of Historic Places on May 2, 1978.
