= Samuel Kidd =

British Protestant missionary in Malacca

Samuel Kidd (1799–12 June 1843, Camden) was an English Protestant missionary in Malacca, and professor of Chinese at University College, London.

== Life ==
Born 22 November 1804 at Welton, near Kingston upon Hull, he was educated at the village school there. In 1818 he was sent to Hull, where he was drawn towards a missionary career, and in 1820 he entered the London Missionary Society's training college at Gosport.

At the end of April 1824 Kidd sailed for the London Missionary Society to Madras, and on to Malacca, where he arrived in November. He took up the Hokkien dialect of Chinese under the Rev. David Collie. In the course of 1826 he published short tracts in Chinese, and the following year was appointed professor of Chinese in the Anglo-Chinese College of Malacca. From this time he took an active part in missionary work, preaching and writing.

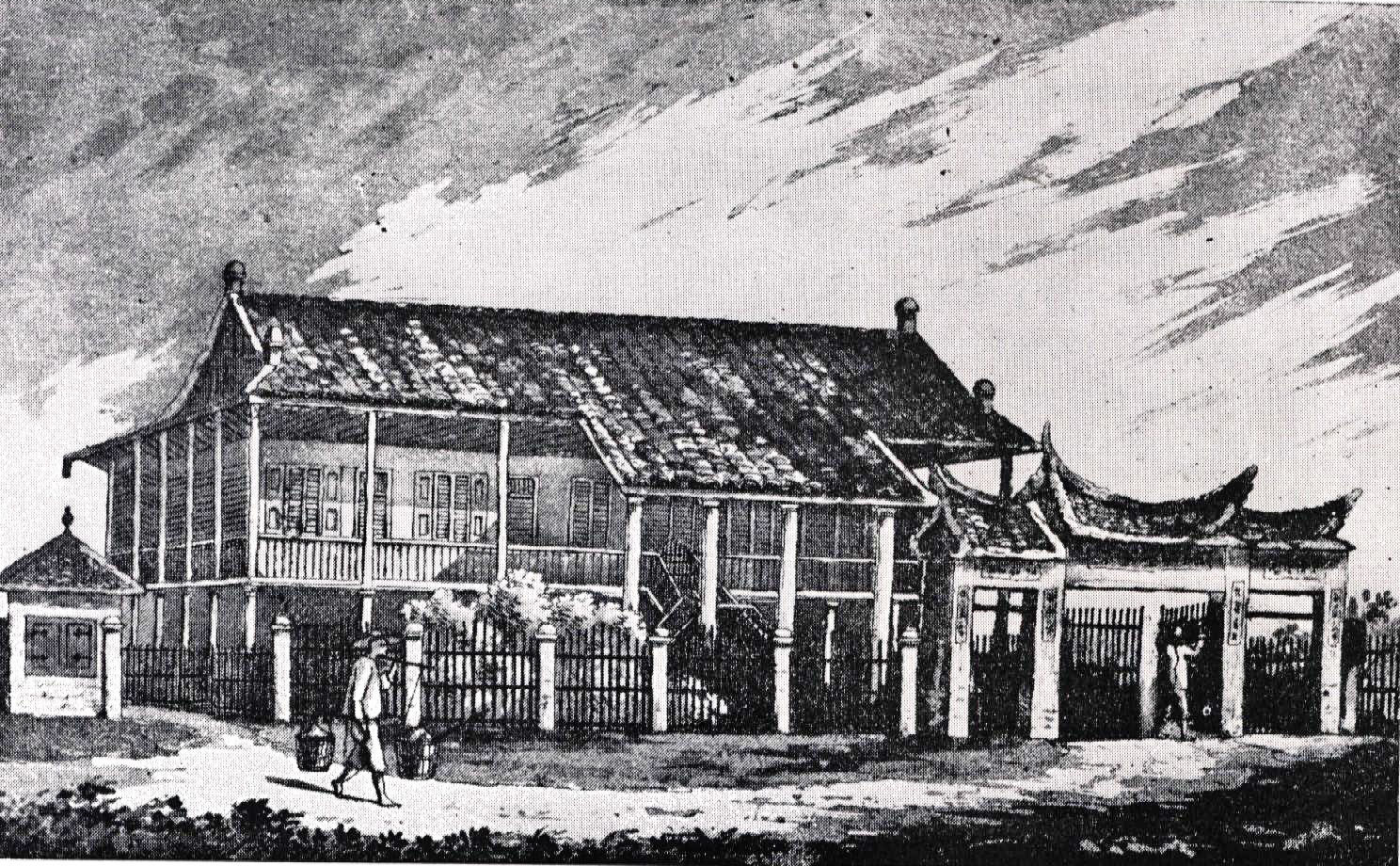
The Anglo-Chinese College in Malacca, in 1834

In 1829 Kidd's wife returned to England on account of her health, giving birth to her daughter in June 1830. Two years later attacks of epilepsy compelled Kidd himself to go back. In 1833 he was appointed pastor of a church at Manningtree in Essex.

In 1837 Kidd was appointed professor of Chinese at University College, London, for a term of five years. Here he had access to the library of Robert Morrison which he consulted. The appointment was not renewed at the end of that term, and Kidd died suddenly of epilepsy on 12 June 1843, at his residence in Camden Town.

== Works ==
As well as short works in Chinese, Kidd was the author of:

- "Critical Notices of Dr. Robert Morrison's Literary Labours" in Memoir of Morrison, 1838, ii. 1–87;
- inaugural lecture at University College on the Chinese language, 1838;
- a catalogue of the Chinese library at the Royal Asiatic Society; and
- China, or Illustrations of the Philosophy, Government, and Literature of the Chinese, London, 1841.

== Family ==
In April 1824 Kidd married Hannah, second daughter of William Irving of Hull. They had four children, three born in China. However, Sara Ann Kidd was born on June 29, 1830, in Hull, after her mother had returned to England.

== Notes ==
Attribution

This article incorporates text from a publication now in the public domain: Lee, Sidney, ed. (1892). "Kidd, Samuel". Dictionary of National Biography. Vol. 31. London: Smith, Elder & Co.
