= Tang Zonghai =

Chinese physician and medical scholar

- 唐宗海
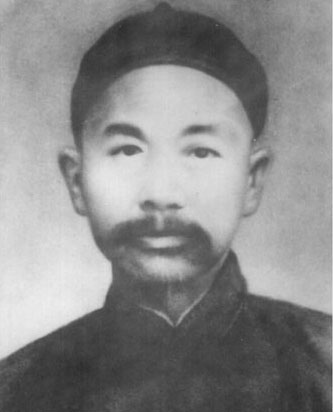
- Born: 1851; Pengzhou, Sichuan
- Died: 1897 or 1908 (aged 46–57)
- Notable work: Zhongxi huitong yijing jingyi (1892)

Tang Zonghai (Chinese: 唐宗海; pinyin: Táng Zōnghǎi; 1851–1897 or 1908), courtesy name Rongchuan (Chinese: 容川; pinyin: Róngchuān), was a Chinese physician and medical scholar active during the late Qing dynasty. Tang was one of the first Chinese physicians to write about the distinctions between Chinese and Western medicine, as well as an early advocate for the integration of the two traditions.

== Early life ==
Tang was born in 1851 in Pengzhou, Sichuan. His father died from illness in 1873, prompting him to study classical medicine. Tang engaged with the writings of Chinese physicians like Wang Qingren, whereas his frequent trips to Shanghai, a port city, also exposed him to Western medicine.

== Career ==
Tang became a jinshi at the age of 38. Instead of joining the civil service, as many of his peers who had been successful in the imperial examinations did, he decided to pursue a career in medicine. Beginning his practice in Sichuan, one of Tang's earliest writings was published in 1884 and concerned blood disorders. After relocating to Jiangnan in the 1880s, Tang developed a keen interest in Western medicine, and became one of the first Chinese physicians to write about the distinctions between Chinese and Western medicine. He was also an early advocate for the integration of both medical traditions.

Tang's 1892 work, Zhongxi huitong yijing jingyi (中西匯通醫經精義), (Note: Translated into English as Essential Meanings of the Medical Canons [Approached] through the Convergence and Assimilation of Chinese and Western [Medicine].) has been described as "one of the most influential medical texts" of his time. In it, Tang defends Chinese medicine—which he sees as having been in decline since the Song dynasty—while exploring the complex relationship between modern Western anatomy and Chinese medicine.

Sometime after the publication of Zhongxi huitong yijing jingyi, Tang wrote Yiyi tongshuo (醫易通說), or A Generalised Account of Medicine and the Classic of Changes, in which he argues that the ancient Chinese text I Ching (Classic of Changes) included ideas that had hitherto been thought of as uniquely Western. Tang died in either 1897 or 1908.
