= Wong Fun =

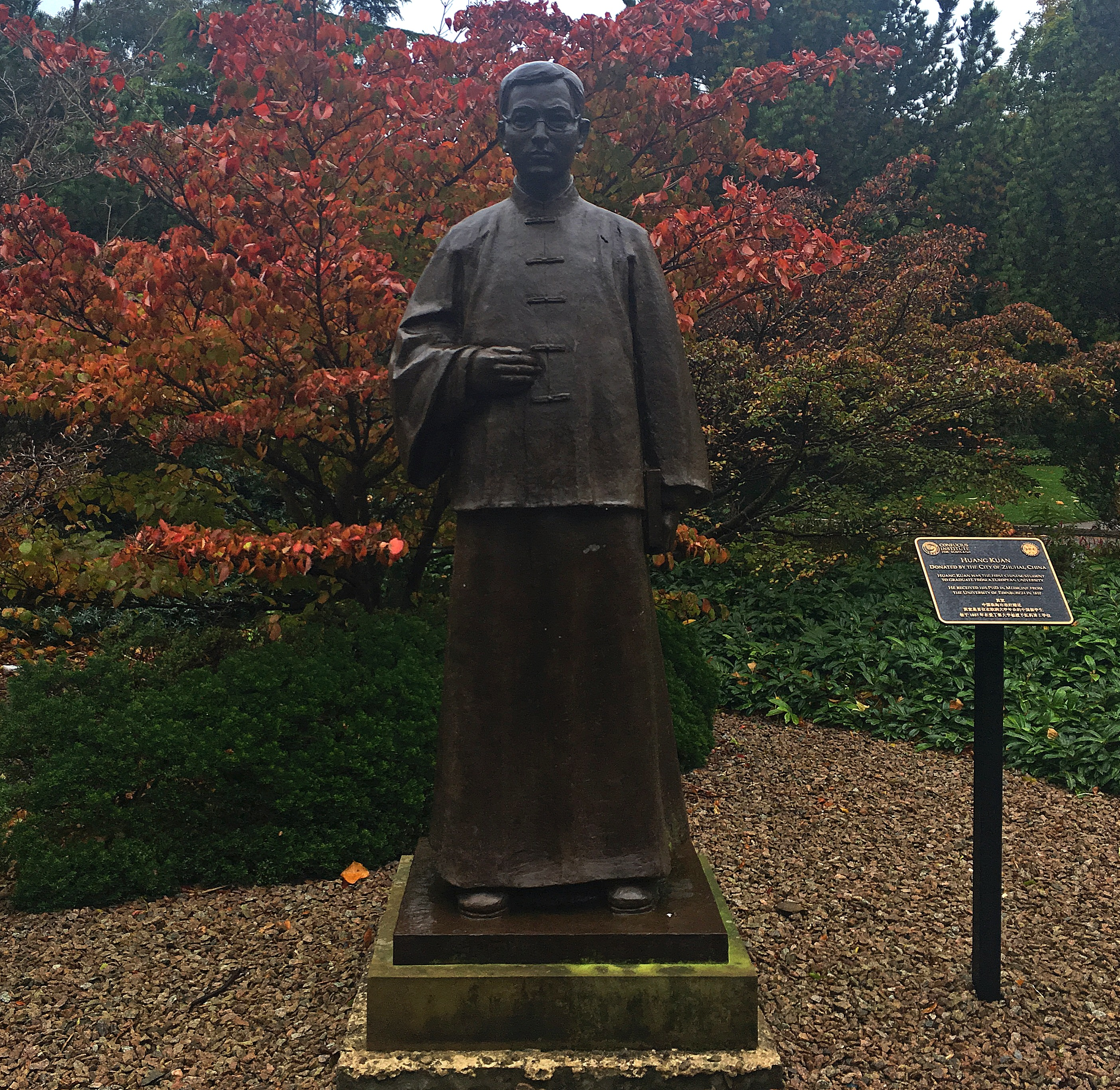
Statue portraying Wong Fun, Confucius Institute for Scotland, University of Edinburgh

Dr. Wong Fun (simplified Chinese: 黄宽; traditional Chinese: 黄寬; pinyin: Huang Kuan; 1829–1878) was one of the first Chinese to study in Europe. After completing his medical degree at the University of Edinburgh, he returned to China and disseminated what he had learned.

== Biography ==
A native of Hsiang-shan, Canton, Wong studied at Morrison Education Society School, in Macao. In 1847, he and two others, Wong Shing and Yung Wing, became the first three Chinese students to the study in the United States. After graduating in 1850 with a degree in literature from Monson Academy in Massachusetts, Wong Fun went to the University of Edinburgh in Scotland in 1850 through the financial support of the Edinburgh Medical Missionary Society and completed his studies in medicine in 1855.

Wong stayed in Edinburgh as an intern until 1857, after which he returned to Hong Kong. The next year, he opened a dispensary in Canton working for the London Missionary Society. This brought about a new generation of doctors who saw a wealth of knowledge in Western medicine.

In 2007, Principal Timothy O'Shea of the University of Edinburgh presented Wong Fun's transcripts and exam results to his hometown in China. In return, a bronze statue of Wong Fun was erected at the University of Edinburgh in September of that year.

== See also ==
- Yung Wing
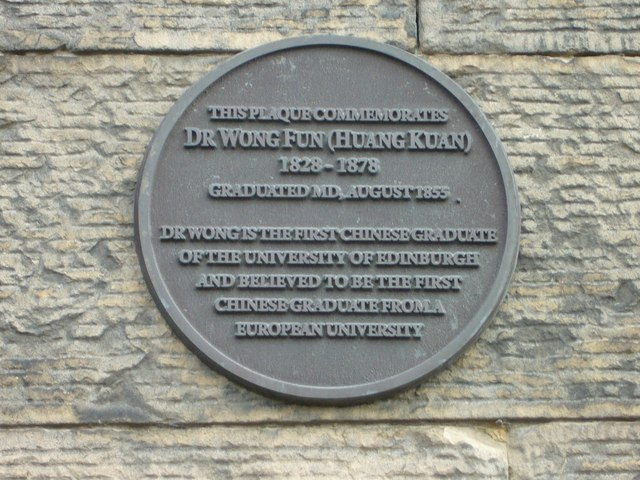
  Plaque honoring Dr. Wong Fun in the University of Edinburgh
- List of Chinese physicians
