= Wilbraham & Monson Academy =

Private secondary school in Wilbraham, Massachusetts, US

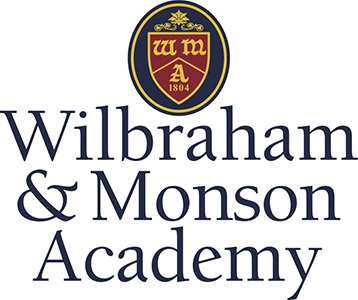

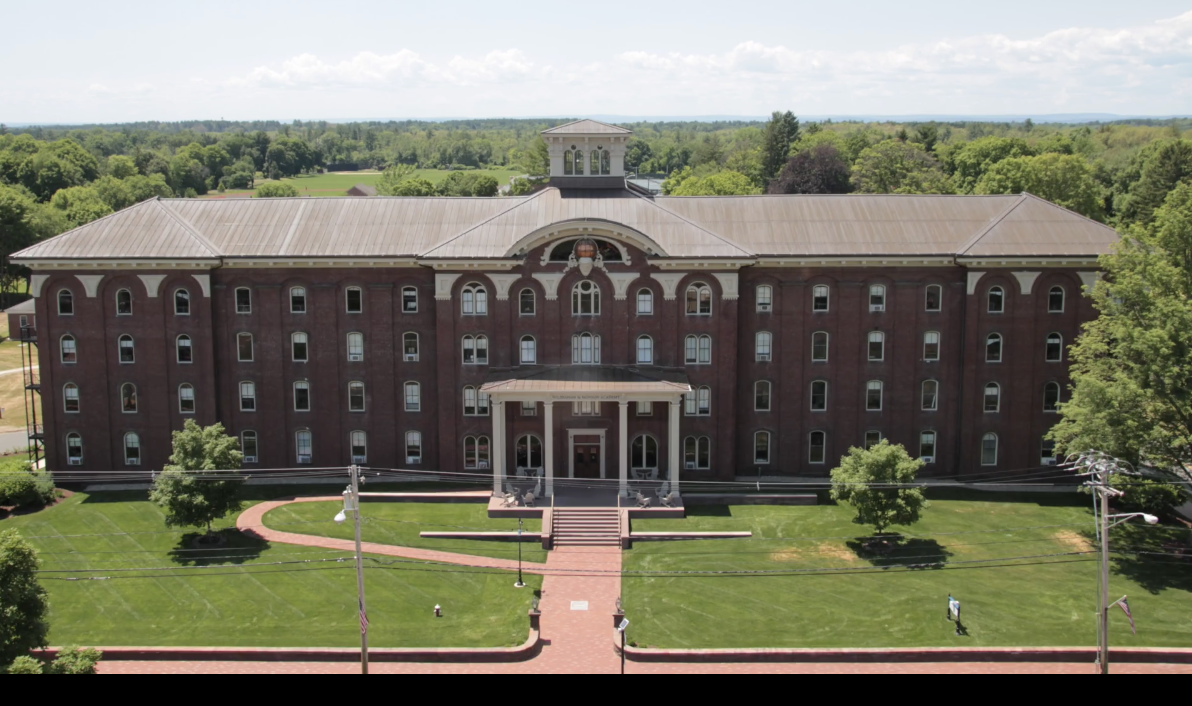
- Rich Hall

Location
- 423 Main Street; Wilbraham, Hampden, Massachusetts 01095; United States
- Coordinates: 42°07′20.96″N 72°25′53.67″W

Information
- Former names: Monson Academy; Wilbraham Wesleyan Academy
- Type: Private, boarding, day, college preparatory school
- Motto: At Home. In the World.
- Established: 1804; 222 years ago
- CEEB code: 222400
- NCES School ID: 00604261
- Chair: Scott B. Jacobs
- Head of School: Brian Easler
- Faculty: 66
- Grades: 9-12, including postgraduate
- Gender: Coeducational
- Enrollment: 400
- Student to teacher ratio: 6:1
- Campus: 400 acres (1.6 km^{2})
- Colors: Red and Blue
- Mascot: Titan
- Nickname: Titans
- Annual tuition: $75,500 - 7-day boarding; $65,500 - 5-day boarding; $45,000 - Upper School day; $35,000 - Middle School day
- Revenue: $ 22,102,738
- Website: wma.us

Wilbraham & Monson Academy (WMA) is a private college-preparatory school in Wilbraham, Massachusetts. Founded in 1804, it is a four-year boarding and day secondary school. It offers grades 6–12 and a postgraduate year. The School is located in the center of the town of Wilbraham, 75 miles (121 km) from Boston and 150 miles (240 km) from New York City.

== Notable alumni ==
- Henry Barnard (1811–1900), educator
- Alfred Ely Beach, inventor, publisher, and patent lawyer
- Rick Bennett, NHL ice hockey player and college coach
- Mary Ann Booth (1843–1922), microscopist
- Henry Billings Brown, associate justice of the US Supreme Court. Wrote majority opinion for Plessy v. Ferguson
- Tyrell Burgess, Bermudian professional soccer player with Vancouver Whitecaps FC
- Kraisak Choonhavan, member of Thailand Senate for Nakhon Ratchasima Province (2000–2006); former chairman of the Thai Senate's Foreign Relations Committee
- Russell H. Conwell, minister and founder of Temple University - 1859
- Winthrop Murray Crane (1853–1920), US Senator
- Emily Norcross Dickinson, mother of 19th-century poet Emily Dickinson
- Kyle Filipowski, Duke University and NBA basketball player
- Richard Fuld, former CEO Lehman Brothers
- Wong Fun, first Western-trained doctor in China, graduated from University of Edinburgh - 1855
- Wenyen Gabriel (born 1997), South Sudanese-American basketball player for Maccabi Tel Aviv of the Israeli Basketball Premier League
- Bill Guerin, retired NHL hockey player; general manager of Minnesota Wild; four-time Stanley Cup champion
- William Stewart Halstead, surgeon, studied at Monson Academy for a time
- Ratcliffe Hicks, Connecticut state legislator, industrialist, lawyer, and benefactor of the University of Connecticut
- Kim Hyun-jong, South Korean trade minister under Moon Jae-in and Roh Moo-hyun
- Galway Kinnell (1927–2014), poet
- Christine Ladd-Franklin, mathematician, logician and psychologist - 1865
- Oliver Marcy, served as acting President of Northwestern University twice, while also serving as a professor of natural history
- Patrick Mazeika (born 1993), baseball player
- Pat Phelan, professional soccer player for the New England Revolution
- Nitya Pibulsonggram, Thai Ambassador to the US (1996–2000), Foreign Minister of Thailand (2006–2008)
- Humphrey Pickard, Canadian first president of Mount Allison University
- Charles Pratt, oil tycoon and founder of the Pratt Institute
- William Rice (1821–1897), Methodist Episcopal minister, author, and librarian
- Joey Santiago (born 1965), band member of the Pixies
- Pote Sarasin, Prime Minister of Thailand (1957) secretary-general of SEATO (1958–1964)
- Lucy Stone, orator, abolitionist, suffragist, and women's rights advocate
- William Strong, lawyer, jurist, and politician who served as an Associate Justice of the US Supreme Court
- Mark Warburton, gymnast
- Yung Wing, first Chinese graduate of an American university (Yale) - 1854

== See also ==
- Wilbraham Wesleyan Academy
