= Chunyu Tiying =

Chinese woman, c. 174 BC

Chunyu Tiying (淳于緹縈)
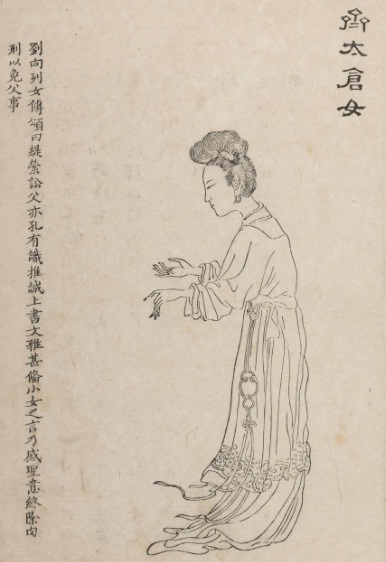
- Qing-era drawing of Tiying
- Born: c. 174 BC; Linyi, Western Han

Chunyu Tiying
- Traditional Chinese: 淳于緹縈
- Simplified Chinese: 淳于缇萦
Transcriptions
Standard Mandarin
- Hanyu Pinyin: Chúnyú Tíyíng
- Wade–Giles: Chʻun^{2}-yü^{2} Tʻi^{2}ying^{2}
- IPA: [ʈʂʰwə̌n.y̌ tʰǐǐŋ]
Middle Chinese
- Middle Chinese: /d͡ʑiuɪn.ɦɨo dei.ʔwiᴇŋ/
Old Chinese
- Zhengzhang: /*djun ɢʷa tʰeːʔ qʷeŋ/

Chunyu Tiying (Chinese: 淳于緹縈; fl. c. 174 BC) was a woman known for persuading the Emperor Wen of Han to abolish the "5 corporal punishments", as told in the Western Han folktale, "Tiying Saves Her Father" (缇萦救父).

== Biography ==
Tiying was born in Lingzhi around 190 BC. She was the youngest of five daughters of Chunyu Yi. While Tiying's father was originally an official in charge of an imperial warehouse responsible for storing grain, he eventually studied with several famous doctors and became a well-known medical practitioner.

In 176 BC, when Chunyu Tiying was around age 14, her father was accused of malpractice. Some say that this was due to his refusal to give medical care to some people; others say that, after he could not save the life of a noblewoman, the devastated husband claimed that it was Chunyu Yi's treatment that caused the death of his wife. Chunyu Yi was subsequently imprisoned.

When Chunyu Yi was taken away, he knew he would be subjected to one of the Five Punishments. Knowing that he had no one who could appeal for him, he looked at his daughters and said "I will be sent to the capital for punishment where no woman can follow and I have five daughters. If only I had a son!" In the pre-modern China, women did not have a say in the court nor in society, unless they had some sort of special status. After hearing what her father said, Tiying made up her mind and followed her father on a journey to the capital. On the journey there, she endured pain and hunger.

Once she arrived at the capital, she made an appeal on behalf of her father to Emperor Wen himself instead of going to any of the officials. She made the appeal despite knowing that, as a young girl, her appeal would likely be treated with derision and even seen as improper conduct. She also took a novel approach in her appeal. Instead of her writing about her father's good nature and accomplishments to show he deserved leniency, as might have been expected, she instead wrote about the legal tradition of the Five Punishments, showing how cruel and unethical they were.

After hearing that a young girl had written a letter of grievance to him, the emperor was eager to read what the letter was about. In her letter, she wrote:

"Once a man is executed, he cannot come back to life. Once a man is mutilated, even if he is proved to be innocent later, he would be disabled for life, and there is no way to reverse the suffering he experiences. Even if he wishes to start anew, he will be unable to do so. I have heard stories of how a son can redeem a father's guilt. As a daughter, I am willing to redeem my father's sin by being your slave for the rest of my life. I beg you to spare him from this punishment, and thus he will have an opportunity to make a fresh start."

Emperor Wen was deeply moved by Tiying's letter. Not only was it well-written, but it also pointed out the cruelty and injustice of the Five Punishments and how it did not give the convicted a chance to defend themselves. The letter also impressed many officials in the court. Many praised the way in which she endured hardships along with her father and was willing to become a slave in exchange for her father's life. After reading the letter, Emperor Wen pardoned Tiying's father, declined her offer to become a slave, and also abolished the 5 corporal punishments and replaced them with incarceration and labor of limited duration. Soon, the story of Tiying's bravery was spread around the country and many wished to have a daughter like her.
