= Ma Xiaonian =

Chinese physician and professor

Ma Xiaonian (Simplified Chinese: 马晓年; Traditional Chinese: 馬曉年; pinyin: Mǎ Xiǎo Nián; born May 8, 1945, Fenyang, Shanxi, China), is a Chinese physician and professor of sexual medicine who pioneered the field of sexual medicine and sexology in China. Ma's research on sexual medicine and Chinese sexuality has profoundly influenced cultural and social values in China since the 1980s. His recent sexological work has focused primarily on Chinese female sexuality
