= Breezy Path =

Street in Hong Kong

Coordinates: 22.283422°N 114.145790°E

Breezy Path (Chinese: 卑利士道) is a short and steep one-way road in the Mid-Levels, Hong Kong Island. It begins at the junction with Park Road and Lyttelton Road and winds down to the junction with Bonham Road.

Vehicular traffic can only travel downwards from Park Road to Bonham Road. There are no shops along the road; only residential buildings (Ying Piu Mansion & Breezy Court) and the So Chau Yim Ping Building (a.k.a. Site B) which is part of the Ying Wa Girls' School. It provides a connection from Lyttleton Road to Bonham Road and Caine Road, and some minibus routes use it as a shortcut – e.g. Route 56, which goes from Robinson Road to North Point.

== History ==
In the 1920s, Alice Memorial Hospital was relocated to the site next to Nethersole Hospital. Both hospitals were located at the junction of Bonham Road with Breezy Path. In 1954, they merged to form the Alice Ho Miu Ling Nethersole Hospital. The hospital was relocated to Tai Po in 1997.

The Hong Kong Institute of Technology building on Breezy Path was demolished to make way for the new Ying Wa Girls' School's campus.

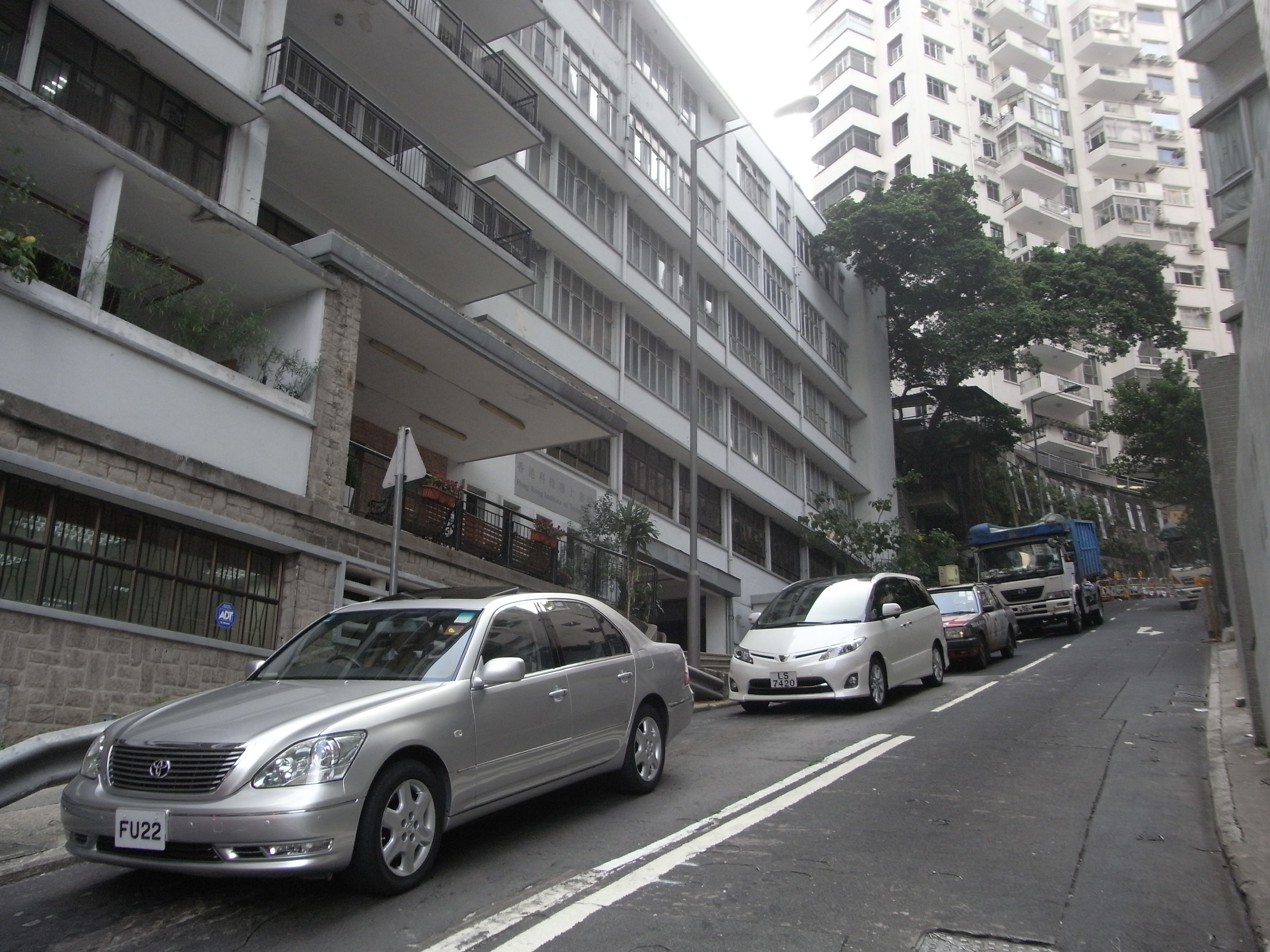
Breezy Path, looking southeast from Bonham Road

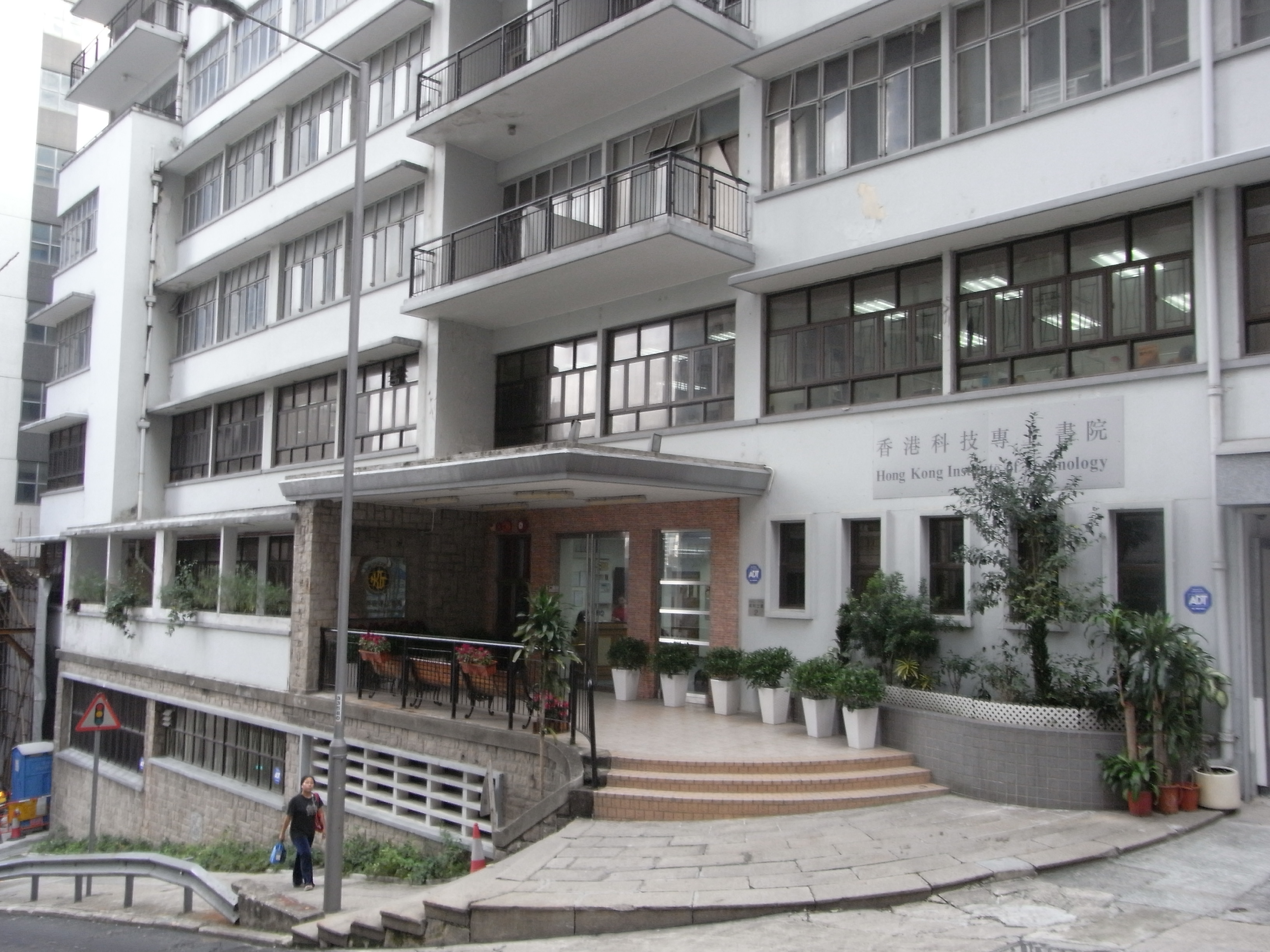
The former Hong Kong Institute of Technology

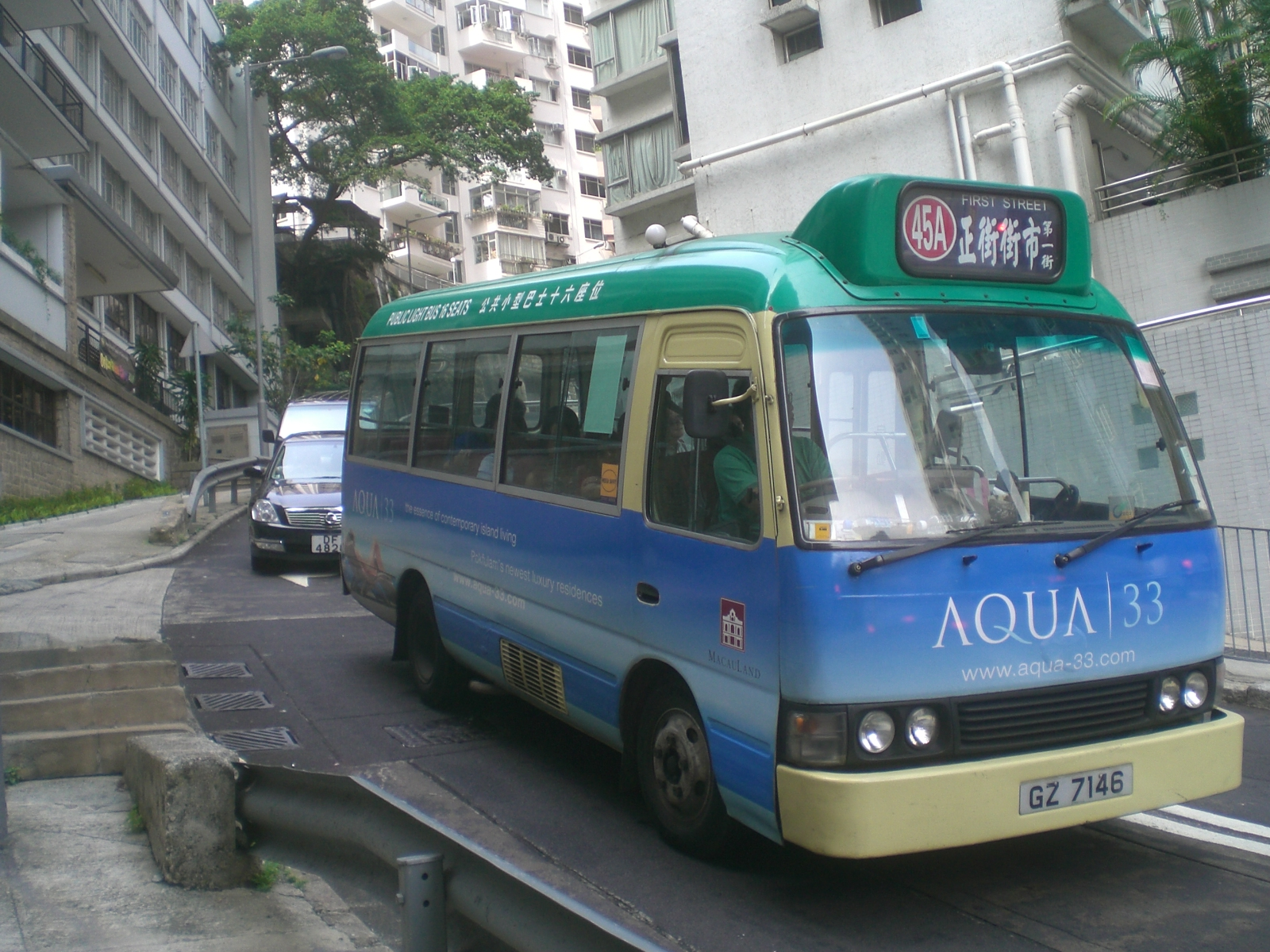
Minibus 45A descending Breezy Path

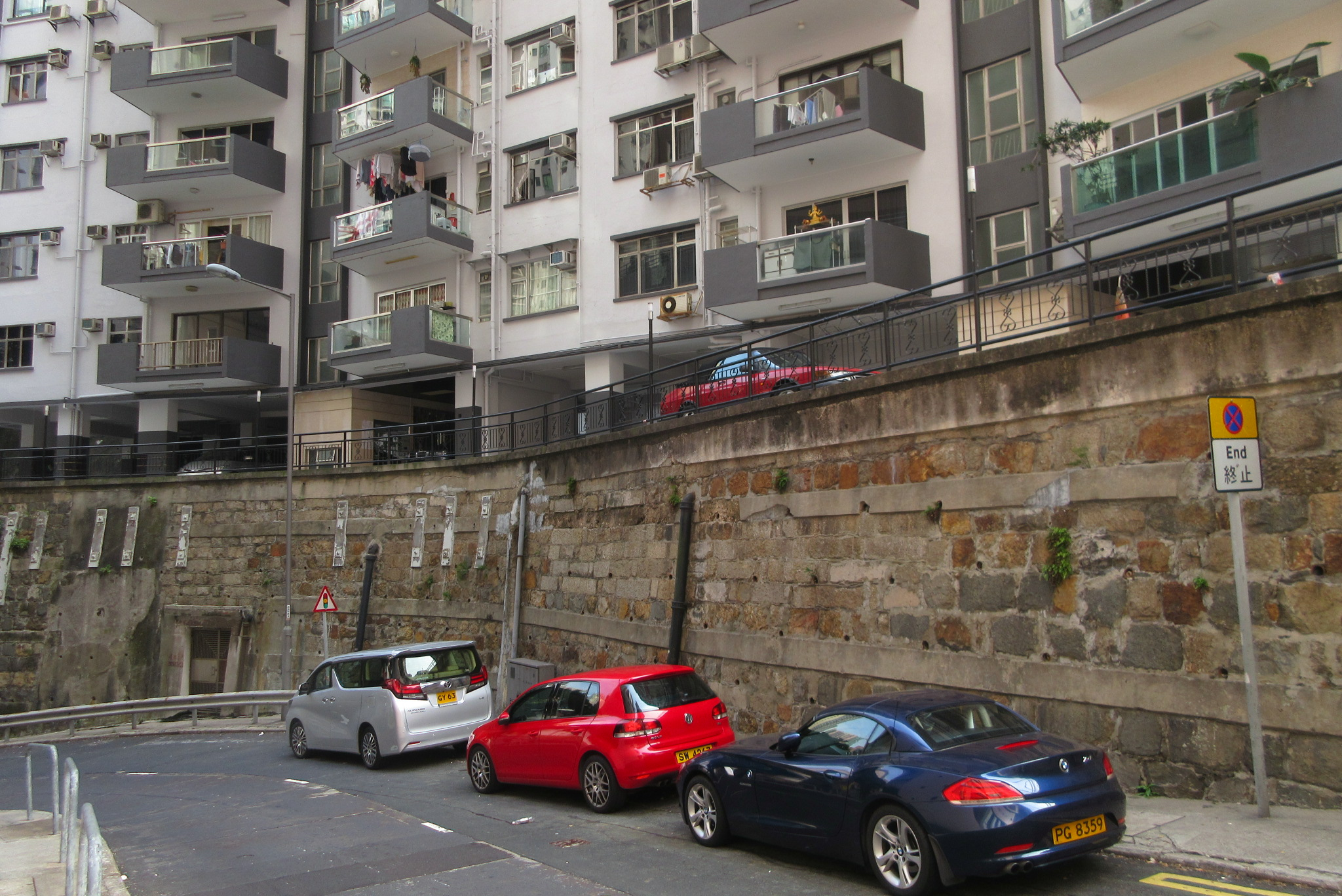
Stone wall encircling Breezy Court

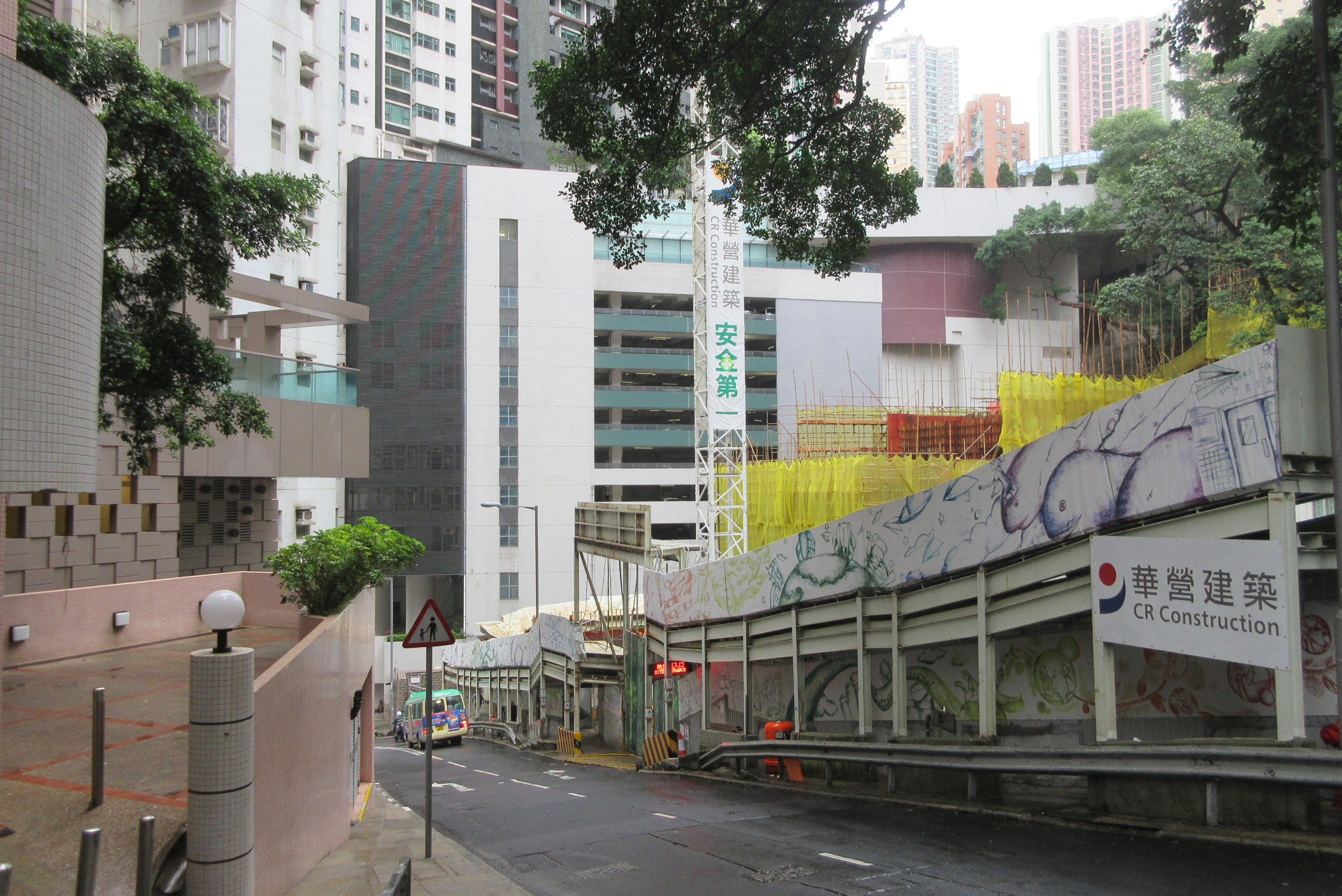
Construction of the So Chau Yim Ping Building

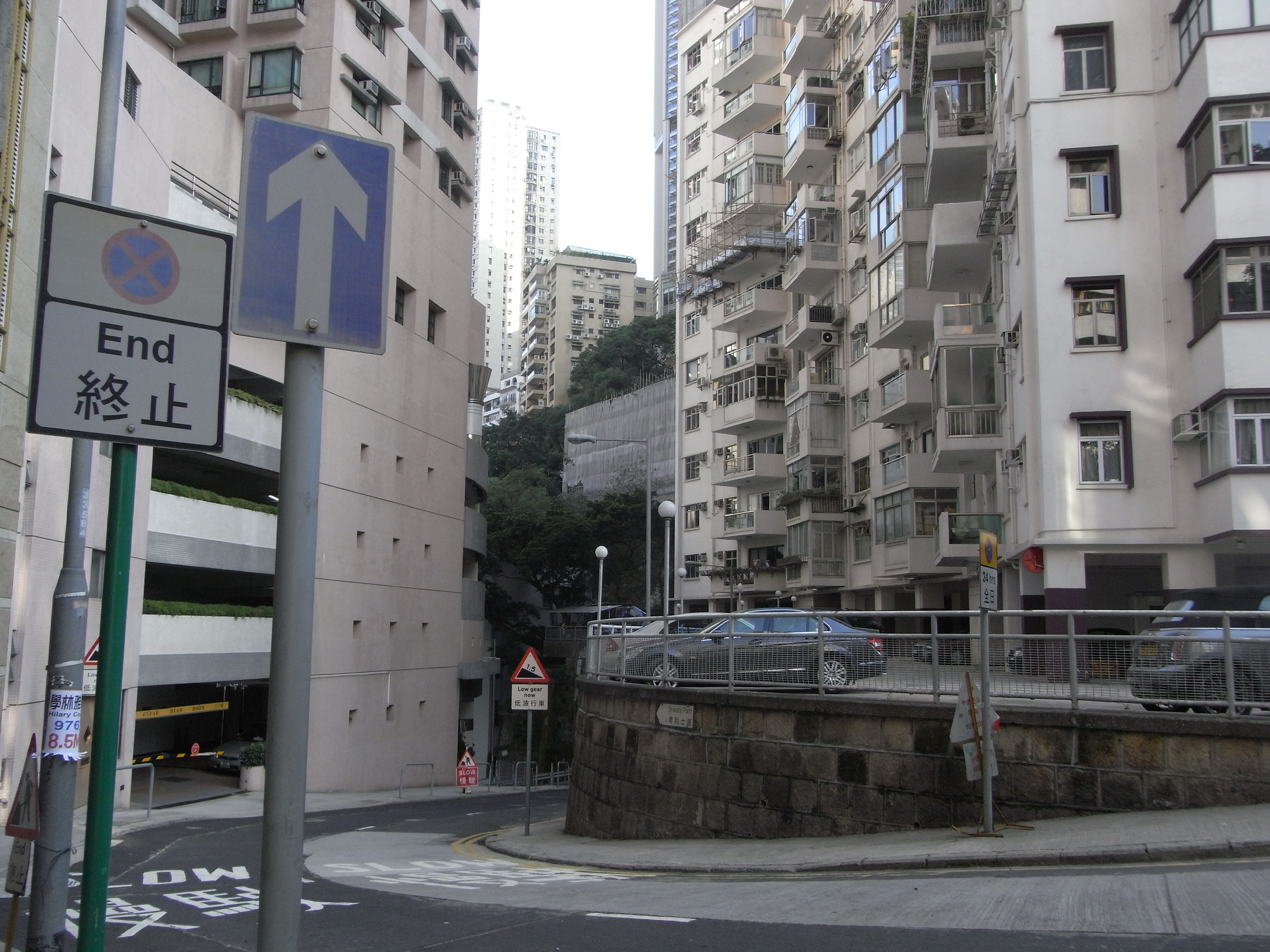
Sharp turn at the start of Breezy Hill
