= Citybus Route 13 =

Bus route in Hong Kong

13
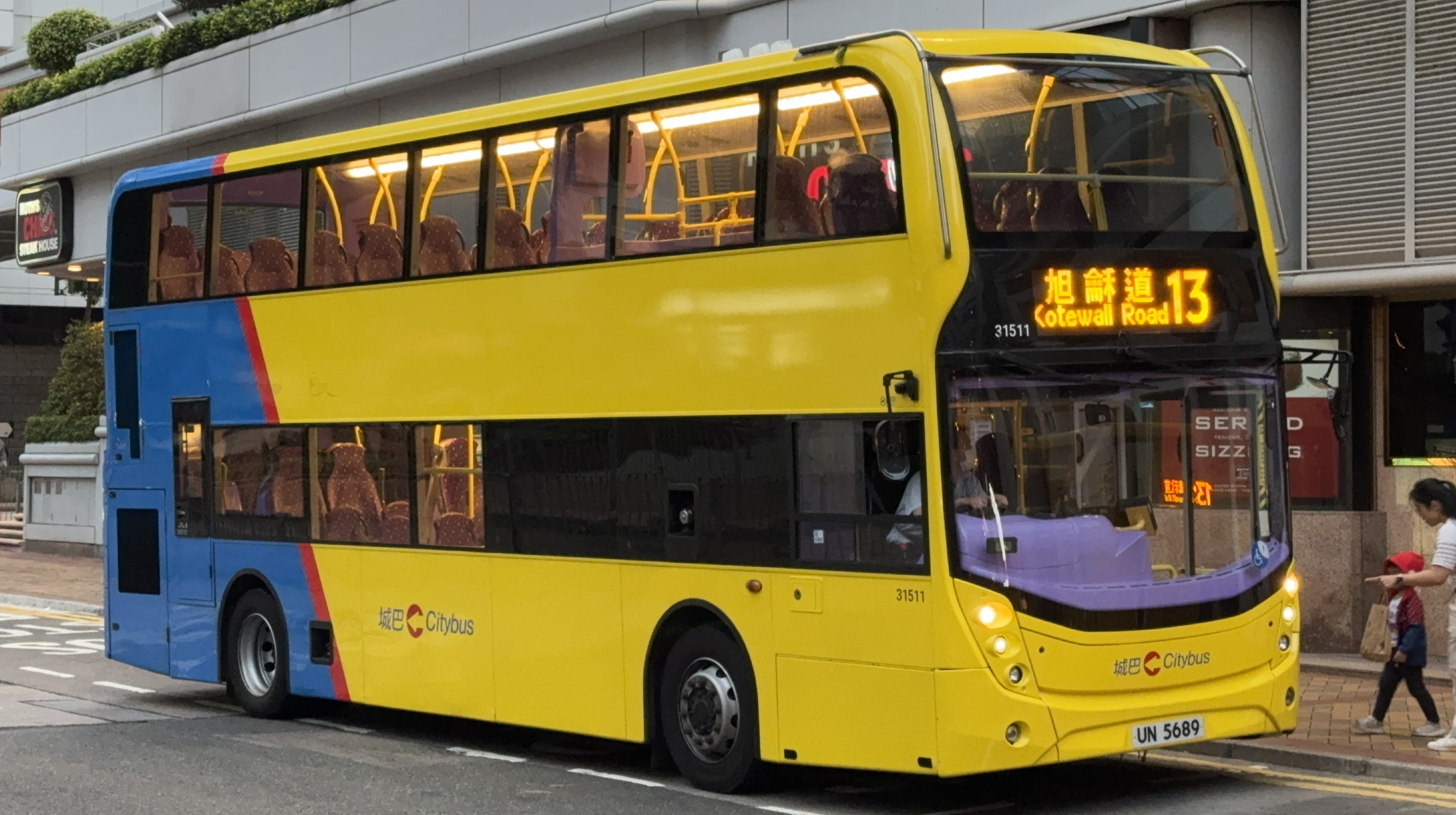
- An Alexander Dennis Enviro400 servicing route 13, seen at Admiralty in March 2024

Overview
- Operator: Citybus
- Garage: Chong Fu Road
- Vehicle: Alexander Dennis Enviro200; Alexander Dennis Enviro400 MMC; Youngman JNP6120GR

Route
- Start: Admiralty (Tamar Street)
- Via: Central; Caine Road; Park Road; Lyttelton Road
- End: Kotewall Road
- Length: 3.7-5.3 km

Service
- Level: Daily
- Frequency: 12–25 minutes
- Journey time: 21–27 minutes
- Operates: 06:30 until 00:00

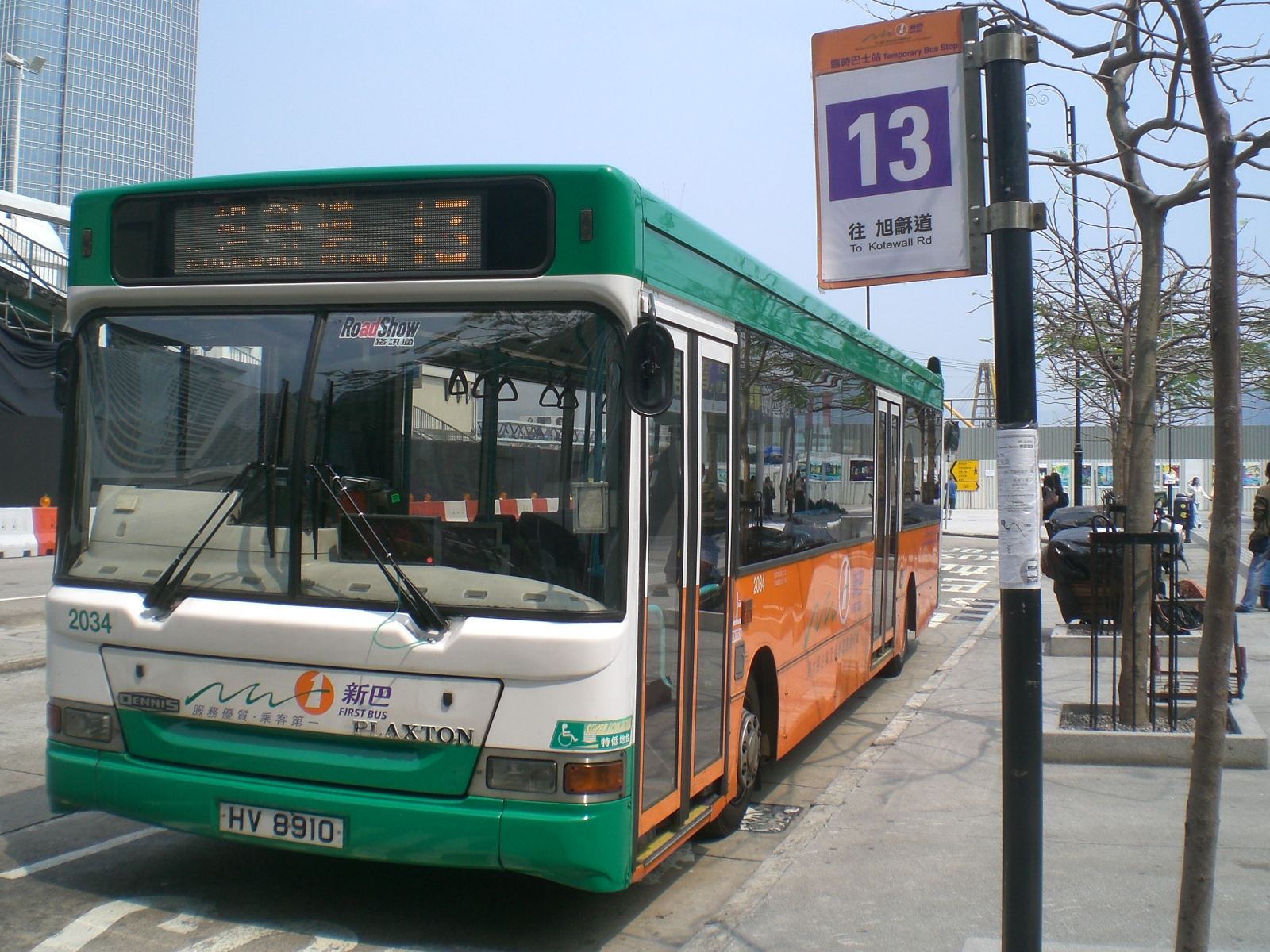
Bus terminus at City Hall, Edinburgh Place

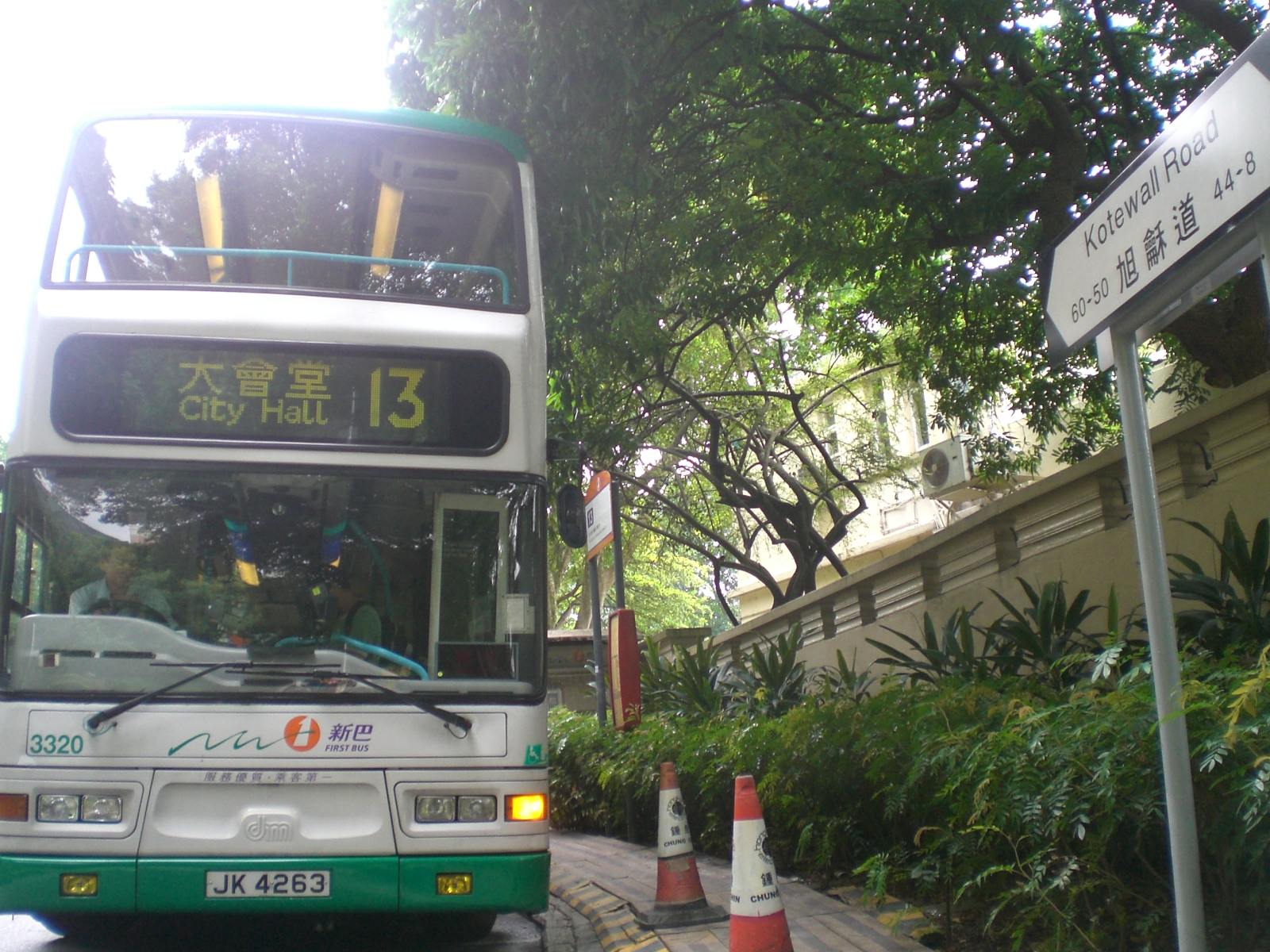
Bus terminus at Kotewall Road

Citybus Route 13 on Hong Kong Island is a bus service operated by Citybus, between Admiralty (Tamar Street) and Kotewall Road, Mid Levels.

== History ==
Route 13 service was started by China Motor Bus (CMB) on 16 April 1974, when the first bus lane in Hong Kong, the one along westbound Caine Road, came into operation. The fare at that time was 50 cents, without child fare concession or section fare arrangements. At that time, the main bus fleet on the line was Guy Arab Mk V (LX class). After CMB converted routes 260, 261 and 262 into full air-conditioned services in 1991, the MCW Metrobus coaches used on these routes were transferred to route 13.

The route was handed over to the current operator NWFB on 1 September 1998, when the franchise for CMB to operate bus services ended. On 13 September 1998 route 13 became a full air-conditioned service. Later NWFB introduced Dennis Trident 10.3m buses (33XX) on the route. After the Star Ferry Pier moved from Edinburgh Place Ferry Pier to the new Central Piers, the Central terminus of the route did not move to the new terminus there; it stayed where it was, only with a change of the name to Central (City Hall).

The route and the location of the termini for route has never been permanently changed since its inauguration until 2012, making it the bus service in Hong Kong with the route sustained for the longest period of time.

As a result of Citybus Route 12M reduced service to weekday morning peak only, the route was extended to Admiralty (Tamar Street) effective 14 August 2022.

=== Numbering ===
Until the 1970s, new CMB routes were numbered in consecutive order. Route 12 was opened in 1955 and route 14 in 1960, but CMB initially skipped the number 13, citing the superstitious belief that 13 is an unlucky number as a reason. When CMB planned to operate a new service between Star Ferry Pier and Kotewall Road, the decision to use the number 13 caused controversy within the upper levels of the company. Eventually, the director of CMB, Ngan Shing-kwan, who was a Christian, announced on a newspaper that he does not believe the unluckiness of the number 13, and decided that the number will be used on the new route.

== Route ==
=== Admiralty (Tamar Street) towards Kotewall Road ===
The route length from City Hall towards Kotewall Road is 5.3 km in a time of 27 minutes, using (in order):

- Harcourt Road
- Queen's Road Central
- D'Aguilar Street
- Lyndhurst Terrace
- Hollywood Road
- Arbuthnot Road
- Caine Road
- Bonham Road
- Park Road
- Lyttelton Road
- Oaklands Avenue
- Kotewall Road

=== Kotewall Road towards Admiralty (Tamar Street) ===
The route length from Kotewall Road towards City Hall is 3.7 km in a time of 21 minutes, using (in order):

- Kotewall Road
- Oaklands Avenue
- Lyttelton Road
- Park Road
- Robinson Road
- Castle Road
- Caine Road
- Governor House
- Connaught Road Central
- Edinburgh Place
- Queensway
