= Ying Wa Girls' School =

Secondary school in Hong Kong

- 英華女學校

Location
- 76 Robinson Road, Mid-Levels; Hong Kong; 22°16′58″N 114°8′50″E

Information
- Type: Grant School, day, Girls' secondary school
- Motto: 寸陰是惜 (Time is Precious; Treasure Every Minute)
- Established: 1900 (126 years, 52 days)
- Founder: Miss Helen Davies (London Missionary Society)
- President: Reverend So Shing Yit
- Principal: Ms. Tiffany Chuk
- Grades: Form 1 – Form 6
- Enrollment: c. 1,000
- Language: English
- Houses: Davies, Hogben, Hutchinson, Silcocks, Jenkins
- Colour: Blue
- Affiliation: Hong Kong Council of the Church of Christ in China
- Website: www.ywgs.edu.hk

Ying Wa Girls' School
- Traditional Chinese: 英華女學校
- Simplified Chinese: 英华女学校
Transcriptions
Standard Mandarin
- Hanyu Pinyin: Yīng Huá Nǚ Xuéxiào
Yue: Cantonese
- Jyutping: jing1 waa4 neoi5 hok6 haau6

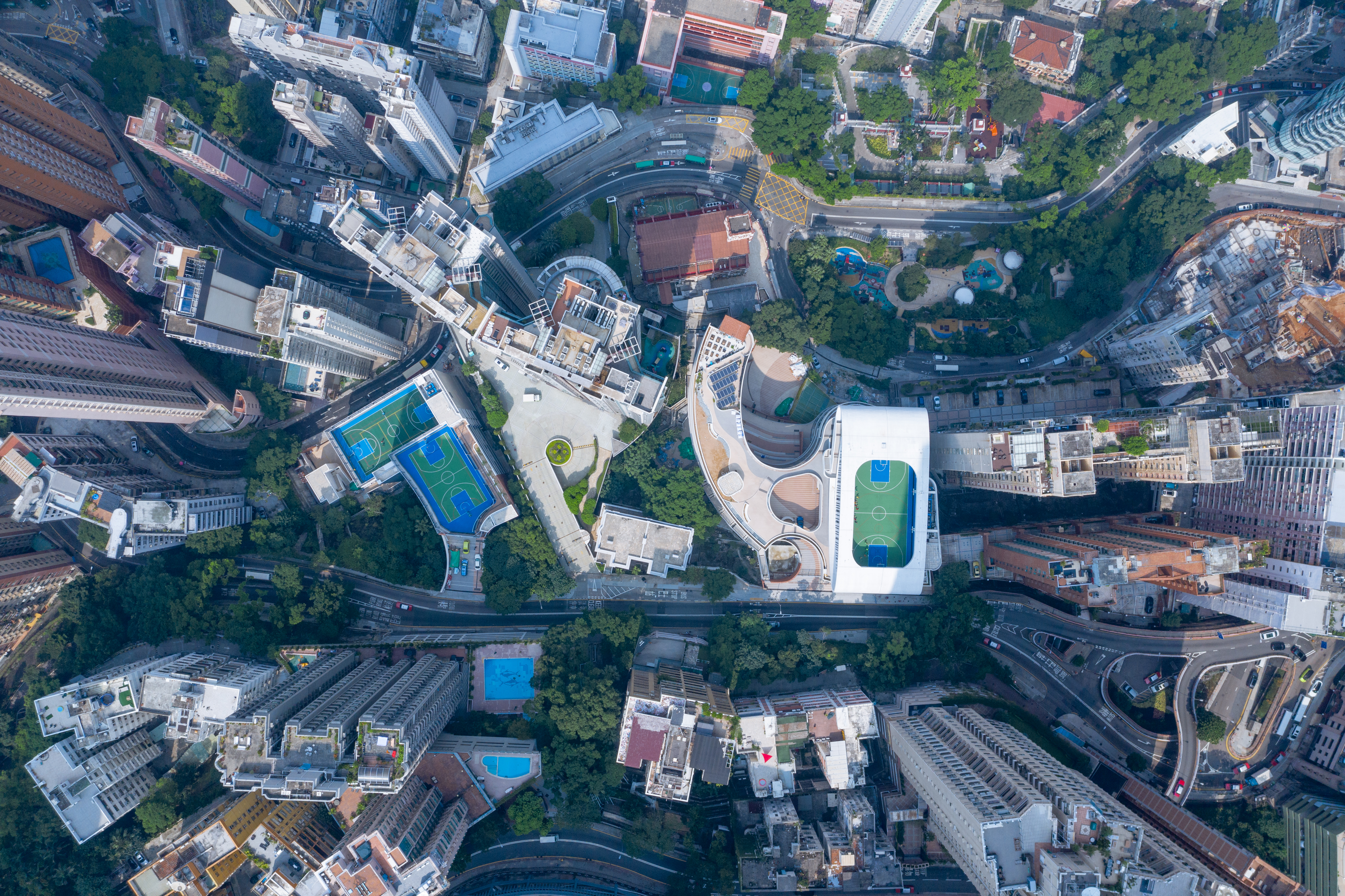
Aerial view of YWGS

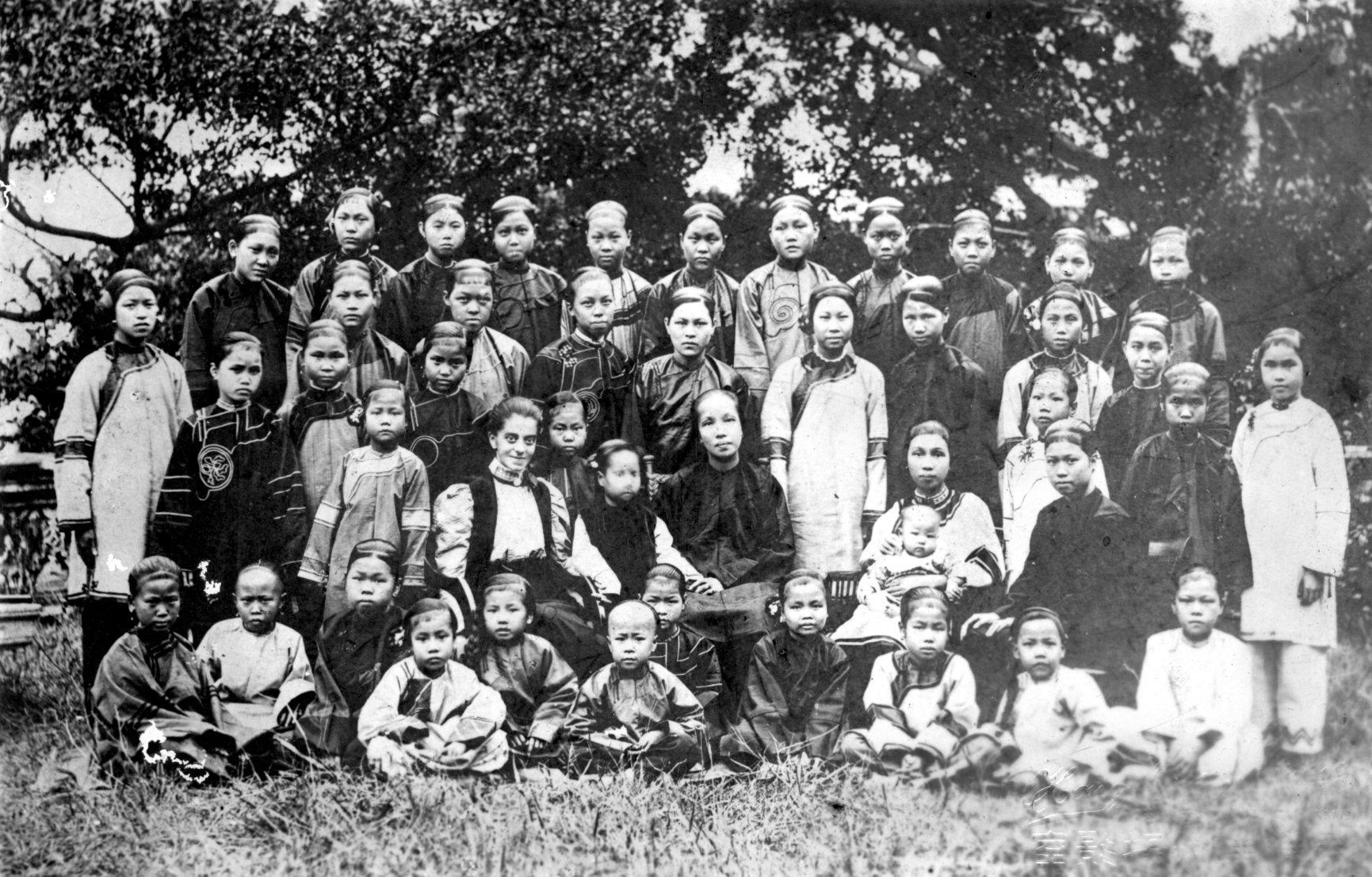
Founder Miss Helen Davies

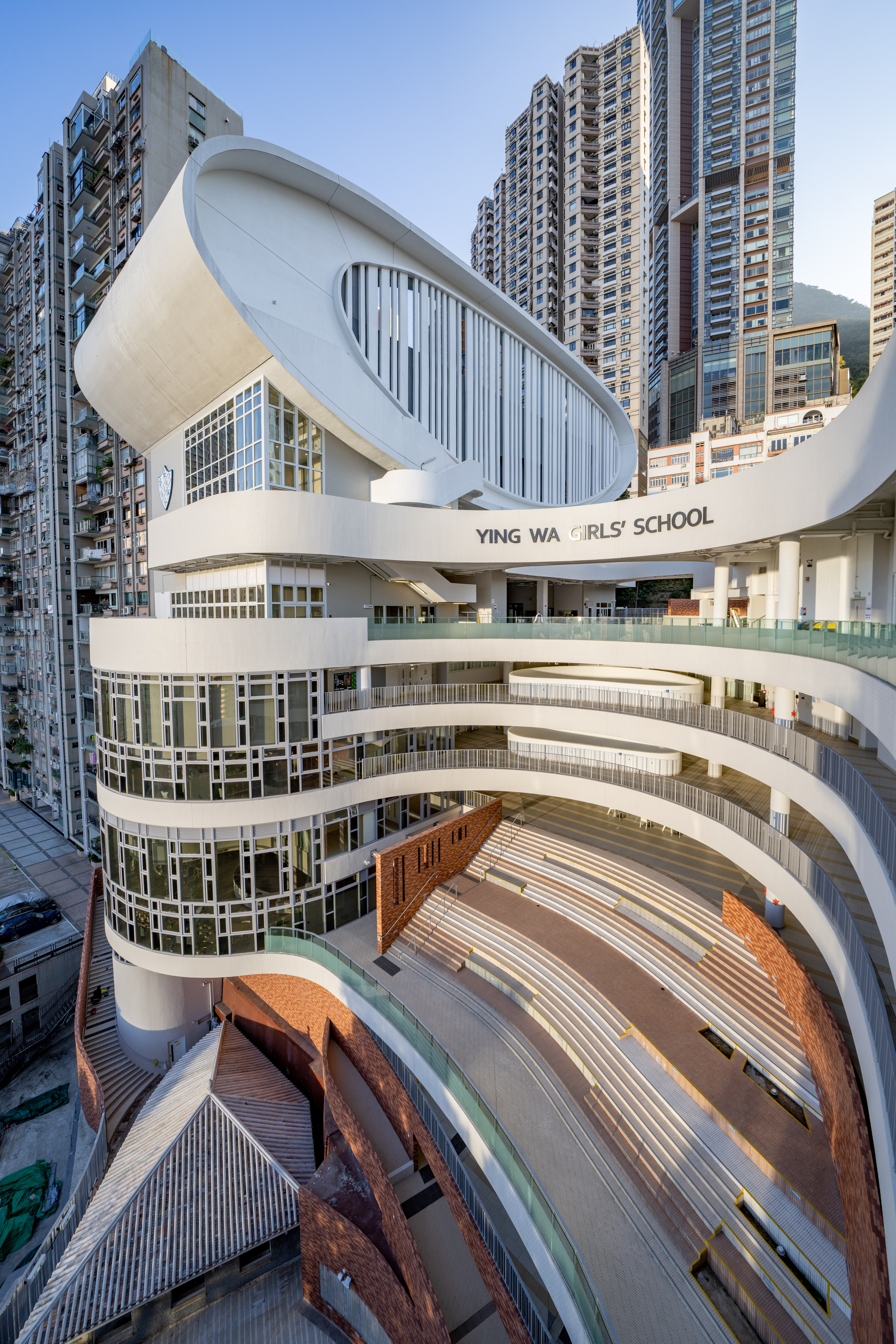
Ying Wa Girls' School New Campus

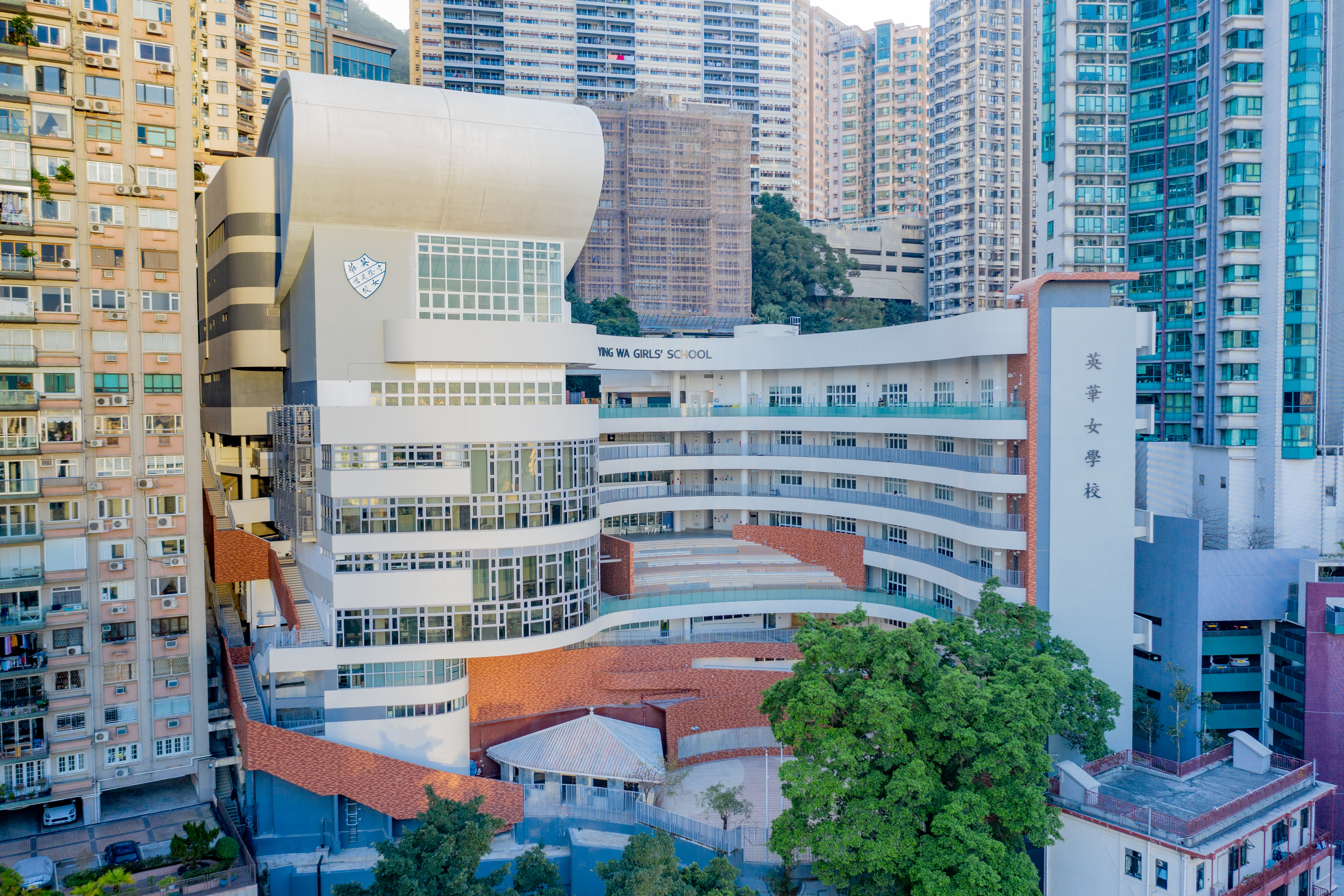
Robinson Road Campus

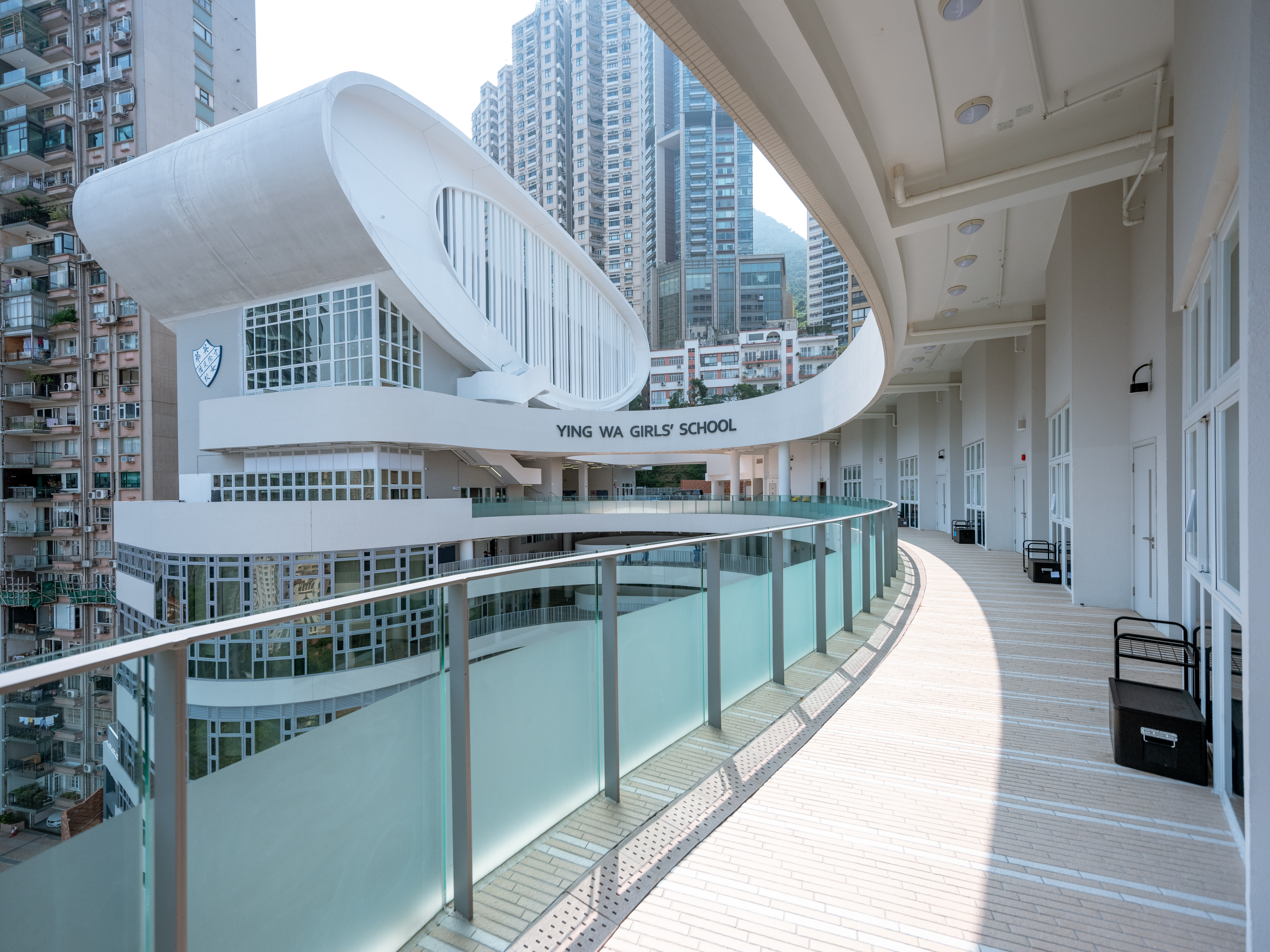
YWGS New Campus

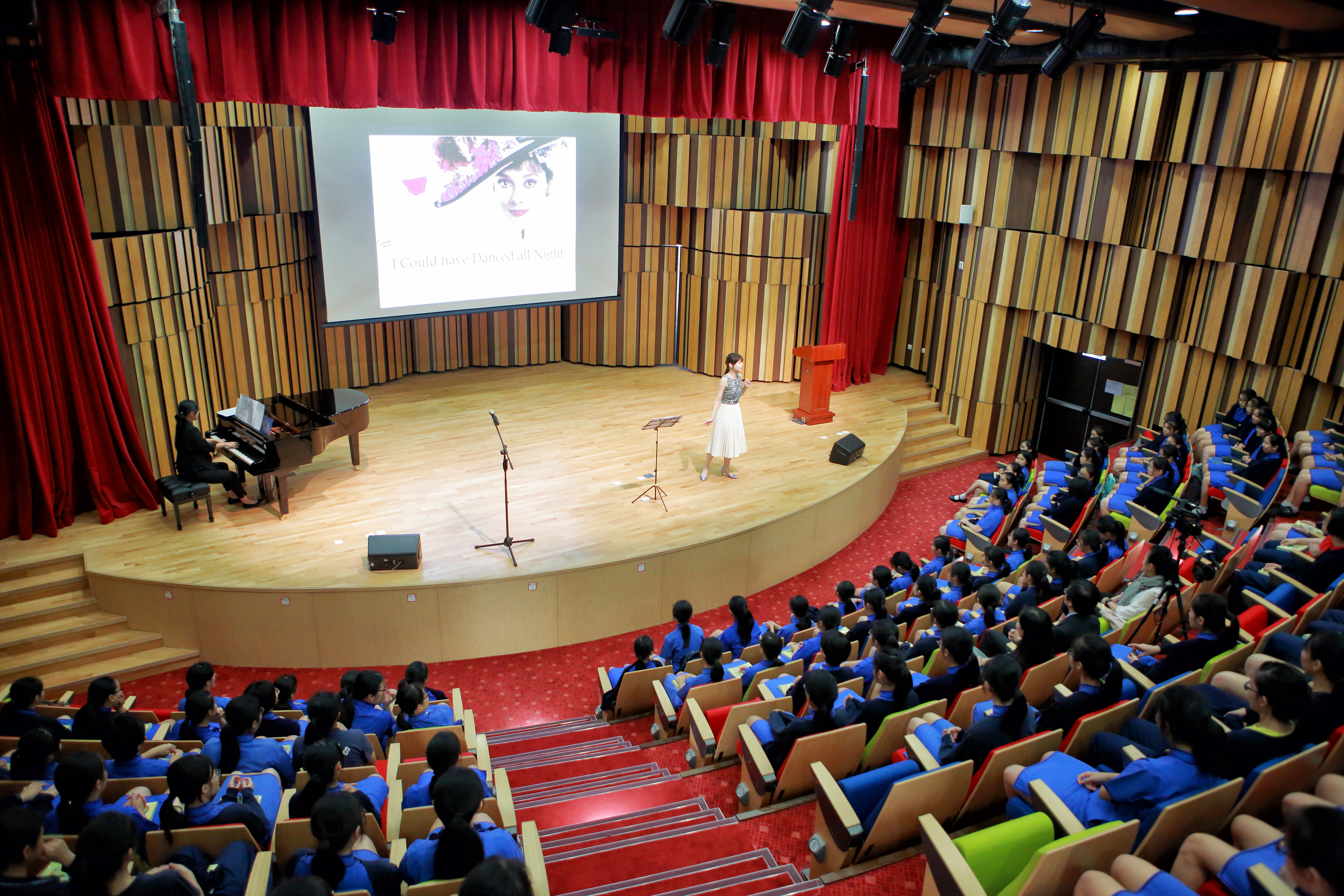
Auditorium

Ying Wa Girls' School (Chinese: 英華女學校) is an HKCCCC secondary day school for girls in Hong Kong. The campus is located at 76 Robinson Road, in the Mid-Levels district. The enrolment currently stands at just under 1,000 students; it is one of the 22 Grant Schools in Hong Kong. Ying Wa Girls' School is a selective secondary school, and its graduates are known for their distinguished performances in public examinations. The current Principal is Tiffany Chuk, who succeeded Francis Kwan in 2025; he assumed the role from Ruth Lee in 2015.

The present campus comprises two sites, the Robinson Road Campus (Site A) stretching from Robinson Road to the junction with Bonham Road, and the newly acquired Breezy Path Campus (Site B).

== History ==
Ying Wa Girls' School was founded in 1900 by Helen Davies of the London Missionary Society. The School started as a boarding school for girls, and expanded to include a secondary school in 1915, followed by a two-year kindergarten in 1916. The School was referred to in English as a ‘Training Home’. It was not until 1920 that the name Ying Wa Girls’ School was officially adopted. The School started as a privately run institution with a boarding house for primary pupils, but ceased taking on boarders in 1940. In 1968, the primary school closed, and the School became purely a secondary school. In 1966, the London Missionary Society was restructured to become the Council for World Mission, and Ying Wa Girls' School became one of the affiliated schools of the Hong Kong Council of the Church of Christ in China.

Ying Wa Girls' School was one of the first girls' schools in Hong Kong that proposed the establishment of a students' union. Students were elected to represent their peers, and worked to promote self-expression.

As a missionary of the London Missionary Society, Vera Silcocks (1902–1977) came by boat from England to Hong Kong in 1927 to teach in the School; she spoke fluent Cantonese. In 1939, she became the Headmistress of the School. In December 1941, Hong Kong fell to Japanese forces in the Battle of Hong Kong. During the subsequent Japanese occupation of Hong Kong, Miss Silcocks was held by the Japanese at the Stanley Internment Camp.

The School reopened after the liberation of Hong Kong in 1945. In 1947, Miss Silcocks returned to the School as Headmistress; the School Council was established the following year. In 1949, the Student Association was established. In 1967, Miss Silcocks retired and returned to England.

=== Redevelopment of campus ===
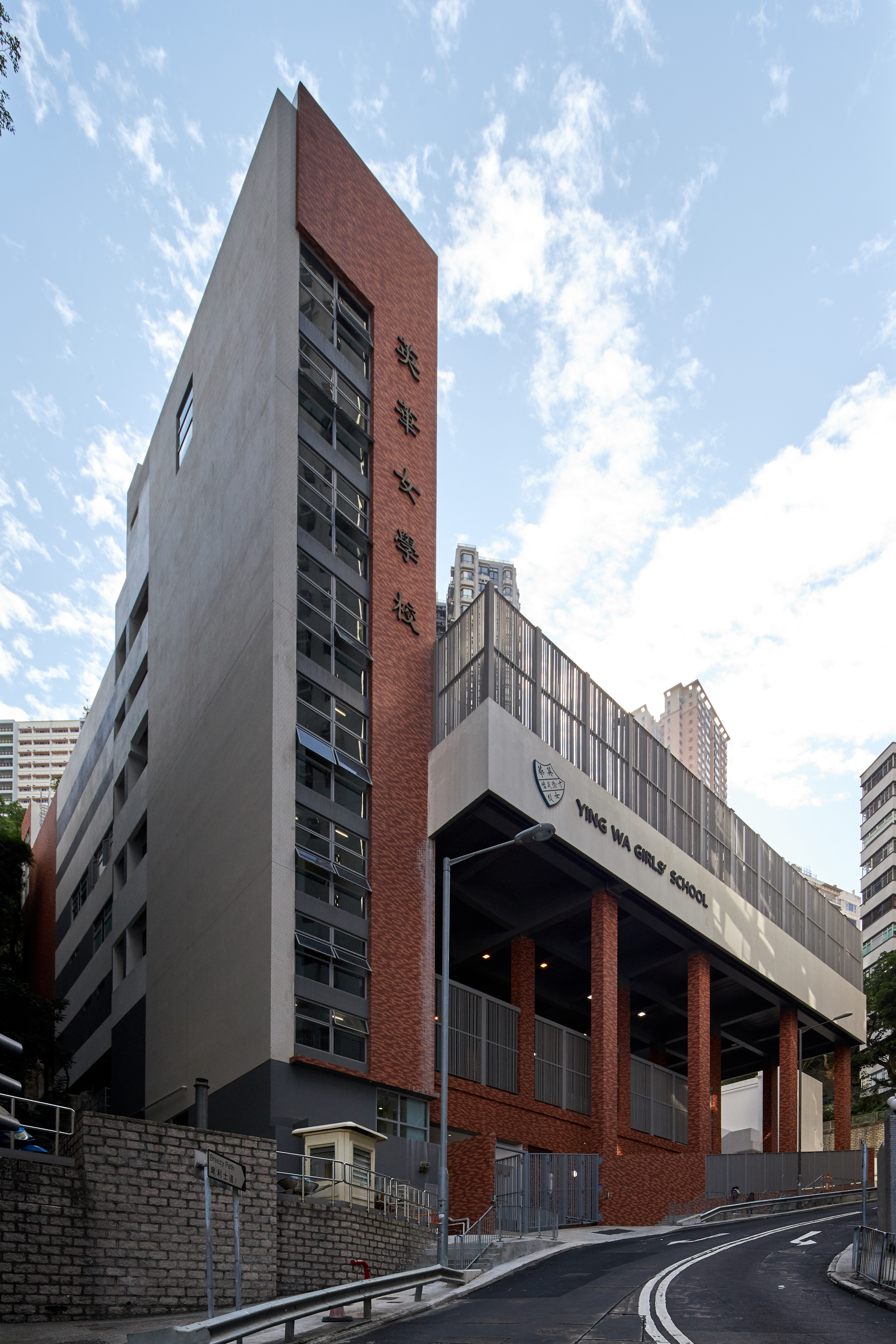
YWGS Breezy Path Campus

In December 2009, Ying Wa Girls' School announced its redevelopment project. Supported by the Education Bureau, a new campus would replace the existing one on the same Robinson Road / Bonham Road site which has housed the school for over a century. Upon completion, available ground area will be expanded by about 50%, thus making it possible to overcome the recurring and constant lack of space since the School's founding.

In November 2011, Ying Wa Girls' School received HK$10 million from the Li Ka Shing Foundation. It was used to establish the Li Chong Yuet Ming Student Development Fund which provides opportunities for disadvantaged students. The fund is named after Madam Amy Li Chong Yuet-ming, wife of Li Ka-shing, who attended the School.

In 2015, construction work commenced for the new school campus in Robinson Road; the school moved to Sham Shui Po during that period.

=== Relationship with Ying Wa College ===
Ying Wa College is a school for boys which was also founded by the London Missionary Society. The Principal of Ying Wa College, Mr. Allan Cheng, is a member of the Incorporated Management Committee of Ying Wa Girls' School, whilst Mr. Francis Kwan is also a member of the Committee of Ying Wa College.

== Uniform ==
The school's uniform is a blue cheongsam, with silver school and house badges right under the hook of the collar.

The uniform directly inherits the heritage of girls' school uniforms in Republican Shanghai in the 1930s: it is hemmed with wide, dark blue lines along the bottom hem, sleeves, and collar. The collar, which is higher than that of other schools, is tailored to allow only minimal slack between the collar and the neck. Students complain about a strangling feeling, especially when they look down to read or write at their desks, yet the school has a strict rule requiring the collar to remain properly hooked and closed at all times — even during the hottest summers. The tight-fitting collar results in poor ventilation, trapping perspiration inside the uniform, which becomes damp in humid weather. New students have to develop resilience to the uniform when they first enter the school. The resilience eventually sublimates into treasuring the rich heritage embodied in their uniform, which becomes an icon of their life at Ying Wa, their Chinese identity, and a source of pride for its graduates.

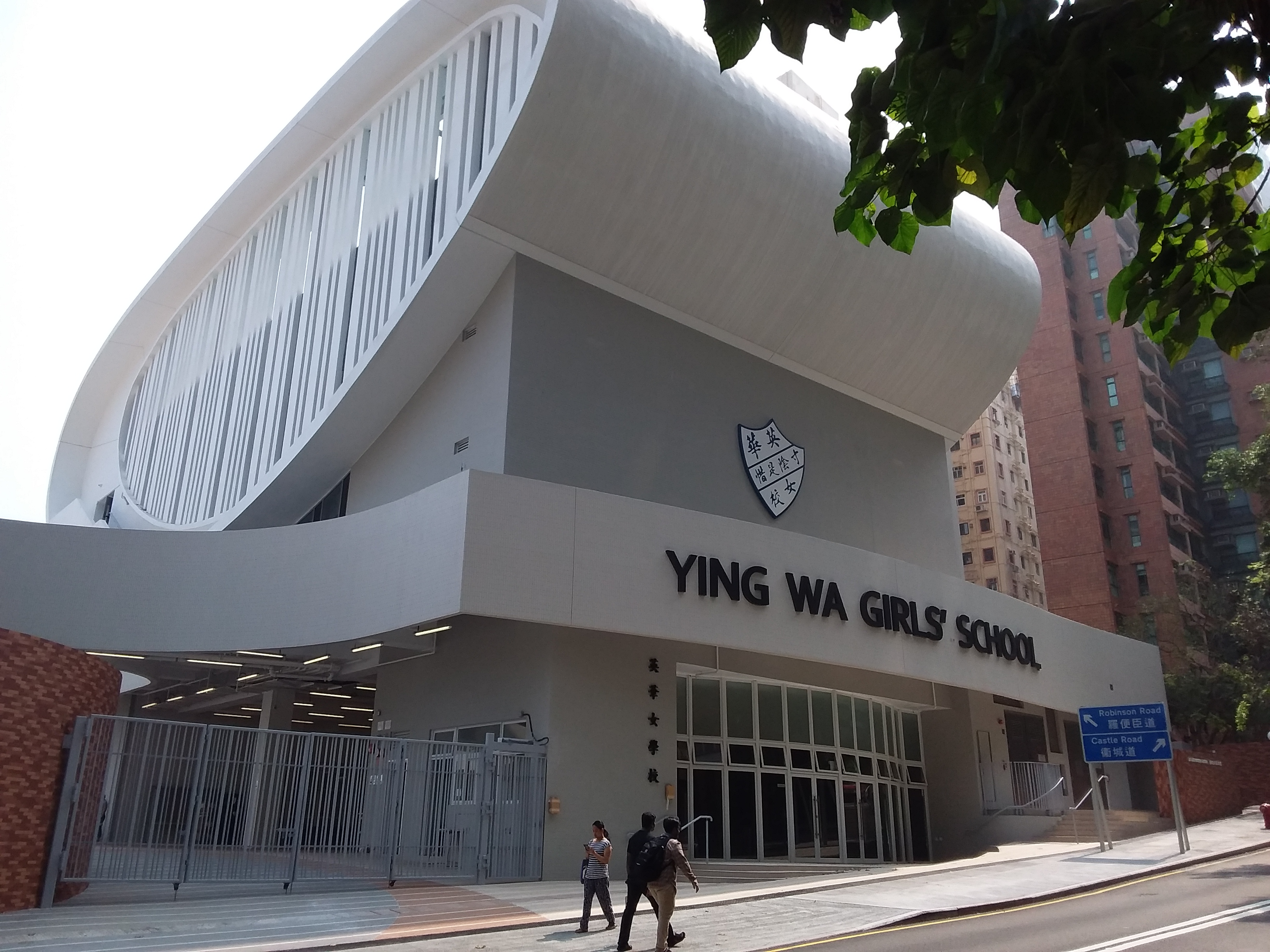
Robinson Road New Campus

== Class structure and curriculum ==
There is a total of 30 classes in the school:

- Form 1: 5 classes (A, B, C, D, E)
- Form 2: 5 classes
- Form 3: 5 classes
- Form 4: 5 classes (NSS Curriculum)
- Form 5: 5 classes (NSS Curriculum)
- Form 6: 5 classes (NSS Curriculum)

Forms 1 to 3 offer a broad general curriculum ,with a good balance among languages, arts, science, cultural and practical subjects, as well as religious and physical education.

In Forms 4 to 6 (NSS curriculum), students can choose 3 electives from a range of 15 subjects, alongside the 4 core subjects of Chinese, English, Mathematics, and Citizenship and Social Development.

Students will take the Hong Kong Diploma of Secondary Education Examination at the end of Form 6 for admission to tertiary institutes through the Joint University Programmes Admission System (JUPAS).

As an E.M.I. (English as the Medium of Instruction) school, Ying Wa adopts English as the teaching language in most subjects, with the aim of achieving bilingualism (Chinese and English) and trilingualism with the inclusion of Putonghua.

All subjects are taught in English, with the exception of Chinese Language, Chinese Language and Culture, Chinese Literature, Chinese History, Religious Education, Physical Education, and Putonghua.

Lessons are arranged on a 5-day week basis. Toastmaster Leadership Training Programmes, Oral English Classes, Public Speaking Classes, and Musical Instrument Classes are offered after school and on Saturdays.

== Student Association ==
Established by former principal, Miss Silcocks, in 1949, the Student Association is one of the oldest student bodies among local schools.

== House system ==
There are five Houses, named after the five early principals of the school:

- Davies (green)
- Hogben (yellow)
- Hutchinson (blue)
- Silcocks (orange)
- Jenkins (red)

Each house is represented by two house captains. The houses compete with each other on sports day and at the swimming gala. The aim of establishing the house system is to strengthen the students' ties to the school by establishing pride in house membership.

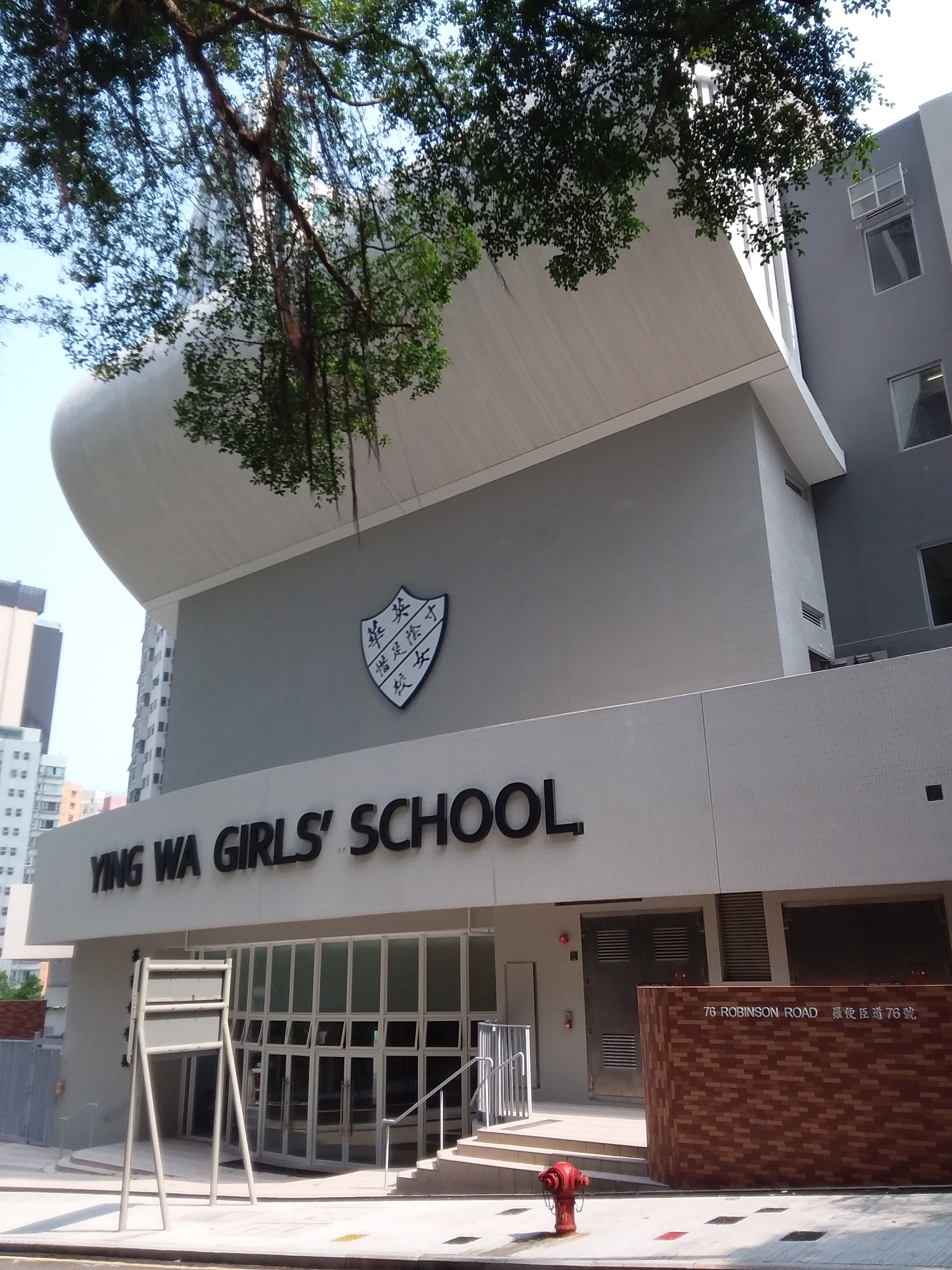
YWGS Robinson Road entrance

== Controversy over documentary ==
In February 2023, the documentary To My Nineteen-year-old Self by Mabel Cheung, which followed the lives of six Ying Wa Girls' School students over a decade, was pulled from cinemas after some of the students said that they had not given consent to screen it publicly. The school maintained that consent forms had been signed by the girls at the beginning of filming, and during the production. Cheung issued an apology, as did Ruth Shek Yuk-yu, the former headteacher of the college who was involved in the film. The documentary won a series of accolades, including the 2022 Hong Kong Film Critics Society Award.

== See also ==
- The Hong Kong Council of the Church of Christ in China
- List of secondary schools in Hong Kong
- London Missionary Society
- Ying Wa College
