= Hong Kong Institute of Technology =

- 香港科技專上書院
- Former names: College of Info-Tech
- Type: Self-financed
- Established: 1997; 29 years ago
- President: Dr Joy SHI Mei-chun
- Academic staff: 50
- Students: 416 (sub-degree)
- Undergraduates: 366
- Location: Hong Kong
- Campus: 213 Nam Cheong Street, Sham Shui Po, Kowloon
- Language: English; Cantonese
- Website: Official website

Chinese name
- Simplified Chinese: 香港科技专上书院
- Traditional Chinese: 香港科技專上書院
Transcriptions
Standard Mandarin
- Hanyu Pinyin: Xiānggǎng Kējì Zhuān Shàng Shūyuàn
Yue: Cantonese
- Yale Romanization: Hēung góng fō geih jyūn seuhng syū yuhn
- Jyutping: Hoeng1 gong2 fo1 gei6 zyun1 soeng6 syu1 jyun6

The Hong Kong Institute of Technology (HKIT) is a private, non-profit higher education institution established in 1997 in Hong Kong.

HKIT offers full-time and part-time overseas degrees primarily in the fields of Arts, Business Administration, and Science and Technology. Many of these courses have been developed by overseas universities and are delivered by HKIT and international staff on-campus in Hong Kong. HKIT courses are fully accredited by the Hong Kong Council for Accreditation of Academic and Vocational Qualifications.
