= Lyttelton Road, Hong Kong =

Street in Hong Kong

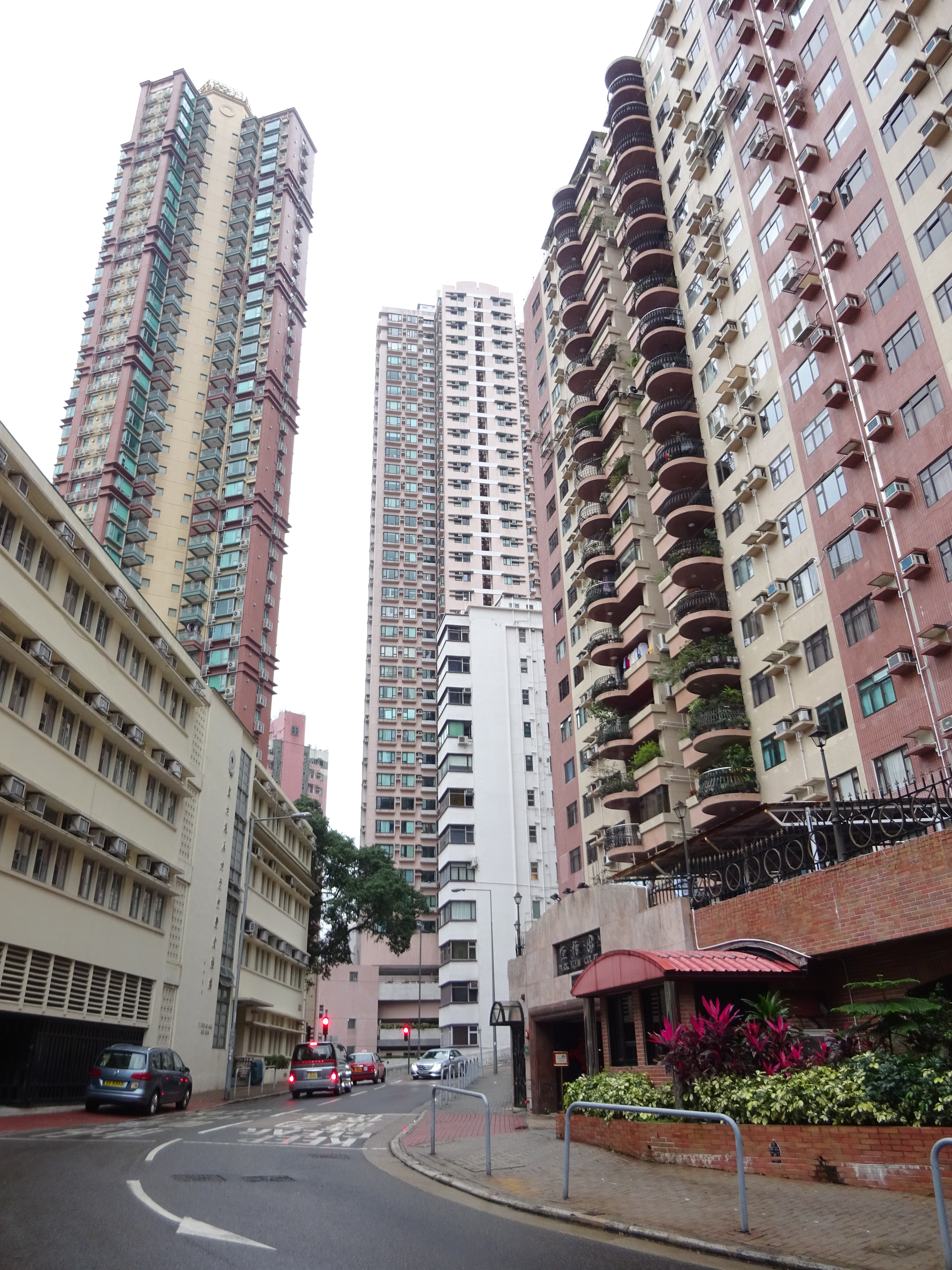
Lyttelton Road, near Park View Court

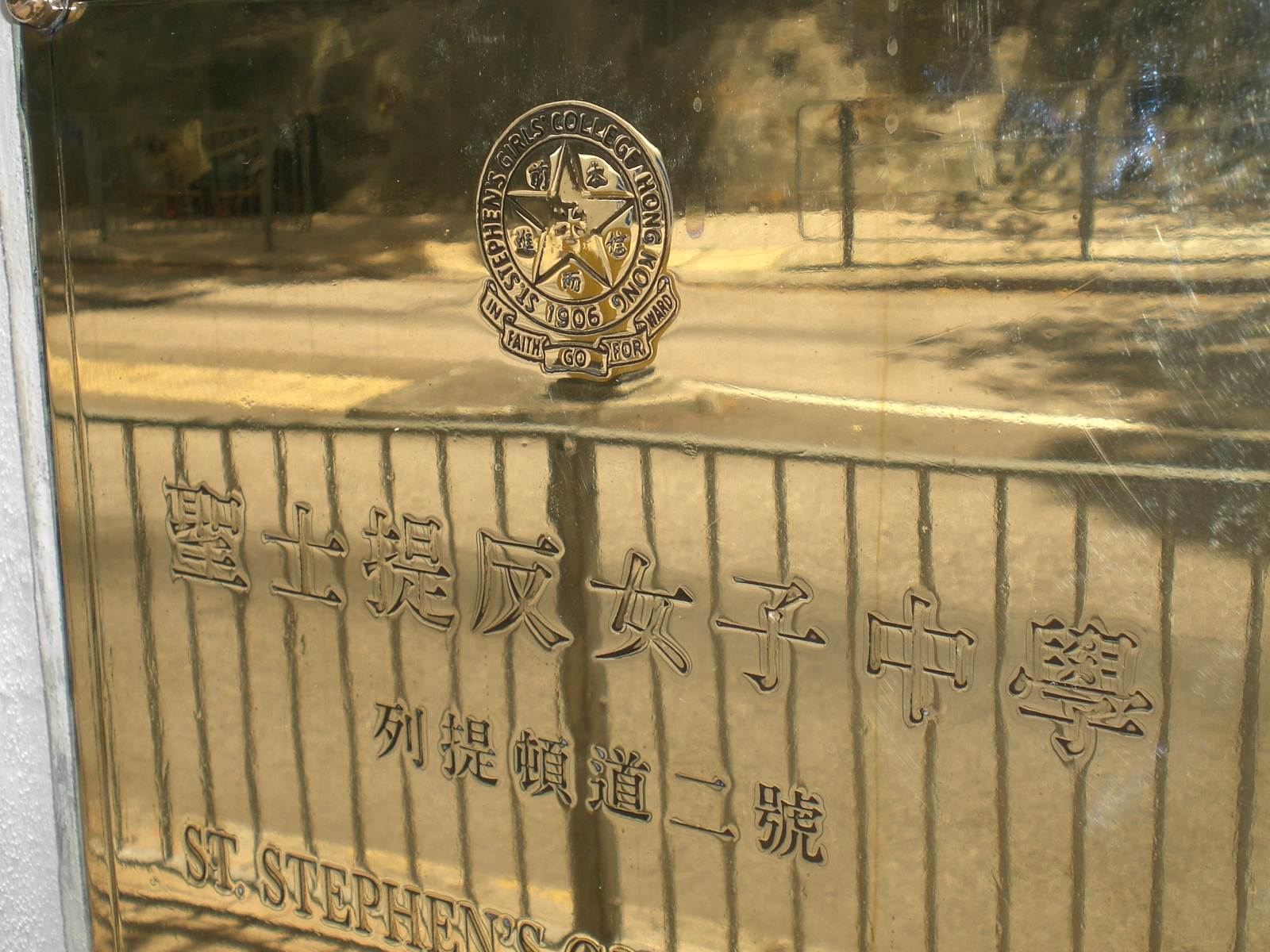
Gate of St. Stephen's Girls' College at 2 Lyttelton Road

Lyttelton Road (Chinese: 列堤頓道) is a street in the Mid-Levels area of Hong Kong Island, Hong Kong. It is located south of Park Road in the Central and Western District, north of Robinson Road and east of Babington Road. Lyttelton Road is an uphill road, starting from Park Road, near St. Stephen's Girls' College, passes through West End Park, and ending at Babington Road, near University of Hong Kong.

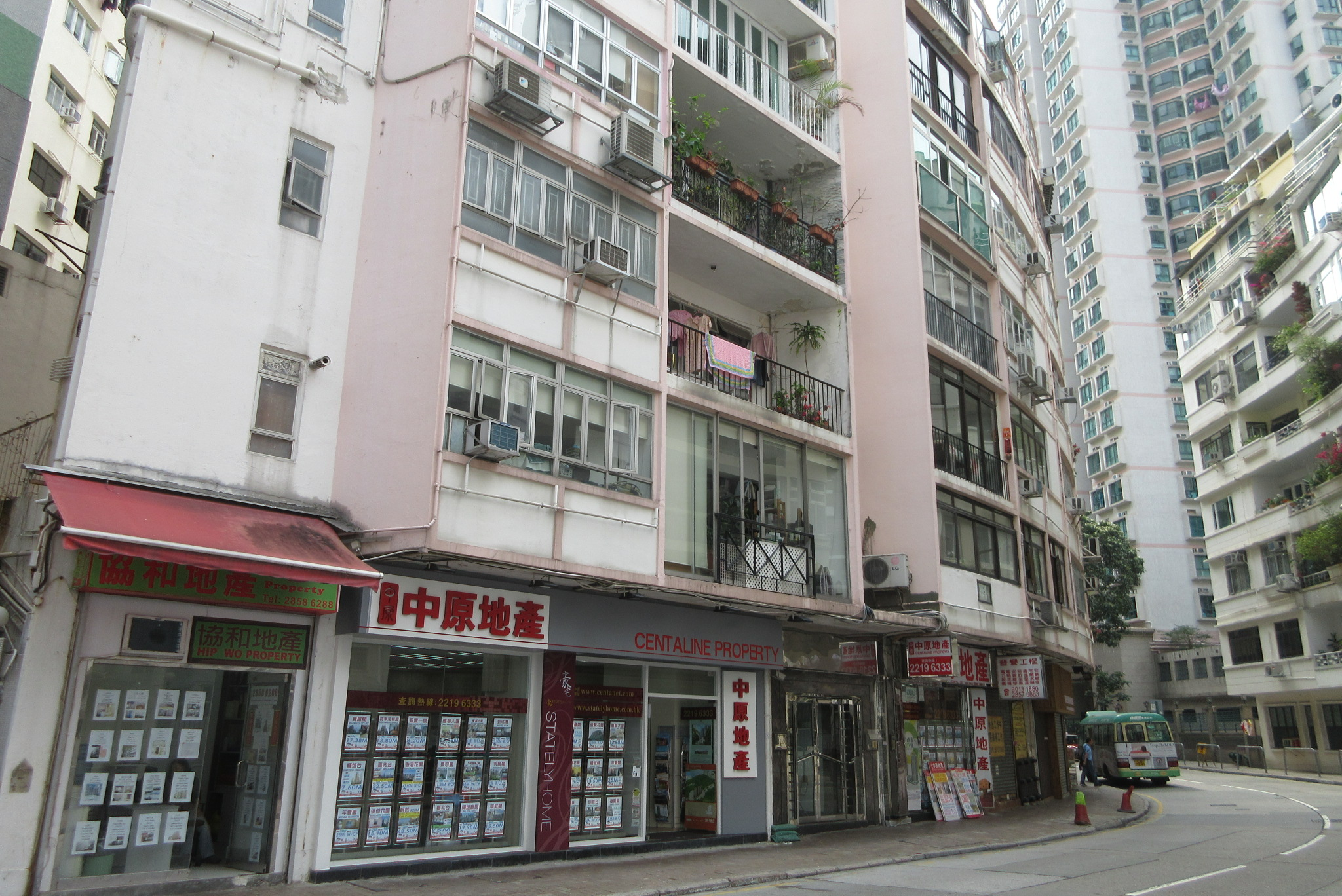
Fook Wah Mansions, Lyttelton Road

== History ==
Lyttelton Road was originally named Lower Richmond Road (下列治文道). On January 26, 1904, the Hong Kong Government merged Upper Richmond Road into Robinson Road and changed Lower Richmond Road to its current name, which was named after the then British Colonial Secretary Alfred Lyttelton.

== In film and television ==
Lyttelton Road has appeared in many Hong Kong films and TV series:

- Love in a Puff (志明與春嬌): Cherie's ex-boyfriend Ka Ho (家豪) lived in Lyttelton Road
- Come Home Love: Lo And Behold (愛·回家之開心速遞): 99 Lyttelton Road was one of the main story venues. In reality, the highest street number on Lyttelton Road is only 77.
- Light of Million Hopes (萬家燈火): Tang Shui Hei and his family lived on Lyttelton Road
